= Kip =

Kip, KIP or kips may refer to:

== Athletics ==
- Kip (artistic gymnastics), a basic skill on the women's uneven bars
- Kip (trampolining), a coaching skill used in trampolining
- Kip-up, an acrobatic manoeuvre used in martial arts and gymnastics

== People ==
- Kip (given name), including a list of people and fictional characters with the name
- Kip (nickname), including a list of people with the nickname
- Kip (surname), including a list of people with the name
- Billy Gunn (born 1963), ring name Kip, American wrestler

== Places ==
- Kip, Croatia
- Kip, Southern Highlands Province, Papua New Guinea
- Kip Peak, Queen Alexandra Range, Antarctica
- Kip Water, Inverclyde, Scotland

== Other uses ==
- Wikipede, a Wikipedia mascot
- Kip (unit), a U.S. customary unit of force
- Kham language, ISO 639 code kip
- CIP/KIP, a family of mammalian cyclin dependent kinase inhibitors
- Lao kip, the currency of Laos
- Katathym-imaginative psychotherapy, or guided imagery, a mind-body intervention
- Kinetic impact projectile, or baton round
- Kirchhoff Institute of Physics, at the Heidelberg University Faculty of Physics and Astronomy, Germany
- Know India Programme, an Indian government initiative
- KIP, Kruzenshtern & Parohod, Israeli Klezmer rock music band
- Independent Elections Commission (Komisi Independen Pemilihan), a local election body in Aceh, Indonesia

== See also ==
- KP (disambiguation)
- Kipp (disambiguation)
- Kipps (disambiguation)
