= Kipp =

Kipp may refer to:

== People ==
=== Given name ===
- Kipp Hamilton (1934–1981), American actress
- Kipp Keller (born 2000), American association football player
- Kipp Lennon (born 1960), American musician
- Kipp Marcus (born 1970), American actor, producer, screenwriter, and digital media executive
- Kipp Vickers (born 1969), American football player

=== Surname ===
- Albert Hamilton Kipp (1850–1906), American architect
- Annika Kipp (born 1979), German radio and television presenter
- Bernd Kipp (born 1948), German association football striker
- Cathy Kipp, American politician
- Darrell Kipp (1944–2013), Native American educator, documentary filmmaker, and historian
- Eugen Kipp (1885–1931), German association football player
- Fred Kipp (born 1931), American baseball player
- Friedrich Kipp (1814–1869), German physician and entomologist
- George Kipp, several people
- Jeremy Kipp Walker, American film director and producer
- Karl Kipp (1865–1925), Russian pianist and teacher
- Karl-Heinz Kipp (1924–2017), German entrepreneur
- Lara Kipp (born 2002), Austrian luger
- Lyman Kipp (1929–2014), American sculptor and painter
- Maria Kipp (1900–1988), German textile designer and engineer
- Petrus Jacobus Kipp (1808–1864), Dutch chemist
- Phyllis Kipp (died 1984), American politician
- Robert Kipp (1919–1949), Canadian flying ace
- Shalaya Kipp (born 1990), American Olympic middle-distance runner
- Theodor Kipp (1862–1931), German jurist
- Tom Kipp (born 1968), American motorcycle racer
- Ursula Bechtolsheimer-Kipp (born 1951), German businesswoman

== Places ==
- Kipp, Kansas, an unincorporated community in Kansas, United States
- Kipp, Alberta, a locality in Alberta, Canada
- Kipp Coulee, a water feature in Southern Alberta, Canada
- Kipp Hill, a mountain in New York, United States
- Mount Kipp, a mountain in Lewis Range, Montana, United States

== Other uses ==
- KIPP (Knowledge Is Power Program), a US network of college-preparatory schools
- KIPP, a fictional character in Christopher Nolan's film Interstellar

== See also ==
- Kip (disambiguation)
- Kipps (disambiguation)
- Kipp's apparatus or Kipp generator, a piece of laboratory glassware used for generating gases from a chemical reaction
