= Gravel Run (Susquehanna River tributary) =

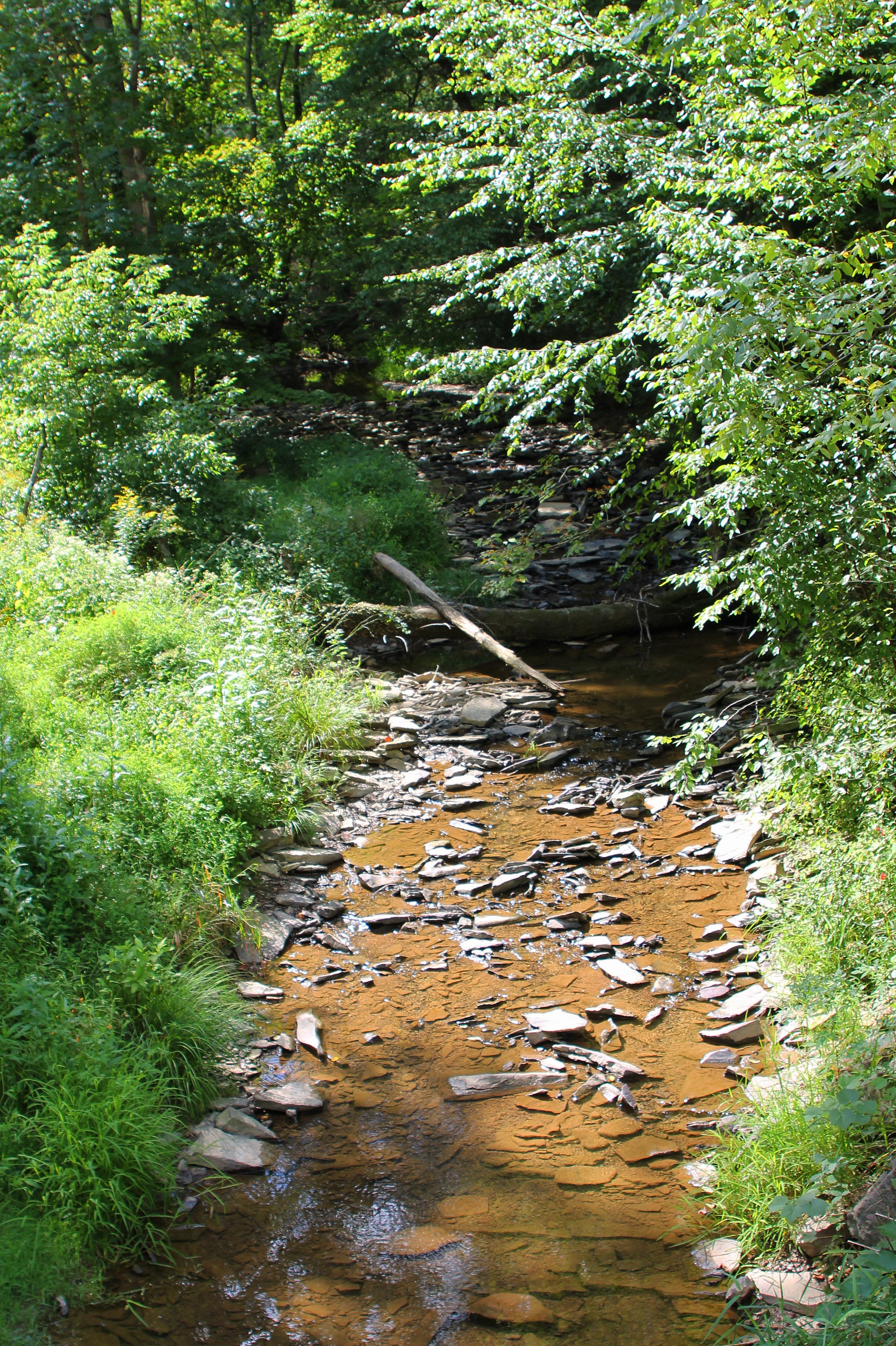
- Gravel Run

Physical characteristics
- Source
  - location: hill in southern Rush Township, Northumberland County, Pennsylvania
  - elevation: between 820 and 840 feet (250 and 260 m)
- Mouth
  - location: Susquehanna River in Rush Township, Northumberland County, Pennsylvania
  - coordinates: 40°55′18″N 76°42′59″W
  - elevation: 436 ft (133 m)
- Length: 4.4 mi (7.1 km)
- Basin size: 6.33 mi^{2} (16.4 km^{2})

Basin features
- Progression: Susquehanna River → Chesapeake Bay

Gravel Run is a tributary of the Susquehanna River in Northumberland County, Pennsylvania, in the United States. It is approximately 4.4 miles (7.1 km) long and flows through Rush Township and Upper Augusta Township. The watershed of the stream has an area of 6.33 square miles (16.4 km^{2}). A number of bridges cross the stream and a mill was also historically present along it. The stream is considered to be a Coldwater Fishery and a Migratory Fishery. It has a number of unnamed tributaries.

== Course ==
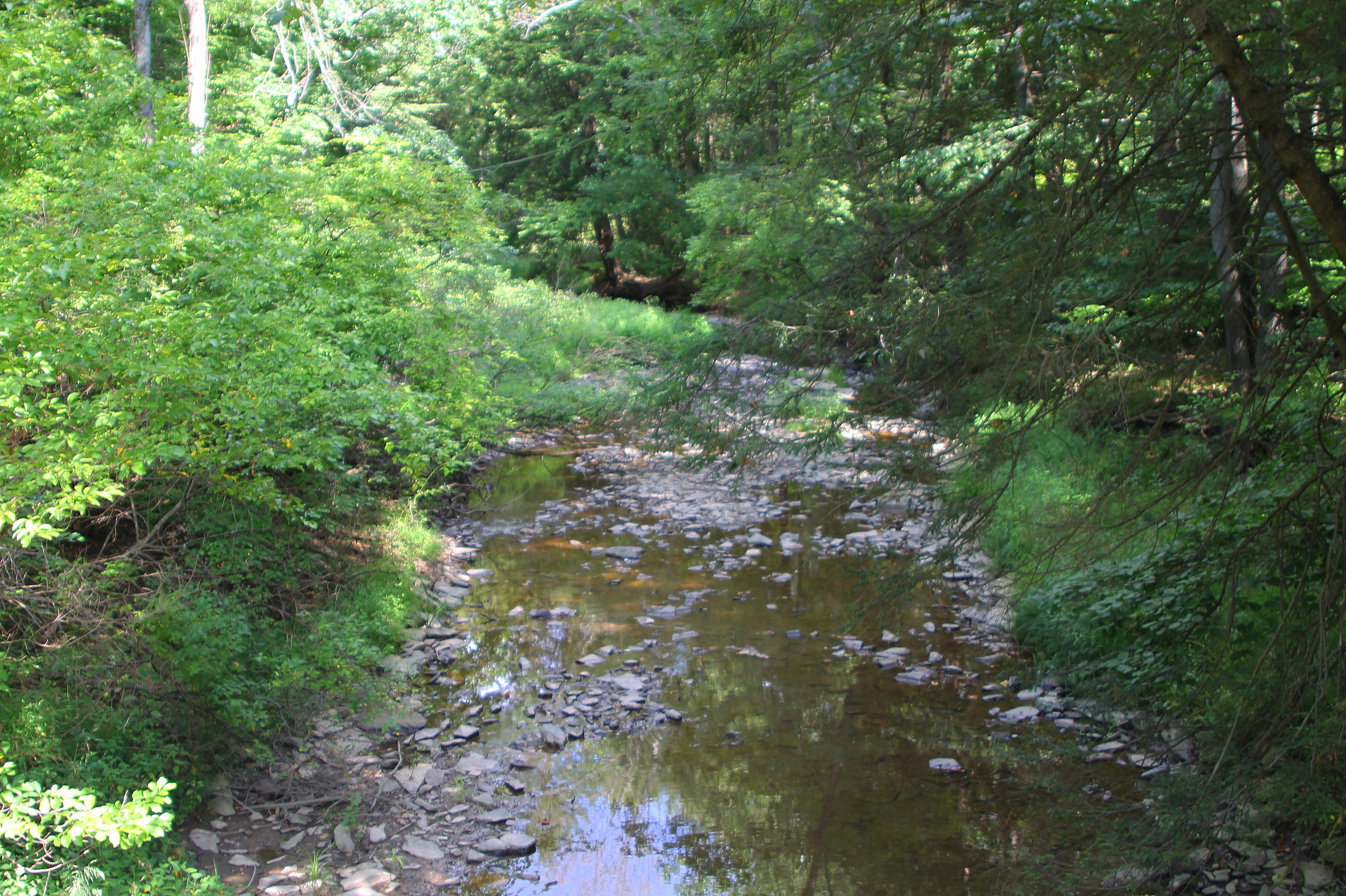
Gravel Run

Gravel Run begins on a hill in southern Rush Township. It flows west for a few hundred feet and then turns southwest for a similar distance before turning west again. The stream then turns roughly to the north for more than a mile, flowing parallel to Pine Swamp Road for most of the distance and receiving an unnamed tributary. Its valley deepens in this area. The stream then reaches Klines Grove, where it receives another unnamed tributary and turns northeast, flowing along the border between Rush Township and Upper Augusta Township. After a few hundred feet, it makes an abrupt turn west before turning north-northwest. The stream's valley continues to deepen and after approximately a mile, the stream turns west and slightly south before gradually turning northwest and reaching Wolverton. In Wolverton, the stream reaches its confluence with the Susquehanna River.

Gravel Run joins the Susquehanna River 130.58 miles (210.15 km) upriver of its mouth.

== Geography ==
Gravel Run enters the Susquehanna River on the river's left bank. The elevation near the mouth of Gravel Run is 436 feet (133 m) above sea level. The elevation of the stream's source is between 820 and 840 feet (250 and 260 m).

Gravel Run forms a portion of the border between Rush Township and Upper Augusta Township.

== Watershed ==
The watershed of Gravel Run has an area of 6.33 square miles (16.4 km^{2}). Both the mouth and the headwaters of the stream are in the United States Geological Survey quadrangle of Riverside. The stream is one of the main streams in Northumberland County.

== History ==
Gravel Run has been contained in Northumberland County since the county was formed in 1772, when Pennsylvania was still a colony. At the time, it was located in Augusta Township, but in 1785, Catawissa Township split off from Augusta, with Gravel Run part of the border between the two. Three years later, in 1788, Ralpho Township split from Catawissa, and included the land that bordered Augusta; Ralpho was renamed Shamokin a year later. In 1819, Rush Township was created by splitting Shamokin, with Rush on the Augusta border. A year later, the triennial assessment listed Henry Lacock as the owner of a gristmill and a sawmill on Gravel Run in Rush Township. The 1846 split of Augusta Township into Upper Augusta Township and Lower Augusta Township left Gravel Run as part of the border between Rush Township and Upper Augusta Township.

Gravel Run was entered into the Geographic Names Information System on August 2, 1979. Its identifier in the Geographic Names Information System is 1176010.

Two bridges that are more than 20 feet (6.1 m) long have been built over Gravel Run. A concrete channel beam bridge was built over the stream in 1939 and repaired in 2003. It is 28.9 feet (8.8 m) long. A concrete tee beam bridge that is 26.9 feet (8.2 m) long was built over the stream in 1960.

Bassett Campground is located near Gravel Run, in the stream's left floodway.

== Biology ==
As of August 31, 2011, the wild trout designation for Gravel Run is being considered. It has been proposed that the stream be designated as a stream with naturally reproducing trout. The stream's Chapter 93 Classification is considered to be a Coldwater Fishery and a Migratory Fishery throughout its drainage basin.

== See also ==
- Packers Run, next tributary of the Susquehanna River going upriver
- Lithia Springs Creek, next tributary of the Susquehanna River going upriver
- List of rivers of Pennsylvania
