= Wilson Run =

Wilson Run may refer to:

- Wilson Run (Brandywine Creek tributary), a stream in Delaware
- Wilson Run (Missouri), a stream in Missouri
- Wilson Run (Little Muskingum River tributary), a stream in Ohio
- Wilson Run (Kipps Run tributary), a stream in Pennsylvania
- Wilson Run (Sewickley Creek tributary), a stream in Westmoreland County, Pennsylvania

Other:

- Wilson Run: a cross country race run at Sedbergh School
