= Kip (nickname) =

As a nickname, Kip may refer to:

== In arts and entertainment ==
- Kip Anderson (1938–2007), American soul blues and R&B singer and songwriter
- Kip Fulbeck (born 1965), American artist, filmmaker and author
- Austin H. Kiplinger (1918–2015), American publisher and journalist
- Kip Pardue (born 1975), American actor
- Tod Williams (filmmaker) (born 1968), American director, producer and screenwriter

== In sports ==
- Kipkoech Cheruiyot (born 1964), retired middle-distance runner from Kenya
- Kipchoge Keino (born 1940), Kenyan retired middle- and long-distance runner
- Jason Kipnis (born 1987), American Major League Baseball player
- Bernard Lagat (born 1974), Kenyan-American middle- and long-distance athlete
- Kristopher McDaniel (born 1982), Canadian retired rower
- Kip Selbach (1872–1956), American Major League Baseball player
- Kip Taylor (1909–2002), American football player and college head coach
- Kip Wells (born 1977), American Major League Baseball pitcher
- Khairul Idham Pawi (born 1998), Malaysian motorcycle racer

== In other fields ==
- Kip Holden (1952–2025), American politician
- Kip Rhinelander (1903–1936), New York socialite whose marriage to a biracial woman caused a sensation
- Kip Thorne (born 1940), American theoretical physicist
- Kip Tiernan (1926–2011), American social activist
- William E. Ward (born 1949), retired US Army lieutenant general

== See also ==
- Kip (disambiguation)
- Kip (given name)
- Kip (surname)
