= Handspring =

Handspring may refer to:

- Handspring (company), a company that made personal digital assistants
- Handspring (gymnastics), a gymnastics move involving forward or backward rotation of the body
- Rising handspring or nip-up, an acrobatic transition from supine to squatting position
