= Kipps (disambiguation) =

Kipps: The Story of a Simple Soul is a 1905 novel by H. G. Wells.

Kipps may also refer to:

- Kipps (1921 film), a 1921 British drama film adaptation of the novel
- Kipps (1941 film), a 1941 comedy film adaptation of the novel
- Arthur Kipps (disambiguation)
- George Kipps, English cricketer
- Kipp's apparatus, an apparatus for preparation of small volumes of gases
- Kipps Run, a tributary of the Susquehanna River in Northumberland County, Pennsylvania
- Kipps family in the 2005 novel On Beauty by British author Zadie Smith

== See also ==
- Kipp (disambiguation)
