= List of Superbike World Championship race winners =

This is a list of winners of one or more Superbike World Championship races, since the championship was established in 1988.

== By rider ==
| Rank | Name | Seasons | Race Wins | World Titles |
|---|---|---|---|---|
| 1 | (United Kingdom) Jonathan Rea | 2008–2026 | 119 | 6 |
| 2 | (Turkey) Toprak Razgatlıoğlu | 2018–2025 | 78 | 3 |
| 3 | (Spain) Álvaro Bautista | 2019–2026 | 63 | 2 |
| 4 | (United Kingdom) Carl Fogarty | 1988–2000 | 59 | 4 |
| 5 | (Australia) Troy Bayliss | 1997–1998, 2000–2002, 2006–2008, 2015 | 52 | 3 |
| 5 | (Italy) Nicolò Bulega | 2024–2026 | 52 | 1 |
| 7 | (Japan) Noriyuki Haga | 1994–2000, 2002, 2004–2011, 2013 | 43 | |
| 8 | (United Kingdom) Tom Sykes | 2008–2021 | 34 | 1 |
| 9 | (Australia) Troy Corser | 1992, 1994–1996, 1998–2001, 2003–2011 | 33 | 2 |
| 10 | (United Kingdom) Chaz Davies | 2012–2021 | 32 | |
| 11 | (United States) Colin Edwards | 1995–2002 | 31 | 2 |
| 12 | (United States) Doug Polen | 1989, 1991–1992, 1994 | 27 | 2 |
| 13 | (Spain) Carlos Checa | 2008–2013 | 24 | 1 |
| 14 | (France) Raymond Roche | 1988–1992 | 23 | 1 |
| 15 | (Italy) Marco Melandri | 2011–2014, 2017–2020 | 22 | |
| 16 | (Italy) Max Biaggi | 2007–2012, 2015 | 21 | 2 |
| 17 | (Italy) Pierfrancesco Chili | 1995–2006 | 17 | |
| 18 | (Italy) Giancarlo Falappa | 1989–1994 | 16 | |
| 18 | (United Kingdom) Neil Hodgson | 1996–1998, 2000–2003 | 16 | 1 |
| 18 | (United Kingdom) James Toseland | 2001–2007, 2010–2011 | 16 | 2 |
| 21 | (United States) John Kocinski | 1996–1997 | 14 | 1 |
| 21 | (United States) Scott Russell | 1990–1995, 1997–1998 | 14 | 1 |
| 21 | (United States) Ben Spies | 2009 | 14 | 1 |
| 24 | (Republic of Ireland) Eugene Laverty | 2011–2014, 2017–2022 | 13 | |
| 24 | (New Zealand) Aaron Slight | 1989–2000 | 13 | |
| 26 | (United Kingdom) Scott Redding | 2020–2025 | 12 | |
| 27 | (France) Régis Laconi | 2001, 2003–2009 | 11 | |
| 27 | (Spain) Ruben Xaus | 1998, 2001–2003, 2006–2011 | 11 | |
| 27 | (Belgium) Stéphane Mertens | 1988–1994 | 11 | |
| 30 | (Italy) Fabrizio Pirovano | 1988–1995 | 10 | |
| 30 | (Australia) Chris Vermeulen | 2004–2005, 2010–2011 | 10 | |
| 32 | (France) Sylvain Guintoli | 2009–2017 | 9 | 1 |
| 33 | (Australia) Anthony Gobert | 1994–1996, 1999–2000 | 8 | |
| 33 | (United States) Fred Merkel | 1988–1993 | 8 | 2 |
| 35 | (United States) Ben Bostrom | 1998–2002, 2005 | 7 | |
| 36 | (Netherlands) Michael van der Mark | 2015–2025 | 6 | |
| 37 | (United Kingdom) Leon Haslam | 2003–2004, 2008–2022 | 5 | |
| 37 | (Italy) Davide Tardozzi | 1988–1992 | 5 | |
| 37 | (Italy) Michael Ruben Rinaldi | 2018–2024 | 5 | |
| 40 | (Italy) Michel Fabrizio | 2006–2015 | 4 | |
| 40 | (Japan) Yukio Kagayama | 2001, 2003, 2005–2009 | 4 | |
| 40 | (Australia) Rob Phillis | 1988–1994, 1996 | 4 | |
| 40 | (United Kingdom) Alex Lowes | 2011, 2014–2025 | 4 | |
| 40 | (Spain) Iker Lecuona | 2022–2026 | 4 | |
| 44 | (United Kingdom) Cal Crutchlow | 2010 | 3 | |
| 44 | (Australia) Michael Doohan | 1988 | 3 | |
| 44 | (Japan) Ryuichi Kiyonari | 2008–2010 | 3 | |
| 44 | (Italy) Lorenzo Lanzi | 2005–2010, 2012 | 3 | |
| 44 | (Japan) Makoto Tamada | 2000–2002, 2008–2009 | 3 | |
| 44 | (Japan) Akira Yanagawa | 1997–2002, 2010 | 3 | |
| 44 | (Italy) Danilo Petrucci | 2024–2025 | 3 | |
| 51 | (France) Loris Baz | 2012–2014, 2018–2022 | 2 | |
| 51 | (United Kingdom) Shane "Shakey" Byrne | 2002–2003, 2009–2010 | 2 | |
| 51 | (United States) Doug Chandler | 1990, 1996–1998, 2001–2002 | 2 | |
| 51 | (Australia) Michael Dowson | 1988–1990 | 2 | |
| 51 | (Australia) Peter Goddard | 1989–1990, 1995–1996, 1998–2002 | 2 | |
| 51 | (Japan) Hitoyasu Izutsu | 1999–2003 | 2 | |
| 51 | (Italy) Mauro Lucchiari | 1992–1995, 1999, 2005 | 2 | |
| 51 | (Italy) Marco Lucchinelli | 1988 | 2 | |
| 51 | (Australia) Kevin Magee | 1991–1992 | 2 | |
| 51 | (Germany) Max Neukirchner | 2005–2010, 2013 | 2 | |
| 51 | (United Kingdom) Terry Rymer | 1988–1994, 1998 | 2 | |
| 62 | (Japan) Takuma Aoki | 1994–1996 | 1 | |
| 62 | (Brazil) Alex Barros | 2006 | 1 | |
| 62 | (Canada) Gary Goodfellow | 1988–1989 | 1 | |
| 62 | (United States) Nicky Hayden | 2002, 2016–2017 | 1 | |
| 62 | (United States) Tom Kipp | 1991, 1995, 1997 | 1 | |
| 62 | (Japan) Keiichi Kitagawa | 1992–2000 | 1 | |
| 62 | (Australia) Garry McCoy | 2004–2005 | 1 | |
| 62 | (Austria) Andy Meklau | 1992–2000, 2004 | 1 | |
| 62 | (France) Adrien Morillas | 1988, 1992–1995 | 1 | |
| 62 | (Spain) Fonsi Nieto | 2005–2009 | 1 | |
| 62 | (Canada) Pascal Picotte | 1991, 1995, 1997 | 1 | |
| 62 | (Australia) Andrew Pitt | 2005–2006, 2010 | 1 | |
| 62 | (United Kingdom) John Reynolds | 1992, 1995–2001, 2003 | 1 | |
| 62 | (Japan) Akira Ryo | 1996–2001 | 1 | |
| 62 | (Japan) Yuichi Takeda | 1996–2000, 2002 | 1 | |
| 62 | (Spain) Jordi Torres | 2015–2019 | 1 | |
| 62 | (France) Alex Vieira | 1988–1990, 1993–1994 | 1 | |
| 62 | (United Kingdom) Chris Walker | 1997–2000, 2002–2006 | 1 | |
| 62 | (United Kingdom) James Whitham | 1993–1998 | 1 | |
| 62 | (Italy) Nicholas Spinelli | 2024 | 1 | |
| 62 | (Italy) Andrea Iannone | 2024–2025 | 1 | |
| 62 | (Italy) Andrea Locatelli | 2021–2025 | 1 | |

As of 11 October 2026

== By nationality ==
| Rank | Country | Race Wins | Winning riders |
|---|---|---|---|
| 1 | United Kingdom | 307 | 15 |
| 2 | Italy | 162 | 15 |
| 3 | United States | 119 | 10 |
| 4 | Australia | 118 | 11 |
| 5 | Spain | 104 | 6 |
| 6 | Turkey | 78 | 1 |
| 7 | Japan | 62 | 10 |
| 8 | France | 47 | 6 |
| 9 | Ireland | 13 | 1 |
| | New Zealand | 13 | 1 |
| 11 | Belgium | 11 | 1 |
| 12 | Netherlands | 6 | 1 |
| 13 | Canada | 2 | 2 |
| | Germany | 2 | 1 |
| 15 | Austria | 1 | 1 |
| | Brazil | 1 | 1 |

As of 11 October 2026

== By manufacturer ==
| Rank | Name | Seasons | Race Wins | Titles | First win | Last win |
|---|---|---|---|---|---|---|
| 1 | (Italy) Ducati | 1988–2026 | 482 | 22 | 1988 Donington Park - Race 2 | 2026 Circuito do Estoril - Race 2 |
| 2 | (Japan) Kawasaki | 1988–2026 | 179 | 6 | 1988 Hungaroring - Race 2 | 2024 Phillip Island Grand Prix Circuit - Race 2 |
| 3 | (Japan) Honda | 1988–2026 | 119 | 4 | 1988 Hungaroring - Race 1 | 2016 Sepang International Circuit - Race 2 |
| 4 | (Japan) Yamaha | 1988–2011, 2016–2026 | 117 | 2 | 1988 Sugo - Race 2 | 2025 TT Circuit Assen - Race 2 |
| 5 | (Germany) BMW | 2009–2026 | 53 | 0 | 2012 Donington - Race 1 | 2025 Circuito Estoril - Superpole Race |
| 6 | (Italy) Aprilia | 1999–2003, 2009–2018, 2020 | 52 | 4 | 2000 Phillip Island - Race 2 | 2015 Losail International Circuit - Race 2 |
| 7 | (Japan) Suzuki | 1988–2015 | 32 | 1 | 1988 Sugo - Race 1 | 2014 Phillip Island - Race 1 |
| 8 | (Italy) Bimota | 1988–1991, 2000, 2025-2026 | 11 | 0 | 1988 Donington Park - Race 1 | 2000 Phillip Island - Race 1 |
| | (Italy) Benelli | 2001–2002 | 0 | 0 | | |
| | (Italy) MV Agusta | 2004–2005, 2007, 2014–2018 | 0 | 0 | | |
| | (Malaysia) Petronas | 2003–2006 | 0 | 0 | | |
| | (United States) EBR | 2014–2015 | 0 | 0 | | |

As of 11 October 2026
