= Kipps Run =

Kipps Run Kipp's Run
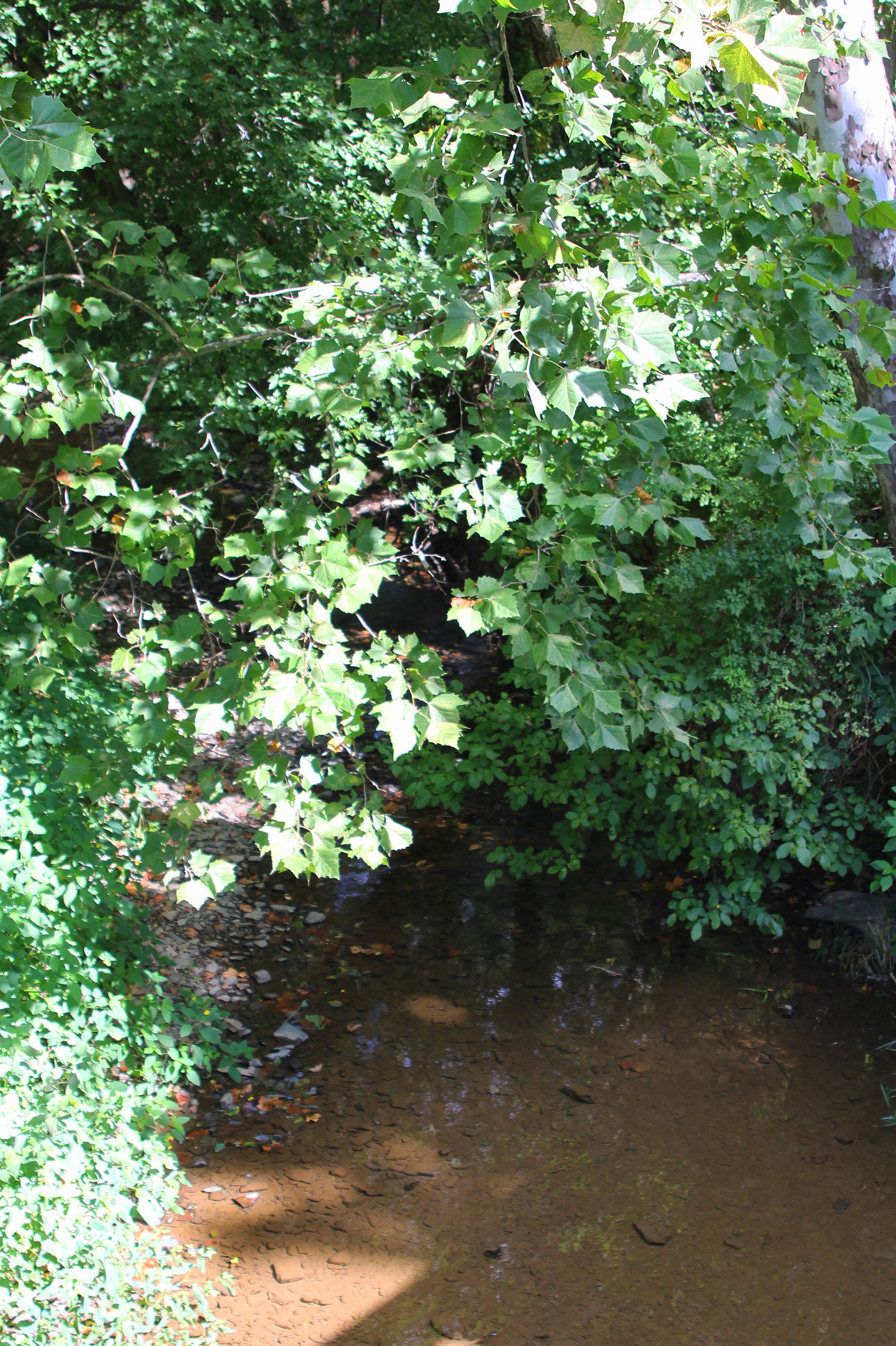
- Kipps Run looking downstream

Physical characteristics
- Source
  - location: Rush Township, Northumberland County, Pennsylvania near Blue Hill
- Mouth
  - location: Susquehanna River at Riverside, Pennsylvania
  - coordinates: 40°57′00″N 76°39′46″W
  - elevation: 443 ft (135 m)
- Length: 3.3 mi (5.3 km)
- Basin size: 6.38 mi^{2} (16.5 km^{2})

Basin features
- Tributaries
  - left: Wilson Run

Kipps Run (also known as Kipp's Run) is a tributary of the Susquehanna River in Northumberland County, Pennsylvania, in the United States. It is approximately 3.3 miles (5.3 km) long and flows through Rush Township and the borough of Riverside. Wilson Run is a tributary of the stream. Kipps Run has an annual sediment load of 4,985,600 pounds (2,261,400 kg), most of which comes from cropland. The stream's watershed has an area of 6.38 square miles, nearly all of which is agricultural or forested land. The stream has a riparian buffer.

== Course ==
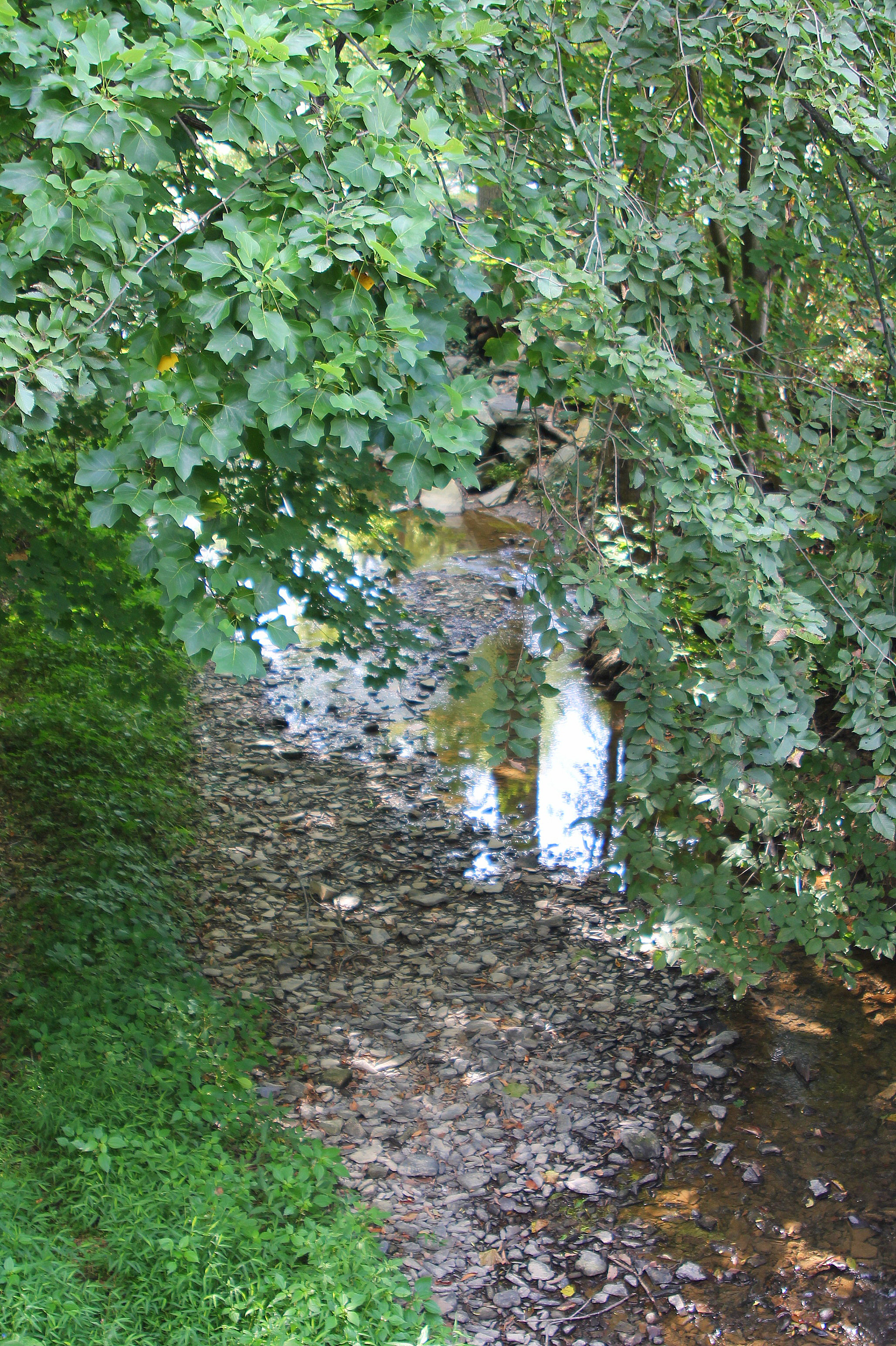
Kipps Run looking upstream

Kipps Run begins in northern Rush Township. The stream's headwaters are on Blue Hill. The stream begins flowing southwest and then northwest in a valley, but after a short distance curves north, following the road. It then exits Rush Township and enters the community of Riverside, where it turns west-northwest, away from the road. The stream also leaves its valley at this point. It receives the tributary Wilson Run from the left and then passes through a series of small ponds. Further downstream, it turns northwest, crossing another road and then crossing the Delaware and Hudson Railroad. Immediately afterwards, the stream enters the Susquehanna River.

Kipps Run joins the Susquehanna River 134.14 miles (215.88 km) upstream of its mouth.

=== Tributaries ===
The only named tributary of Kipps Run is Wilson Run. Wilson Run is on the western side of the main stem. It joins Kipps Run 1.54 miles (2.48 km) upstream of its mouth and its watershed has an area of 3.27 square miles.

== Hydrology ==
The annual load of sediment in Kipps Run is 4,985,600 pounds (2,261,400 kg). The largest contributor is cropland, which contributes 4,565,200 pounds (2,070,700 kg) to the stream. Stream banks contribute 195,600 pounds (88,700 kg) of sediment per year and 143,600 pounds (65,100 kg) of it comes from hay and pastures. Forested land contributes 47,400 pounds (21,500 kg) per year, 18,400 pounds (8,300 kg) comes from land designated by the Pennsylvania Department of Environmental Protection as "low-intensity development", and 15,400 pounds (7,000 kg) comes from land designated by the Pennsylvania Department of Environmental Protection as "transitional".

== Geography, geology, and climate ==
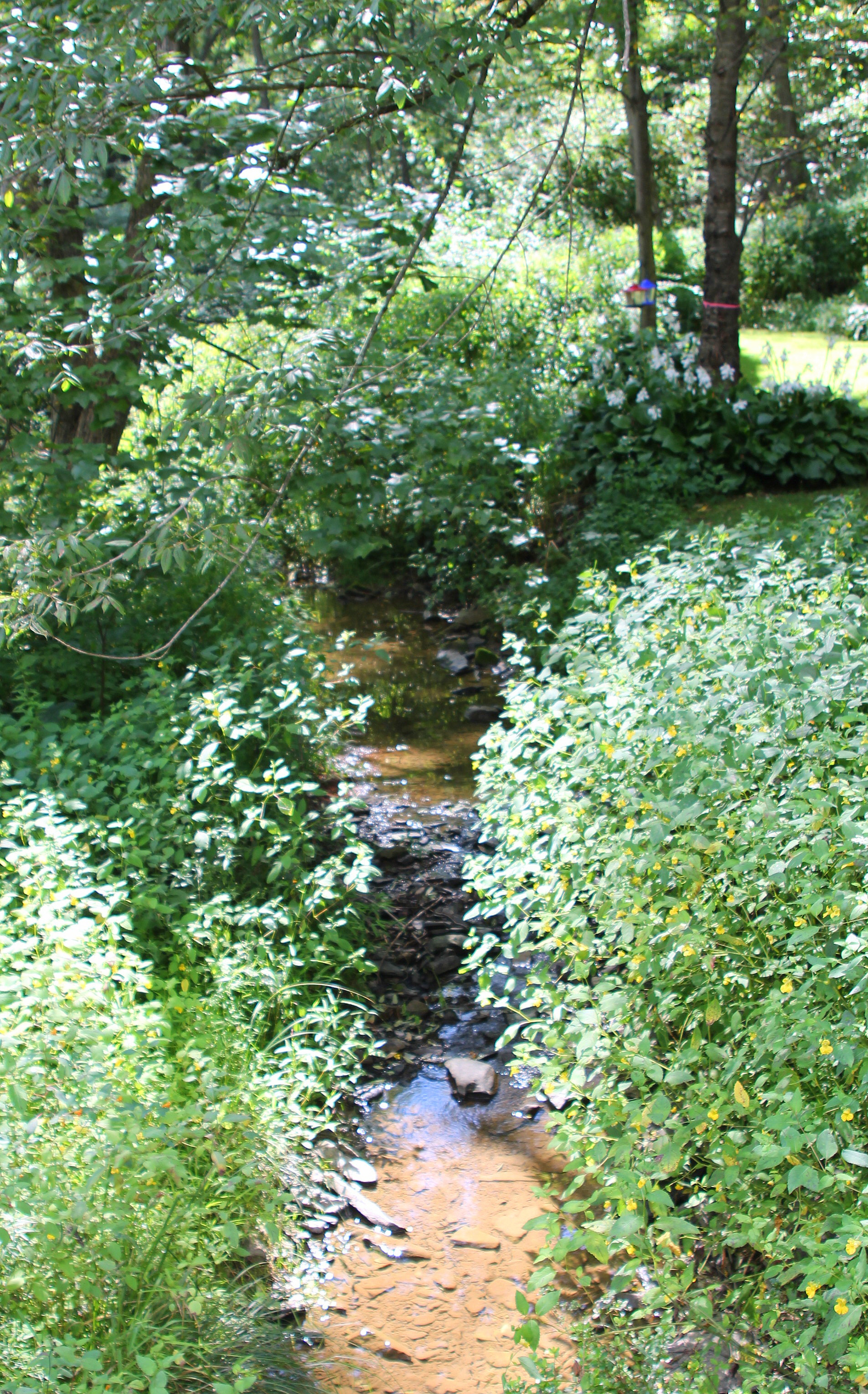
Kipps Run in its upper reaches

80 percent of the rock in the watershed of Kipps Run is interbedded sedimentary rock and 20 percent is sandstone. 80 percent of the soils in the watershed of the stream belong to the hydrologic soil group C. The remaining 20 percent belong to the hydrologic soil group B. The geology of the watershed does not influence the water quality of the stream in any significant way.

The topography of the land around Kipps Run varies by direction. To the east of the stream is a bowl-shaped topographical feature in which the community of Riverside is located. To the west of it and to the south of Sunbury Road, there is a steep rise climbing to more than 900 feet (270 m) above sea level. To the west of the stream and to the north of Sunbury Road, the terrain is largely flat. The stream has an elevation of 443 feet (135 m) above sea level near its mouth.

The comprehensive plan for Riverside describes the channel of Kipps run as "adequate".

The average annual amount of precipitation in the watershed of Kipps Run is 38.2 inches (97 cm) per year. The average annual amount of runoff is 2.1 inches (5.3 cm) per year.

== Watershed ==
The watershed of Kipps Run has an area of 6.38 square miles. 48 percent of the watershed's area is agricultural land and 48 percent is forested land. There are 1099.6 acres of cropland and 617.8 acres of hay and pastures in the watershed. The remaining 4 percent has other uses, such as "low-intensity development", of which there are 175.4 acres in the watershed and "transitional" land, of which there are 7.4 acres in the watershed.

In the area that is to the west of Kipps Run and to the south of Sunbury Road, there is mostly forested land with some farms on the tops of the hills. North of Sunbury Road and west of the stream, there are large tracts of farmland.

Kipps Run is one of the main streams in Riverside, according to the comprehensive plan for the borough.

== History and recreation ==
In 1790, William Gearhart settled near in Northumberland County and gained possession of a tract of land near Kipps Run. Alem Marr Sechler purchased a farm along Kipps Run in 1854. In the late 1800s, the Danville, Hazleton and Wilkes-Barre Railroad passed by Kipps Run.

During a flood in 1904, a gorge in the watershed of Kipps Run helped stop the flooding from affecting areas downstream of Subnbury for several days. The Kipp's Run Swim Club is located in a developed area south of Kipps Run and has been since at least 1962. In the late 1960s, the borough of Riverside had plans to build a pumping station in the vicinity of the stream.

In July 2012, Kipps Run was designated as the reference watershed for the TMDL of Deerlick Run.

== Biology ==
Kipps Run has a sizable riparian buffer.

== See also ==
- Gaskins Run, next tributary of the Susquehanna River going upriver
- Raups Run, next tributary of the Susquehanna River going downriver
- List of rivers of Pennsylvania
