= Gaskins Run =

Coordinates: 40.9540°N 76.6635°W

Physical characteristics
- Source
  - location: Montour Ridge in Liberty Township, Montour County, Pennsylvania
  - elevation: 960 to 980 feet (290 to 300 m)
- Mouth
  - location: Susquehanna River in Point Township, Northumberland County, Pennsylvania
  - elevation: 420 ft (130 m)
- Length: 2.1 mi (3.4 km)
- Basin size: 1.04 mi^{2} (2.7 km^{2})

Basin features
- Progression: Susquehanna River → Chesapeake Bay

Gaskins Run is a tributary of the Susquehanna River in Montour County and Northumberland County, in Pennsylvania, in the United States. It is approximately 2.1 miles (3.4 km) long and flows through Liberty Township, Montour County, Mahoning Township, Montour County. The watershed of the stream has an area of 1.04 square miles (2.7 km^{2}). At least one bridge crosses the stream. It is considered to be both a Coldwater Fishery and a Migratory Fishery.

== Course ==
Gaskins Run begins on Montour Ridge in Liberty Township, Montour County. It flows east for several tenths of a mile, entering Mahoning Township, Montour County and crossing a road. The stream then turns south-southeast for some distance, flowing parallel to the road. It then turns southwest and exits Mahoning Township and Montour County.

Upon exiting Montour County, Gaskins Run enters Point Township, Northumberland County. It continues flowing southwest, on the northern side of Red Point Hill, before turning west-southwest and then south. After several tenths of a mile, the stream crosses U.S. Route 11 and reaches its confluence with the Susquehanna River.

Gaskins Run arrives at its confluence with the Susquehanna River 134.32 miles (216.17 km) upstream of the river's mouth.

== Geography ==
The elevation near the mouth of Gaskins Run is 420 feet (130 m) above sea level. The elevation of the source of the stream is between 960 feet (290 m) and 980 feet (300 m) above sea level. US Route 11 passes near the stream in Point Township, Northumberland County.

A bridge carrying US Route 11 crosses Gaskins Run in Northumberland County, Pennsylvania. The bridge is 15 feet (4.6 m) long and has a deck area of 750 square feet. As of October 2012, it is open to traffic.

== Watershed ==
The watershed of Gaskins Run has an area of 1.04 square miles (2.7 km^{2}). The stream is in the United States Geological Survey quadrangle of Riverside.

== History ==
Gaskins Run was listed in the Geographic Names Information System on August 2, 1979. Its identifier in the Geographic Names Information System is 1175479. The stream was inadvertently left out of the Chapter 93.9 Drainage List, along with several other streams in its vicinity. This error was proposed for correction of February 25, 2013. Resurfacing a stretch of US Route 11 near the stream has been proposed. The cost of this would be $954,500. The bridge carrying US Route 11 over Gaskins Run was repaired after a flood in 1996 for a cost of $4,000.

== Biology ==
Gaskins Run is considered to be a Coldwater Fishery and a Migratory Fishery. All of the other tributaries of the Susquehanna River between Mahoning Creek and the West Branch Susquehanna River also hold these designations.

== See also ==
- Mahoning Creek (Susquehanna River), next tributary of the Susquehanna River going upriver
- Kipps Run, next tributary of the Susquehanna River going downriver
- List of rivers of Pennsylvania
