= Lithia Springs Creek =

Lithia Springs Creek Johnsons Run, Lithia Spring Creek
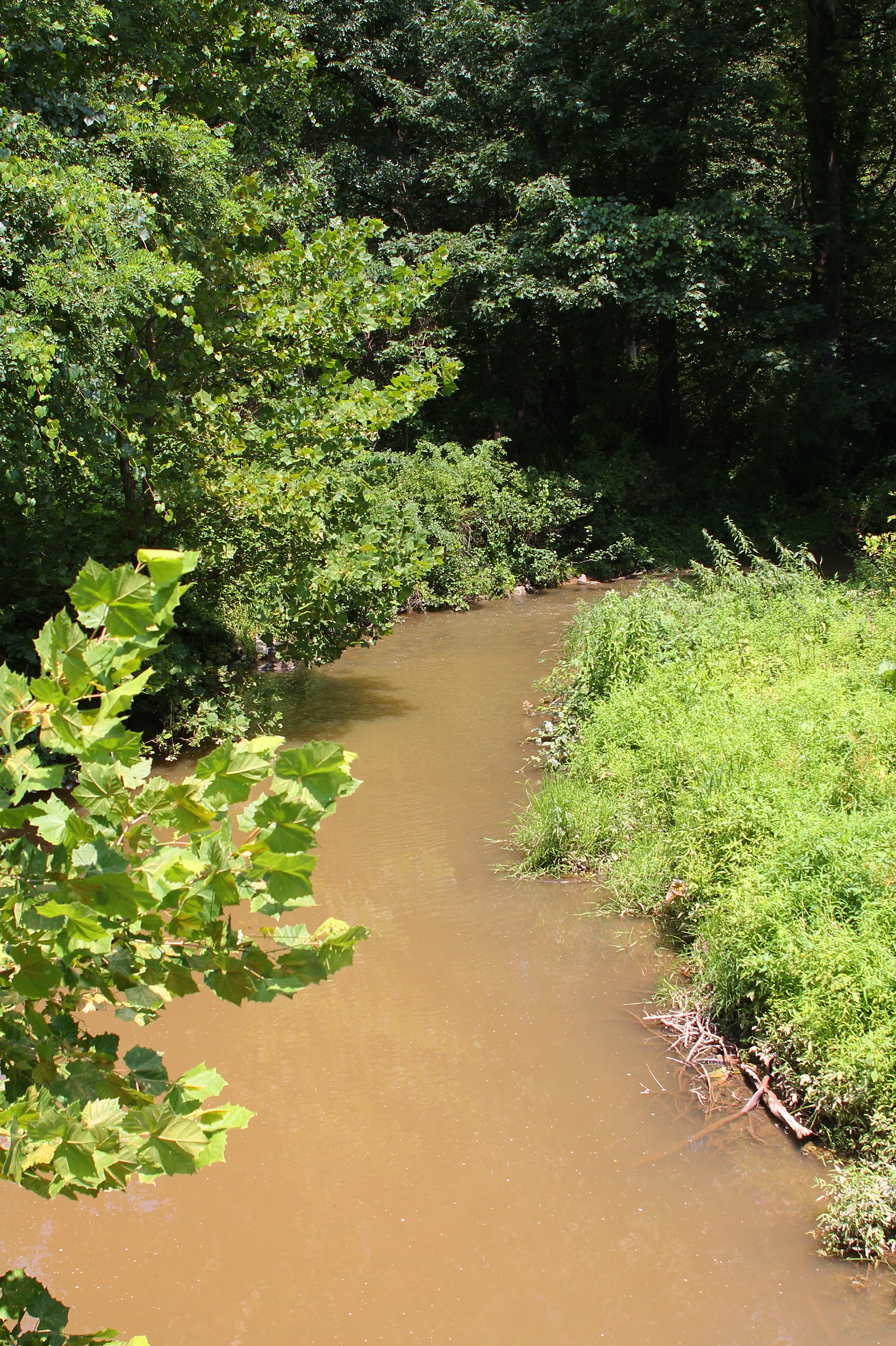
- Lithia Springs Creek looking upstream

Physical characteristics
- Source
  - location: Montour Ridge in Point Township, Pennsylvania
  - elevation: between 700 and 720 ft (210 and 220 m)
- Mouth
  - location: Susquehanna River in Point Township, Pennsylvania
  - coordinates: 40°54′19″N 76°45′53″W
  - elevation: 436 ft (133 m)
- Length: 3.2 mi (5.1 km)
- Basin size: 8.96 mi^{2} (23.2 km^{2})

Basin features
- Progression: Susquehanna River → Chesapeake Bay
- Tributaries
  - right: Johnson Creek

Lithia Springs Creek (also known as Johnsons Run or Lithia Spring Creek) is a tributary of the Susquehanna River in Northumberland County, Pennsylvania, in the United States. It is approximately 3.2 miles (5.1 km) long and flows through Point Township. The watershed of the creek has an area of 8.96 square miles (23.2 km^{2}). It has a named tributary known as Johnson Creek. Waste of various types is discharged into Lithia Springs Creek from a variety of sources. At least one bridge more than 20 feet (6.1 m) long crosses the creek. The creek is considered to be a Coldwater Fishery and a Migratory Fishery. It is inhabited by wild trout and possibly a few other species of fish.

== Course ==
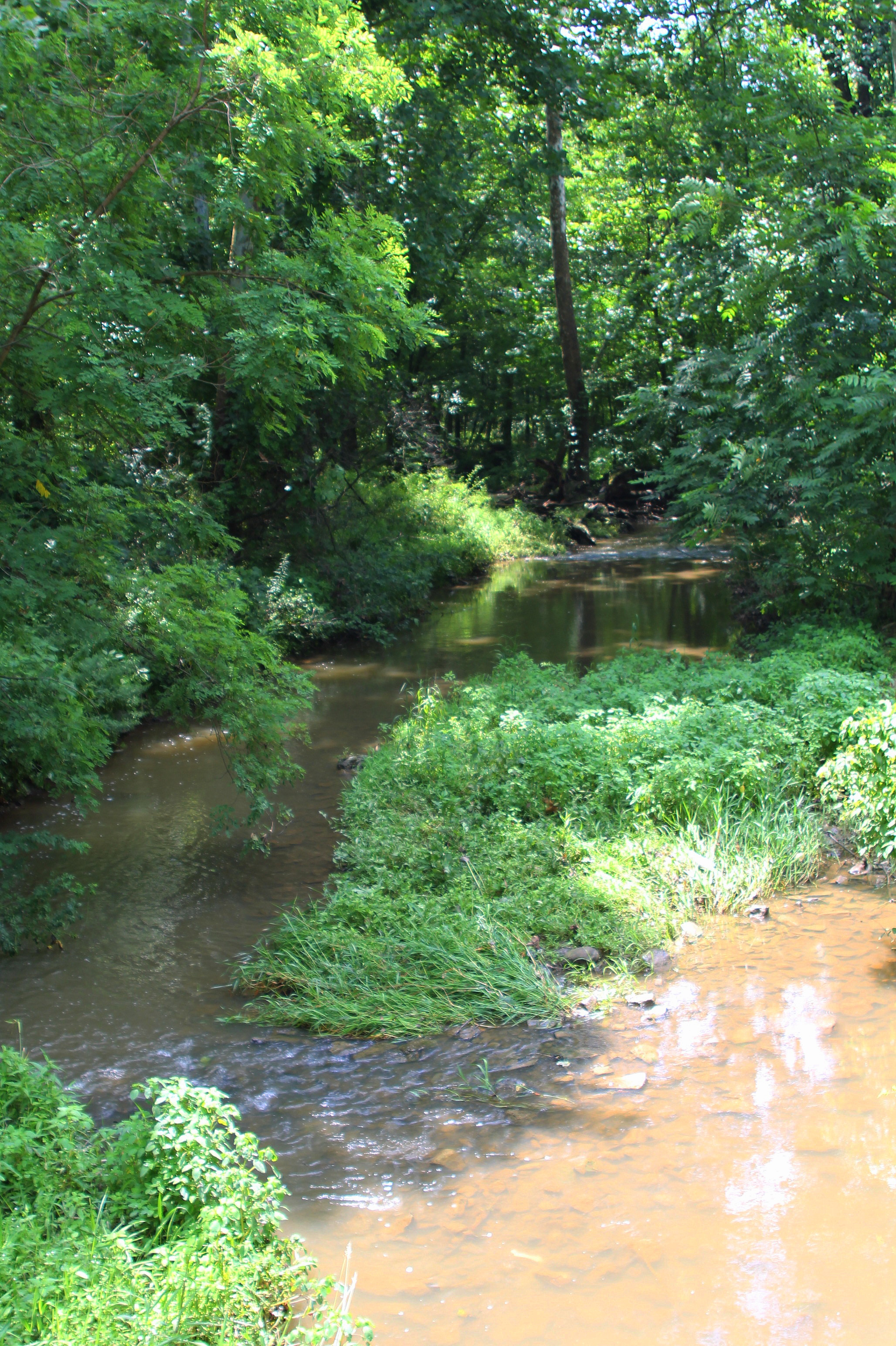
Lithia Springs Creek looking downstream in its lower reaches

Lithia Springs Creek begins near Hookies Road on Montour Ridge in Point Township. It flows south and slightly west for a few tenths of a mile before turning southeast and receiving an unnamed tributary. It then turns north and slightly west again, receiving Johnson Creek, its only named tributary, after a few tenths of a mile. The creek, then turns west for a few hundred feet before turning south for more than a mile, passing by the community of Lithia Springs. At this point, it turns west and then roughly south-southwest, crossing US Route 11. Some distance later, the creek reaches its confluence with the Susquehanna River.

Lithia Springs Creek joins the Susquehanna River 127.82 miles (205.71 km) upstream of its mouth.

=== Tributaries ===
Lithia Springs Creek has one named tributary and a number of unnamed tributaries. The named tributary is known as Johnson Creek. Johnson Creek joins Lithia Springs Creek 1.64 miles (2.64 km) upstream of its mouth. Its watershed has an area of 4.09 square miles (10.6 km^{2}).

== Geography ==
The elevation at the mouth of Lithia Springs Creek is 436 feet (133 m) above sea level. The elevation of the creek's source is between 700 feet (210 m) and 720 feet (220 m) above sea level.

There is an unnamed stormwater canal in the vicinity of Lithia Springs Creek. The headwaters of the creek are on Montour Ridge. An unnamed swale is also located in the watershed.

Lithia Springs Creek enters the Susquehanna River on the river's right bank.

The Lithia Spring Sewer Project discharges water into Lithia Springs Creek, as well as its tributary Johnson Creek. The Tulpehocken Water Company discharges industrial waste into an unnamed tributary of Lithia Springs Creek.

== Watershed ==
The watershed of Lithia Springs Creek has an area of 8.96 square miles (23.2 km^{2}). Both the mouth and the source of the creek are in the United States Geological Survey quadrangle of Northumberland.

An industrial area owned by the North Shore Railroad Company is in the vicinity of Lithia Springs Creek. The industrial area runs from the creek to Bulk Plant Road and has the potential to be expanded. A tract of land that has been zoned for R-1 development spans an area from immediately west of the creek eastwards to Ridge Road. Some of this land, especially in the community of Lithia Springs and near Ridge Road has been developed residentially, but there is potential for further residential development in the area, especially near the creek itself.

== History ==
According to an article by Don Steese in The Daily Item, Lithia Springs Creek may have been stocked for a short time by the Pennsylvania Fish and Boat Commission in the late 1960s and early 1970s.

A dam was constructed on Lithia Springs Creek in 1960 for the purpose serving as a water supply. The dam was made of concrete and was 5 feet (1.5 m) tall. However, it was torn down due to economic and safety concerns. The water quality of the creek was improved as a result.

Lithia Springs Creek was entered into the Geographic Names Information System on August 2, 1979. Its identifier in the Geographic Names Information System is 1179453.

A prestressed box beam bridge was built over Lithia Springs Creek in 1991. It is 47.9 feet (14.6 m) long and carries Point Township Road T-702. There was historically a building belonging to a water company on the creek. However, it is no longer standing. The construction of a sewage treatment plant on the creek was proposed in the 1960s.

== Biology ==
Wild trout naturally reproduce in Lithia Springs Creek between its upper reaches and the bridge that carries US Route 11 over the creek. The trout inhabit a total of 1.79 miles (2.88 km) of the creek. It is on the Pennsylvania Fish and Boat Commission's list of wild trout streams. The creek is considered to be a Coldwater Fishery and a Migratory Fishery. It is described as a "nice little trout stream" by Don Steese in an article in The Daily Item. Small shiners and creek chubs have historically been observed and caught in it.

== See also ==
- Gravel Run, next tributary of the Susquehanna River going upriver
- West Branch Susquehanna River, next tributary of the Susquehanna River going upriver
- List of rivers of Pennsylvania
