= Kip's Castle Park =

County park in New Jersey

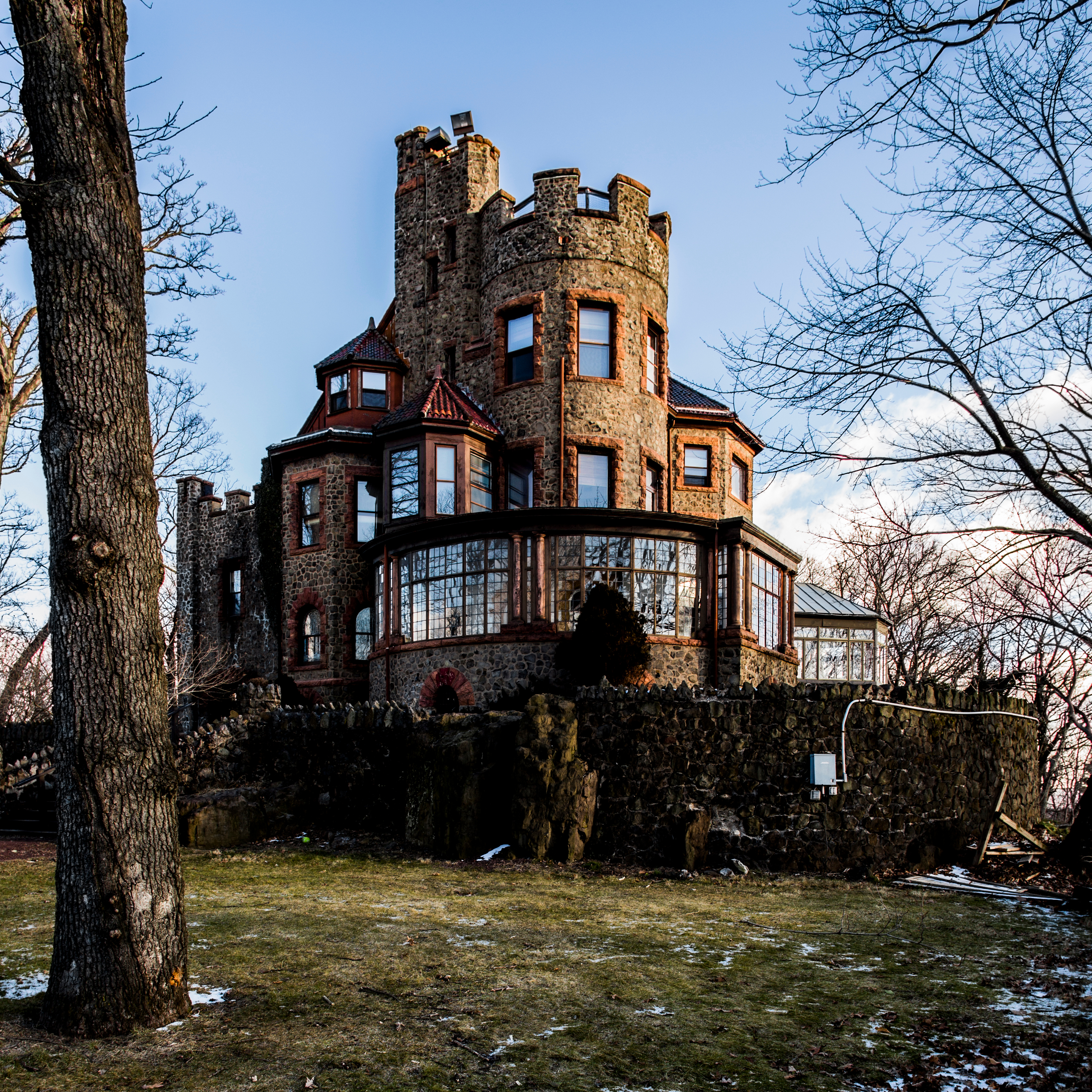

- Location within Essex County, New Jersey Location within New Jersey Location within the United States
- Type: Public Park
- Location: 22 Crestmont Road; Verona, New Jersey
- Coordinates: 40.829167°N 74.224444°W
- Area: 14.85 acres (60,100 m^{2})
- Created: 2007
- Operator: Essex County

Kip's Castle, is a 10-acre (40,000 m^{2}) estate (8 acres in Verona, 2 acres (8,100 m^{2}) in Montclair) on the ridge of First Mountain, on the border of Montclair and Verona townships. It contains a 9,000-square-foot (840 m^{2}) mansion that replicates a medieval Norman castle, and a 6,000-square-foot (560 m^{2}) two-story carriage house.

Originally built as a private residence, current plans for the estate include housing offices for various administrative functions for Essex County. However, the Castle is planned to evolve into a premiere cultural resource center, supporting and promoting arts and culture throughout the region. Meeting space will be available for conservancies, community groups, and non-profit organizations. A calendar of ongoing educational programming will be developed, and museum space will be created to showcase the history of the Essex County Park System.

A twelve-member Advisory Board has been formed to provide recommendations about not only how to maintain and restore the estate, but also to develop ideas as to how this property can grow into a cultural asset for the community.

== History ==
Kip's Castle, originally known as "Kypsburg," was constructed over a three-year period in the early 1900s by Frederic Ellsworth Kip and his wife, Charlotte Bishop Williams Kip. Frederic was a wealthy textile inventor and industrialist who also published several books related to United States tariff laws.

Frederic Ellsworth Kip

Charlotte is credited for the design of the "Kypsburg" building and grounds, cultivating an octagonal rose garden in the southwest corner of the property. After Charlotte's death in 1926, the estate was sold and went through several owners, including Indian guru Osho in the 1980s, serving as a monastery.

The building and grounds fell into a state of dilapidation until 1985 when the law firm of Schwartz, Tobia & Stanziale purchased the property. Through 2005 a considerable amount of work was done to restore the Castle to its original grandeur. In the early 2000s, The law firm wanted to develop townhouses on the property, however, found itself in various legal complications and lawsuits with Verona, and in 2006, the property was placed on the market. As a result of grants from the NJ Green Acres Program and the Essex County Recreation and Open Space Trust Fund, the County of Essex purchased Kip's Castle in March 2007. The property is now part of the historic Essex County Park System.

Offices for the County Division of Cultural and Historic Affairs, the Essex County Recreation and Open Space Committee and Essex County Park Foundation will be located in the castle, which is also a meeting site for the twelve-member Kip's Castle Park Advisory Board appointed by the County Executive to provide guidance about the maintenance, restoration, activities, and growth of the facility as another asset for the Essex community. According to the county brochure, over time, Kip's Castle Park will become the County's premiere cultural resource center, supporting and promoting arts and culture throughout the region. Meeting space will be available for community groups, and non-profit organizations. A calendar of ongoing educational programming will be developed, and museum space will be created to showcase the history of the Essex County Park System.

=== Cranetown Triangulation Site ===
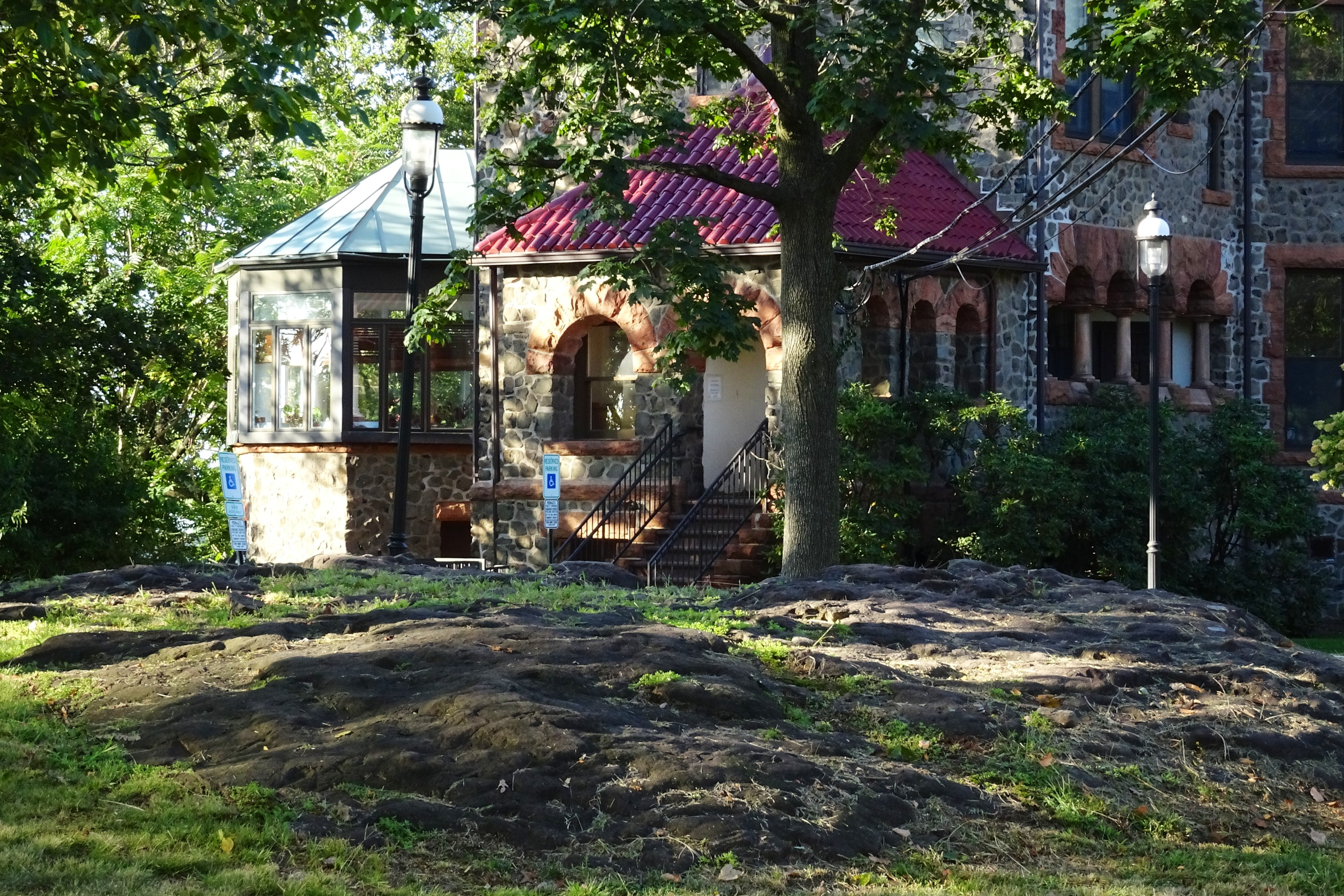
Rock outcropping near triangulation site

Kip's Castle is location of the former Cranetown Triangulation Site, one of the first triangulation stations established in 1817 by Ferdinand Hassler for the U.S. Survey of the Coast and was used to map New York Harbor. A search by personnel of the New Jersey Geodetic Control Survey and the National Geodetic Survey in 1984 to locate Hassler's surveying mark at Cranetown (former name for Montclair) was unsuccessful, as the station was determined to be under Kip's Castle and the rock outcropping that it had been set on might have been cut away when the house was constructed. The Cranetown Triangulation Site was designated as a National Historic Civil Engineering Landmark by the American Society of Civil Engineers in 1986.
