= Raups Run =

Physical characteristics
- Source
  - location: area near Candy Lane on Montour Ridge in Point Township, Pennsylvania
  - elevation: between 960 and 980 feet (290 and 300 m)
- Mouth
  - location: Susquehanna River in Point Township, Pennsylvania
  - coordinates: 40°56′54″N 76°40′09″W
  - elevation: 420 ft (130 m)
- Length: 0.7 mi (1.1 km)
- Basin size: 0.54 sq mi (1.4 km^{2})

Basin features
- Progression: Susquehanna River → Chesapeake Bay

Raups Run is a tributary of the Susquehanna River in Northumberland County, Pennsylvania, in the United States. It is approximately 0.7 miles (1.1 km) long and flows through Point Township. The watershed of the stream has an area of 0.54 square miles (1.4 km^{2}). The stream is considered to be a Coldwater Fishery and a Migratory Fishery. It was entered into the Geographic Names Information System on August 2, 1979.

== Course ==
Raups Run begins near Candy Lane on Montour Ridge in Point Township. It flows southeast, parallel to Candy Lane, for several hundred feet. The stream then turns south and slightly east and continues to flow parallel to Candy Lane. It passes between two small ponds and a few hundred feet further downstream turns east, crossing US Route 11 almost immediately. The stream then turns southeast and begins flowing roughly parallel to Brookaw Drive for several hundred feet. It then turns southwest for a few hundred feet before turning southeast again. The stream reaches its confluence with the Susquehanna River almost immediately afterwards.

Raups Run arrives at its confluence with the Susquehanna River 133.86 miles (215.43 km) upstream of the latter river's mouth.

== Geography ==
The elevation near the mouth of Raups Run is 420 feet (130 m) above sea level. The elevation of the source of the stream is between 560 feet (170 m) and 580 feet (180 m).

== Watersheds ==
The watershed of Raups Run has an area of 0.54 square miles (1.4 km^{2}). The stream is in the United States Geological Survey quadrangle of Riverside.

== History ==
Raups Run was added to the Geographic Names Information System on August 2, 1979. Its identifier in the Geographic Names Information System is 1184702. According to staff from the Pennsylvania Fish and Boat Commission, the stream was inadvertently left out of the Chapter 93.9 Drainage List, along with several other streams in its vicinity. This error was proposed for correction of February 25, 2013. However, the streams were not added to the list. They instead remain listed as unnamed tributaries of the Susquehanna River, as of 2013.

== Biology ==
Raups Run is considered to be a Coldwater Fishery and a Migratory Fishery. Additionally, all of the tributaries of the Susquehanna River between Mahoning Creek and the West Branch Susquehanna River have these designations.

== See also ==
- Packers Run, next tributary of the Susquehanna River going downriver
- Kipps Run, next tributary of the Susquehanna River going upriver
- List of rivers of Pennsylvania
