= Johnson Creek (Lithia Springs Creek tributary) =

Johnson Creek Johnson's Creek
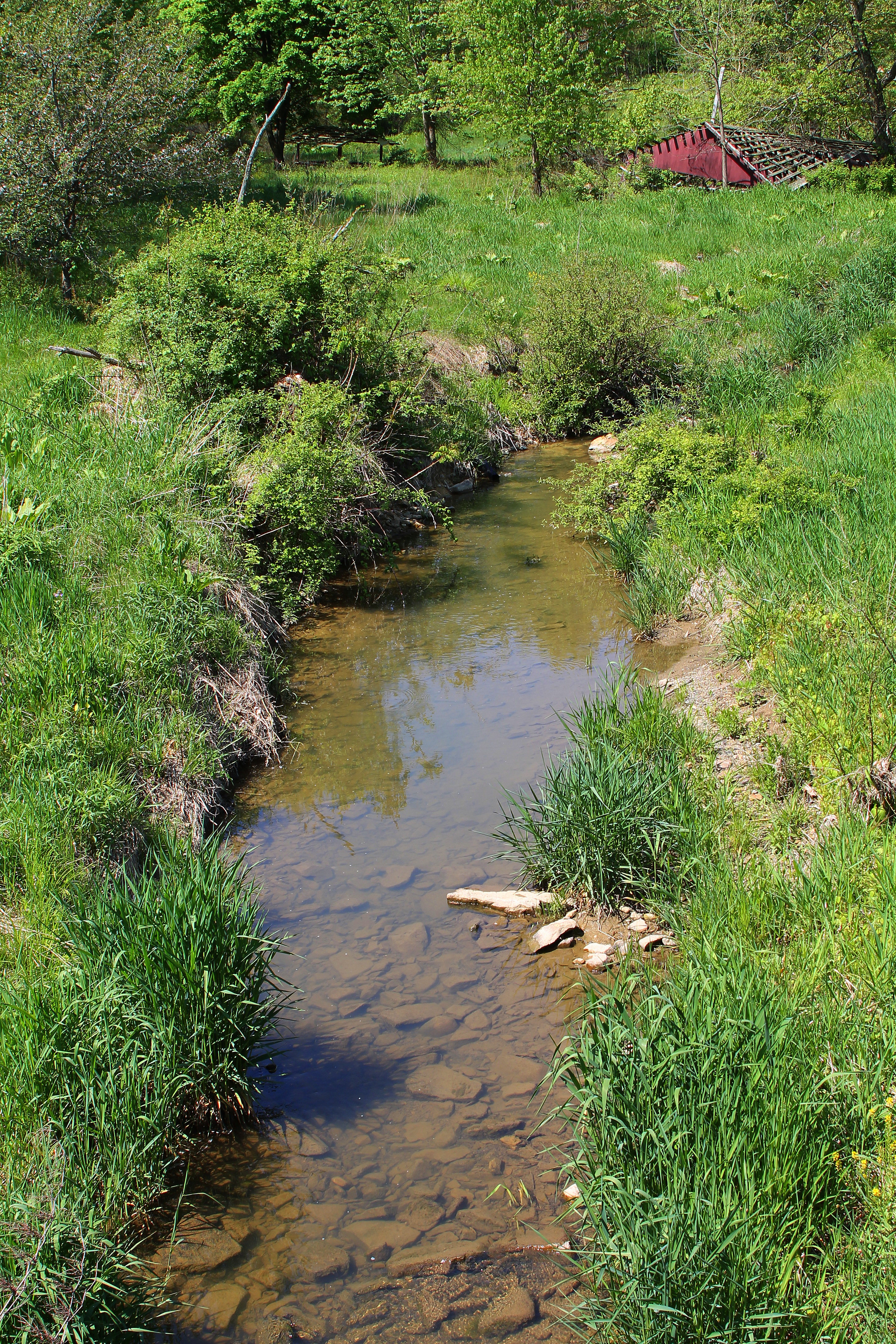
- Johnson Creek looking upstream

Physical characteristics
- Source
  - location: valley on Montour Ridge in Point Township, Pennsylvania
  - elevation: 800 ft (240 m)
- Mouth
  - location: Lithia Springs Creek in Point Township, Pennsylvania
  - coordinates: 40°55′27″N 76°45′56″W
  - elevation: 486 ft (148 m)
- Length: 2.3 mi (3.7 km)
- Basin size: 4.09 mi^{2} (10.6 km^{2})

Basin features
- Progression: Lithia Springs Creek → Susquehanna River → Chesapeake Bay

Johnson Creek (also known as Johnson's Creek) is a tributary of Lithia Springs Creek in Northumberland County, Pennsylvania, in the United States. It is approximately 2.3 miles (3.7 km) long and flows through Point Township. The watershed of the creek has an area of 4.09 square miles (10.6 km^{2}). It has no named tributaries, but has at least one unnamed tributary. A ridge known as Montour Ridge is in the watershed of the creek and a ravine with high levels of biodiversity is present on one if its tributaries. The creek is considered to be a Coldwater Fishery and a Migratory Fishery.

== Course ==
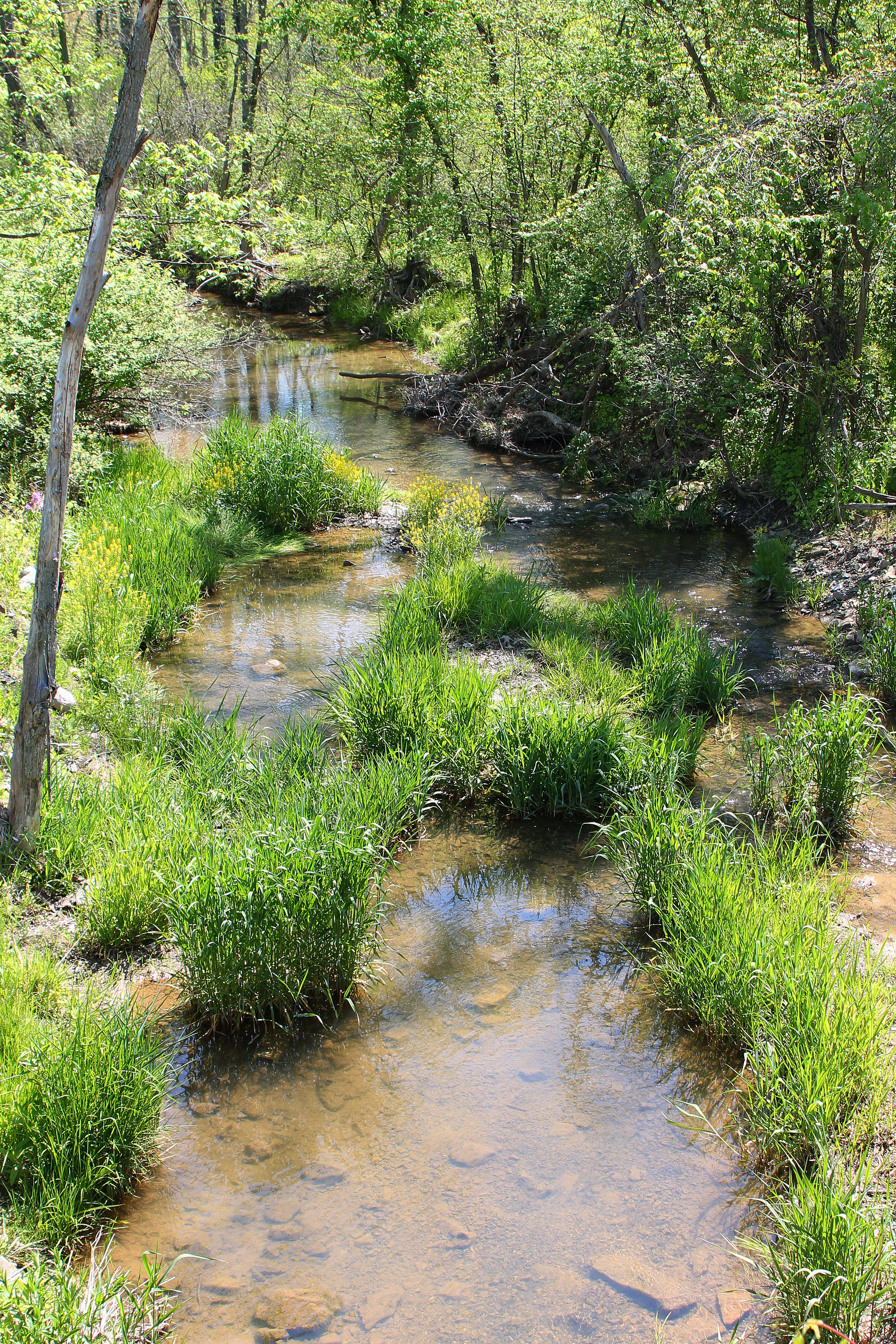
Johnson Creek looking downstream

Johnson Creek begins in a valley on Montour Ridge in Point Township. It flows south-southeast for several hundred feet and exits the valley. It then turns south for several tenths of a mile before turning south-southeast again for more than a mile. In this stretch, the creek receives two unnamed tributaries and enters another valley. It then receives two more unnamed tributaries and turns east and slightly north. After approximately a mile, it reaches its confluence with Lithia Springs Creek.

Johnson Creek joins Lithia Springs Creek 1.64 miles (2.64 km) upstream of its mouth.

=== Tributaries ===
Johnson Creek has no named tributaries. However, it has a number of unnamed tributaries, including at least one that is fed by a spring.

== Geography ==
The elevation at the mouth of Johnson Creek is 486 feet (148 m) above sea level. The elevation of the creek's source slightly under 800 feet (240 m) above sea level.

A ridge known as Montour Ridge is in the vicinity of Johnson Creek. A tributary of the creek flows through a ravine known as the Montour Ridge Ravine, which is situated on the ridge. The creek is the only stream in Northumberland or Point Township to have a 100 year floodplain.

Water from the Lithia Spring Sewer Project discharges into Johnson Creek. Expansion of sewage collection lines near the creek has been proposed in the __.

== Watershed ==
The watershed of Johnson Creek has an area of 4.09 square miles (10.6 km^{2}). The creek is in the United States Geological Survey quadrangle of Northumberland. It is approximately 3 miles (4.8 km) northeast of the community of Northumberland. The Montour Ridge Ravine, which a tributary of the creek flows through, is listed as a Locally Significant Area in the Northumberland County Natural Areas Inventory and is given a rank of "high" in the inventory. The ravine is on private land.

== History ==
Johnson Creek was entered into the Geographic Names Information System on August 2, 1979. Its identifier in the Geographic Names Information System is 1178111.

Permission was requested of the supervisors of Point Township to construct a bridge over Johnson Creek in around 1917.

== Biology ==
Hemlocks line the Montour Ridge Ravine, which a tributary of Johnson Creek flows through. This area has a high level of plant and animal biodiversity. Plant species such as spicebush, Canada mayflower, wild sarsaparilla, skunk cabbage, jack-in-the-pulpit, red maple, striped maple, Allegheny blackberry, witch-hazel, basswood, beech, and violets. Various salamander species, such as Eurycea bislineata, Gyrinophilus porphyriticus, and Desmognathus fuscus fuscus also inhabit the area. The hemlock wooly adelgid has also been observed in the ravine.

Johnson Creek is considered to be a Coldwater Fishery and a Migratory Fishery.

== See also ==
- List of rivers of Pennsylvania
