= Wilson Run (Kipps Run tributary) =

River in Northumberland County, Pennsylvania, USA

Wilson Run Wilsons Run, Wilson's Run
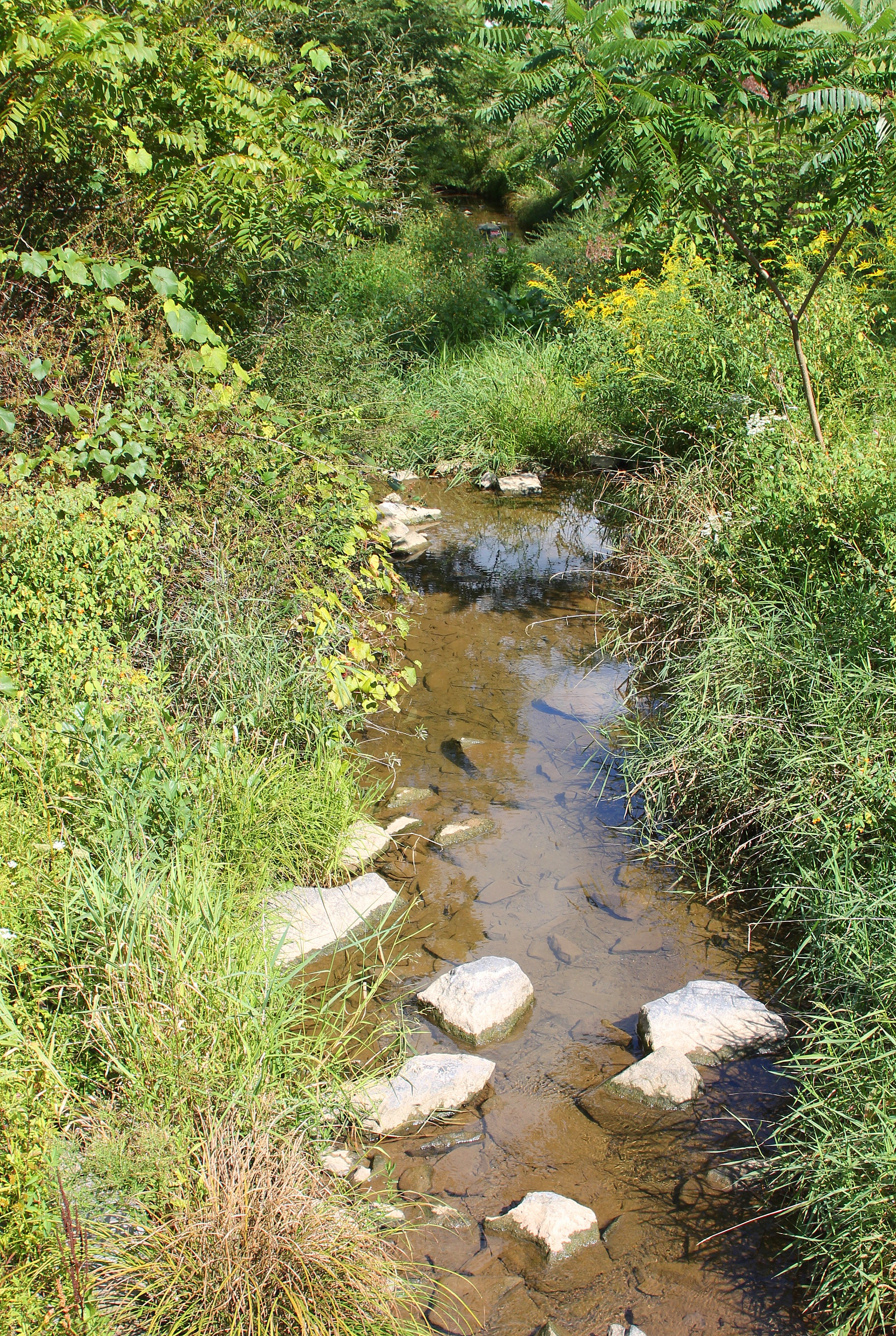
- Wilson Run looking downstream

Physical characteristics
- Source
  - location: hill in Rush Township, Northumberland County, Pennsylvania
  - elevation: 920 ft (280 m)
- Mouth
  - location: Kipps Run in Riverside, Northumberland County, Pennsylvania
  - coordinates: 40°56′26″N 76°38′30″W
  - elevation: 528 ft (161 m)
- Length: 3.6 mi (5.8 km)
- Basin size: 3.27 sq mi (8.5 km^{2})

Basin features
- Progression: Kipps Run → Susquehanna River → Chesapeake Bay

Wilson Run (also known as Wilsons Run or Wilson's Run) is a tributary of Kipps Run in Northumberland County, Pennsylvania, in the United States. It is approximately 3.6 miles (5.8 km) long and flows through Rush Township and Riverside. The watershed of the stream has an area of 3.27 square miles (8.5 km^{2}). The drainage basin is considered to be a Coldwater Fishery and a Migratory Fishery. At least three bridges cross the stream and a mill historically existed on it. Sandstone has been observed in its vicinity.

== Course ==
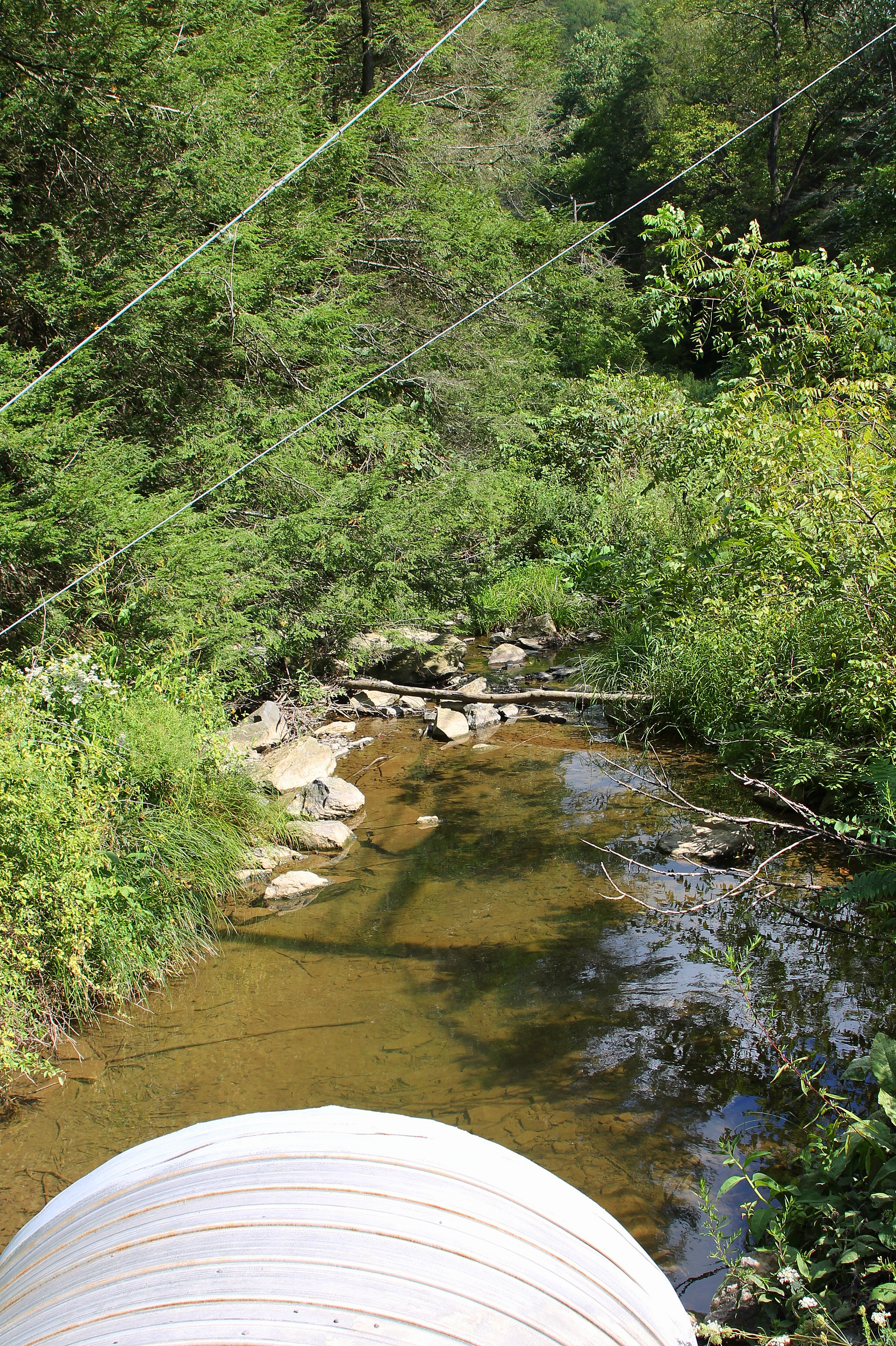
Wilson Run looking downstream

Wilson Run begins on a hill in Rush Township. It flows northwest for a short distance before entering a shallow valley and turning north. After several tenths of a mile, it turns northeast and crosses State Route 4004. The stream then turns north-northwest for more than a mile, flowing parallel to Pine Swamp Road. Its valley becomes deeper and then it enters Riverside. After a few hundred feet in Riverside, the stream turns northeast for a few tenths of a mile and then reaches its confluence with Kipps Run.

Wilson Run joins Kipps Run 1.54 miles (2.48 km) upstream of its mouth.

== Geography ==
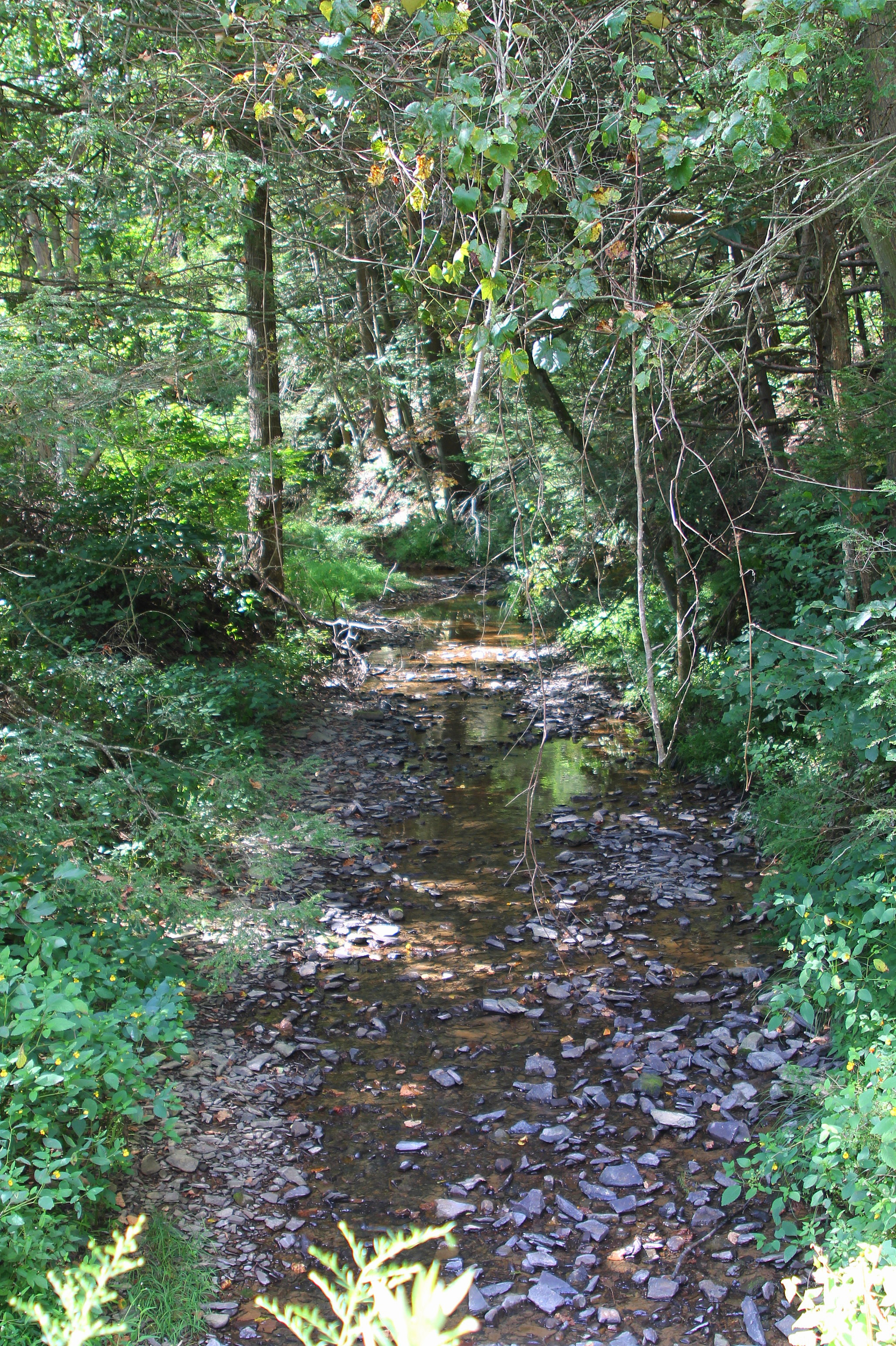
Wilson Run looking upstream

The elevation near the mouth of Wilson Run is 528 feet (161 m) above sea level. The elevation of the stream's source is slightly less than 920 feet (280 m) above sea level.

In the past, the flow of Wilson Run was restricted by fallen trees, logs, gravel bars, and rocks. This restriction caused erosion of the banks of the stream. However, its channel was restored by 1980. Sandstone belonging to the Trimmers Rock Formation have been observed near Wilson Run.

== Watershed ==
The watershed of Wilson Run has an area of 3.27 square miles (8.5 km^{2}). The stream is in the United States Geological Survey quadrangle of Riverside.

Wilson Run is one of the main streams in Rush Township.

== History ==
A mill was historically located on Wilson Run. It was owned by a person named Vastine.

Wilson Run was entered into the Geographic Names Information System on August 2, 1979. Its identifier in the Geographic Names Information System is 1191548. The stream was erroneously listed as a tributary of the Susquehanna River in 1978 and 1979 lawmaking.

A concrete tee beam bridge was built over Wilson Run in 1957. It is 26.9 feet (8.2 m) long. Another bridge was built over the stream in Riverside in 1961 and repaired in 2012. It is a prestressted box beam bridge that is 32.2 feet (9.8 m) long. A concrete slab bridge was built over the stream in Riverside in 1986. This bridge is 23.0 feet (7.0 m) long.

A bridge carrying Kipps Run Road over Wilson Run was replaced at some point in the past. The bridge replacement cost $60,000. This project was planned in 2012.

== Biology ==
Wilson Run is considered to be a Coldwater Fishery and also a Migratory Fishery throughout its drainage basin. The right valve of a M. mytiloides fossil has been observed in a sandstone formation in the vicinity of the stream.

== See also ==
- List of rivers of Pennsylvania
