= Kip (surname) =

Kip is a surname. Notable people with the surname include:

- Arthur F. Kip (1910–1995), American physicist
- Frederic Kip (1862-1938), American industrialist
- George Goelet Kip (1845-1926), a prominent American lawyer
- Hendrick Hendricksen Kip (1600–1685), Dutch magistrate in New Amsterdam
- Ismaël Kip (born 1987), Dutch professional racing cyclist
- Jan Kip (1652/3–1722), Dutch artist active in England
- Leonard Kip (1826–1906), American writer
- Ricardo Kip (born 1992), Dutch footballer
- William Ingraham Kip (1811–1893), American Episcopal bishop
