= Frederic Kip =

American industrialist (1862–1938)

- Born: Frederic Ellsworth Kip; January 1, 1862; Passaic, New Jersey, U.S.
- Died: January 22, 1938 (aged 76); Montclair, New Jersey, U.S.
- Occupation: Industrialist
- Known for: Kip's Castle
- Notable work: Equal Opportunity for All (pamphlet)

Frederic Ellsworth Kip (January 1, 1862 – January 22, 1938) was a wealthy textile inventor and industrialist. He built Kip's Castle from 1902 to 1905. He also published several books on United States tariff laws.

== Life ==
Kip was born in Passaic, New Jersey, the son and ninth child of Nicholas and Susan Pinkham Worcester Kip.

Kip's first job was as an office boy in 1878. From 1882 to 1892, he worked at Frederick, Victor & Achilles, rising from salesman to manager. He then went into business with others buying several companies. He became president of the Kip-Armstrong Co and the Salts Textile Manufacturing Company.

Kip and his wife, Charlotte, built Kip's Castle, also known as "Kypsburg", from 1902 to 1905; the home was located on the border of Montclair and Verona.

In 1916, he was one of 28 New Jersey delegates to the Republican convention.

In 1921, Kip acquired the Clifton estate in Nassau, Bahamas. Later that year, he purchased the city's Waterloo estate from the J S Johnson Company.

Kip's first wife died in 1931. In 1932, he was injured when he crashed his car into a pole. At the beginning of the 1930s, Kip also became embroiled in a dispute with the city of Montclair, New Jersey which resulted in him being charged with illegally operating a gas station on his property. After years and four arrests, the city passed an ordinance rezoning his property to permit a filling station.

== Critical reception ==
Of his pamphlet, Equal Opportunity for All, The Montclair Times said he "has written an interesting and well digested booklet, which,... contains a good deal of pregnant truth and its suggestions will stimulate sound thinking among those who have studied our great domestic problems with some conscience."

== Death ==
Kip married his first wife, Charlotte Bishop Williams in 1884. She died in 1926. His second wife, Louise Taylor Kip, died in 1931.

Kip died by suicide on January 22, 1938, at his home in Montclair. He was 76. He was survived by his son, Ruloff F. Kip, his brother, Abraham L. Kip, and four grandchildren.

== Works ==
- Kip, Frederic Ellsworth. (1928). History of the Kip Family in America. Hudson Printing Co.
- Kip, Frederic Ellsworth. (1999). Equal Opportunity for all as Against Special Benefits to a Privileged Few.
