= Wilson Run (Little Muskingum River tributary) =

Stream in Ohio, U.S.

Coordinates: 39°33′35″N 81°10′14″W

Wilson Run is a stream in the U.S. state of Ohio. It is a tributary to the Little Muskingum River.

Wilson Run was named after Israel Wilson, a local hunter.
