= Arthur Kipps =

Arthur Kipps is the name of the protagonist in two distinct works of fiction.

HG Wells character

- The main character in HG Wells novel Kipps
- The same character in derivative works:
  - Kipps (1921 film), starring George K. Arthur in the role
  - Kipps (1941 film), starring Michael Redgrave in the role
  - Half a Sixpence, a musical comedy starring Tommy Steele
  - Half a Sixpence (film), a film version of the musical, also starring Tommy Steele

Susan Hill character

- The main character in the Susan Hill novel The Woman in Black
- The same character in derivative works:
  - The Woman in Black (play), a 1987 stage play
  - The Woman in Black (1989 film), a television film
  - The Woman in Black (2012 film), a cinematic release film, starring Daniel Radcliffe
