= Kip-up =

Gymnastics move

Video of a kip-up

A nip-up performed during an acro dance routine

A kip-up or kick-up (also called a rising handspring, Chinese get up, kick-to-stand, nip-up, flip-up, or carp skip-up) is an acrobatic move in which a person transitions from a supine, and less commonly, a prone position version known as prone get-up, to a standing position. It is used in activities such as breakdancing, acro dance, gymnastics, martial arts (specifically kung fu), professional wrestling, and freerunning, and in action film fight sequences.

It is executed by propelling the body away from the floor so that the performer is momentarily airborne, and typically ends with the performer standing in a squatting position.

Not only does the kip-up require muscle activation and strength, but it also requires proper technique for successful completion. A practitioner must perform the preparation phase (initiation of movement until directly before flight), aerial phase (time spent in flight), and landing phase (time from touchdown of the feet to maintenance of balanced standing) using specific accelerations, angular velocities, and joint positions of the extremities in order to land on their feet.

== Execution and physics ==
=== From a supine position ===
Kip-up from supine position

The performer draws both legs (which may be either in extension or flexion) anterior to the chest, rotates back onto the shoulders, and optionally places hands on the floor proximal to the ears. The performer then moves from hip and knee flexion to hip and knee extension while elevating the body away from the floor. The performer creates force against the ground by pushing off with the hands and simultaneously moving the elbows from flexion to extension.

The leg motion during the thrust involves increasing the joint angle of the hip from flexion to extension. When the thrust is completed, the rotation of the legs with respect to the trunk is terminated and, as a result, the angular momentum of the legs is transferred to the entire body. The linear momentum of the thrust carries the body into the air feet first while the angular momentum causes the airborne body to rotate. The spine moves into greater lordosis so that with sufficient thrust, back curvature, and body rotation, the performer will land on the feet.

=== From prone position ===
With body face-down, the performer creates forces against the floor with fists or palms while kicking back the legs so as to develop momentum that carries the body into the air. The performer lands with the feet in contact with the floor, and knees in flexion.

In diving, the body is bent at the hips with the legs straight and extended without bending the knees during the jump, the feet tight and the toes extended.

== Variations ==
Kinematic variations
| Name | Description |
|---|---|
| Knee extension kip-up | The distinguishing feature to this is that the knees remain in extension while they are brought to the chest. All other movements remain the same to the standard kip up. Keeping the knees in extension causes the inertial properties of the practitioner to change, thus making it more difficult to return to standing than if the individual's knees were in flexion. |
| No hands kip-up | This variation is considered more difficult because it generally requires more force to be exerted on the shoulders and cervical spine. A distinguishing feature of the Wushu version is the change in hand positioning. The hands are placed directly superior to the knees as the legs are brought anterior and proximal to the chest. From there the cervical spine and shoulders create force into the ground in order to add extra velocity to the legs as they recoil back to land. Practically every variation of the original kip-up can be done without hands and springing up from the shoulders and cervical spine. |
| Prone kip-up | With body face-down, the performer pushes against the floor with fists or palms while kicking back the legs so as to develop momentum that carries the body into the air. The performer lands in a squatting position. The feet may not be utilized. |
| Rolling kip | A kip-up executed from a push up (prone, knee extension, hip extension, shoulder flexion, palms on the floor, and toes on the floor, trunk and legs remain aerial while the hands and feet hold the individual for support) or kneeling position. The practitioner starts rotating their body toward the anterior, hips and knees move into flexion, while the hands move inferior toward the floor. The individual discontinues halfway through the movement and instead of rolling over to his or her feet, the legs are held back and proximal to the chest. This sets up the practitioner to create force against the ground and do a kip-up. |
| Headspring | Also known as "head kip", it is a move that consists of getting in a kneeling position (prone with knees in flexion, and head and knees contacting the floor) and going on the top of ones head. Thereafter, an individual creates force with their palms against the floor while simultaneously moving the elbows into extension. The individual continues to create force until the hands lift off of the ground. The legs move posterior through the air until a standing position is maintained. |
| Kip-up 180 | The difference between a normal kip-up and a kip-up 180 is the rotation added during the phase in which the individual is aerial. The 180 indicates a rotation of 180 degrees before the feet come in contact with the ground. This is a harder variation that works the same way as the kip-up 360. |

=== Hop back variations ===
Hop back variations all involve the practitioner starting in a standing position, possibly jumping in the air and rotating posterior in order to land on their shoulders/back. After maintaining the supine position the practitioner executes the standard kip up variation in order to return to their feet.

| Name | Description |
|---|---|
| Standard hop back to kip-up, or continuous kip-up | The practitioner moves the knees into flexion as if sitting down on an imaginary chair. They then take flight and rotate towards the posterior. The hands are placed posterior and proximal to the back of the neck to protect the cervical spine from receiving damage. Once the body has landed on the shoulders and hands, the hips and knees move into flexion anterior to the chest and a standard kip-up is executed. |
| Rubber band | The rubber band is a breakdancing move which consists of repeated kip-ups which do not go all the way to standing position (the knees never return to complete extension). A rubber band is more like a back handspring, except it requires a movement of slower velocity when lowering the thoracic and cervical spine to the ground to kip back up. |

== Effectiveness in self-defense and combat sports ==
The kip-up maneuver is rarely seen in modern competitive combat sports such as mixed martial arts as the practitioner is exposed and without an effective defensive frame compared to other methods of returning to one's feet (such as a technical stand-up) or engaging in ground fighting. For the same reasons it is usually not recommended for self-defense situations.

Although presented in popular culture as a seemingly fast and agile move, a kip-up is relatively slow against an active opponent, and leaves you defenseless and vulnerable during the action. Attempting to kip-up against an active opponent can lead to being struck hard in the head or being unfavorably grappled, with no way to defend against these attacks.

== In popular culture ==
Frequently performed by the star of action films and in fighting games as a display of resilience and athleticism. Usually the opponents will halt their attack long enough to allow the hero to perform the move cleanly and recover from being downed.

== See also ==
- Kip (artistic gymnastics)
- Kip (trampolining)
