= Maria Kipp =

American textile designer (1900–1988)

- Born: 1900
- Died: 1988 (aged 87–88)
- Education: Staatliche Fachschule für Texitilindustrie
- Known for: Textile designer
- Movement: Maria Kipp Handweaves

Maria Kipp (1900–1988) was a German-born American textile designer and engineer active in the United States from the 1920s until her death. Her commissions ranged from the Salt Lake Temple in Salt Lake City to Air Force One.

== Life ==
Born in Germany, Kipp was the first woman to study at the Staatliche Fachschule für Texitilindustrie (State Academy for the Textile Industry), from where she graduated in 1923 as a textile engineer. In 1924, Kipp and her first husband emigrated to the United States. They settled in Los Angeles where Kipp opened a successful studio, Ernst Haeckel Handweaves, in 1926. She founded Maria Kipp Handweaves in 1931, which specialized in handwoven furnishing fabrics for 60 years. Modernist architects such as Rudolph Schindler and Richard Neutra sought out her designs for their interiors. Neutra used Kipp's designs in his own home, as did other prominent Southern California architects such as Welton Becket, who commissioned her to create interiors for the Bullock's chain of department stores, and Paul Revere Williams, who partnered with her to create interiors for celebrity homes and the Beverly Hills Polo Lounge. Her list of celebrity clients also included Walt Disney and Claudette Colbert.

Although she was lesser known than her contemporaries Anni Albers and Dorothy Liebes, Kipp received an inaugural award for woven fabrics from the American Institute of Decorators in 1948.
