= Know India Programme =

Know India Programme (KIP)
- Country: India
- Prime Minister(s): Narendra Modi
- Ministry: Ministry of External Affairs
- Key people: Vayalar Ravi; Sushma Swaraj
- Launched: 8 January 2014; 11 years ago
- Status: Active
- Website: Official website

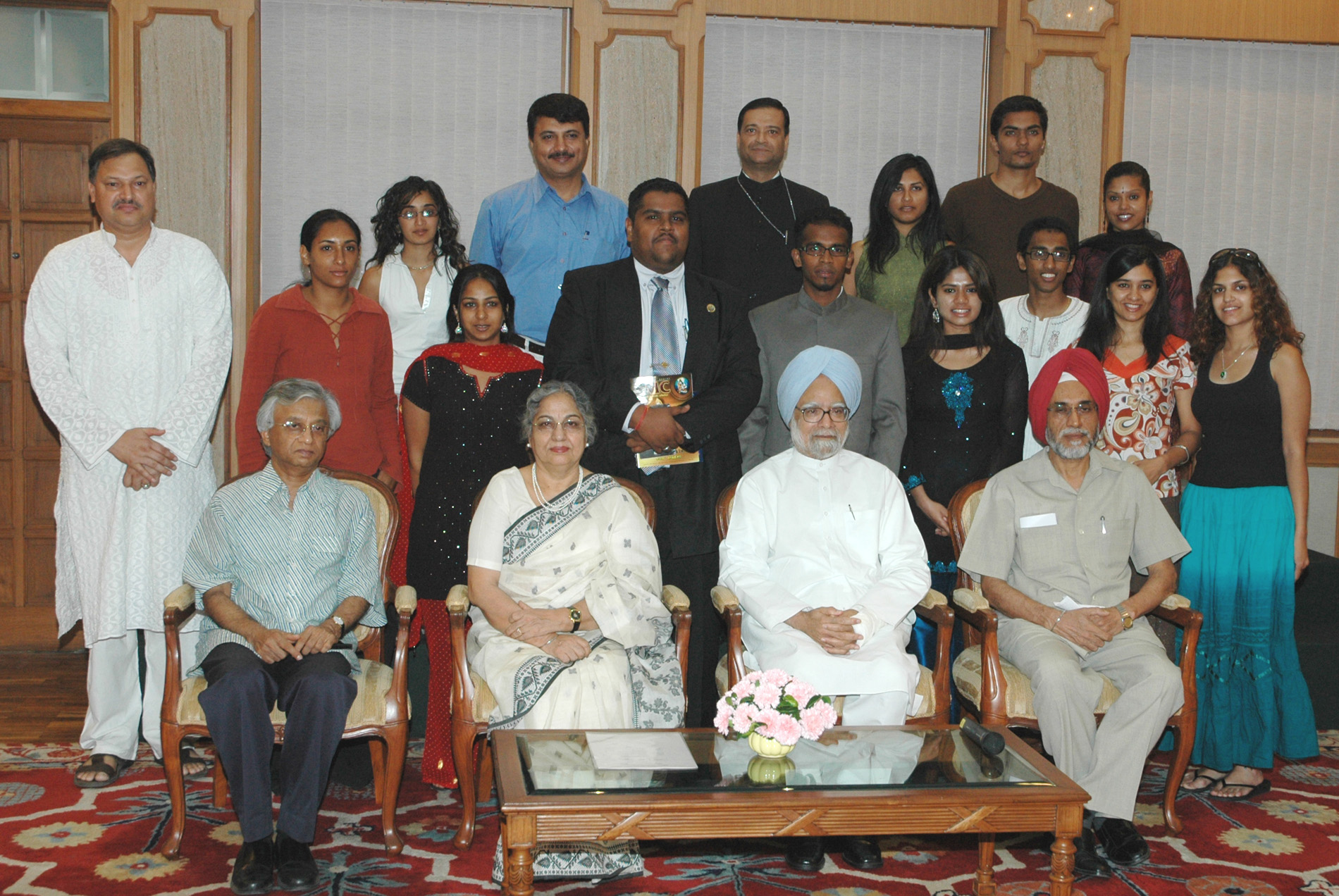
The Fifth "Internship Programme for Diaspora Youth (IPDY) (Know India)", 2006

Know India Programme abbreviated as KIP is a government initiative by the Ministry of External Affairs, Government of India for the Indian diaspora (excluding NRIs) between the age group of 18 to 30 years. It was launched on 8 January 2014, on the occasion of Pravasi Bharatiya Divas in New Delhi. The purpose of the Know India Programme is to help Persons of Indian Origin youths familiarize with their roots and contemporary India and provide them an exposure to the country of their origin. From 2016, six KIPs a year are being organised.

== Overview ==
The substance of the programme broadly includes the following:

(i)Presentations on the country, political process, economy, developments in various sectors like science & technology, information technology, pharmaceuticals, startup ecosystem, digital infrastructure, India stacks, JAM trinity, education, defence, agriculture & tourism.

(ii)Immersion program along with interaction with faculty and students at a prestigious University/College/Institute.

(iii)Presentation on the industrial development and visits to some Industries and exposure to schemes like Skill India, Digital India, Aatmanirbhar Bharat, Make in India, etc.

(iv)Visit to a village to explore different agricultural practices, professions and better understand the typical village life.

(v)Visit to one or two State(s) in India to expose the participants to the cultural diversity of India.

(vi)Interaction with NGOs and government organizations.

(vii)Visit to places of historical importance/monuments and exposure to rich cultural legacy and heritage of India.

(viii)Taking part in cultural programmes and exposure to classical dance forms & music.

(ix)Exposure to vedantic, spiritual, religious & medicinal traditions of India like Yoga, Ayurveda, etc.

(x)Call on high dignitaries, which may include Vice President of India, Union Ministers, Governor or Chief Ministers of Partner State(s).

(xi)Visit to Rashtrapati Bhawan and Parliament.

(xii)Visit to Scientific Institutions of India and familiarization with significant progress achieved by India since independence.
