= Bernd Kipp =

German footballer

Personal information
- Full name: Heinz Bernd Kipp
- Date of birth: 12 August 1948
- Position: Forward

Senior career*
Years	Team	Apps	(Gls)
1971–1972	Eintracht Gelsenkirchen		
1972–1973	Fortuna Düsseldorf		
1973–1976	SC Preußen Münster		

Managerial career
- 1995: SC Preußen Münster
- * Club domestic league appearances and goals

Bernd Kipp (born 12 August 1948) is a retired German football striker.
