= Tom Kipp =

American motorcycle racer (born 1968)

- Nationality: American
- Born: November 17, 1968 (age 58); Willoughby, Ohio, United States
Motorcycle racing career statistics
Superbike World Championship
Active years	1989–1991, 1995, 1997
Manufacturers	Yamaha
Starts / Wins / Podiums / Poles / F. laps / Points; 20 / 1 / 1 / 1 / 0 / 48

Tom Kipp (born November 17, 1968) from Chardon, Ohio is an American former motorcycle racer. A Superbike World Championship race winner, Kipp won the AMA 600 SuperSport Championship in 1992 and the AMA 750 SuperSport Championship in 1994, 1995 and 1999; Kipp, who started motocross racing before he was six years old, also competed in the AMA Superbike Championship, the British Superbike Championship and the AMA Formula Xtreme Championship. He retired in late 2003 to study for Christian ministry, returning to competition for 2005 in the Canadian Superbike Championship. He later became a pastor.
