= Packers Run =

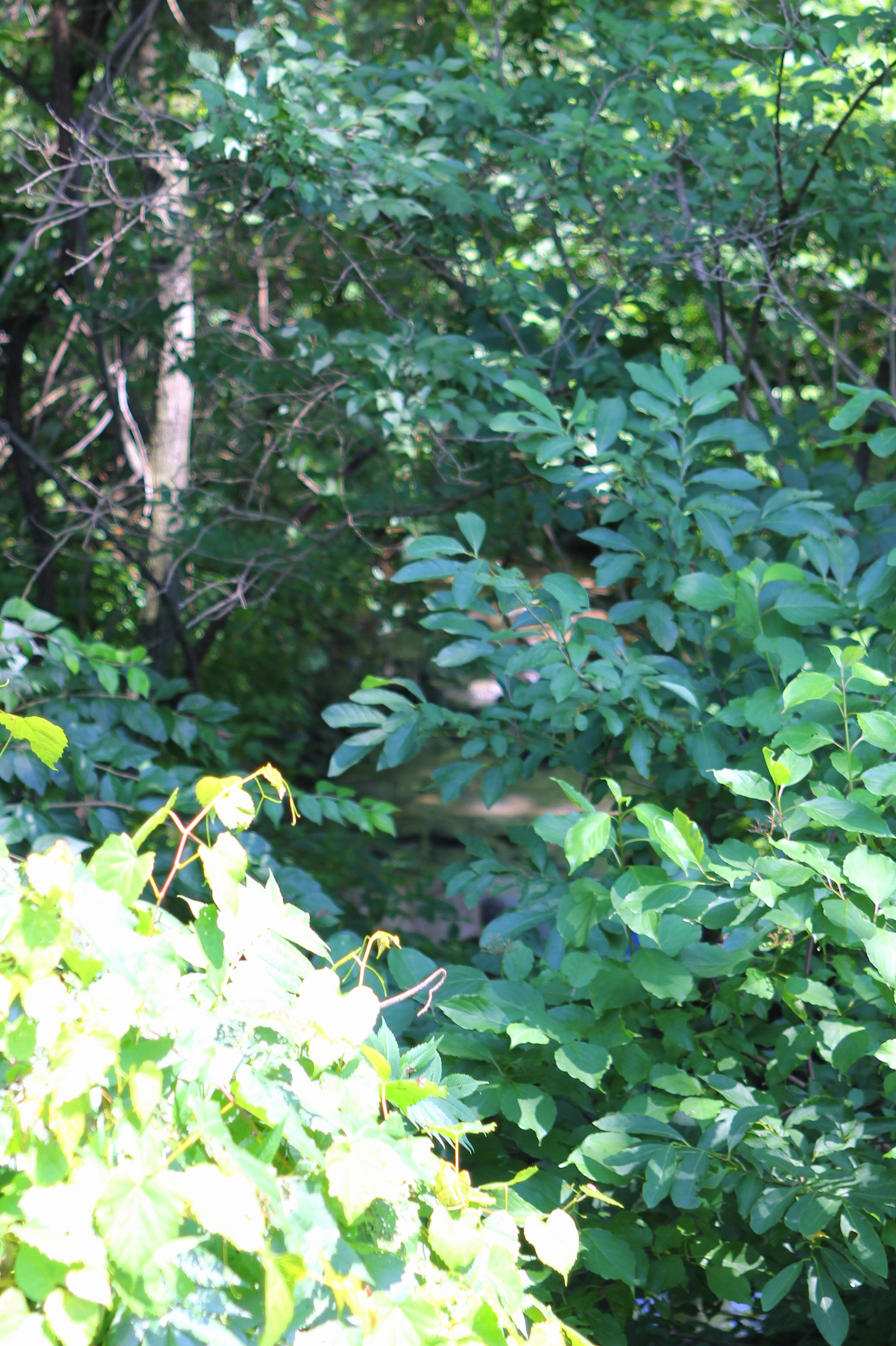
- Packers Run, mostly obscured by vegetation

Physical characteristics
- Source
  - location: Montour Ridge in Point Township, Northumberland County, Pennsylvania
  - elevation: between 840 and 860 feet (260 and 260 m)
- Mouth
  - location: Susquehanna River in Point Township, Northumberland County, Pennsylvania
  - coordinates: 40°55′56″N 76°42′09″W
  - elevation: 420 ft (130 m)
- Length: 2.2 mi (3.5 km)
- Basin size: 4.58 mi^{2} (11.9 km^{2})

Basin features
- Progression: Susquehanna River → Chesapeake Bay

Packers Run is a tributary of the Susquehanna River in Northumberland County, Pennsylvania, in the United States. It is approximately 2.2 miles (3.5 km) long and flows through Point Township. The watershed of the stream has an area of 1.58 square miles (4.1 km^{2}). The stream is designated as a Coldwater Fishery and a Migratory Fishery. There is at least one bridge in its watershed.

== Course ==
Packers Run begins on Montour Ridge in Point Township. It flows west-southwest, passing near the Devils Feather Bed. After a few tenths of a mile, the stream turns southwest and then south, leaving Montour Ridge and entering a plain. Some distance further downstream, it receives an unnamed tributary and turns southwest a short distance later. After several tenths of a mile, the stream crosses US Route 11. A short distance further downstream, it reaches its confluence with the Susquehanna River.

Packers Run joins the Susquehanna River 131.62 miles (211.82 km) upstream of its mouth.

== Geography and watershed ==
The elevation near the mouth of Packers Run is 420 feet (130 m) above sea level. The elevation of the stream's source is between 840 feet (260 m) and 860 feet (260 m) above sea level.

Packers Run is located near the Devils Feather Bed, which is a geographical feature on Montour Ridge.

At least one bridge crosses a tributary of Packers Run. This bridge crosses T-576. A bridge replacement operation was planned for the bridge in 1989, with an estimated total cost of $425,000.

The watershed of Packers Run has an area of 1.58 square miles (4.1 km^{2}). The stream is in the United States Geological Survey quadrangle of Riverside.

== History ==
According to staff from the Pennsylvania Fish and Boat Commission, Packers Run was inadvertently left out of the Chapter 93.9 Drainage List, along with several other streams in its vicinity. This error was proposed for correction of February 25, 2013. However, the streams were not added to the list and were instead listed as "tributaries to the Susquehanna River". They remain listed as such as of 2013.

Packers Run was entered into the Geographic Names Information System on August 2, 1979. Its identifier in the Geographic Names Information System is 1183176.

== Biology ==
Packer Run is designated as a Coldwater Fishery and a Migratory Fishery. All of the tributaries of the Susquehanna River between the West Branch Susquehanna River and Mahoning Creek also have these designations.

== See also ==
- Raups Run, next tributary of the Susquehanna River going upriver
- List of rivers of Pennsylvania
