= Kip (artistic gymnastics) =

Gymnastic technique

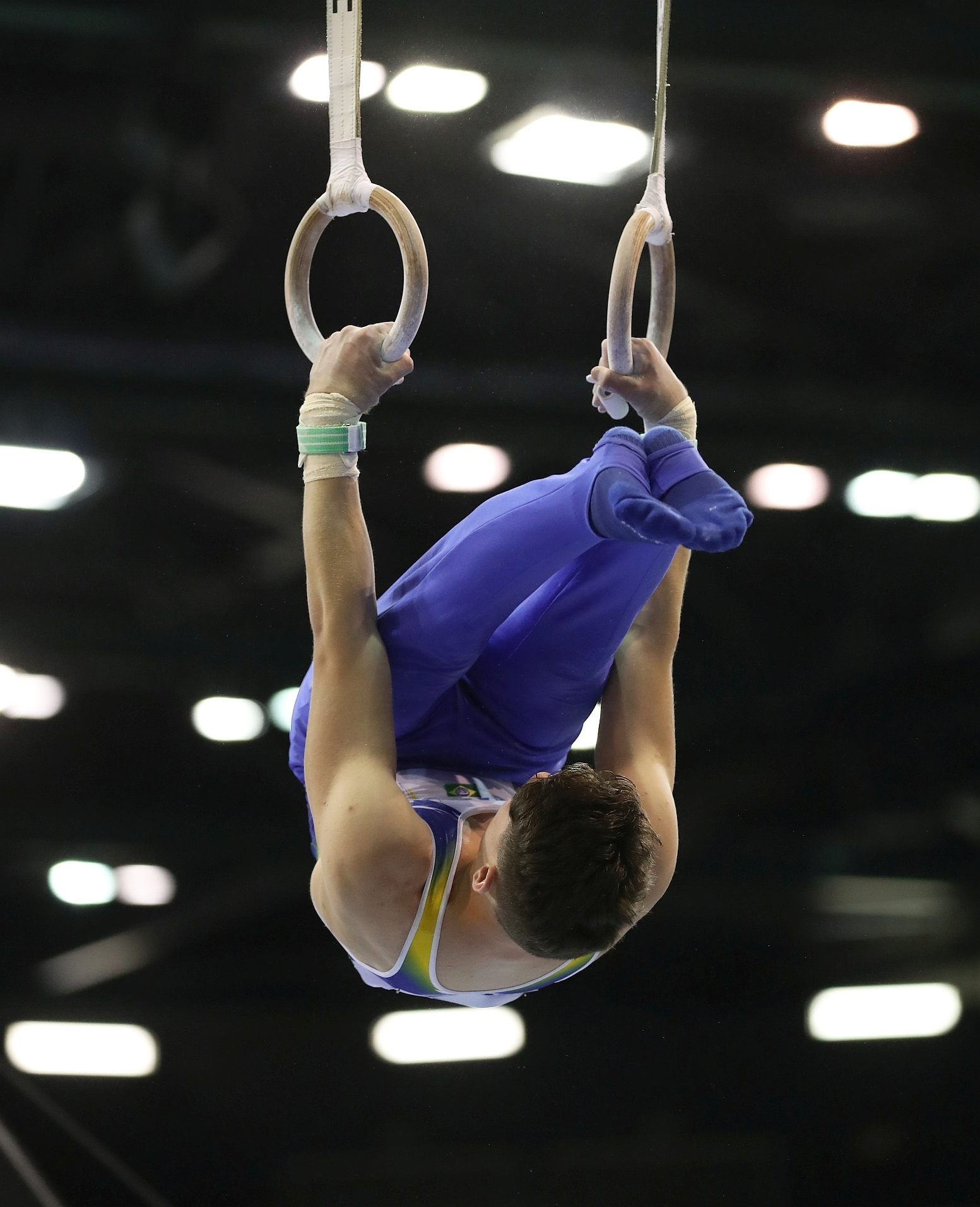
Diogo Soares performing a back kip on rings

In artistic gymnastics, a kip is a technique that involves flexing or piking at the hips, and then rapidly extending the hip joints to impart momentum. It may be performed in some form on all apparatuses, but is most commonly performed on the women's uneven bars and on the men's rings, parallel bars, and horizontal bar.

The kip is an important technique that is used as both a mount and an element or connecting technique in a bar routine. The kip allows the gymnast to swing below the bar to arrive in a front support on the bar. From the front support, the gymnast may then perform any number of skills. The glide kip is the most commonly used mount on the women's uneven bars.

== Variations ==
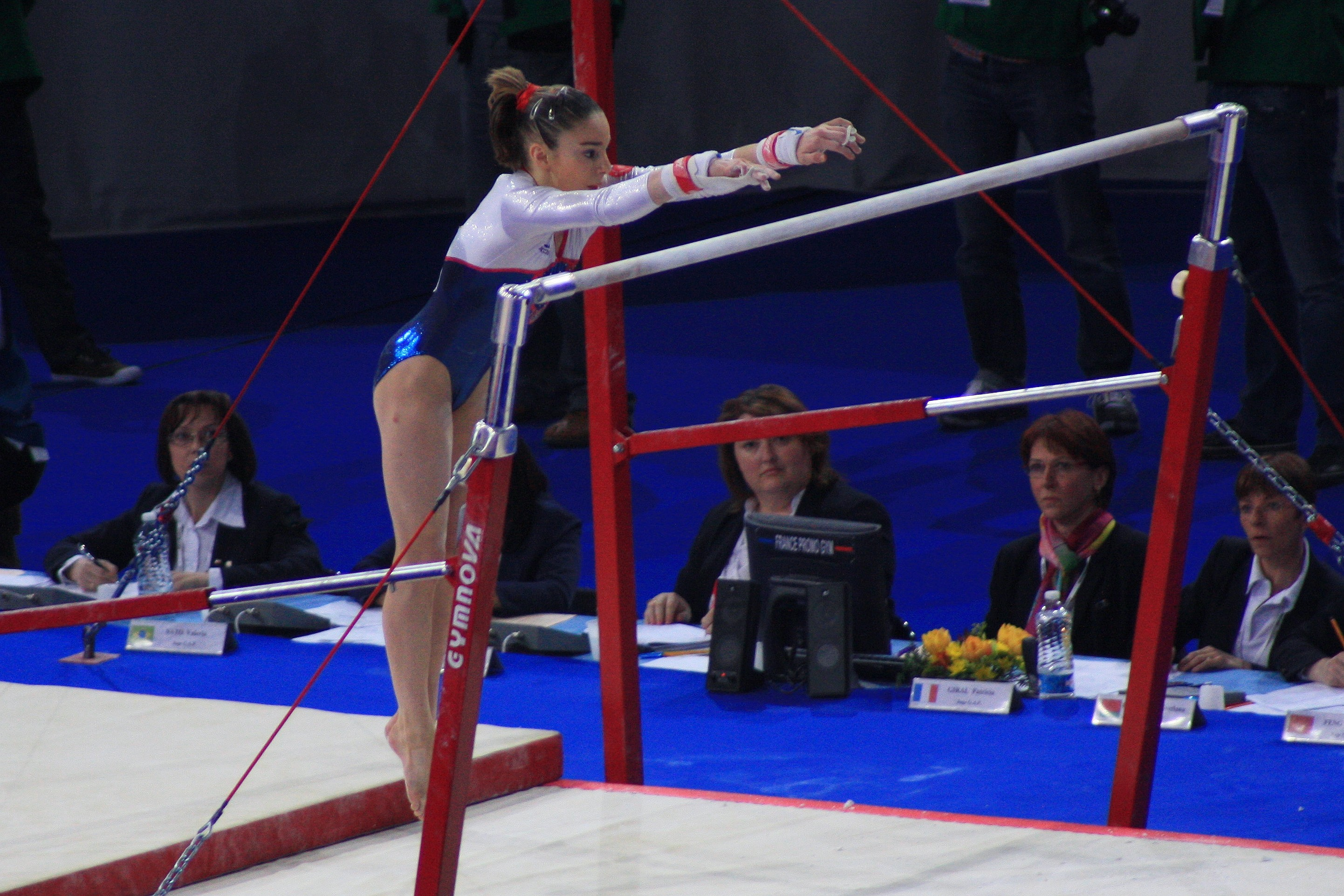
Youna Dufournet performing a Glide Kip on bars

Variations of the kip include the long hang kip, glide kip, drop kip, kip with stoop through and kip with jump turn.

- The glide kip may be used as a mount or a connecting skill. The glide kip is performed by swinging in a piked hollow position, toes in front, under the bar to extend to a straight hollow position parallel to the floor. Once extended, the gymnast quickly pulls his or her feet towards the bar while simultaneously pushing down with straight arms to arrive in a straight hollow front support on the bar. Taller gymnasts may perform the glide kip in a straddle hollow rather than piked hollow swing, joining the feet together at extension, before initiating the kipping action.
- The long hang kip utilizes the gymnast's ability to swing on the high bar to perform a kip. Unlike a glide kip, the long hang kip does not swing in a piked hollow position nor does it swing all the way out to horizontal. A long hang kip begins with a straight hollow swing under the bar and performs the kipping action (the pulling of the feet to the bar while pushing with the arms) much earlier in the swing than does a glide kip.
- The drop kip is a kip often used in gymnastics conditioning, both to strengthen the muscles of those who already are able to perform a kip as well as to help new students learn a kip. This kip utilizes little swing, rather, it requires a great deal of strength on the part of the gymnast. The gymnast begins in a front support on the bar, thighs on the bar, chest in hollow. He or she then drops backwards with straight arms, "sliding" the bar down their legs to their feet. Their shins or feet must stay close to the bar. After completing their small swing backwards, they begin the kipping action by pushing down with straight arms to arrive again in a hollow front support on the bar.
- The glide kip with stoop through is performed by executing a glide kip, but bringing the feet and straight legs between the bar and the arms to finish sitting on top of the bar. The gymnast typically will then use the propulsion of the kip to push off the low bar and catch the high bar. This skill may also be performed by straddling the legs over the bar rather than piking between the hands.
- The jump with 1/2 turn to kip and jump with 1/1 turn to kip is a kip performed with a jump half or jump full turn prior to catching the bar. When a jump half turn is performed, the gymnast does not swing but immediately kips from the air. When a jump full turn is performed, the gymnast completes the swing as usual before kipping. This skill may be performed on the low or the high bar.

== See also ==
- Uneven Bars
- Kip-up (martial arts)
