= Kip (given name) =

Kip is a given name. Notable people and characters with the name include:

== People ==
- Kip Carpenter (born 1979), American speed skater
- Kip Corrington (born 1965), American collegiate football and National Football League player
- Kip Diggs (born 1966), American politician and retired professional boxer
- Kip Gamblin (born 1975), Australian ballet dancer and actor
- Kip Gross (born 1964), former Major League Baseball and Nippon Professional Baseball pitcher
- Kip Hanrahan (born 1954), American jazz music impresario, record producer and percussionist
- Kip Janvrin (born 1965), American former decathlete
- Kip Lewis (born 2004), American football player
- Kip Kinkel (born 1982), American teenage spree killer
- Kip Miller (born 1969), American National Hockey League player
- Kip Moore (born 1980), American country music singer/songwriter
- Kip Thorne (born 1940), American theoretical physicist
- Kip Tokuda (1946–2013), American social worker and politician
- Kip Williams (born 1987), Australian director and Artistic Director of Sydney Theatre Company
- Kip Winger (born 1961), American musician
- Kip Young (born 1954), American former Major League Baseball pitcher

== Fictional characters ==
- Kip Half-Sack Epps, on the FX television series Sons of Anarchy
- Kipland "Kip" Ronald Dynamite, from the 2004 movie Napoleon Dynamite
- Kip Supernova, from the animated film Escape from Planet Earth
- Kip "Buffy" Wilson, from the TV show Bosom Buddies
- Kip, from the children's television series Higglytown Heroes
- Kip O'Donnell, a poacher and villain in The Wild Thornberries
- Kip O'Drordy, a lonesome and outcast kid in South Park
- Kip, a Fastball in The Warriors
- Christopher "Kip" Grady, from Heated Rivalry
- Kip Silverpoint, in OneShot
