= Kip (trampolining) =

In trampolining, a kip is a skill in which a supporter adds or removes lift to the performer's bounce by pressing on the trampoline bed to apply weight just before or after the performer makes contact with the bed. The term kipping is sometimes used only for the technique that adds additional height by applying weight before the performer lands and removing the weight when the performer has depressed the bed, with the term killing used to distinguish the technique that applies pressure after the performer lands to lessen the bounce.

A kip is mostly used by coaches while helping performers develop new skills. In such circumstances, an experienced coach will either stand, or bounce, alongside the performer and by timing their actions in the bed, they will be able to either increase, decrease, or simply stabilize the level of bounce experienced by the performer.

== Technique ==
The kip action itself occurs while the coach is in contact with the trampoline bed; they will bend their knees and then depress the bed downwards either:

- just before or in time with the performer's landing and then timing the adjustment or removal of the weight after the bed depresses in order to create a higher rebound in accordance with the performer's needs; or
- fractionally after the performer's landing and remaining in contact with the bed to absorb the trampoline's recoil power in order to 'kill' the bed slightly thereby reducing the height of the performer's rebound.
