= Rush Township, Northumberland County, Pennsylvania =

Township in Pennsylvania, US

Coordinates: 40°55′00″N 76°34′59″W

- Township
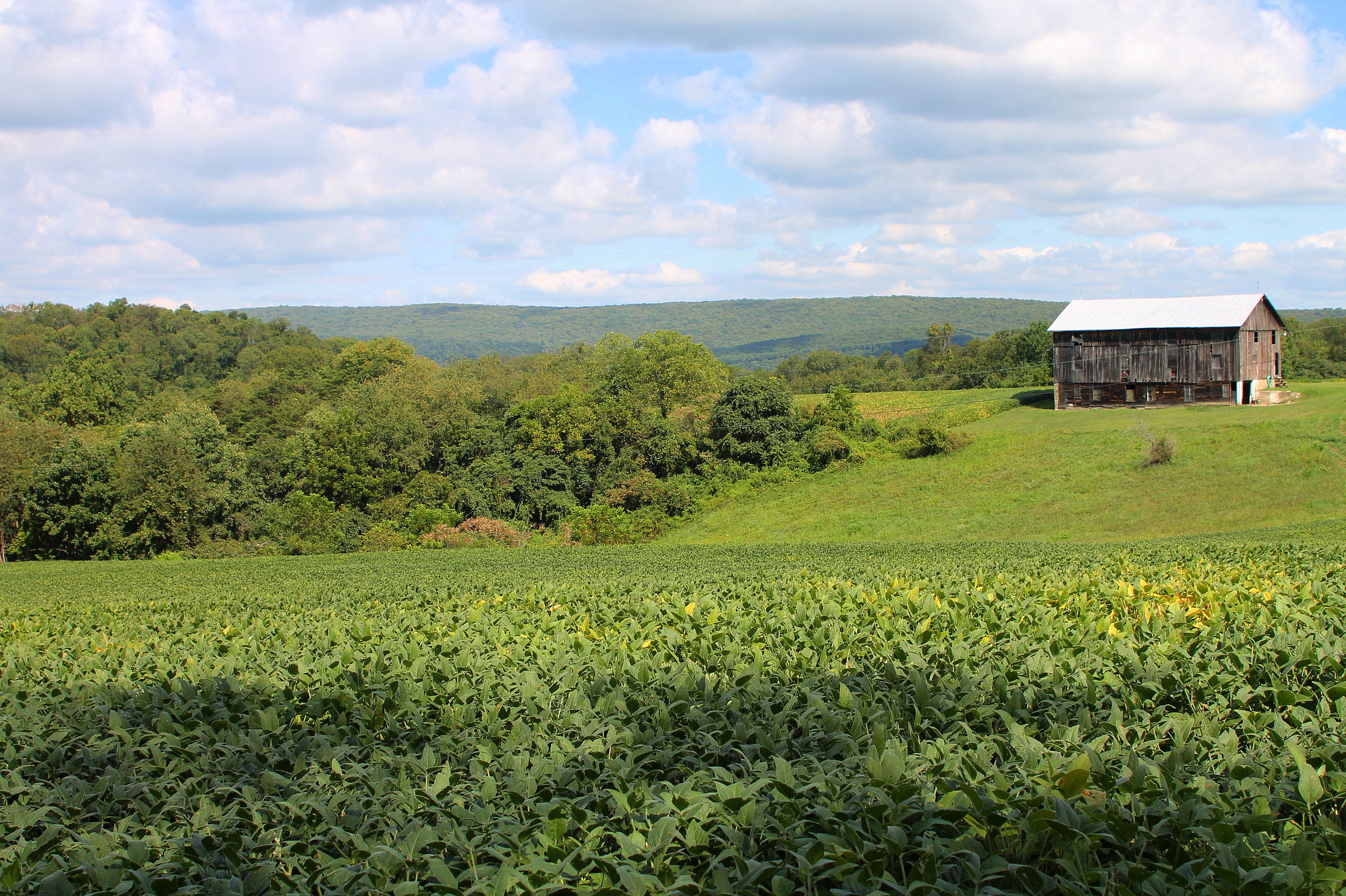
- Scenery in Rush Township

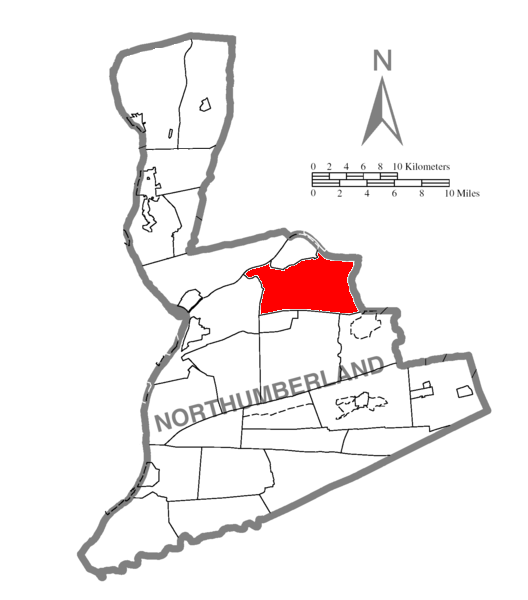
- Map of Northumberland County, Pennsylvania highlighting Rush Township

- Map of Northumberland County, Pennsylvania
- Country: United States
- State: Pennsylvania
- County: Northumberland
- Settled: 1784
- Incorporated: 1819

Government
  - Type: Board of Supervisors

Area
  - Total: 27.27 sq mi (70.64 km^{2})
  - Land: 26.64 sq mi (69.01 km^{2})
  - Water: 0.63 sq mi (1.62 km^{2})

Population (2010)
  - Total: 1,122
  - Estimate (2016): 1,110
  - Density: 41.6/sq mi (16.08/km^{2})
- Time zone: UTC-5 (Eastern (EST))
  - Summer (DST): UTC-4 (EDT)
- Area code: 570
- FIPS code: 42-097-66752

Rush Township is a township that is located in Northumberland County, Pennsylvania, United States. The population at the time of the 2010 Census was 1,122, a decline from the figure of 1,189 that was tabulated in 2000.

== Geography ==
According to the United States Census Bureau, the township has a total area of 27.4 square miles (70.9 km^{2}), of which 26.8 square miles (69.3 km^{2}) is land and 0.6 square mile (1.6 km^{2}) (2.23%) is water.

== Demographics ==
Historical population
Census	Pop.	Note	%±
2010	1,122		—
2016 (est.)	1,110		−1.1%
U.S. Decennial Census

As of the census of 2000, there were 1,189 people, 443 households, and 330 families residing in the township.

The population density was 44.4 inhabitants per square mile (17.1/km^{2}). There were 469 housing units at an average density of 17.5/sq mi (6.8/km^{2}).

The racial makeup of the township was 98.23% White, 0.25% African American, 0.67% Asian, 0.08% Pacific Islander, 0.17% from other races, and 0.59% from two or more races. Hispanic or Latino of any race were 0.25% of the population.

There were 443 households, out of which 30.2% had children who were under the age of eighteen living with them, 66.8% were married couples living together, 5.0% had a female householder with no husband present, and 25.5% were non-families. 22.1% of all households were made up of individuals, and 10.8% had someone living alone who was sixty-five years of age or older. The average household size was 2.68 and the average family size was 3.16.

Within the township, the population was spread out, with 26.4% of residents who were under the age of eighteen, 6.3% who were aged eighteen to twenty-four, 25.1% who were aged twenty-five to forty-four, 27.7% who were aged forty-five to sixty-five, and 14.5% who were sixty-five years of age or older. The median age was forty years.

For every one hundred females, there were 98.8 males. For every one hundred females who were aged eighteen or older, there were 101.6 males.

The median income for a household in the township was $43,098, and the median income for a family was $48,542. Males had a median income of $30,074 compared with that of $23,077 for females.

The per capita income for the township was $21,055.

Approximately 2.2% of families and 5.1% of the population were living below the poverty line, including 7.9% of those who were under the age of eighteen and 3.1% of those who were aged sixty-five or older.

== Gallery ==
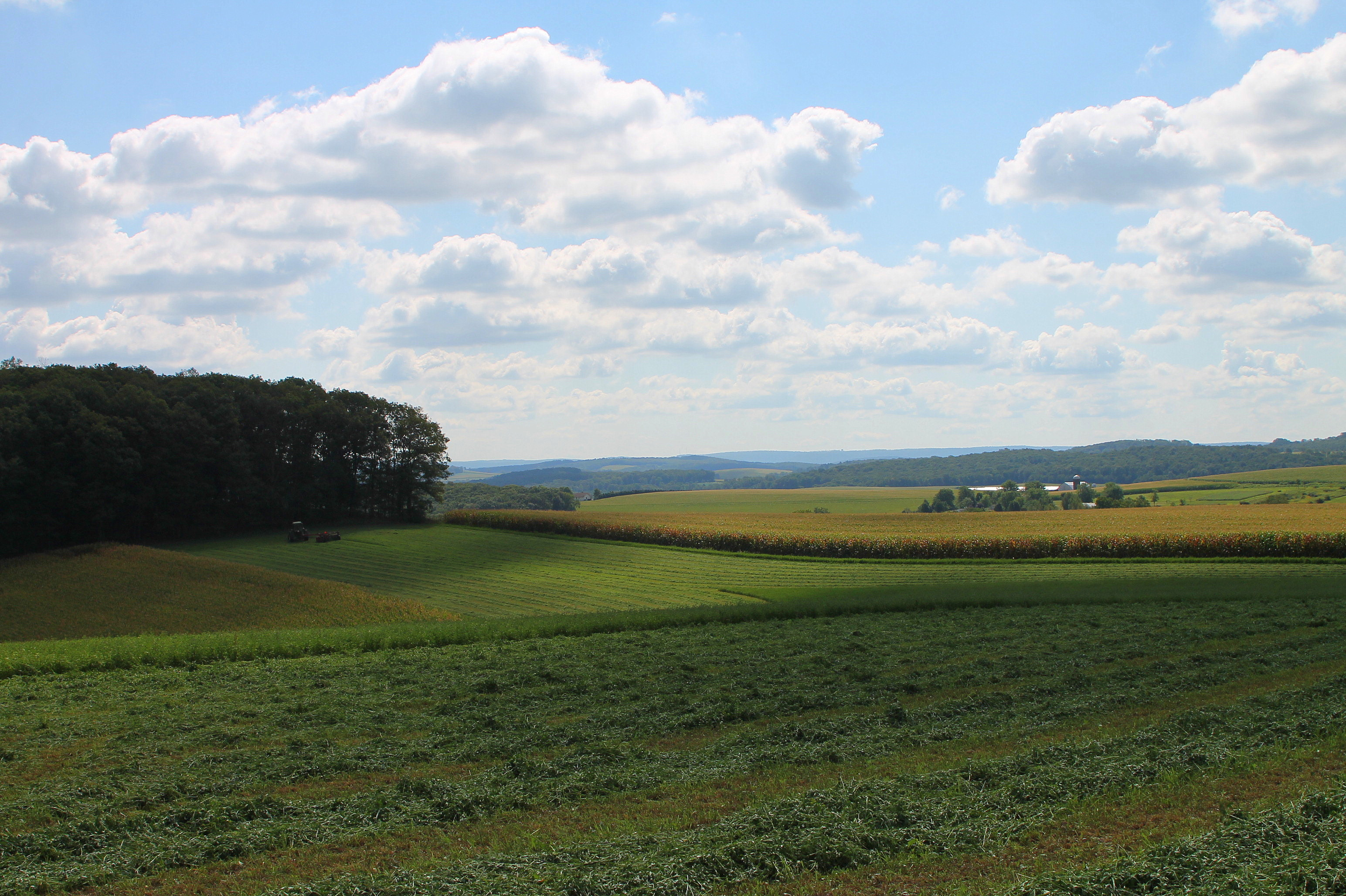
Scenery of Rush Township

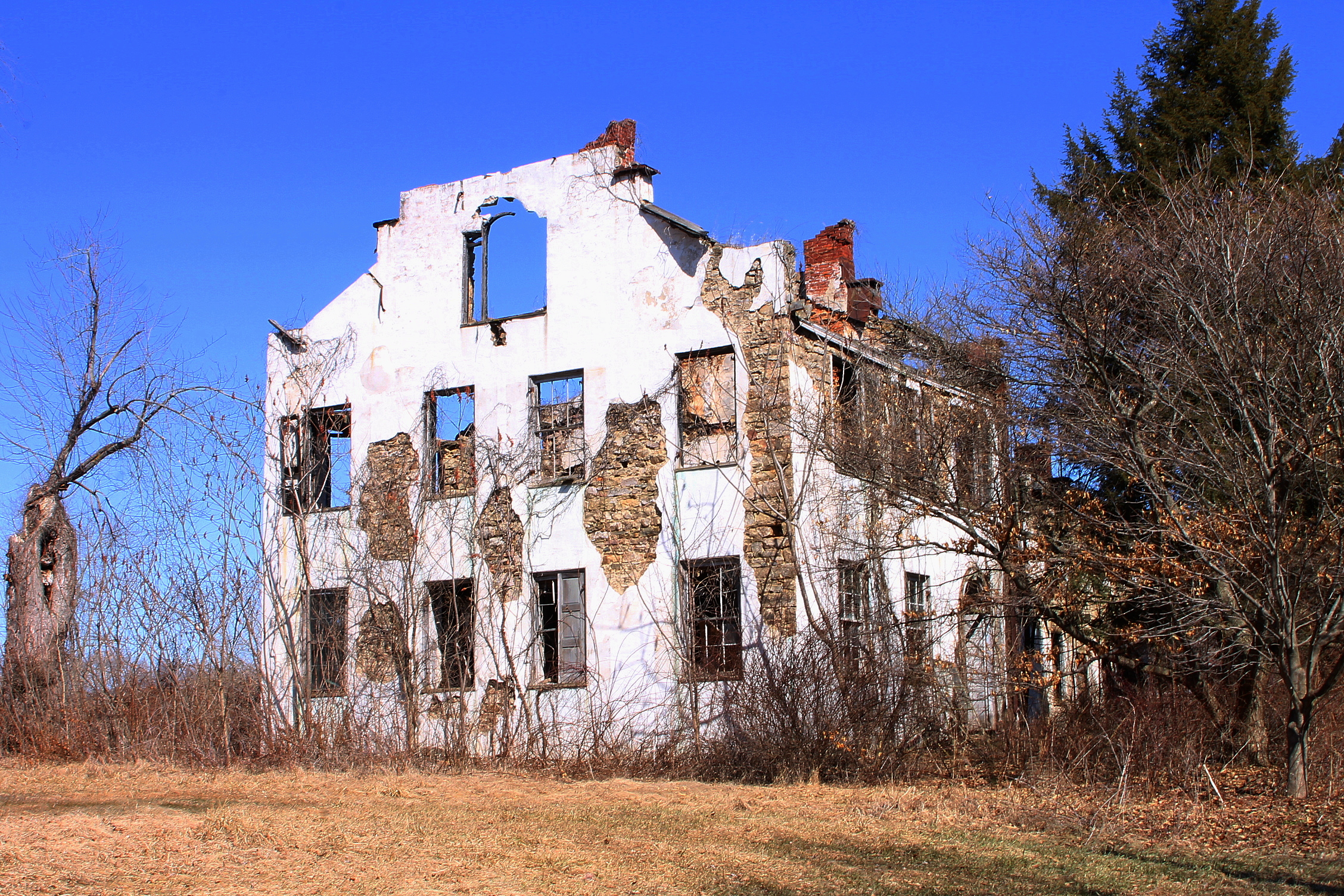
Rundown house in Rush Township
