= Mauses Creek =

Tributary of Mahoning Creek in Pennsylvania

Coordinates: 40°59′00″N 76°37′44″W

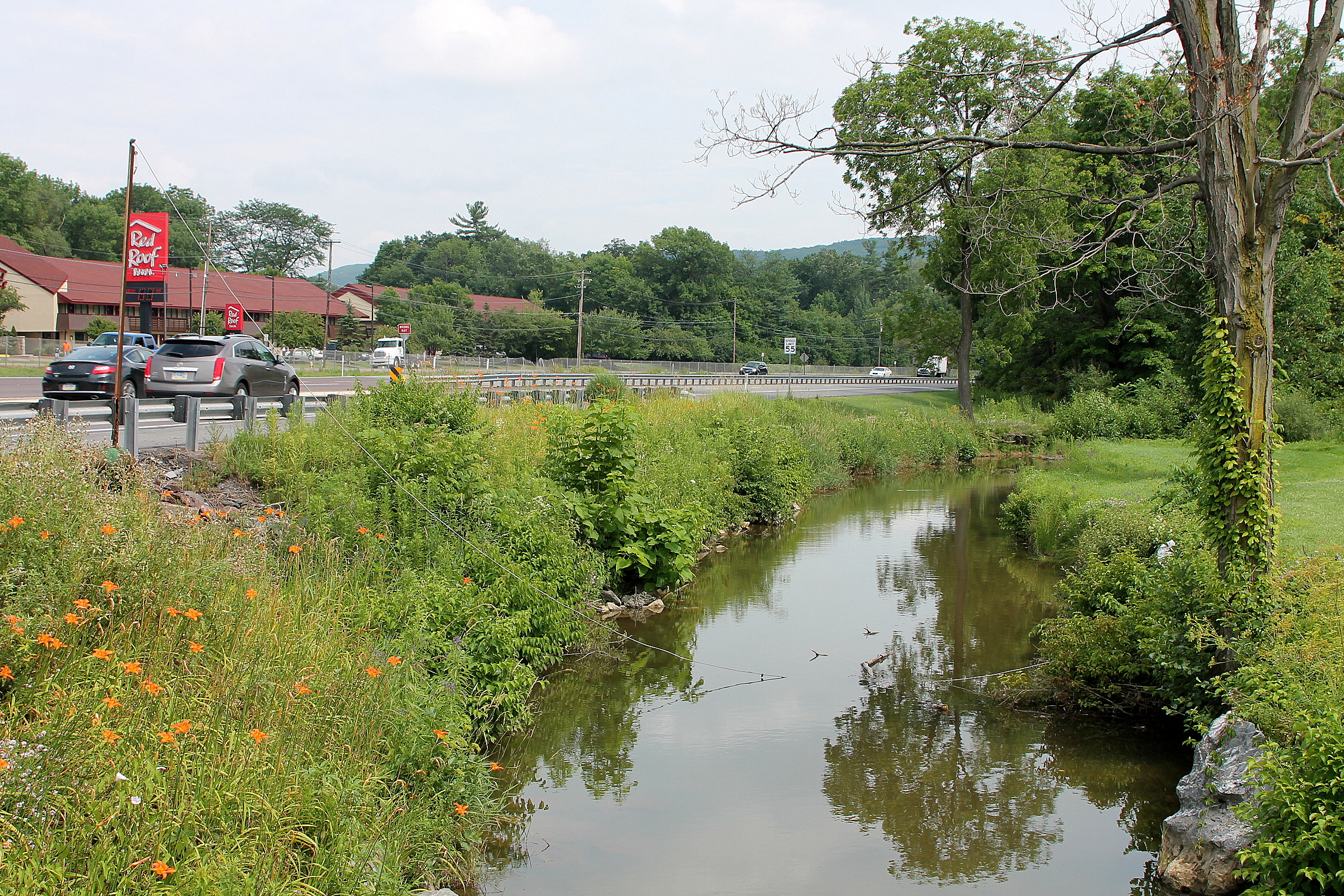
- Mauses Creek looking downstream near Interstate 80

Physical characteristics
- Source
  - location: Liberty Township, Montour County, Pennsylvania
- Mouth
  - location: Mahoning Creek in Valley Township, Montour County, Pennsylvania
  - elevation: 482 ft (147 m)
- Length: 5.9 mi (9.5 km)
- Basin size: 11.40 mi^{2} (29.5 km^{2})

Basin features
- Tributaries
  - left: Indian Creek

Mauses Creek is a tributary of Mahoning Creek in Montour County, Pennsylvania, in the United States. It is approximately 5.9 miles (9.5 km) long and flows through Liberty Township and Valley Township. Indian Creek is its only named tributary. The watershed of Mauses Creek has an area of 11.40 square miles (29.5 km^{2}). The main rock formations in the watershed are the Bloomsburg and Mifflintown Formation, the Wills Creek Formation, the Hamilton Group, and the Trimmers Rock Formation. Soil series in the watershed include the Berks-Weikert-Bedington series and the Clymer-Buchannnon-Norwich series.

Mauses Creek experiences siltation, organic enrichment, and low levels of dissolved oxygen. It is also contaminated by some organic compounds. The creek is crossed by six bridges.

In his book Trout Unlimited's Guide to Pennsylvania Limestone Streams, A. Joseph Armstrong describes Mauses Creek as "very similar to the upper portions of Kase and Sechler runs". It is inhabited by trout and chubs, as well as several other fish species.

== Course ==
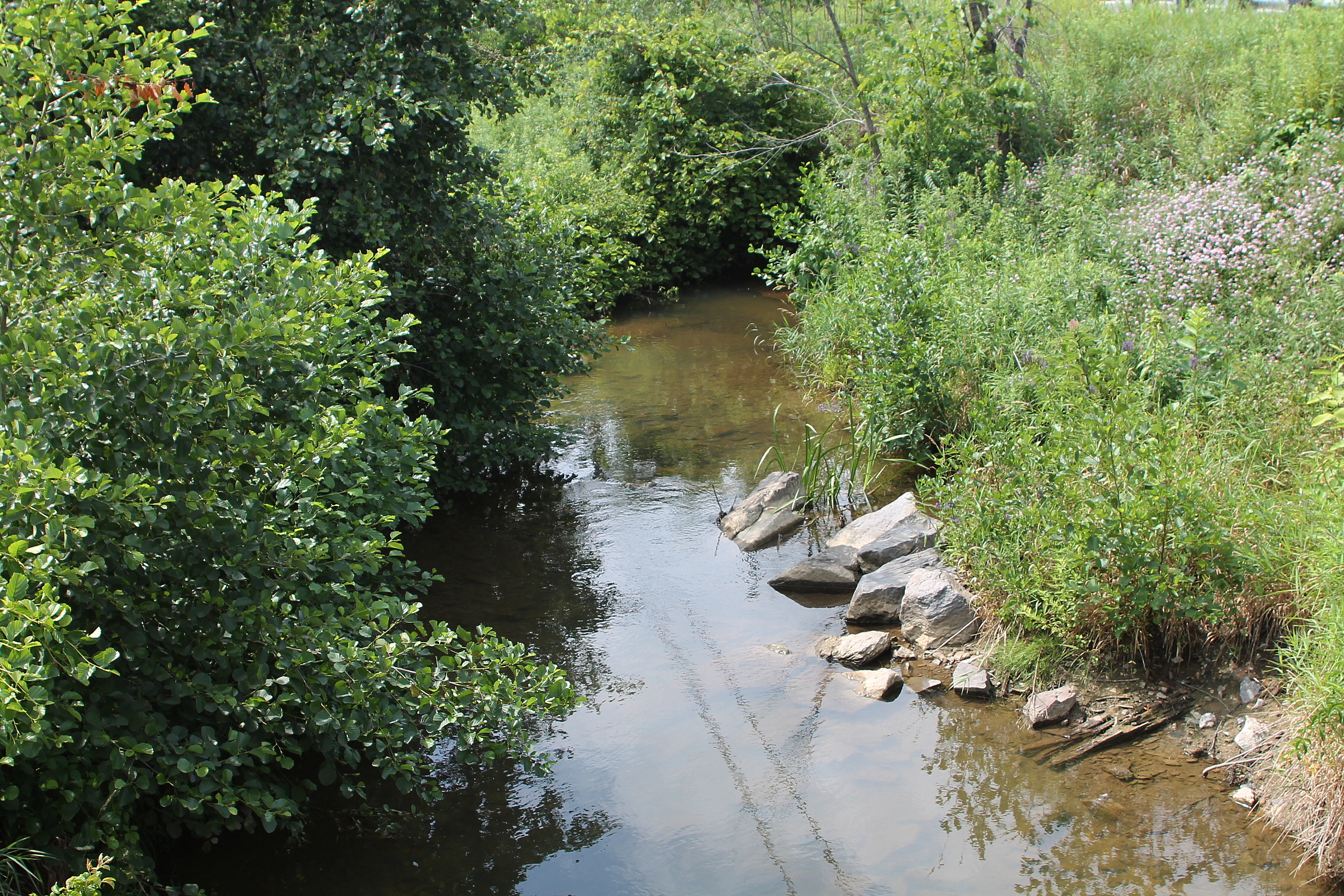
Mauses Creek looking upstream near Interstate 80

Mauses Creek begins in Liberty Township, near Mooresburg. It flows south for some distance before turning northeast, running parallel to railroad tracks for some distance before crossing Pennsylvania Route 642 and making an abrupt turn east. A short distance later, the creek exits Liberty Township. Upon leaving Liberty Township, the creek enters Valley Township. It continues east for a few miles, flowing parallel to Pennsylvania Route 642. The creek then turns northeast, away from the state route and it picks up the tributary Indian Creek after a short distance. It then turns southeast, flowing parallel to Pennsylvania Route 54. After some distance it crosses Pennsylvania Route 642 and passes the community of Mausdale. The creek reaches its confluence with Mahoning Creek in the southern edge of Valley Township.

Mauses Creek joins Mahoning Creek 3.00 miles (4.83 km) upstream of its mouth.

=== Tributaries ===
The only named tributary of Mauses Creek is Indian Creek. It mainly flows in a north-south direction and joins Mauses Creek 1.20 miles (1.93 km) upstream of its mouth. Indian Creek's watershed has an area of 1.92 square miles (5.0 km^{2}).

== Hydrology ==
Most of Mauses Creek is considered by the Pennsylvania Department of Environmental Protection to be impaired. A few of its tributaries are also considered to be impaired, although most of them are not.

Mauses Creek experiences siltation and organic enrichment. It also has low levels of dissolved oxygen.

Chemicals such as trichloroethylene and 1,2-dichloroethene contaminate Mauses Creek in its lower reaches, near the MW Manufacturing Company site, 0.5 miles (0.80 km) from the creek's mouth. These chemicals are not present further upstream.

The ten-year seven-day average minimum discharge of Mauses Creek is 63 gallons per minute.

== Geography and geology ==
The lower reaches of Mauses Creek lie over rock of the Bloomsburg and Mifflintown Formation and the Wills Creek Formation, as do the creek's southern tributaries. Most of the rest of the creek is on rock of the Keyser and Tonoloway Formation. The creek's northern tributaries are over rock of the Hamilton Group and the Trimmers Rock Formation. The creek is not influenced by limestone.

Nearly all of the soil in the watershed of Mauses Creek is of the Berks-Weikert-Bedington soil series. However, the mouth of the creek and the upper reaches of some of its southernmost tributaries are over soil of the Clymer-Buchannnon-Norwich series.

Mauses Creek is between 10 feet (3.0 m) and 15 feet (4.6 m) wide. The elevation of the creek near its mouth is 482 inches (1,220 cm) above sea level.

== Watershed ==
The watershed of Mahoning Creek has an area of 11.40 square miles (29.5 km^{2}). There is a strip of developed land in the creek. The area of developed land is mostly surrounded by agricultural land. There are areas of forested land in the watershed, but they are further away from the creek itself. A marshy area is located near the creek in its lower reaches.

Mauses Creek is close to Danville. The creek is in the Riverside United States Geological Survey Topographical Quadrangle.

== History ==
Six surviving bridges have been built over Mauses Creek. One was built in 1915, two were built in 1963, one was built in 1975, and one was built in 1985.

A site known as the MW Manufacturing Company released pollution into Mauses Creek in the 20th century.

== Biology ==
Although Mauses Creek is stocked, there are few trout in it. The creek does, however, have a large population of chubs. Additionally, darters, dace, minnows, and bass inhabit the creek. The waters of the creek are approved trout waters. Locals commonly fish there.

Mauses Creek is designated as a warmwater fishery and a migratory fishery.

There are no known endangered or threatened species in Mauses Creek.

Contamination from the MW Manufacturing Company site on Mauses Creek has a slightly adverse effect on the creek near the site, but no effect further downstream.

== See also ==
- List of rivers of Pennsylvania
- Sechler Run
