= Mahoning Creek (Susquehanna River tributary) =

Tributary in Susquehanna River

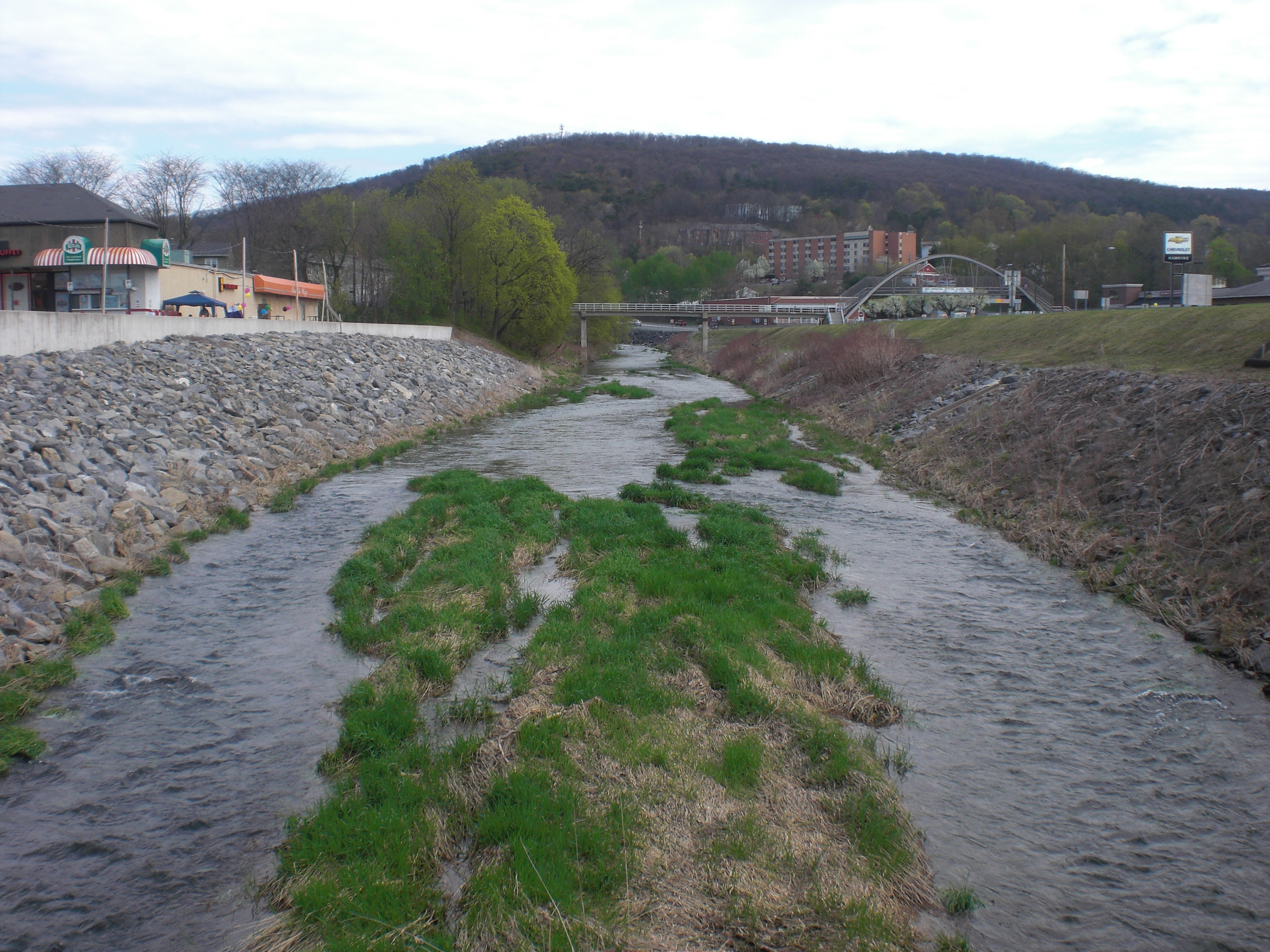
- Mahoning Creek

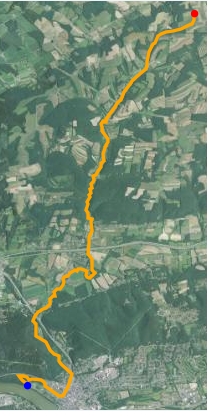
- Satellite map of Mahoning Creek. The red dot is the stream's source and blue dot is its mouth.

Physical characteristics
- Source
  - location: valley in Madison Township, Columbia County, Pennsylvania
  - elevation: between 1,080 and 1,100 feet (330 and 340 m)
- Mouth
  - location: Susquehanna River in Danville, Montour County, Pennsylvania
  - coordinates: 40°57′54″N 76°37′54″W
  - elevation: 463 ft (141 m)
- Length: 10.6 mi (17.1 km)
- Basin size: 39.6 sq mi (103 km^{2})

Basin features
- Progression: Susquehanna River → Chesapeake Bay
- Tributaries
  - left: Sechler Run, Kase Run
  - right: Mauses Creek

Mahoning Creek is a tributary of the Susquehanna River in Columbia County and Montour County, in Pennsylvania, in the United States. It is approximately 10.6 miles (17.1 km) long and flows through Madison Township in Columbia County and West Hemlock Township, Derry Township, Valley Township, Mahoning Township, and Danville in Montour County. The watershed of the creek has an area of 39.6 square miles (103 km^{2}). Its tributaries include Kase Run, Mauses Creek, and Sechler Run. Mahoning Creek is designated as a Trout-Stocking Fishery and a Migratory Fishery for part of its length and as a Warmwater Fishery and a Migratory Fishery for the remainder.

Mahoning Creek is considered by the Pennsylvania Department of Environmental Protection to be impaired by siltation. The main rock formations in the watershed include the Trimmers Rock Formation, the Clinton Group, the Catskill Formation, the Hamilton Group, the Bloomsburg and Mifflintown Formation, the Onondaga and Old Port Formation, and the Wills Creek Formation. The main soils include the Berks-Weikert-Alvira series, the Chenango-Pope-Holly series, the Clymer-Buchanan-Norwich series, and the Leck Kill-Meckesville-Calvin series. Most of the watershed is forested or agricultural land, but there is some developed land.

There was historically a village of the Delaware tribe near the mouth of Mahoning Creek. The first people of European descent arrived in the area in the 1760s and 1770s. Various mills were constructed on it in the 1700s and 1800s. Numerous bridges have also been constructed across the creek. Part of the creek is in the Montour Ridge Landscape Corridor.

== Course ==
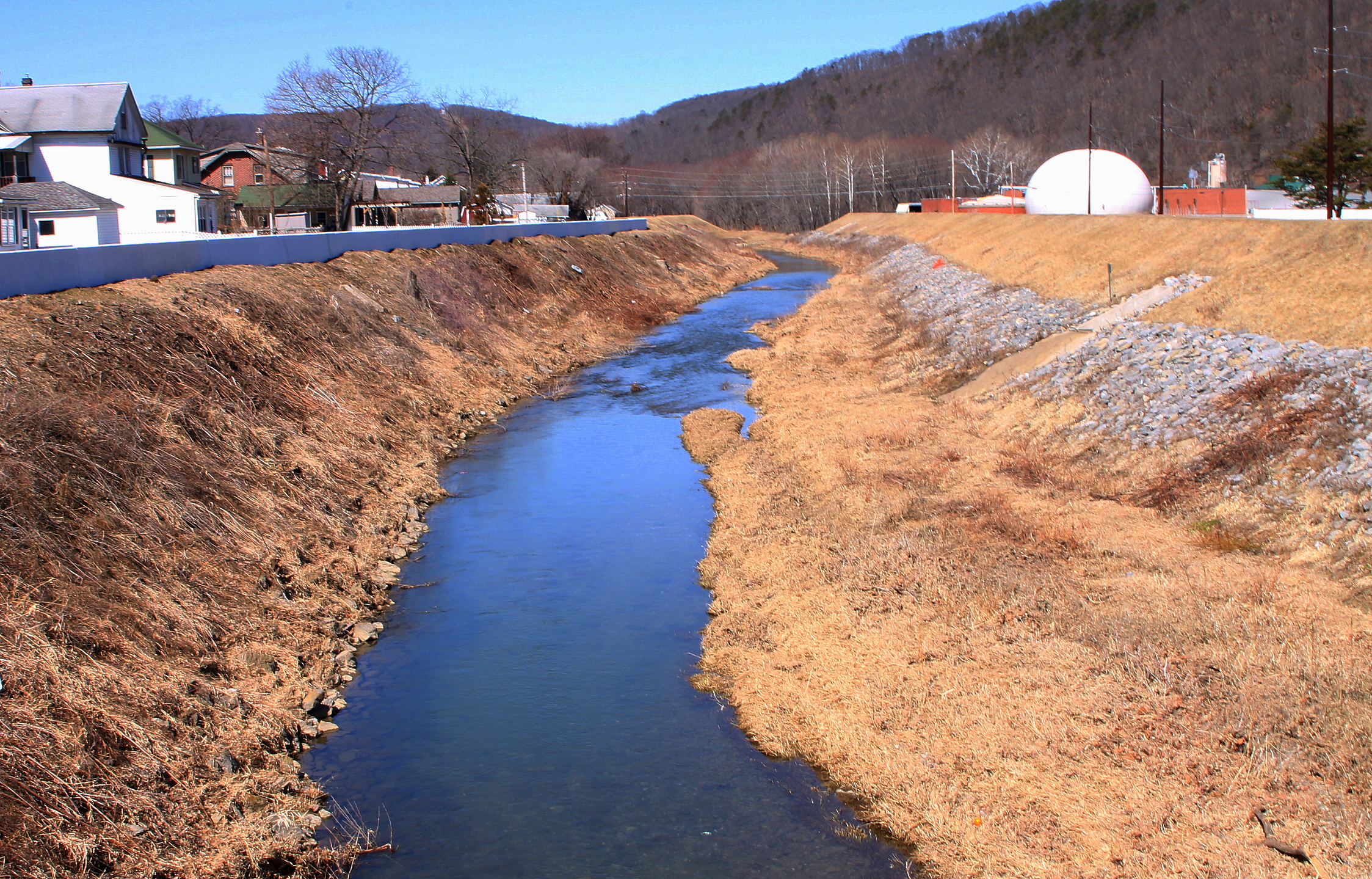
Mahoning Creek near West Mahoning Street in Danville

Mahoning Creek begins in a valley in Madison Township, Columbia County. It flows south for a short distance before turning west-southwest for several tenths of a mile, exiting Columbia County.

Upon exiting Columbia County, Mahoning Creek enters West Hemlock Township, Montour County. It flows south-southwest alongside Pennsylvania Route 642 for a few miles before crossing Pennsylvania Route 642 and entering Derry Township. The creek then turns south for a few miles and enters Valley Township. In Valley Township, it continues flowing south in its valley and crosses Pennsylvania Route 642 before continuing south. The creek eventually enters a much broader valley and flows away from Pennsylvania Route 642. After several tenths of a mile, it crosses Interstate 80 and receives Kase Run, its first named tributary, from the left. The creek then meanders west for several tenths of a mile and then turns southwest, flowing alongside Pennsylvania Route 642 again. Not far from Mausdale, Mahoning Creek crosses Pennsylvania Route 642 and Pennsylvania Route 54 and receives the tributary Mauses Creek from the right. The creek then turns southeast and begins flowing alongside Pennsylvania Route 54 into Mahoning Township and through a water gap in Montour Ridge. It enters Danville and leaves behind the water gap, turning south-southwest and crossing US Route 11. After a few tenths of a mile, the creek receives Sechler Run, its last named tributary, from the left, and turns west-northwest. After several tenths of a mile, it exits Danville and enters Mahoning Township briefly before turning sharply southeast and reentering Danville. After a short distance, the creek reaches its confluence with the Susquehanna River.

Mahoning Creek joins the Susquehanna River 136.26 miles (219.29 km) upstream of its mouth.

=== Tributaries ===
Mahoning Creek has three named tributaries, which are known as Kase Run, Mauses Creek, and Sechler Run. The creek also has a number of unnamed tributaries. There are a total of 92 stream miles in the watershed of the creek. 90 of these stream miles are in Montour County and the other two stream miles are in Columbia County.

The watershed of the tributary Sechler Run has an area of 7.76 square miles (20.1 km^{2}). The tributary Mauses Creek joins Mahoning Creek 3.00 miles (4.83 km) upstream of its mouth and has a watershed area of 11.40 square miles (29.5 km^{2}). The tributary Kase Run reaches its confluence with the creek 4.70 miles (7.56 km) upstream of its mouth. Its watershed has an area of 7.27 square miles (18.8 km^{2}).

== Hydrology ==
The daily sediment load in Mahoning Creek is 48,768.3419 pounds (22,120.9478 kg) and daily load of phosphorus is 26.3570 pounds (11.9553 kg). The total maximum daily loads for these substances are 22,751.4043 pounds (10,319.8634 kg) and 22.8377 pounds (10.3590 kg), respectively.

There is significant stormwater flow and sedimentation in Mahoning Creek, as well as agricultural and urban runoff. However, the creek is less environmentally damaged than the nearby Chillisquaque Creek. Mahoning Creek is considered by the Pennsylvania Department of Environmental Protection to be impaired downstream of Kase Run, part of which is also impaired. Additionally, the tributary Mauses Creek is considered to be impaired, as are the upper reaches of the tributary Sechler Run. The cause of the impairment of Mahoning Creek is siltation and the source is agriculture and urban runoff/storm sewers. Sections of all three of its named tributaries are impaired, with the cause being siltation and the source being agriculture.

A total of 24,960.6159 pounds (11,321.9449 kg) of sediment from stream banks flows through Mahoning Creek daily. A daily load of 19,396.7123 pounds (8,798.2007 kg) of sediment in the creek comes from croplands, 1,609.6986 pounds (730.1470 kg) comes from land classified as "low-intensity development" by the Pennsylvania Department of Environmental Protection, and 1,564.8219 pounds (709.7913 kg) per day comes from hay and pastures. 936.9836 pounds (425.0086 kg) per day comes from forests, 147.3425 pounds (66.8334 kg) comes from land classified as "transition" by the Pennsylvania Department of Environmental Protection, and 87.0137 pounds (39.4688 kg) comes from unpaved roads. Turf grass contributes 48.9315 pounds (22.1950 kg) of sediment to the creek daily and land classified as "high-intensity development" by the Pennsylvania Department of Environmental Protection contributes 16.1644 pounds (7.3320 kg) per day. 0.0548 pounds (24.9 g) per day comes from wetlands.

15.4946 pounds (7.0282 kg) of phosphorus from croplands flows through Mahoning Creek daily, as do 4.9033 pounds (2.2241 kg) of phosphorus from groundwater and 3.4425 pounds (1.5615 kg) from hay and pastures. 0.7040 pounds (0.3193 kg) of phosphorus comes from forests, 0.5492 pounds (0.2491 kg) comes from stream banks, 0.5296 pounds (0.2402 kg) comes from land classified as "low-intensity development" by the Pennsylvania Department of Environmental Protection, and 0.2594 pounds (0.1177 kg) comes from land classified as "high-intensity development" by the Pennsylvania Department of Environmental Protection. 0.1677 pounds (76.1 g) of phosphorus per day comes from land classified as "transition" by the Pennsylvania Department of Environmental Protection, 0.0776 pounds (35.2 g) comes from turf grass, 0.0750 pounds (34.0 g) comes from septic systems, and 0.0739 pounds (33.5 g) comes from unpaved roads. Wetlands contribute 0.0002 pounds (0.091 g) of phosphorus to the creek daily.

On average, 39.3 inches (100 cm) of precipitation fall in the watershed of Mahoning Creek each year. The average annual runoff is 0.23 inches (0.58 cm).

== Geology and geography ==
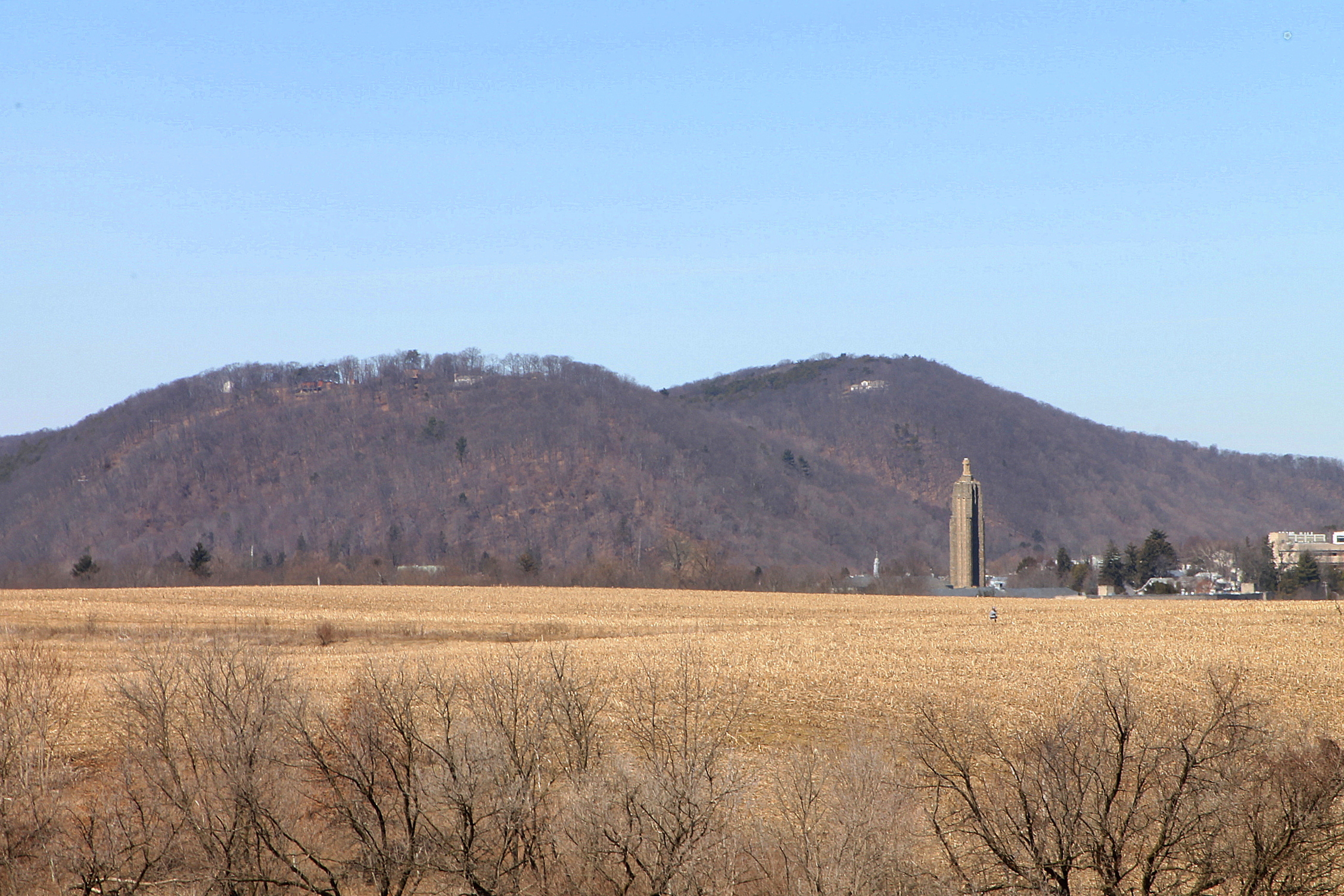
Montour Ridge, which Mahoning Creek cuts through

The elevation near the mouth of Mahoning Creek is 463 feet (141 m) above sea level. The elevation near the source of the creek is between 1,080 and 1,100 feet (330 and 340 m) above sea level. The highest parts of the watershed are in its eastern section. The watershed of Mahoning Creek is in the ridge and valley physiographic region's Appalachian Mountain Section.

In the upland parts of the watershed of Mahoning Creek, 95 percent of the rock is sedimentary rock, mainly of the Trimmers Rock Formation, the Clinton Group, the Catskill Formation, the Hamilton Group, the Bloomsburg and Mifflintown Formation, the Onondaga and Old Port Formation, and the Wills Creek Formation. The Catskill Formation occurs in a large area in the northeastern part of the watershed and the Trimmers Rock Formation occurs in the rest of the northern part of the watershed and in the southernmost part of the watershed. The Hamilton Group is to the south of the northern area of the Trimmers Rock Formation and to the north of the southern area of the formation. The Onondaga and Old Port Formation occurs south of the Hamilton Group and near Sechler Run, as does the Keyser and Tonoloway Formation. The Wills Creek Formation is found in the central part of the watershed, as is the Bloomsburg and Mifflintown Formation. The Clinton Group occurs south of these formations and south of the Clinton Group is more of the aforementioned formations.

50 percent of the rock in the Mahoning Creek watershed is of the Trimmers Rock Formation, 15 percent is of the Clinton Group, and 10 percent is of the Hamilton Group. The Bloomsburg and Mifflintown Formation occupies 8 percent of the watershed. The Keyser and Tonoloway Formation, the Wills Creek Formation, and the Catskill Formation each occupy 5 percent, while the Onondaga and Old Port Formation makes up 2 percent.

The most common soil series in the watershed of Mahoning Creek is the Berks-Weikert-Alvira series, a shaly silt loam. Other soil series in the watershed include the Chenango-Pope-Holly series, the Clymer-Buchanan-Norwich series, and the Leck Kill-Meckesville-Calvin series. The Chenango-Pope-Holly series is found in the lower reaches of the watershed, the Leck Kill-Minersville-Calvin series is found in the northwestern part of it, and the Clymer-Buchanan-Norwich series occurs in the southwestern part of the watershed. All other parts of it are occupied by the Berks-Weikert-Alvira series.

The Berks-Weikert-Alvira makes up 90 percent of the soil in the Mahoning Creek watershed. 5 percent is of the Leck Kill-Meckesville-Calvin series, 3 percent is of the Clymer-Buchanan-Norwich, and 2 percent is of the Chenango-Pope-Holly series.

Mahoning Creek cuts through Montour Ridge. It has a forested floodplain in Mahoning Township. Parts of the creek experience stream bank erosion.

== Watershed ==
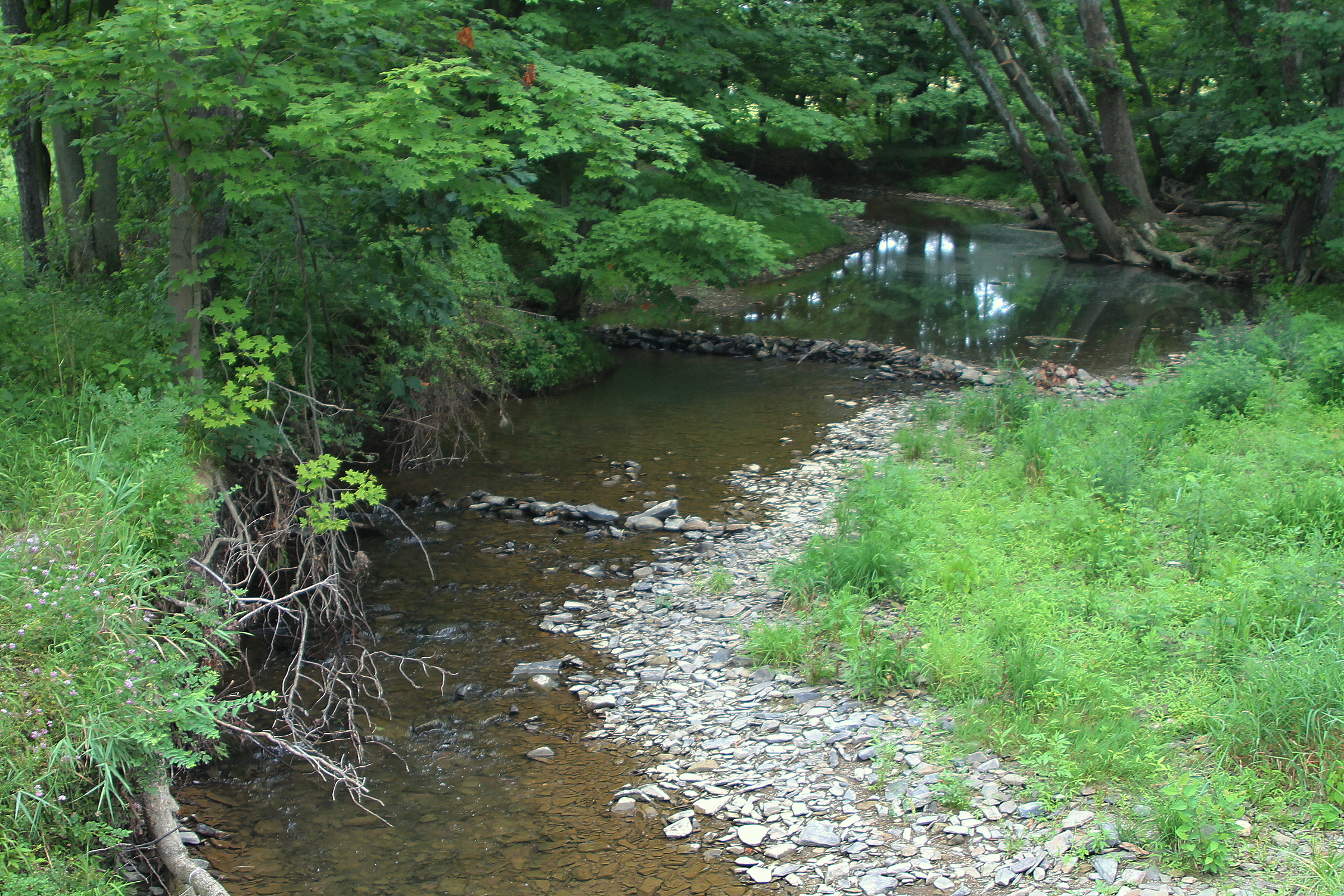
Mahoning Creek downstream of Kase Run

The watershed of Mahoning Creek has an area of 39.6 square miles (103 km^{2}). It primarily drains the central portion of Montour County and is almost entirely in Montour County. However, a small portion of the creek's watershed lies in the neighboring Columbia County. The watershed makes up 30 percent of the area of Montour County. Mahoning Creek drains the area in the vicinity of Danville. The mouth of the creek is in the United States Geological Survey quadrangle of Riverside. However, its source is in the quadrangle of Millville. It also passes through the quadrangle of Danville.

47.15 percent of the watershed of Mahoning Creek consists of forested land. 36.47 percent of the watershed is agricultural land and 16.38 percent is developed land. Most of the developed land is classified as "low-intensity development", but some is classified as "high-intensity development". There are 7.4 acres of wetlands in the watershed.

Much of the land near the mouth of Mahoning Creek is developed. A strip of land crossing the watershed in its central section is also developed. The southernmost part of the watershed is largely agricultural land. North of this is an area of mostly forested land and the central part of the watershed is mostly agricultural land. The northern part includes both forested and agricultural land. The fastest development in Montour County is occurring in the watershed of the creek.

Interstate 80 runs in an east-west direction through the watershed of Mahoning Creek. There are also a number of township roads near the creek and its tributaries. Pennsylvania Route 54, Pennsylvania Route 642, and US Route 11 are in the watershed as well.

== History and etymology ==
Mahoning Creek was entered into the Geographic Names Information System on August 2, 1979. Its identifier in the Geographic Names Information System is 1192876. The word "mahoning" is a Native American word for "at the lick".

There used to be a village of Delaware Indians at the mouth of Mahoning Creek. One of the first buildings in Danville, a gristmill built by George Montgomery's father, was built on Mahoning Creek. A tract of 180 acres in Danville, including an area along the creek, was once owned by the Penn family. Phillip Maus was among the first settlers in Valley Township, Montour County, having settled there in 1769. In 1772, Robert Curry settled on Mahoning Creek and was one of the first settlers in that part of Pennsylvania.

The first woolen mill in Danville was built on Mahoning Creek. An agricultural fair was held on the creek in February 1856. Phillip Maus once built a sawmill on Mahoning Creek. This sawmill contributed significantly to the construction of numerous wooden buildings in the vicinity.

Numerous bridges have been constructed over Mahoning Creek. A concrete tee beam bridge with a length of 49.9 feet (15.2 m) was constructed in 1930 and repaired in 1971. A two-span prestressed box beam or girders bridge with a length of 69.9 feet (21.3 m) was constructed over the creek in 1955 and repaired in 1988. Two bridge of the same type, but with one span and lengths of 44.9 feet (13.7 m) was built across the creek in 1963. These bridges carry Interstate 80. A bridge of the same type was constructed over the creek in 1971 with a length of 50.9 feet (15.5 m) and was repaired in 2008. Three more bridges of that type were constructed in Danville in 1974. They are 26.9 feet (8.2 m), 42.0 feet (12.8 m), and 100.1 feet (30.5 m) in length. Another prestressed box beam or girders bridge was constructed across the creek in 1994 with a length of 51.8 feet (15.8 m). In 1995, a prestressed slab bridge with a length of 33.1 feet (10.1 m) was built over the creek. In the same year, a prestressed box beam or girders bridge with a length of 79.1 feet (24.1 m) was constructed over the creek.

Mahoning Creek has a watershed association, which is known as the Mahoning Creek Watershed Association. It is one of two active watershed associations in Montour County. The association has carried out watershed assessments and water quality measurements of the creek. They have also worked on a watershed restoration plan.

== Biology ==
Mahoning Creek is a Trout-Stocked Fishery and a Migratory Fishery from its source to the Pennsylvania Route 54 bridge. From that point to its mouth, it is a Warmwater Fishery and a Migratory Fishery. However, the tributaries Sechler Run, Mauses Creek, and Kase Run are Coldwater Fisheries and Migratory Fisheries, as are the unnamed tributaries of Mahoning Creek. Part of Mahoning Creek, its floodplain, and the nearby slopes are part of the Montour Ridge Landscape Corridor.

Wild trout naturally reproduce in Mahoning Creek from its headwaters downstream to the US Route 11 bridge, a distance of 9.19 miles (14.79 km). It is one of only two such streams in Montour County, the other being West Branch Chillisquaque Creek. In the 1820s, there were large shad, salmon and rockfish to be found in the creek's waters. These species of fish could weigh up to 7, 15, and 30 pounds (3.2, 6.8, and 13.6 kilograms), respectively.

Eight species of birds inhabit the floodplains and slopes near Mahoning Creek. These include scarlet tanagers, black-throated green warblers, belted kingfishers, gray catbirds, black-capped chickadees, eastern wood-peewees, Louisiana waterthrushes, and wood thrushes.

Mahoning Creek lacks a riparian buffer in some places. However, the Mahoning Creek floodplain and the nearby slopes are listed as a Locally Significant site on the Montour County Natural Areas Inventory. Eastern hemlock trees inhabit the slopes and river birch, silver maple, and silky dogwood inhabit the floodplain itself. American basswood also grows in the vicinity of the creek here. Additionally, spring wildflowers grow in this area. The site has a high level of plant biodiversity. However, many trees in the area are affected by an aphid species known as the hemlock wooly adelgid.

Five species of shrubs grow in the vicinity of Mahoning Creek, its floodplain, and the nearby slopes: smooth alder, silky dogwood, gray dogwood, spicebush, and American elderberry. 11 herb species also grow in this location. These include skunk cabbage, bloodroot, sensitive fern, sedge, wood anemone, woolgrass, and others. There are also invasive plants such as multiflora rose, Japanese knotweed, and garlic mustard in the area.

== See also ==
- Gaskins Run, next tributary of the Susquehanna River going downriver
- Toby Run, next tributary of the Susquehanna River going upriver
- List of rivers of Pennsylvania
