= Indian Creek (Mauses Creek tributary) =

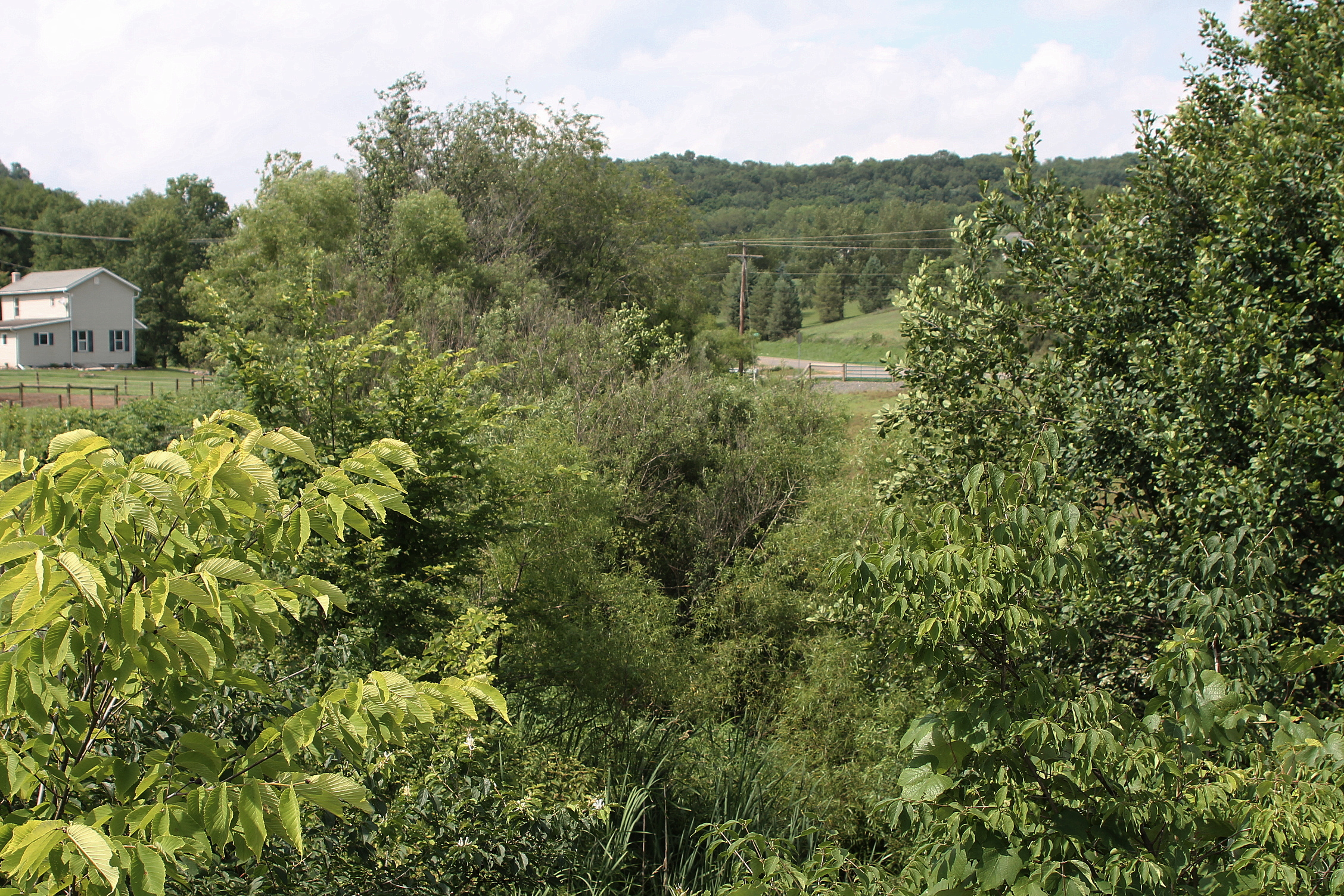
- Vegetation near Indian Creek

Physical characteristics
- Source
  - location: valley in Derry Township, Montour County, Pennsylvania
  - elevation: 840 to 860 feet (260 to 260 m)
- Mouth
  - location: Mauses Creek in Valley Township, Montour County, Pennsylvania
  - coordinates: 40°59′41″N 76°38′38″W
  - elevation: 489 ft (149 m)
- Length: 2.6 mi (4.2 km)
- Basin size: 1.92 mi^{2} (5.0 km^{2})

Basin features
- Progression: Mauses Creek → Mahoning Creek → Susquehanna River → Chesapeake Bay

Indian Creek (also known as Indian Run or Indian Run Creek) is a tributary of Mauses Creek in Montour County, Pennsylvania, in the United States. It is approximately 2.6 miles (4.2 km) and flows through Derry and Valley Townships. The creek's watershed has an area of 1.92 square miles (5.0 km^{2}).

No stream in the watershed of Indian Creek is considered by the Pennsylvania Department of Environmental Protection to be impaired. Indian Creek has an elevation of 489 feet (149 m) above sea level near its mouth. There are 82 "disturbances" on the creek. Interstate 80 crosses the creek.

== Course ==
Indian Creek begins in a valley near the southern edge of Derry Township. It flows south for a few hundred feet before entering Valley Township. A few hundred feet further downstream, the creek turns southwest and flows in this direction for several tens of a mile. It then turns south-southwest for some distance, passing through a pond, before turning south and eventually crossing Interstate 80 and Pennsylvania Route 54. Shortly after crossing these highways, the creek reaches its confluence with Mauses Creek.

Indian Creek reaches its confluence with Mauses Creek 1.20 miles (1.93 km) upstream of its mouth.

== Hydrology ==
No part of Indian Creek or any of its tributaries are considered by the Pennsylvania Department of Environmental Protection to be impaired.

The runoff curve number at Indian Creek was 60.3 in 2010. By 2020, it is predicted to be 61.3. The stormwater lag time of the creek was 66.9 minutes in 2010 and is predicted to be 65.3 minutes in 2020.

== Geography and geology ==
Indian Creek has an elevation of 489 feet (149 m) above sea level near its mouth. The headwaters of the creek are between 840 feet (260 m) and 860 feet (260 m).

There are 82 features on Indian Creek that are considered to be "disturbances". 24 of these are erosion sites (13 of which are on the creek's left bank and 11 of which are on the creek's right bank), 10 of which are deposition bars, and 9 of which are bridges. Six of the "disturbances" are pipes, six are riprap, two are tributaries, one is a concrete wall, and one is a horse crossing.

17 of the erosion sites on Indian Creek have streambank heights of less than 6 feet (1.8 m), 5 have streambank heights of 6 to 9 feet (1.8 to 2.7 m), and 2 have streambank heights of more than 9 feet (2.7 m). Three of the erosion sites on the creek have bank angles of less than 45 degrees, thirteen have bank angles between 45 and 90 degrees, and eight have bank angles over 90 degrees. Two banks on the creek are made of bedrock or boulders, 12 are made of smaller rocks, and 10 are made of sand and clay.

Eight erosion sites on Indian Creek are less than 50 feet (15 m) long. Of these, five have bank heights less than 6 feet (1.8 m) high, two have bank heights of 6 to 9 feet (1.8 to 2.7 m) high, and one has a bank height of more than 9 feet (2.7 m). Five erosion sites on the creek are between 51 feet (16 m) and 100 feet (30 m) long. Of these, four have bank heights less than 6 feet (1.8 m) high, one has a bank height of 6 to 9 feet (1.8 to 2.7 m) high, and two have bank heights of more than 9 feet (2.7 m). 11 erosion sites on the creek are over 100 feet (30 m) long. Of these, 8 have bank heights less than 6 feet (1.8 m) high, 2 have bank heights of 6 to 9 feet (1.8 to 2.7 m) high, and 1 has a bank height of more than 9 feet (2.7 m).

== Watershed and history ==
The watershed of Indian Creek has an area of 1.92 square miles (5.0 km^{2}). The creek's watershed has 4.3 miles (6.9 km) of streams.

Indian Creek is one of the main causes of flooding in Valley Township.

A pair of bridges carrying Interstate 80 were built over Indian Creek in 1963. They are both 214.9 feet (65.5 m) long. A road runs alongside the creek for at least part of its length. Township Road 371 also crosses the creek. It once underwent a replacement at a cost of $1,120,000.

== Biology ==
Three of the banks on Indian Creek are more than 60 percent covered in vegetation. 11 of the banks are between 30 and 60 percent covered in vegetation and 10 banks are less than 30 percent covered. There are riparian buffers along the creek.

The Montour County Natural Areas Inventory describes Indian Creek as "of ecological value".

== See also ==
- List of rivers of Pennsylvania
