= Kase Run =

Coordinates: 40.9943°N 76.6086°W

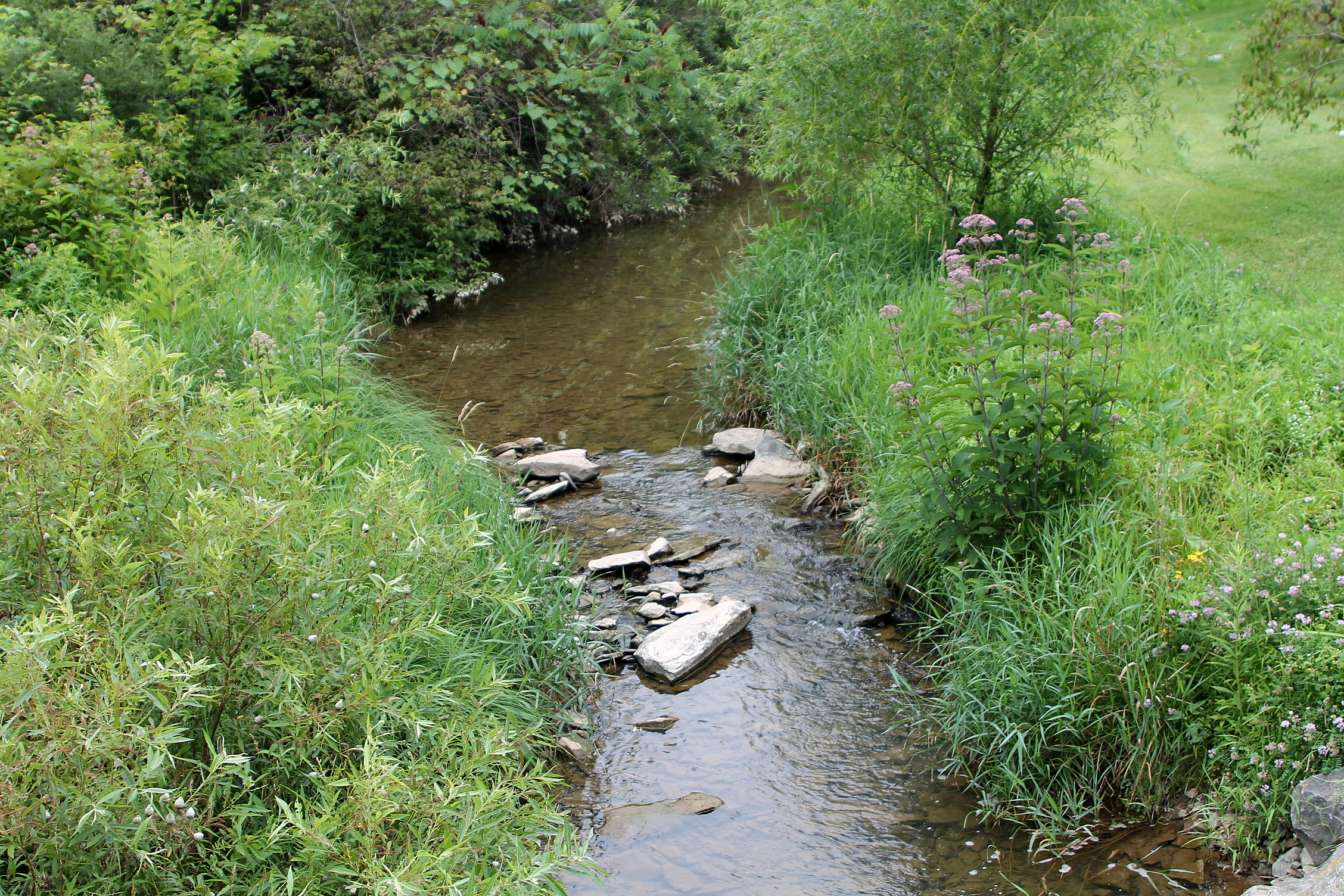
- Kase Run looking downstream in its lower reaches
- Etymology: possibly named after Abraham Kase

Physical characteristics
- Source
  - location: pond in West Hemlock Township, Pennsylvania
  - elevation: 940 feet (290 m)
- Mouth
  - location: Mahoning Creek in Valley Township, Montour County, Pennsylvania
  - elevation: 518 feet (158 m)
- Length: 4.6 mi (7.4 km)
- Basin size: 7.27 mi^{2} (18.8 km^{2})

Basin features
- Progression: Mahoning Creek → Susquehanna River → Chesapeake Bay

Kase Run is a tributary of Mahoning Creek in Montour County, Pennsylvania, in the United States. It is approximately 4.6 miles (7.4 km) long and flows through West Hemlock Township and Valley Township. The stream's watershed has an area of 7.27 square miles (18.8 km^{2}). The stream and a number of its tributaries are considered by the Pennsylvania Department of Environmental Protection to be impaired by siltation due to agriculture.

The rock in the watershed of Kase Run is of several rock formations, including the Wills Creek Formation, the Trimmers Rock Formation, the Catskill Formation, the Hamilton Group, and others. The soil series in the stream's watershed include the Leck Kill-Minersville-Calvin series and the Berks-Weikert-Bedington series. Kase Run may have been named after Abraham Kase. It is designated as a coldwater fishery.

== Course ==
Kase Run begins in a small pond immediately south of Styer Road in eastern West Hemlock Township. The stream flows southwest into a valley for approximately 0.25 miles (0.40 km) before turning south and staying in the valley. Further downstream, it turns southwest and then south again before leaving the valley. Here, it turns west and eventually enters Valley Township. It continues west for a distance before turning southwest and crossing Interstate 80. Less than a mile downstream of this point, the stream reaches its confluence with Mahoning Creek.

Kase Run joins Mahoning Creek 4.70 miles (7.56 km) upstream of its mouth.

== Hydrology ==
The water temperature of Kase Run has been described as "not particularly warm or cold" by A. Joseph Armstrong in his book Trout Unlimited's Guide to Pennsylvania Limestone Streams.

Kase Run is considered by the Pennsylvania Department of Environmental Protection to be impaired for its entire length except for its upper reaches. Several of its tributaries are also considered to be impaired. The stream and a number of its unnamed tributaries experience siltation due to agriculture.

In 2010, at various points in the watershed of Kase Run, the runoff curve numbers ranged from 58.9 to 62.4, with an average of 61.3. By 2020, the runoff curve numbers are predicted to range from 60.0 to 65.0 at these sites. The lag time for stormwater at various points in the watershed ranged from 45.5 to 79.1 minutes in 2010. The average lag time was 66.8 minutes. The lag time is predicted to range from 45.4 to 79.0 minutes in 2020. The predicted average lag time in this year is 65.1 minutes.

== Geology ==
The lower reaches of Kase Run lie over rock of the Wills Creek Formation. The middle reaches of the stream are on rock of the Hamilton Group, while the upper reaches are over rock of the Trimmers Rock Formation and the Catskill Formation. The stream's southern tributaries are on rock of the Bloomsburg and Mifflintown Formation and the Clinton Group.

The soil near the headwaters of Kase Run is of the Leck Kill-Minersville-Calvin soil series. The soil in the rest of the stream's watershed is of the Berks-Weikert-Bedington soil series.

All of the 34 streambanks on Kase Run are less than 6 feet (1.8 m) high. Six of the banks on the stream have angles of less than 45 degrees, 12 have angles that are between 45 and 90 degrees, and 16 have angles of over 90 degrees. 9 of the stream's banks are made of small rocks and 25 are made of sand and clay.

== Geography ==
The width of Kase Run ranges from 7 to 15 feet (2.1 to 4.6 m). The stream is a freestone stream.

The elevation of Kase Run near its mouth is 518 feet (158 m) above sea level. The elevation of the stream at its source is approximately 940 feet (290 m) above sea level.

There are 78 features on Kase Run that are classified as "disturbances". 34 of these are erosion sites (17 of which are on the stream's left bank and 17 of which are on its right bank), 24 are deposition bars, and eight are tributaries. Three are bridges, three are pipes, two are riprap, one is a dam, and one is a ford.

== Watershed ==
The watershed of Kase Run has an area of 7.27 square miles (18.8 km^{2}). The watershed is mostly in Montour County, but part of it is also in Columbia County. Much of the land along the stream is agricultural or developed land, but there are forested areas near the headwaters.

There are 18.67 miles (30.05 km) of streams in the watershed of Kase Run. 1.617 miles (2.602 km), or 8.7 percent, are listed as "not attaining".

== History and etymology ==
Kase Run is likely named after Abraham Kase. In the early 1800s, Kase owned a tract of land along the stream.

Three bridges over Kase Run were built in 1963. One is 36.1 feet (11.0 m) long, one is 65.0 feet (19.8 m) long, and one is 63.0 feet (19.2 m) long. The latter two carry Interstate 80.

In January 2007, 190 gallons of heating oil were spilled at a private residence and eventually contaminated a tributary of Kase Run. As a result of the spill, the Pennsylvania Department of Environmental Protection issued an $8500 fine to the Leighow Oil Company.

Historically, Kase Run was larger than it is in modern times.

== Biology ==
Although Isonychia mayflies inhabit Kase Run, no trout do. The stream is designated as a coldwater fishery.

The Montour County Natural Areas Inventory has recommended planting native trees on Kase Run. The stated purpose for this is to decrease non-point source pollution.

One of the 34 streambanks on Kase Run is more than 60 percent covered by vegetation. 22 are between 30 and 60 percent covered by vegetation and 11 are covered less than 30 percent by vegetation.

== See also ==
- Sechler Run, next tributary of Mahoning Creek going downstream
- Mauses Creek, next tributary of Mahoning Creek going upstream
- List of rivers of Pennsylvania
