= Valley Township, Nebraska =

Valley Township, Nebraska may refer to the following places:

- Valley Township, Buffalo County, Nebraska
- Valley Township, Knox County, Nebraska

See also

- Green Valley Township, Holt County, Nebraska
- Pleasant Valley Township, Dodge County, Nebraska
- Valley Township (disambiguation)
