= Valley (disambiguation) =

A valley is a low area between hills.

Valley may also refer to:

== Places ==
=== Canada ===
- Valley, Nova Scotia

=== England ===
- Valley (Waltham Forest ward)
- Valley (Liverpool ward)

=== Germany ===
- Valley, Bavaria

=== United States ===
- Valley, Alabama
- Valley, Nebraska
- Valley, New Jersey
- Valley, Ohio
- Valley, Providence, Rhode Island, a neighborhood
- Valley, Washington
- Valley, West Virginia
- Valley, Wisconsin
- Valley Creek (Pennsylvania), a tributary of the Schuylkill River in Pennsylvania
- Valley Mountains, of Utah

=== Wales ===
- Valley, Anglesey

== People ==
- Alvin Valley, American fashion designer
- Dylan Valley, South African film producer
- F. Wayne Valley (1914–1986), American businessman, original part-owner and managing partner of the Oakland Raiders
- John W. Valley (born 1948), American geochemist
- Mark Valley (born 1964), American actor
- Paul Michael Valley (born 1966), American actor

== Arts, entertainment, and media ==
- Valley (band), a Canadian indie pop band
- Valley (video game), a first-person adventure game
- Valley Records, a record label

== Brands and enterprises ==
- Valley-Dynamo LLC
  - Valley Co., an American manufacturer of pool tables; now a subsidiary of Valley-Dynamo LLC

== Other uses ==
- Valley girl, a socio-economic classification
  - Valleyspeak or Valspeak, an American sociolect primarily associated with Valley girls
- Valley railway station, Wales

== See also ==
- Vallay
- Vallée
- The Valley (disambiguation)
- Valley Center (disambiguation)
- Valley City (disambiguation)
- Valley County (disambiguation)
- Valley Township (disambiguation)
- Valley View (disambiguation)
