= Valley Township =

Valley Township may refer to:

== Arkansas ==
- Valley Township, Cleburne County, Arkansas, in Cleburne County, Arkansas
- Valley Township, Hot Spring County, Arkansas, in Hot Spring County, Arkansas
- Valley Township, Madison County, Arkansas
- Valley Township, Ouachita County, Arkansas, in Ouachita County, Arkansas
- Valley Township, Pope County, Arkansas
- Valley Township, Washington County, Arkansas, in Washington County, Arkansas

== Illinois ==
- Valley Township, Stark County, Illinois

== Iowa ==
- Valley Township, Guthrie County, Iowa
- Valley Township, Page County, Iowa
- Valley Township, Pottawattamie County, Iowa

== Kansas ==
- Valley Township, Barber County, Kansas
- Valley Township, Ellsworth County, Kansas
- Valley Township, Hodgeman County, Kansas
- Valley Township, Kingman County, Kansas
- Valley Township, Lincoln County, Kansas, in Lincoln County, Kansas
- Valley Township, Linn County, Kansas, in Linn County, Kansas
- Valley Township, Miami County, Kansas, in Miami County, Kansas
- Valley Township, Osborne County, Kansas, in Osborne County, Kansas
- Valley Township, Phillips County, Kansas, in Phillips County, Kansas
- Valley Township, Reno County, Kansas, in Reno County, Kansas
- Valley Township, Rice County, Kansas
- Valley Township, Scott County, Kansas, in Scott County, Kansas
- Valley Township, Sheridan County, Kansas
- Valley Township, Smith County, Kansas, in Smith County, Kansas

== Michigan ==
- Valley Township, Allegan County, Michigan

== Minnesota ==
- Valley Township, Marshall County, Minnesota

== Missouri ==
- Valley Township, Macon County, Missouri

== Nebraska ==
- Valley Township, Buffalo County, Nebraska
- Valley Township, Knox County, Nebraska

== North Dakota ==
- Valley Township, Barnes County, North Dakota
- Valley Township, Dickey County, North Dakota, in Dickey County, North Dakota
- Valley Township, Kidder County, North Dakota, in Kidder County, North Dakota

== Ohio ==
- Valley Township, Guernsey County, Ohio
- Valley Township, Scioto County, Ohio

== Oklahoma ==
- Valley Township, Canadian County, Oklahoma
- Valley Township, Grant County, Oklahoma
- Valley Township, Pawnee County, Oklahoma
- Valley Township, Woods County, Oklahoma

== Pennsylvania ==
- Valley Township, Armstrong County, Pennsylvania
- Valley Township, Chester County, Pennsylvania
- Valley Township, Montour County, Pennsylvania

== South Dakota ==
- Valley Township, Beadle County, South Dakota, in Beadle County, South Dakota
- Valley Township, Day County, South Dakota, in Day County, South Dakota
- Valley Township, Douglas County, South Dakota, in Douglas County, South Dakota
- Valley Township, Hughes County, South Dakota, in Hughes County, South Dakota
- Valley Township, Hutchinson County, South Dakota, in Hutchinson County, South Dakota
- Valley Township, Hyde County, South Dakota, in Hyde County, South Dakota
- Valley Township, Tripp County, South Dakota, in Tripp County, South Dakota

== See also ==
- Valley (disambiguation)
