= Valley Township, Pennsylvania =

Valley Township is the name of some places in the U.S. state of Pennsylvania:

- Valley Township, Armstrong County, Pennsylvania
- Valley Township, Chester County, Pennsylvania
- Valley Township, Montour County, Pennsylvania
