= Center Valley =

Center Valley may refer to:

- Center Valley, Arkansas
- Center Valley, Morgan County, Indiana
- Center Valley, Pennsylvania
- Center Valley, Wisconsin

== See also ==
- Valley Center (disambiguation)
