= Milton State Park =

State park in Pennsylvania, United States

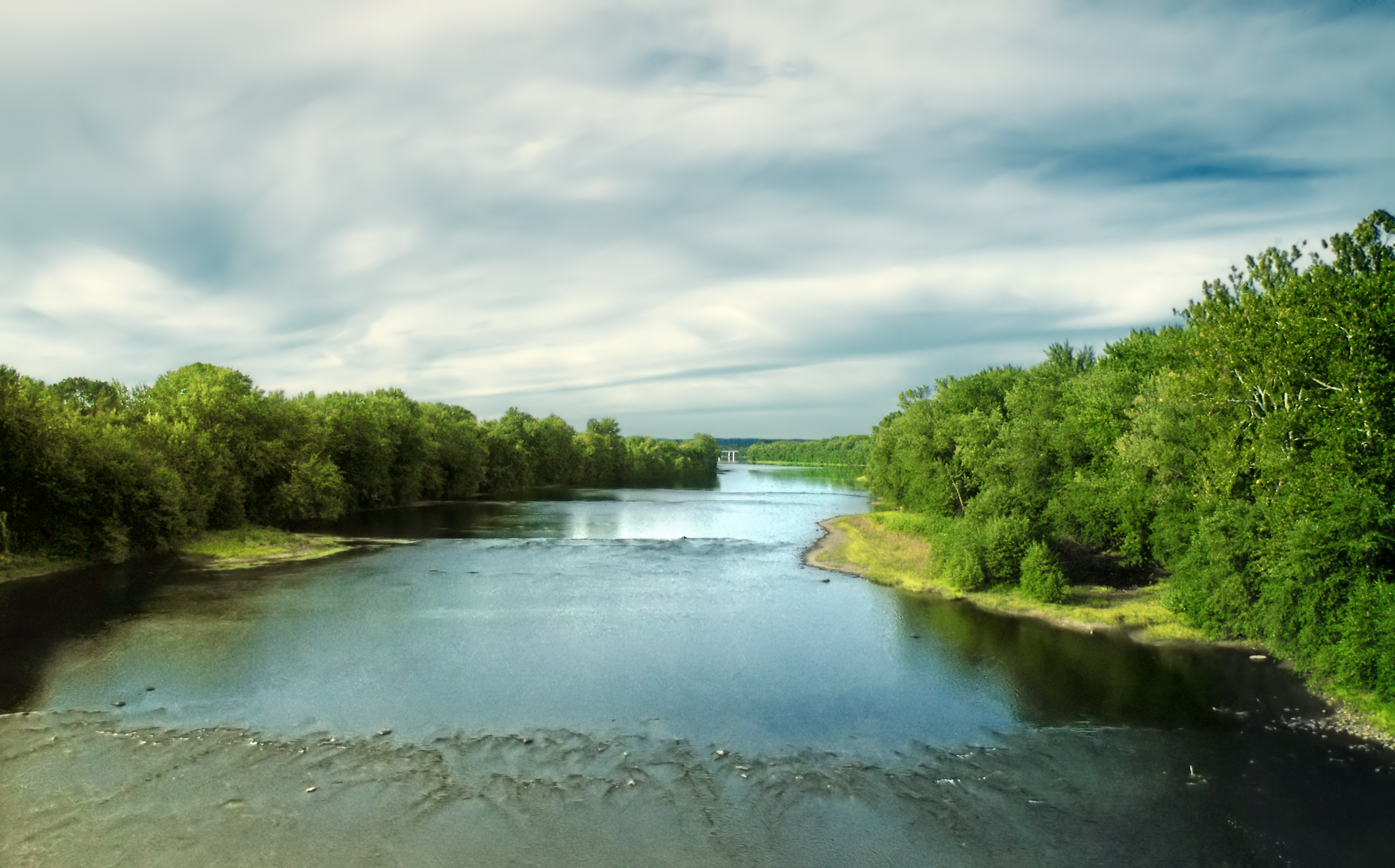

- Location within Pennsylvania Location within the United States
- Interactive map of Milton State Park
- Location: Milton, Pennsylvania, United States
- Coordinates: 41°01′05″N 76°51′42″W
- Area: 82 acres (33 ha)
- Elevation: 453 feet (138 m)
- Established: 1966
- Administrator: Pennsylvania Department of Conservation and Natural Resources
- Website: Official website
- Pennsylvania State Parks

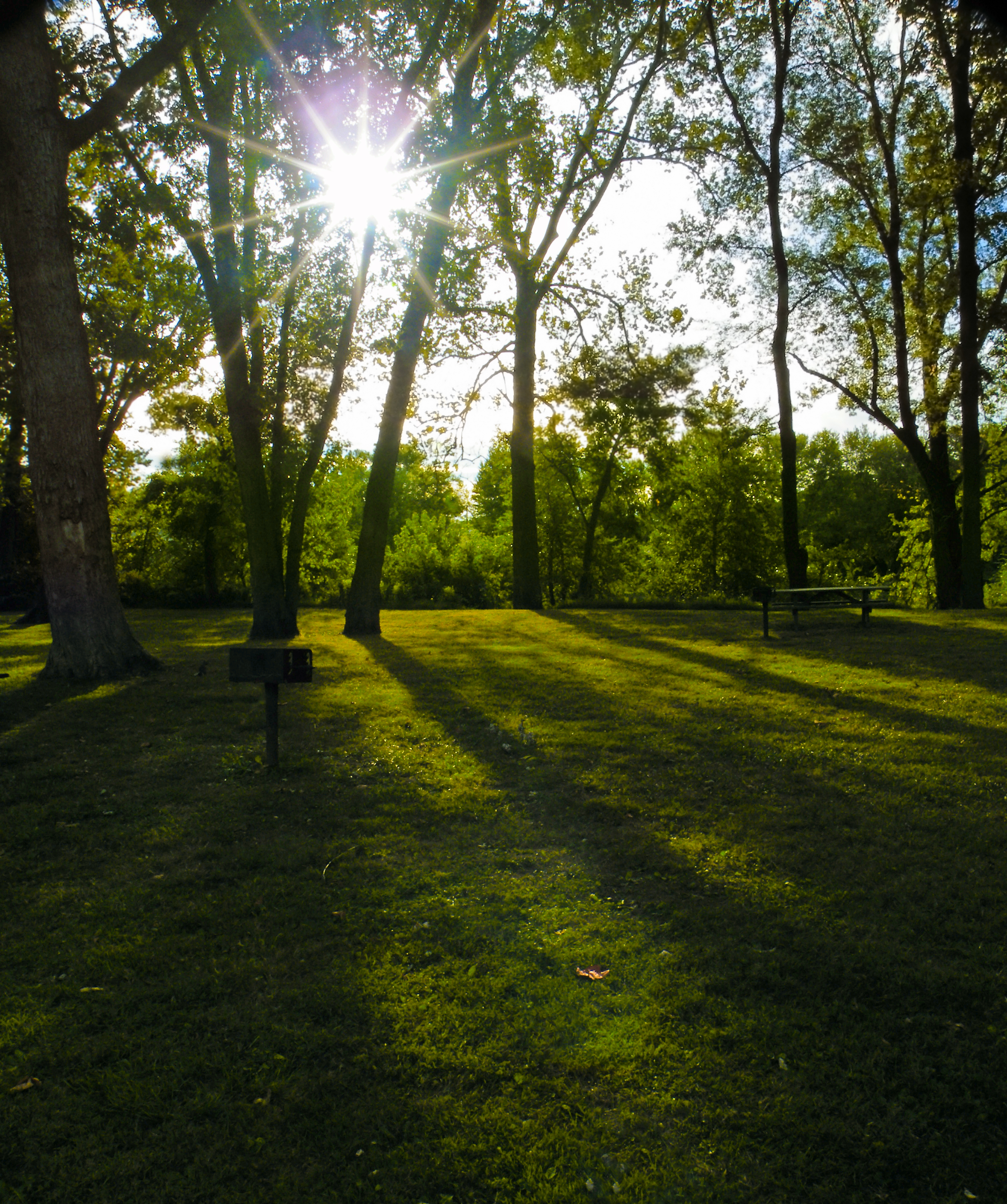
A late summer afternoon at the park

Milton State Park is an 82-acre (33 ha) Pennsylvania state park in the borough of Milton in Northumberland County, Pennsylvania in the United States. The park is on Montgomery Island in the West Branch Susquehanna River, just east of the village of West Milton in Union County. Milton State Park is on Pennsylvania Route 642.

== History ==
The recorded history of Milton State Park begins in 1762 when Marcus Huling Jr. made a claim on the island in the West Branch Susquehanna River. Huling planted an apple orchard on what was to become known as Montgomery Island.

Ownership of the island eventually transferred to the Straub Family. The Straubs built a dam across part of the river in 1824. The Straubs ran a sawmill and gristmill on the island and built a bridge between the island to the banks of the West Branch Susquehanna River. In time, the mills closed and the land was used for farming. The island was no longer used for farming by the early 1900s.

Over the next 60 years the island was divided among several owners and used as a picnic ground with several athletic fields. The Milton Rotary Club and the Borough of Milton worked together to consolidate the deeds and transferred ownership of Montgomery Island to the Commonwealth of Pennsylvania in 1966.

Hurricane Agnes wiped out the newly created Milton State Park in 1972. The island and much of Pennsylvania in the Susquehanna River watershed was flooded extensively by the hurricane. The park was eventually rebuilt with federal disaster relief funds.

== Nature ==
Milton State Park is within sight of downtown Milton, Pennsylvania. The island is surrounded by the waters of the West Branch Susquehanna River and the southern part of the island is not developed. It is covered in a forest of river birch, silver maple, and sycamore trees. Milton State Park is a haven for migrating birds and waterfowl.

== Recreation ==
There are several soccer and softball fields that are used by the residents of West Milton and Milton for recreational and church league events. Montgomery Island is a stopping point for those navigating the river in canoes and kayaks. Milton State Park is also used by those taking a short trip from Milton or West Milton for a day of fishing for catfish, panfish, bass, northern pike and muskellunge. There is 1 mile (1.6 km) of hiking trail on the northern side of the park.

The northern side of the park has picnic facilities, including picnic tables and charcoal grills. There is also access to fresh drinking water and restroom facilities.
