= Pennsylvania Route 642 =

State highway in Pennsylvania, US

Pennsylvania Route 642

Route information
- Maintained by PennDOT
- Length: 21.455 mi (34.528 km)

Major junctions
- West end: US 15 in Kelly Township
- PA 147 near Milton; PA 54 in Valley Township
- East end: PA 44 / PA 254 in Madison Township

Location
- Country: United States
- State: Pennsylvania
- Counties: Union, Northumberland, Montour, Columbia

Highway system
- Pennsylvania State Route System; Interstate; US; State; Scenic; Legislative
← PA 641	→ PA 643

Pennsylvania Route 642 (PA 642) is a 21.4-mile-long (34.4 km) state highway located in Union, Northumberland, Montour, and Columbia counties in Pennsylvania. The western terminus is at the intersection of Third Street and Broad Street in West Milton near an interchange with U.S. Route 15 (US 15). The eastern terminus is at PA 254 and PA 44 in Jerseytown.

== Route description ==
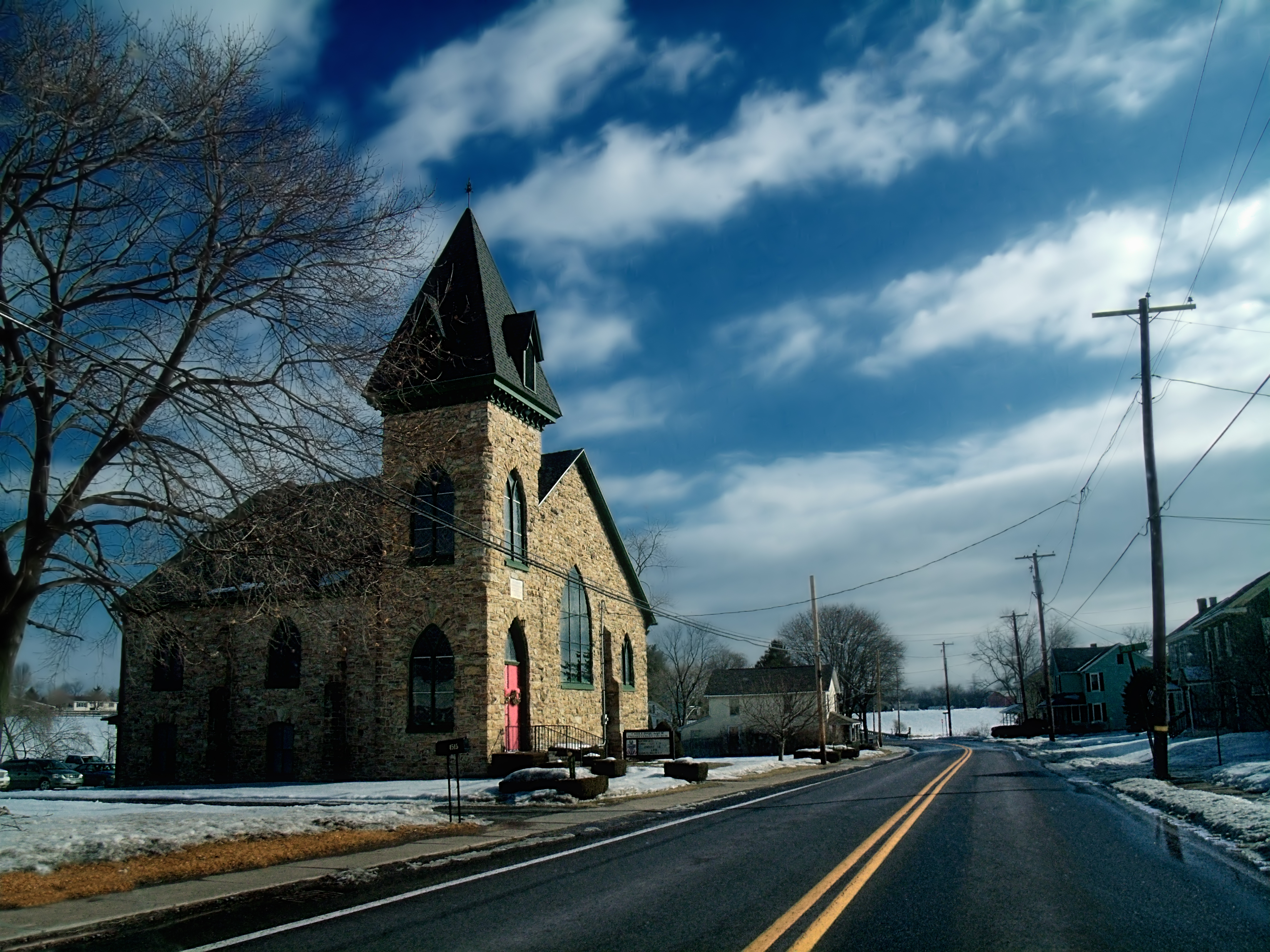
PA 642 in East Chillisquaque Township

PA 642 begins at a signalized intersection where Third Street (designated SR 1101 by the Pennsylvania Department of Transportation (PennDOT)) and Broad Street (SR 1004) in the community of West Milton in Kelly Township, Union County. The intersection is located just east of an interchange with the US 15 freeway. Third Street is a former section of US 15 and is used to access the northbound lanes of the freeway. PA 642 heads east on two-lane undivided Broad Street. The road passes through residential areas with some businesses before crossing a Union County Industrial Railroad line. The route crosses the West Branch Susquehanna River into the borough of Milton in Northumberland County, where the road becomes Mahoning Street and heads onto Montgomery Island, which contains Milton State Park. On the island, the road briefly becomes a divided highway and comes to a right-in/right-out access point to the state park. PA 642 crosses to the east bank of the river and heads southeast through commercial areas, intersecting a one-way pair that carries PA 405. The road crosses Norfolk Southern's Buffalo Line and heads through residential areas. The route enters Turbot Township and runs past more homes, coming to an interchange with the PA 147 freeway. Past this interchange, PA 642 crosses into East Chillisquaque Township and becomes an unnamed road, heading through agricultural areas with some woods and homes. The road turns east and heads through Pottsgrove before crossing the Chillisquaque Creek.

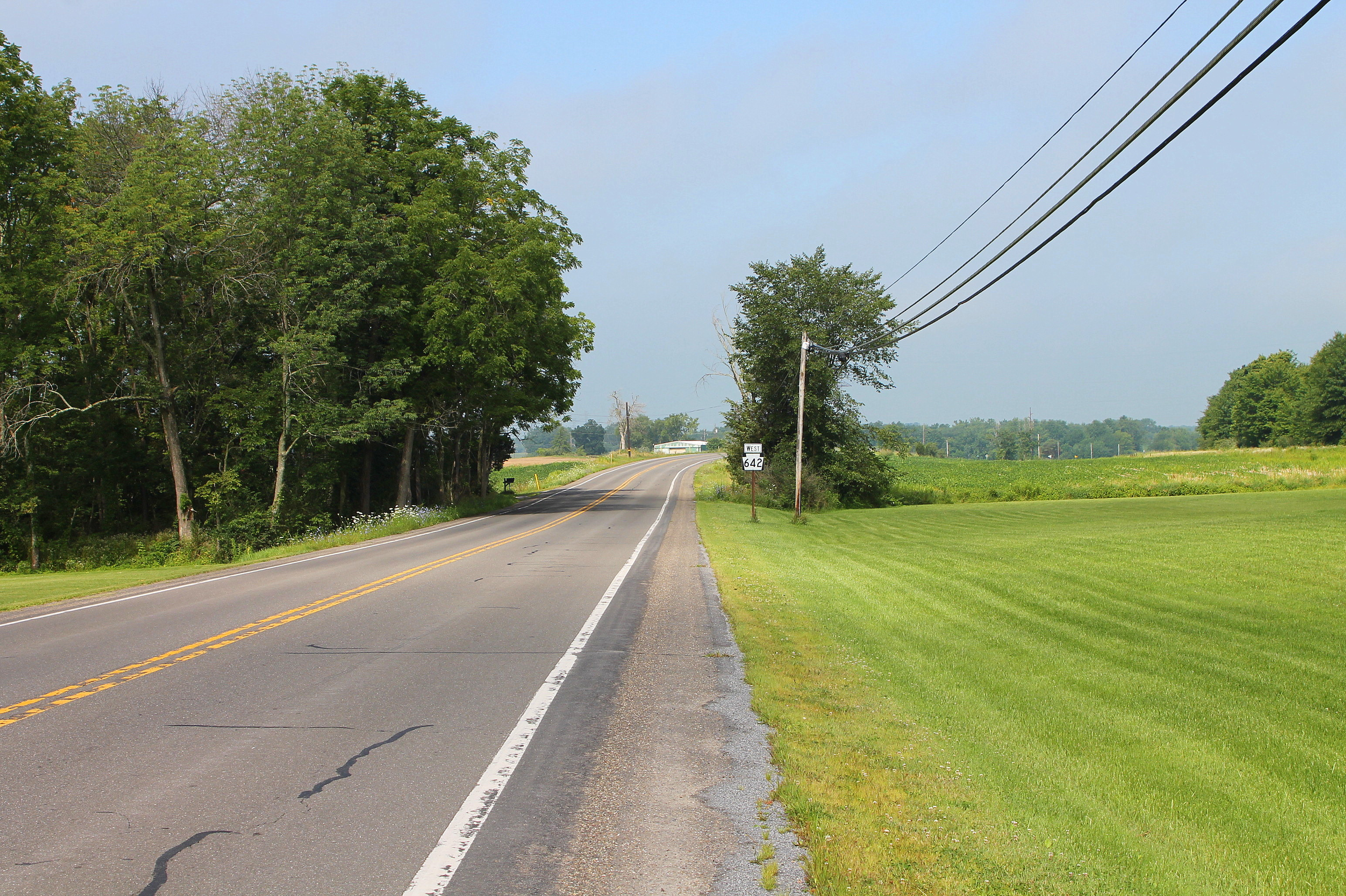
PA 642 west in Liberty Township, Montour County

PA 642 continues into Liberty Township in Montour County and becomes Liberty Valley Road, running through more open agricultural areas with some residences. The road heads into woodland and intersects the eastern terminus of PA 45, continuing through a mix of farmland and woods with homes. The route heads through more rural areas, crossing into Valley Township and passing through the residential community of Mausdale before intersecting PA 54. A park and ride lot is located east of this intersection. Here, PA 642 turns southeast to form a concurrency with PA 54 on Continental Boulevard, a four-lane divided highway. PA 642 splits from PA 54 by heading northeast on two-lane undivided Jerseytown Road. The road heads through farmland and woodland with some homes, passing over I-80. The route continues north into more forested areas with some fields and residences, becoming the border between Derry Township to the west and West Hemlock Township to the east. PA 642 turns northeast to fully enter West Hemlock Township and runs through more agricultural and wooded areas with occasional homes. The road heads into Madison Township in Columbia County and becomes Danville Road, heading through more wooded areas with some fields, reaching an intersection with PA 44. The route continues north concurrent with PA 44, heading through open agricultural areas with occasional residences and businesses. The road turns northwest and intersects PA 254 in Jerseytown, where PA 642 ends and PA 44 continues northwest.

== History ==
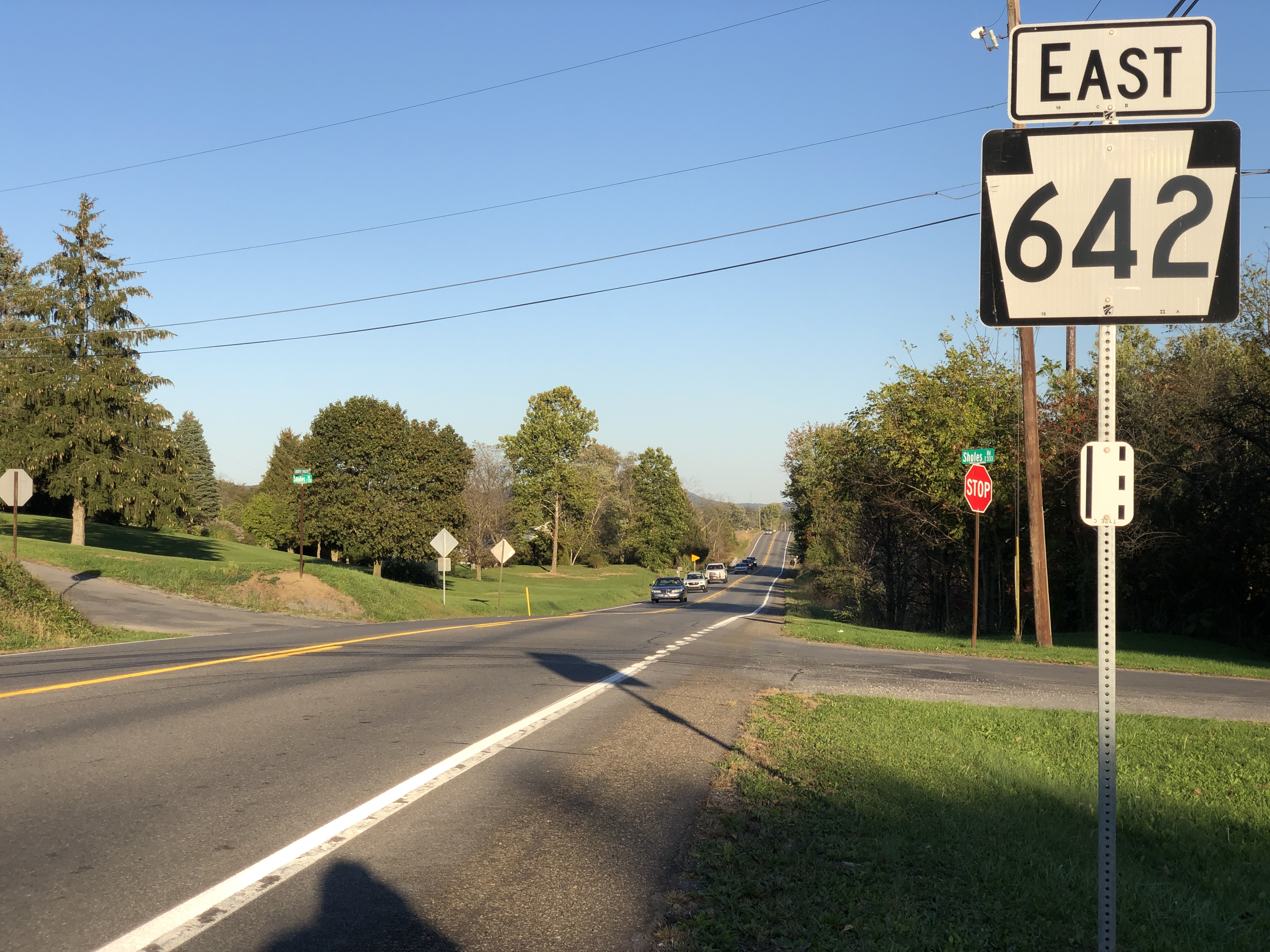
PA 642 eastbound in Liberty Township

PA 642 was created in the 1950s replacing the route of PA 115 between West Milton and Jerseytown. No major changes have occurred to the routing since then.

== Major intersections ==
County	Location	mi	km	Destinations	Notes
Union	Kelly Township	0.000	0.000	Third Street to US 15 north – Williamsport Broad Street west to US 15 south – Lewisburg	Western terminus
Northumberland	Milton	0.250– 0.307	0.402– 0.494	Milton State Park	Interchange
Northumberland	Milton	0.593	0.954	PA 405 south (Front Street)	
Northumberland	Milton	0.681	1.096	PA 405 north (Arch Street)	
Northumberland	Turbot Township	2.059– 2.170	3.314– 3.492	PA 147 (Susquehanna Trail) – Williamsport, Sunbury	Interchange
Montour	Liberty Township	8.027	12.918	PA 45 west (Purple Heart Highway) – Lewisburg	Eastern terminus of PA 45
Montour	Valley Township	12.971	20.875	PA 54 west (Continental Boulevard) – Turbotville	West end of PA 54 concurrency
Montour	Valley Township	13.301	21.406	PA 54 east (Continental Boulevard) – Danville	East end of PA 54 concurrency
Columbia	Madison Township	20.355	32.758	PA 44 south (Buckhorn Road) – Bloomsburg	West end of PA 44 concurrency
Columbia	Madison Township	21.455	34.528	PA 44 north (White Hall Road); PA 254 (Washingtonville Road / Jerseytown Road) – Washingtonville, Millville	Eastern terminus; east end of PA 44 concurrency
1.000 mi = 1.609 km; 1.000 km = 0.621 mi: Concurrency terminus
