= The Valley =

The Valley or The Valleys may refer to:

== Places known as "The Valley" ==
- The Valley (stadium), home ground of Charlton Athletic Football Club, United Kingdom
- The Valley, Anguilla, the capital of Anguilla
- The Valley, a shopping mall in San Diego, California, United States
- The Valleys or the South Wales Valleys, United Kingdom
- Moonee Valley Racecourse, a horse racing track in Melbourne, Australia
- Tóin an tSeanbhaile, a village on Achill Island, Co. Mayo, Ireland, known colloquially in English as The Valley
- San Fernando Valley, California, United States
- Phoenix metropolitan area, Arizona, United States
- Lower Rio Grande Valley, Texas, United States
- Lower Naugatuck Valley, Connecticut, United States
- Fortitude Valley, Queensland, Australia

== Artworks ==
- The Valley (suite), a 1990 suite of etchings by Keith Haring with text by William S. Burroughs

== Film and television ==
- The Valley (1976 film), a 1976 amateur film by Peter Jackson
- The Valley (2014 film), a 2014 Lebanese film
- The Valley (2017 film), an American drama film
- La Vallée (film), a 1972 French film also known as The Valley
- The Valley, a fictional television series on The O.C.
- The Valleys (TV series), a British reality series
- The Valley (TV series), a 2024 American reality television series

== Literature ==
- The Valley (novel), a 2005 novel by Barry Pilton
- The Valley, the final chapter of The Western Lands

== Music ==
- The Valley (band), a band from Sydney
- The Valley (Ashton Nyte album) (2009)
- The Valley (Betty Who album) (2017)
- The Valley (Charley Crockett album) (2019)
- The Valley (Whitechapel album) (2019)
- The Valley, a 2011 Eisley album
- "The Valley", a 2016 single by Clare Maguire
- "The Valley", a song from Duran Duran's album Red Carpet Massacre
- "The Valley", a song by The Interrupters from the 2016 album Say it out Loud
- "The Valley", a song from Jane Siberry's album Bound by the Beauty
- "The Valley", a song by Keshia Chanté
- "The Valley", a song by Los Lobos on The Town and the City (album) (2006)
- "The Valley", a song by the Oh Hellos
- "The Valleys", a song from The Mountains' album The Mountains, the Valleys, the Lakes (2014)

== Schools ==
- The Valley School, Bangalore, India
- The Valley Secondary School, former name of Albena Lake-Hodge Comprehensive School, Anguilla

== See also ==
- Valley, a geographical feature
- Valley (disambiguation)
