= Pennsylvania Route 54 =

State highway in Pennsylvania, US

Pennsylvania Route 54

Route information
- Maintained by PennDOT
- Length: 81.599 mi (131.321 km)
- Existed: 1928–present

Major junctions
- West end: US 15 near Montgomery
- PA 405 in Montgomery; I-180 near Milton; PA 44 in Turbotville; I-80 near Danville; US 11 in Danville; PA 61 in Mount Carmel; PA 901 in Mount Carmel; PA 61 in Ashland; I-81 in Mahanoy City; PA 309 in Hometown
- East end: US 209 in Nesquehoning

Location
- Country: United States
- State: Pennsylvania
- Counties: Lycoming, Northumberland, Montour, Columbia, Schuylkill, Carbon

Highway system
- Pennsylvania State Route System; Interstate; US; State; Scenic; Legislative
| ← PA 53 | → PA 55 |

Pennsylvania Route 54 (PA 54) is a state highway which runs for 82 miles (132 km) in eastern Pennsylvania in the United States.

The highway runs from U.S. Route 15 (US 15), which is three miles (5 km) west of Montgomery, Lycoming County, in the west, to US 209 in Nesquehoning, Carbon County, in the east.

== Route description ==
=== Montgomery to Danville ===
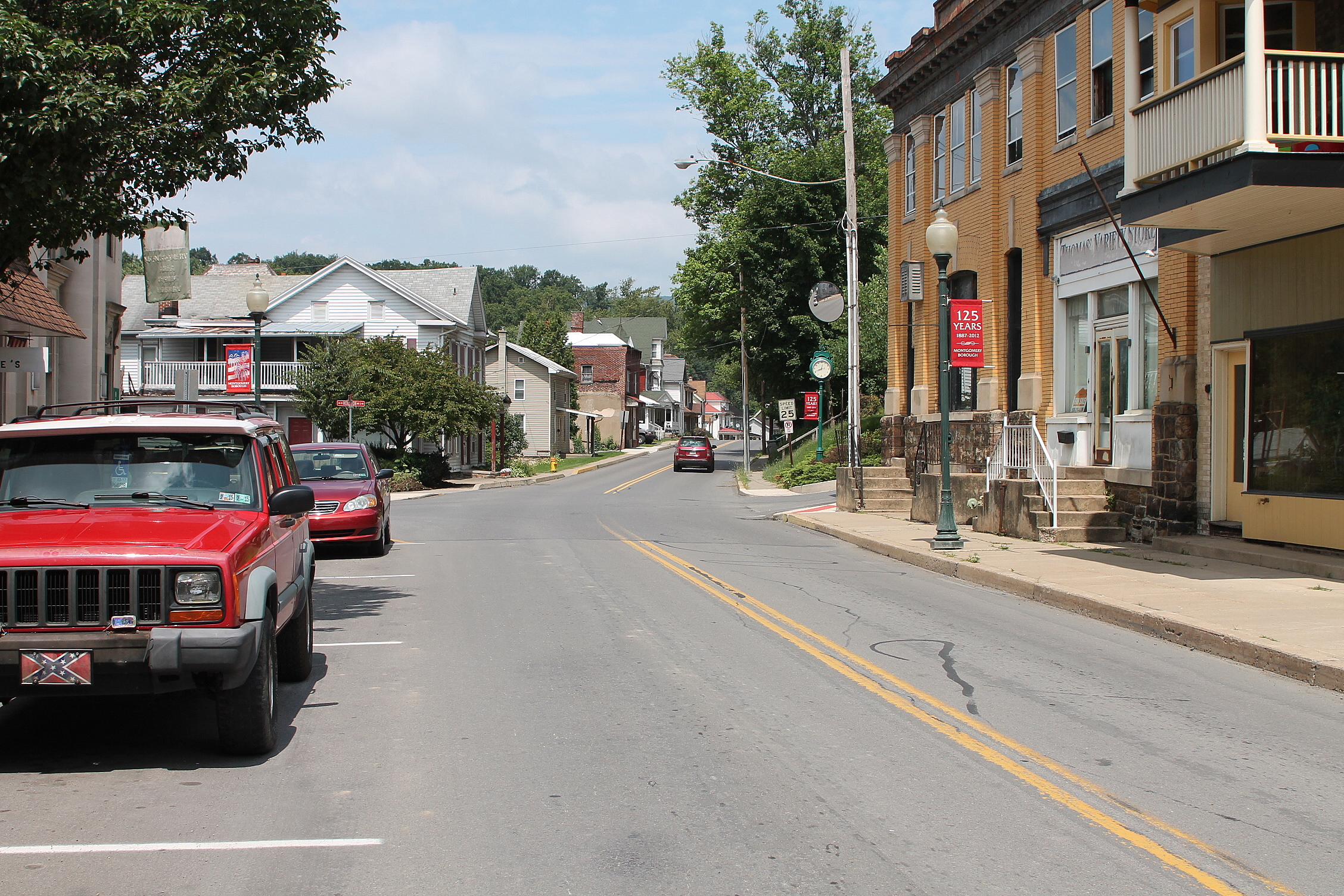
PA 54 westbound in Montgomery

PA 54 begins at an intersection with US 15 in Clinton Township, Lycoming County, heading east on a two-lane undivided road. The road passes through farmland and woodland with homes as it passes to the south of Bald Eagle Mountain. The route curves southeast before it turns south and runs past businesses.

PA 54 enters the borough of Montgomery and becomes Main Street, passing homes. The route passes through the downtown area of Montgomery before it turns northeast onto Montgomery Street, running between residences and businesses to the northwest and Norfolk Southern's Buffalo Line to the southeast. PA 54 comes to an intersection with PA 405, which continues northeast on Montgomery Street, and the two routes become concurrent and head southeast on 2nd Street, crossing the railroad tracks and running through residential areas.

The road crosses the West Branch Susquehanna River and leaves Montgomery for Muncy Creek Township, becoming unnamed and turning southwest into wooded areas.

PA 54/PA 405 head into Delaware Township in Northumberland County and run through farmland before PA 405 splits to the southwest. PA 54 continues southeast through farm fields and woodland, passing through Delaware Run. The road runs through more rural land with some development, heading more to the east.

The route reaches a diamond interchange with Interstate 180 (I-180), with a park and ride lot located at the northwest corner of this interchange. Past here, PA 54 has an intersection with the Susquehanna Trail, at which point it crosses into Lewis Township. The road curves southeast and runs through agricultural areas with some woods and residences. The route heads into the borough of Turbotville and passes businesses, coming to an intersection with PA 44.

At this point, PA 44 turns east for a concurrency with PA 54 and the road gains a center left-turn lane as it runs past more businesses. The road becomes two lanes again and heads back into Lewis Township, running through a patch of woodland before heading through farmland with some development.

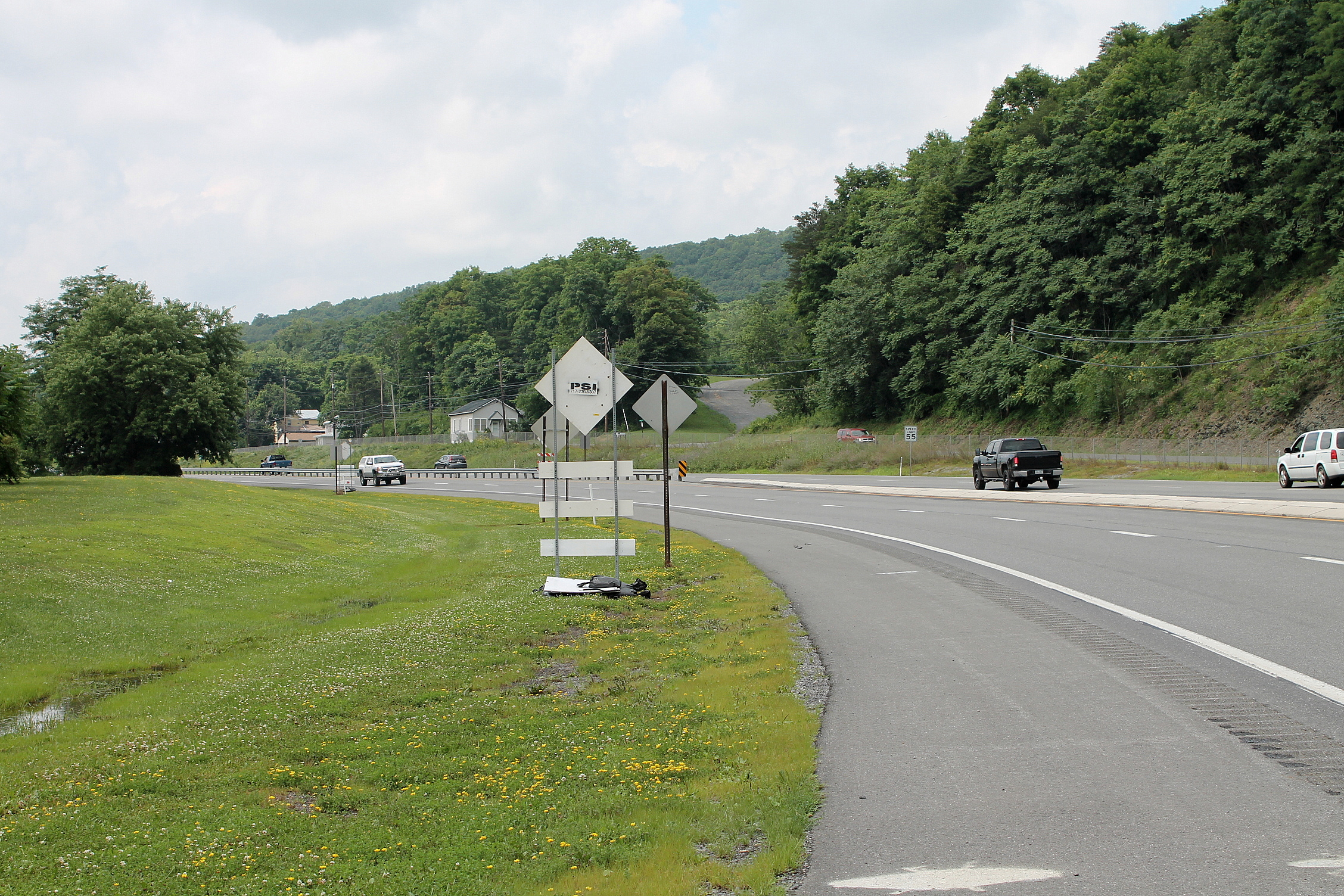
PA 54 north of Danville

PA 44/PA 54 head into Limestone Township in Montour County and the road becomes Continental Boulevard, passing through more rural areas. PA 44 splits from PA 54 near Schuyler by turning northeast, and PA 54 continues southeast into Anthony Township. The road runs through farmland with some wooded areas and residences. The route crosses into Derry Township, turning south in Dieffenbach and crossing Norfolk Southern's Watsontown Secondary before running through rural areas to the west of the Montour Power Plant.

PA 54 crosses the Chillisquaque Creek before it enters the small borough of Washingtonville, where the name becomes Water Street and the route is lined with homes along with a few businesses. The road heads back into Derry Township and becomes Continental Boulevard again, running through woods before coming to a junction with PA 254. The route continues south through farmland with some wooded areas and homes, heading into Valley Township.

PA 54 heads into forested areas and gains a second eastbound lane as it climbs a hill, turning to the east into areas of fields with some homes. The road becomes two lanes again briefly before it gains a second westbound lane as it descends the hill, heading into forests and turning to the south.

The route becomes a four-lane divided highway and curves southeast, passing through rural areas with some homes. PA 54 comes to a partial cloverleaf interchange with I-80 and heads past businesses. The road runs through wooded areas with some development prior to reaching an intersection with PA 642 near Mausdale. A park and ride lot is located east of this intersection.

Here, PA 642 heads southeast for a short concurrency with PA 54 before it splits to the northeast. PA 54 crosses into Mahoning Township and heads through a gap in forested Montour Ridge, passing near some development. The road turns south and enters the borough of Danville, running past businesses.

The route heads south-southwest and comes to an intersection with US 11 before it crosses the North Shore Railroad. PA 54 passes more commercial development before coming to an intersection with Mahoning Street. At this point, the route becomes two-lane undivided Factory Street and heads through a short tunnel as it passes through a residential neighborhood, coming to a bridge over the Susquehanna River and crossing back into Mahoning Township as it begins to head over the river.

=== Danville to Ashland ===
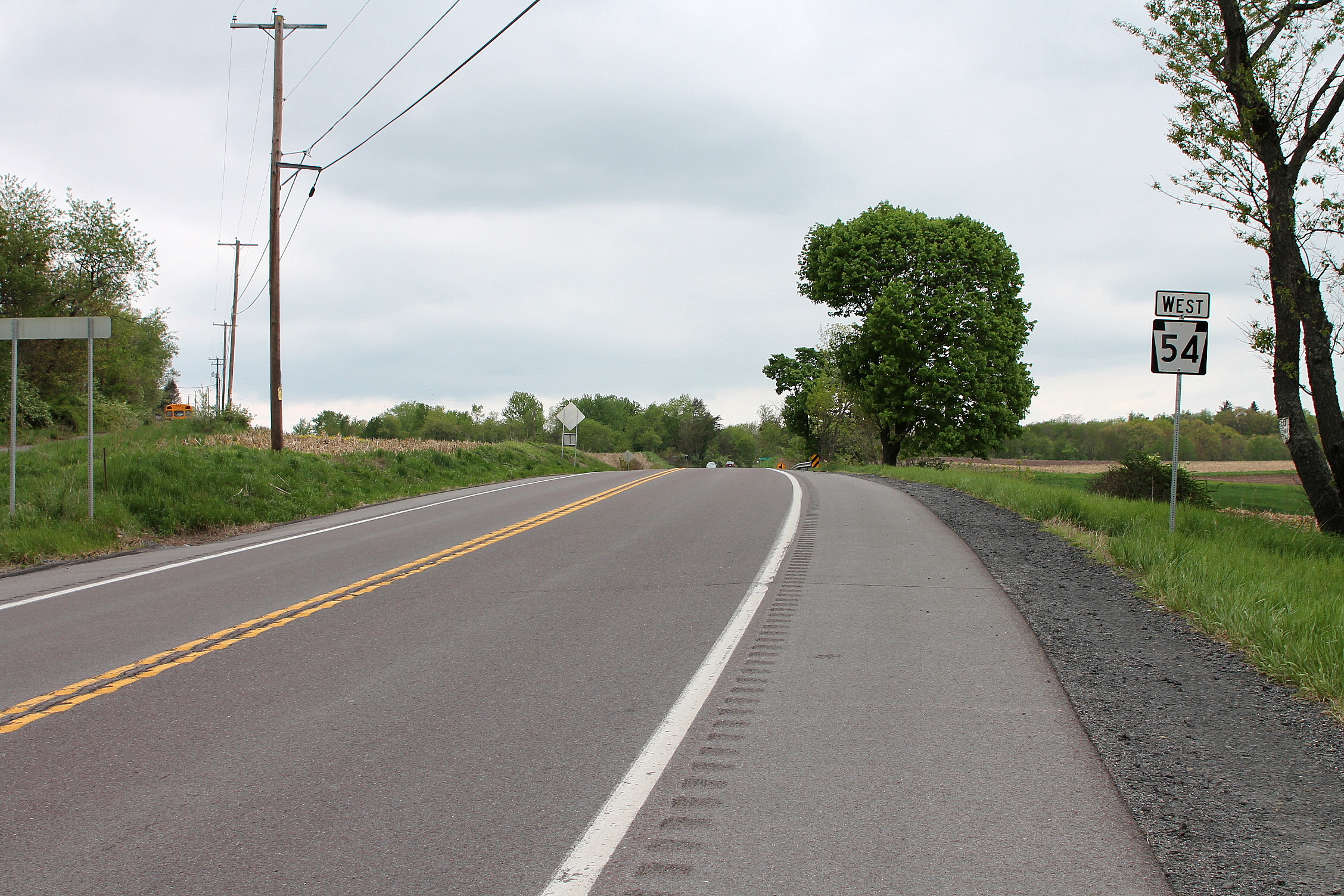
PA 54 westbound a few miles southeast of Elysburg

Upon crossing the Susquehanna River, PA 54 enters the borough of Riverside in Northumberland County and becomes Mill Street, crossing Norfolk Southern's Sunbury Line. Immediately after the railroad crossing, the route turns southeast onto Elysburg Road and runs between residential areas to the southwest and the Sunbury Line and the Susquehanna River to the northeast. The road leaves Riverside for Rush Township and heads through wooded areas alongside the railroad tracks and the river.

The Sunbury Line and Susquehanna River curve east away from the road and the route continues southeast through farmland with some woods and development. PA 54 turns south and continues through rural land, curving back to the southeast. The road gains a second eastbound lane and passes through Union Corner as it ascends a hill. The route reaches the top of the hill and is briefly four lanes before it descends the hill with one eastbound lane and two westbound lanes.

PA 54 continues southeast through farms and woods with some homes and descends a hill as it gains a second westbound lane. The road briefly enters Mayberry Township in Montour County before it enters Ralpho Township in Northumberland County and turns south and then southwest through forested areas. The route curves south and becomes North Market Street, heading through farmland with some development and narrowing back to two lanes. PA 54 continues into Elysburg, where it heads past homes and a few businesses. The road turns southeast and becomes South Market Street, running through more developed areas. The route crosses PA 487 in an area of businesses and continues southeast through residential areas with some farmland.

PA 54 gains a second eastbound lane as it ascends a forested hill, turning to the east. The road becomes unnamed and is three lanes with two westbound lanes and one eastbound lane as it descends the hill. The route becomes two lanes again and runs through farmland with some woods and residences, passing through Bear Gap.

PA 54 heads south through Bear Gap in forested Little Mountain to the west of the South Branch Roaring Creek, gaining a second eastbound lane and crossing into Coal Township. The road turns east and ascends forested Big Mountain, passing south of a tract of Weiser State Forest that contains the Shamokin Reservoir and entering Mount Carmel Township.

The route descends the mountain with two eastbound lanes and one westbound lane. PA 54 becomes three lanes with a center left-turn lane and heads southeast through Natalie as Colonial Avenue. The route becomes an unnamed three-lane road with one eastbound lane and two westbound lanes as it descends a forested hill. The road turns south and passes west of a coal mine before narrowing to two lanes.

PA 54 heads past businesses and crosses PA 61 in Strong. Past this intersection, the route becomes Strong Connector and heads southeast into forested areas, curving south. The road turns west and then south, becoming Locust Gap Highway and crossing the Shamokin Valley Railroad before coming to an intersection with PA 901.

At this point, PA 901 turns south to form a concurrency with PA 54, passing through a forested gap in Mahanoy Mountain and running to the west of a Reading Blue Mountain and Northern Railroad line. The road curves southeast and passes through Locust Gap, heading east through more forests at this point. PA 901 splits from PA 54 south of Merrian by turning southeast, with PA 54 continuing east as an unnamed road through more wooded terrain.

=== Ashland to Nesquehoning ===
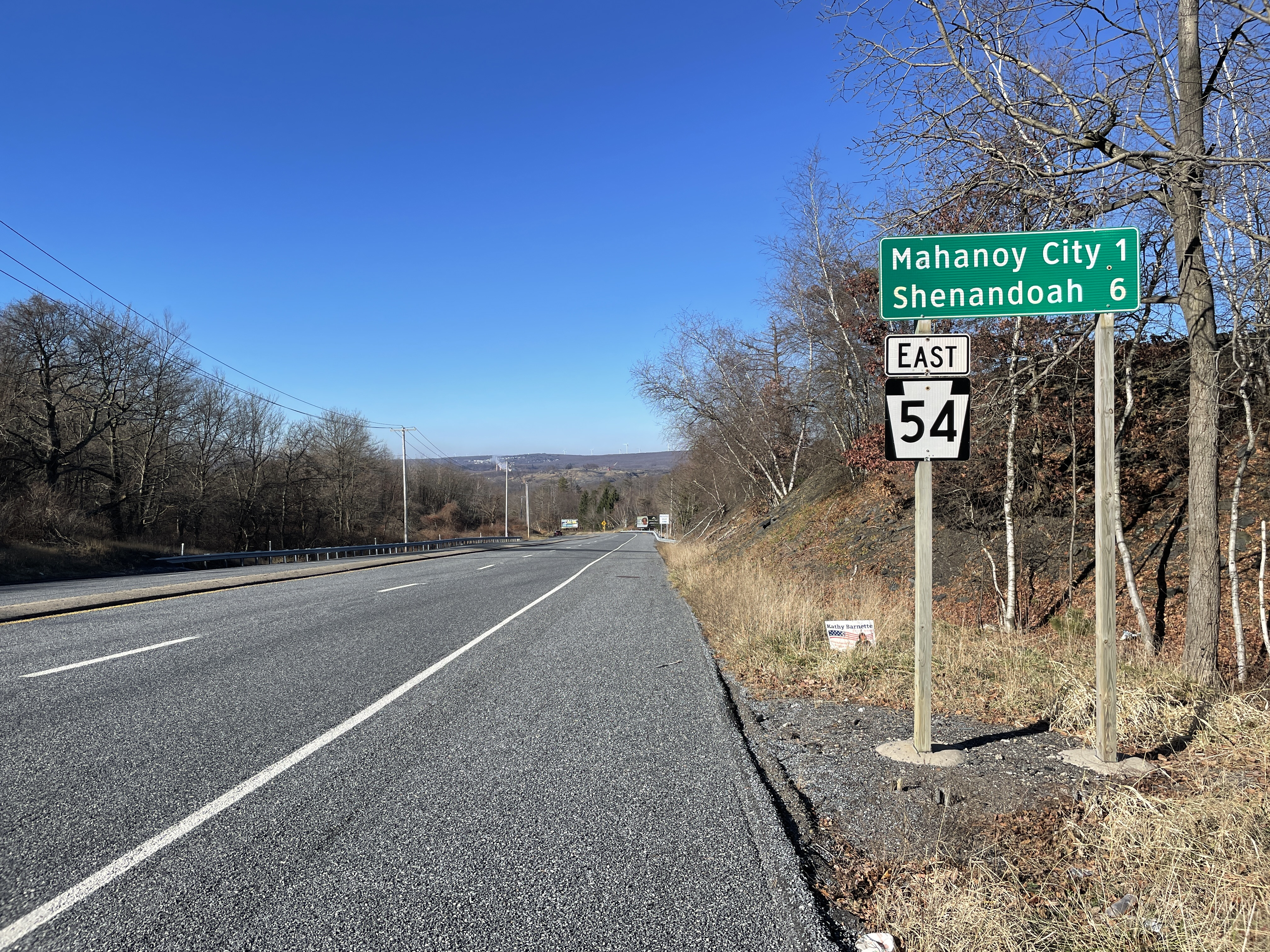
PA 54 westbound past I-81 in Mahanoy Township

PA 54 enters Conyngham Township in Columbia County, crossing the Reading Blue Mountain and Northern Railroad line before passing through Locustdale as Main Street.

While passing through Locustdale, the route crosses into Butler Township in Schuylkill County. The road runs through forests before it enters the borough of Ashland and becomes Centre Street. The route passes near commercial development before it reaches an intersection with PA 61.

At this point, PA 61 heads east concurrent with PA 54, and the two routes head past homes before running through the commercial downtown of Ashland. PA 61 splits to the south and PA 54 passes homes before crossing Mahanoy Creek and running past businesses, becoming East Centre Street and running between the creek to the north and industrial areas to the south. The route leaves Ashland for Butler Township again and heads into forested areas, turning northeast and crossing the Mahanoy Creek before passing through Big Mine Run. The road becomes West Mahanoy Avenue and winds east through forests to the north of the creek.

PA 54 enters the borough of Girardville as West Mahanoy Avenue and runs between woods to the north and residential areas to the south. The route becomes East Mahanoy Avenue and continues through developed areas, turning to the northeast. PA 54 heads back into Butler Township and runs through forests before passing through Connerton as Connerton Road. The route passes coal mines and heads into West Mahanoy Township.

The road runs through forested areas before reaching Lost Creek, where it turns south before making a turn east onto Lower Main Road. PA 54 runs through more woods and passes through West William Penn, where it becomes Upper Main Road and runs through more rural areas as it heads through Shaft. The route turns north and runs between coal mines before coming to Brownsville, where it turns east and enters the borough of Shenandoah.

Here, the road becomes West Centre Street and runs between Shenandoah Valley Junior Senior High School to the north and businesses to the south before becoming lined with homes. In the downtown area of Shenandoah, PA 54 crosses PA 924 and becomes East Centre Street, running through more residential areas with some businesses and industrial establishments. The route turns southeast and runs through forested areas, leaving Shenandoah for Mahanoy Township.

The road becomes Suffolk Road and turns south, passing near the communities of Ellen Gowan and Maple Hill before heading past coal mines as it passes west of the former site of the St. Nicholas Breaker, once claimed to be the largest coal breaker in the world. In Saint Nicholas, PA 54 turns east onto West Centre Street and heads past more coal mines as it runs north of a Reading Blue Mountain and Northern Railroad line. The road curves northeast and runs through wooded areas with some homes, passing over the railroad tracks.

The route heads into the borough of Mahanoy City as West Centre Street and turns east, passing businesses before running through residential areas. PA 54 heads into the commercial downtown of Mahanoy City and comes to an intersection with the southern terminus of PA 339, where the name changes to East Centre Street. The road leaves the downtown area and becomes lined with homes as it continues east through the borough.

The route leaves Mahanoy City for Mahanoy Township again, becoming four-lane divided Vulcan Hill Road and turning southeast into forested areas. PA 54 curves east and heads near some development, passing under a Reading Blue Mountain and Northern Railroad line before reaching a modified cloverleaf interchange with I-81.

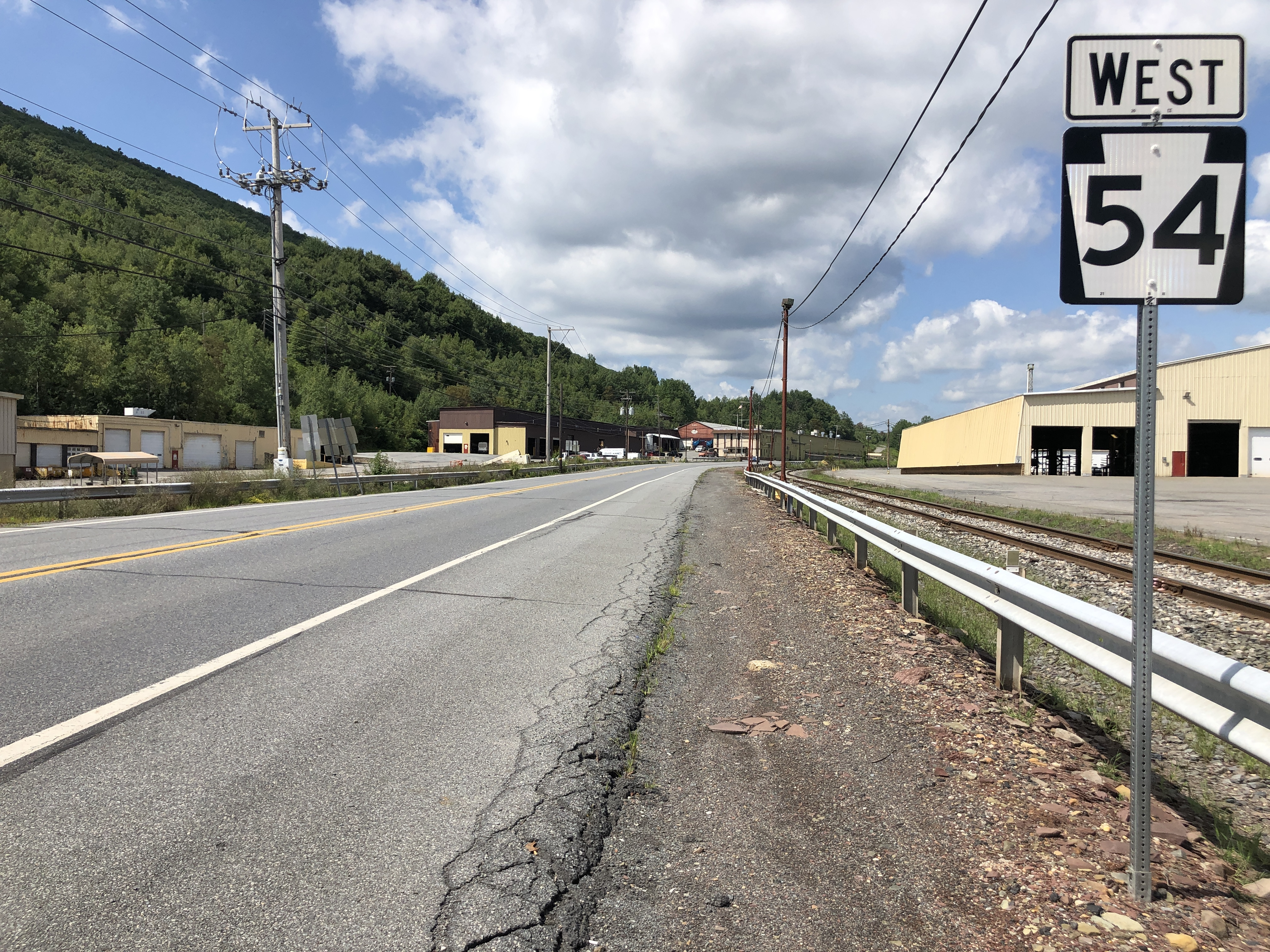
PA 54 westbound past US 209 in Nesquehoning

Following this interchange, the route narrows to a two-lane undivided road and heads northeast through forests, crossing into Ryan Township and becoming Barnesville Drive.

The road curves east and passes through residential areas in Hosensock. PA 54 heads east near more developed areas and passes through Park Crest, crossing the Reading Blue Mountain and Northern Railroad's Reading Division line and turning south-southeast to parallel the railroad tracks through wooded areas with some fields and development. The road and railroad tracks turn east, with the road crossing into Rush Township and becoming Pine Creek Drive. The route runs east-northeast through wooded areas with some farm fields and residences as it follows Pine Creek and the Reading Blue Mountain and Northern Railroad tracks, passing through Barnesville.

PA 54 heads east into forested areas and crosses the Little Schuylkill River in Mintzers, where the railroad tracks turn south away from the road to follow the river. The route becomes Mahanoy Avenue and heads into Hometown, heading north of the Hometown Farmers Market before running through residential areas.

The road turns northeast and comes to an intersection with PA 309 in a business area, where the name changes to Lafayette Avenue. PA 54 runs past more homes before it leaves Hometown, turning southeast as it passes through a mix of fields and development. The route turns northeast and becomes Hauto Highway, heading through forested areas as it passes to the northwest of Nesquehoning Mountain, with the Reading Blue Mountain and Northern Railroad's Reading Division line parallel to the north. Along this stretch, the road passes south of Greenwood Lake, Lake Hauto, and the Lake Hauto residential development.

While passing south of Lake Hauto, PA 54 enters the borough of Nesquehoning in Carbon County and becomes Stock Street, continuing through forested areas with some residential and commercial development to the south of the Reading Blue Mountain and Northern Railroad's Reading Division. Farther east, the route passes near industrial areas and becomes Industrial Complex, heading east. PA 54 comes to its eastern terminus at an intersection with US 209 at the western edge of the residential part of Nesquehoning.

== History ==
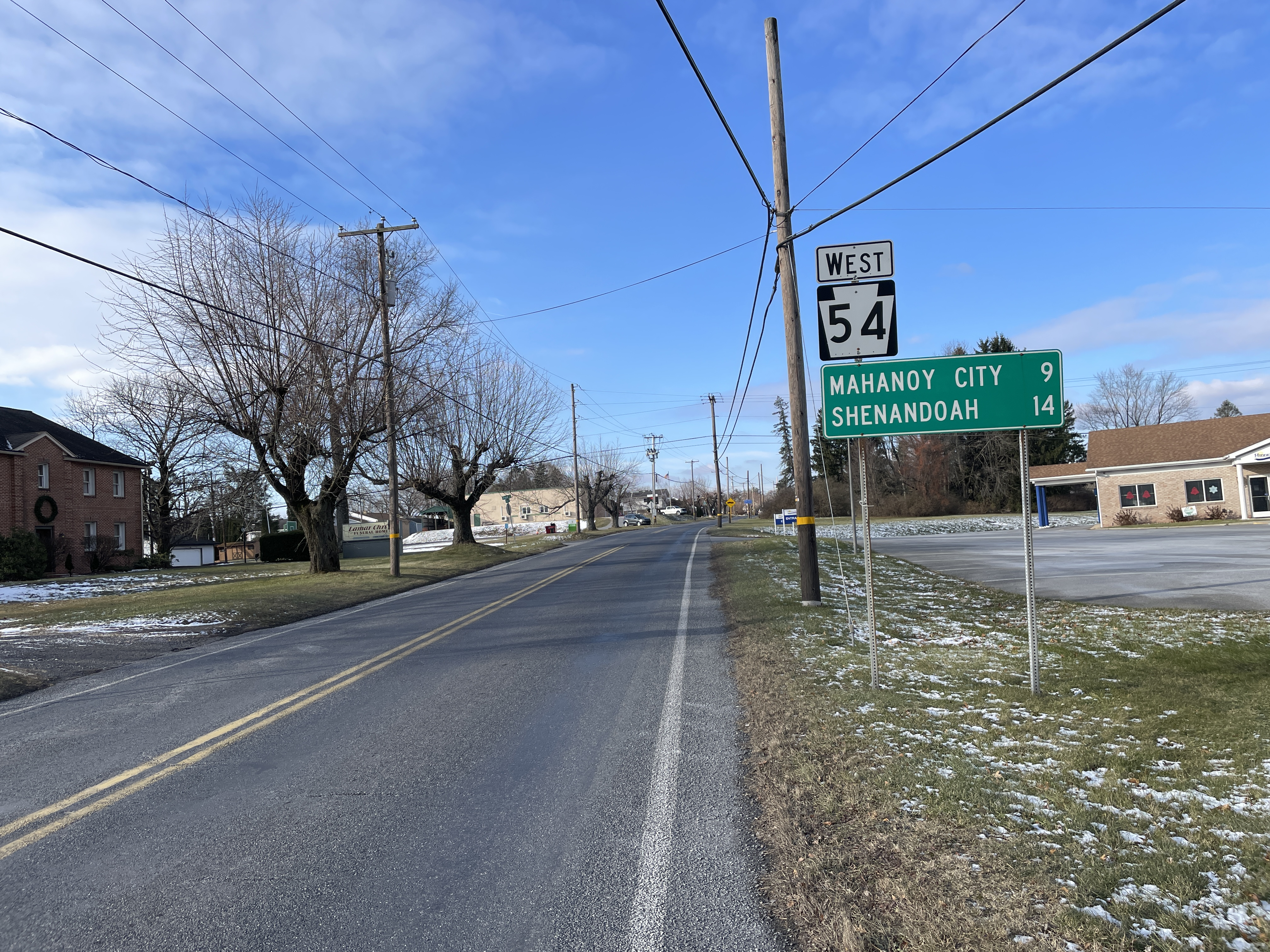
PA 54 westbound past PA 309 in Hometown

In 1961, the section of PA 54 between Mausdale and Ashland was replaced by PA 45 in order simplify route numbers by connecting the two segments of that route. On May 9, 1966, PA 54 was extended to its current eastern terminus by replacing PA 45 between Mausdale and Nesquehoning; this change was made to establish a direct connection to I-80.

Because of the underground coal mine fire in Centralia, the original branch of PA 54/PA 61, which went from Centralia to Ashland, has been permanently closed because the road has severely opened up and buckled extensively. This branch was repaired in 1983 for $500,000; then in 1992 it was deemed too expensive to repair again. In 1994, the branch was permanently closed.

PA 54 used to run concurrent with PA 61 through Centralia but was rerouted along PA 901 and three quadrant routes in 1999, completely bypassing Centralia. Nowadays, only PA 61 goes through Centralia while PA 54 now goes directly from Ashland to Mount Carmel Township along the aforementioned alignment via PA 901. The road signs for PA 54 were removed from Centralia several years ago.

PA 54 and PA 61 meet up again at an intersection just outside Mount Carmel.

== Major intersections ==
| County | Location | mi | km | Destinations | Notes |
|---|---|---|---|---|---|
| Lycoming | Clinton Township | 0.000 | 0.000 | US 15 / Elimsport Road (SR 2001) – Lewisburg, Allenwood, Williamsport | Western terminus of PA 54 |
| Lycoming | Montgomery | 2.992 | 4.815 | PA 405 north (Montgomery Street) to I-180 – Muncy | North end of PA 405 concurrency |
| Northumberland | Delaware Township | 4.080 | 6.566 | PA 405 south – Watsontown | South end of PA 405 concurrency |
| Northumberland | Delaware Township | 8.895– 8.977 | 14.315– 14.447 | I-180 – Milton, Williamsport | Exit 5 (I-180) |
| Northumberland | Turbotville | 10.972 | 17.658 | PA 44 north / SR 1011 (Main Street) – Turbotville, McEwensville | West end of PA 44 concurrency |
| Montour | Limestone Township | 13.498 | 21.723 | PA 44 south (Whitehall Road) / Cotner Road – Exchange | East end of PA 44 concurrency |
| Montour | Derry Township | 18.163 | 29.231 | PA 254 (Washingtonville Road / Broadway Road) – Millville, Milton | |
| Montour | Valley Township | 22.593– 22.898 | 36.360– 36.851 | I-80 – Bloomsburg, Milton | Exit 224 (I-80) |
| Montour | Valley Township | 23.775 | 38.262 | PA 642 west (Liberty Valley Road) – Milton | West end of PA 642 concurrency |
| Montour | Valley Township | 24.105 | 38.793 | PA 642 east (Jerseytown Road) – Jerseytown | East end of PA 642 concurrency |
| Montour | Danville | 25.544 | 41.109 | US 11 (Bloom Street) – Bloomsburg, Northumberland | |
| Northumberland | Ralpho Township | 34.531 | 55.572 | PA 487 (Valley Avenue) – Catawissa, Paxinos | |
| Northumberland | Mount Carmel Township | 42.565 | 68.502 | PA 61 – Mt. Carmel, Kulpmont | |
| Northumberland | Mount Carmel Township | 44.296 | 71.288 | PA 901 west – Shamokin | West end of PA 901 concurrency |
| Northumberland | Mount Carmel Township | 47.174 | 75.919 | PA 901 east (Fairgrounds Road) to I-81 / SR 2023 (Mt. Carmel-Merriam Highway) – Schuylkill Haven | East end of PA 901 concurrency |
| Columbia | No major junctions | | | | |
| Schuylkill | Ashland | 49.789 | 80.128 | PA 61 north (Memorial Drive) | West end of PA 61 concurrency |
| Schuylkill | Ashland | 50.772 | 81.710 | PA 61 south (Hoffman Boulevard) – Frackville, Pottsville | East end of PA 61 concurrency |
| Schuylkill | Shenandoah | 59.086 | 95.090 | PA 924 (Main Street) | |
| Schuylkill | Mahanoy City | 63.202 | 101.714 | PA 339 north / SR 1010 (Main Street) – Brandonville | Southern terminus of PA 339 |
| Schuylkill | Mahanoy Township | 65.144– 65.370 | 104.839– 105.203 | I-81 / SR 1008 (Morea Road) – Hazleton, Harrisburg, New Boston | Exit 131 (I-81) |
| Schuylkill | Rush Township | 72.429 | 116.563 | PA 309 (Claremont Avenue) to I-81 | |
| Carbon | Nesquehoning | 81.599 | 131.321 | US 209 (Catawissa Street / Market Street) – Jim Thorpe, Lansford, Tamaqua | Eastern terminus of PA 54 |
1.000 mi = 1.609 km; 1.000 km = 0.621 mi: Concurrency terminus
