= Valley City =

Valley City may refer to:

a place in the United States:

- Valley City, Illinois
- Valley City, Indiana
- Valley City, Missouri
- Valley City, North Dakota
- Valley City, Ohio
- Valley City Public School District
- Valley City Wetland Management District
- West Valley City, Utah

a university

- Valley City State University

a newspaper

- Valley City Times-Record

or

- USS Valley City (1859), a 190-ton steamer used by the Union Navy during the American Civil War.
