= Valley Center =

Valley Center may refer to:

== Places ==
- Valley Centre, Saskatchewan, Canada
- Valley Center, California, United States
- Valley Center, Kansas, United States
- Valley Center Township, Sedgwick County, Kansas, United States

== Organizations ==
- Clinton Valley Center, psychiatric hospital located in Michigan
- Great Valley Center, a nonprofit organization working to expand California's development growth

== See also ==
- Center Valley, Pennsylvania
- Valley River Center
