= Valley Township, Knox County, Nebraska =

Valley Township
- Township
- Location in Knox County
- Coordinates: 42°34′07″N 097°53′39″W
- Country: United States
- State: Nebraska
- County: Knox

Area
  - Total: 35.81 sq mi (92.76 km^{2})
  - Land: 35.81 sq mi (92.76 km^{2})
  - Water: 0 sq mi (0 km^{2}) 0%
- Elevation: 1,637 ft (499 m)

Population (2020)
  - Total: 148
  - Density: 4.13/sq mi (1.60/km^{2})
- GNIS feature ID: 0838302

Valley Township is one of thirty townships in Knox County, Nebraska, United States. The population was 148 at the 2020 census. A 2023 estimate placed the township's population at 146. The Village of Center lies within the Township.

== See also ==
- County government in Nebraska
