= Mausdale, Pennsylvania =

Unincorporated community in Pennsylvania, U.S.

Coordinates: 40°59′11″N 76°38′06″W

Mausdale is an unincorporated community in Montour County, in the U.S. state of Pennsylvania.

== History ==
Mausdale was named after the local Mau family of German heritage.
