= Valley Township, Montour County, Pennsylvania =

Township in Pennsylvania, United States

Coordinates: 41°01′00″N 76°37′59″W

- Township
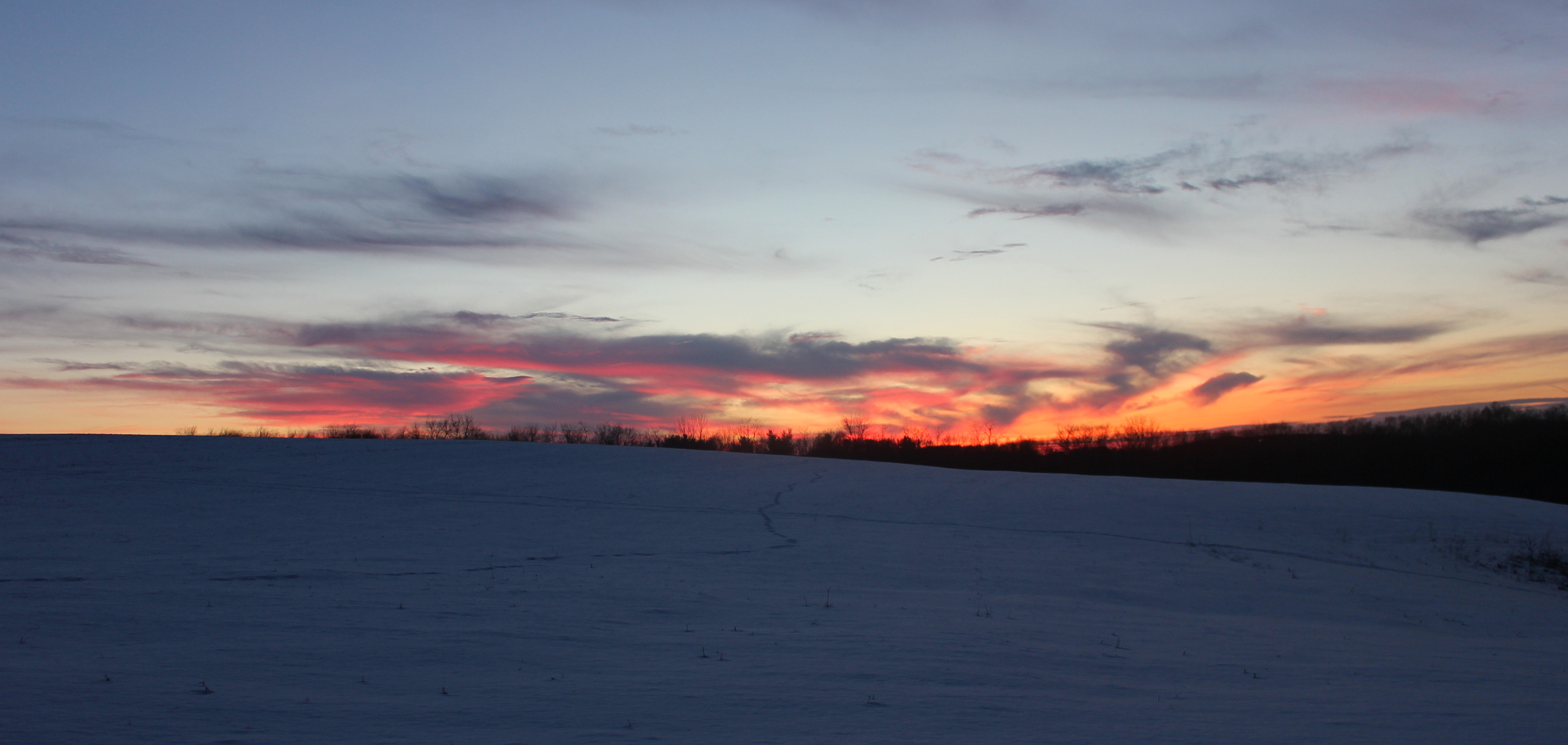
- Sunset at a field in Valley Township

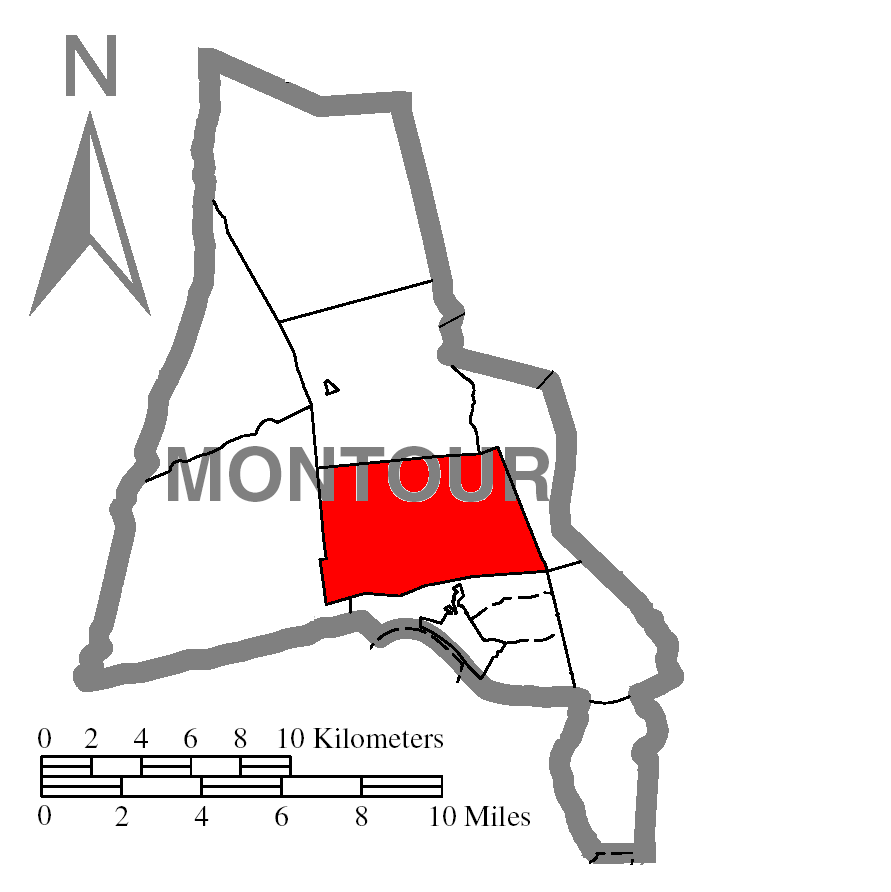
- Map of Montour County, Pennsylvania Highlighting Valley Township

- Map of Montour County, Pennsylvania
- Country: United States
- State: Pennsylvania
- County: Montour
- Settled: 1769
- Incorporated: 1839

Area
  - Total: 16.23 sq mi (42.03 km^{2})
  - Land: 16.19 sq mi (41.93 km^{2})
  - Water: 0.035 sq mi (0.09 km^{2})

Population (2020)
  - Total: 2,145 ▼
  - Estimate (2021): 2,132
  - Density: 134/sq mi (51.8/km^{2})
- FIPS code: 42-093-79552

Valley Township is a township in Montour County, Pennsylvania, United States.

== Geography ==
According to the United States Census Bureau, the township has a total area of 16.2 square miles (42.0 km^{2}), all of it land.

== Demographics ==
Historical population
Census	Pop.	Note	%±
2000	2,093		—
2010	2,158		3.1%
2020	2,145		−0.6%
2021 (est.)	2,132		−0.6%
U.S. Decennial Census

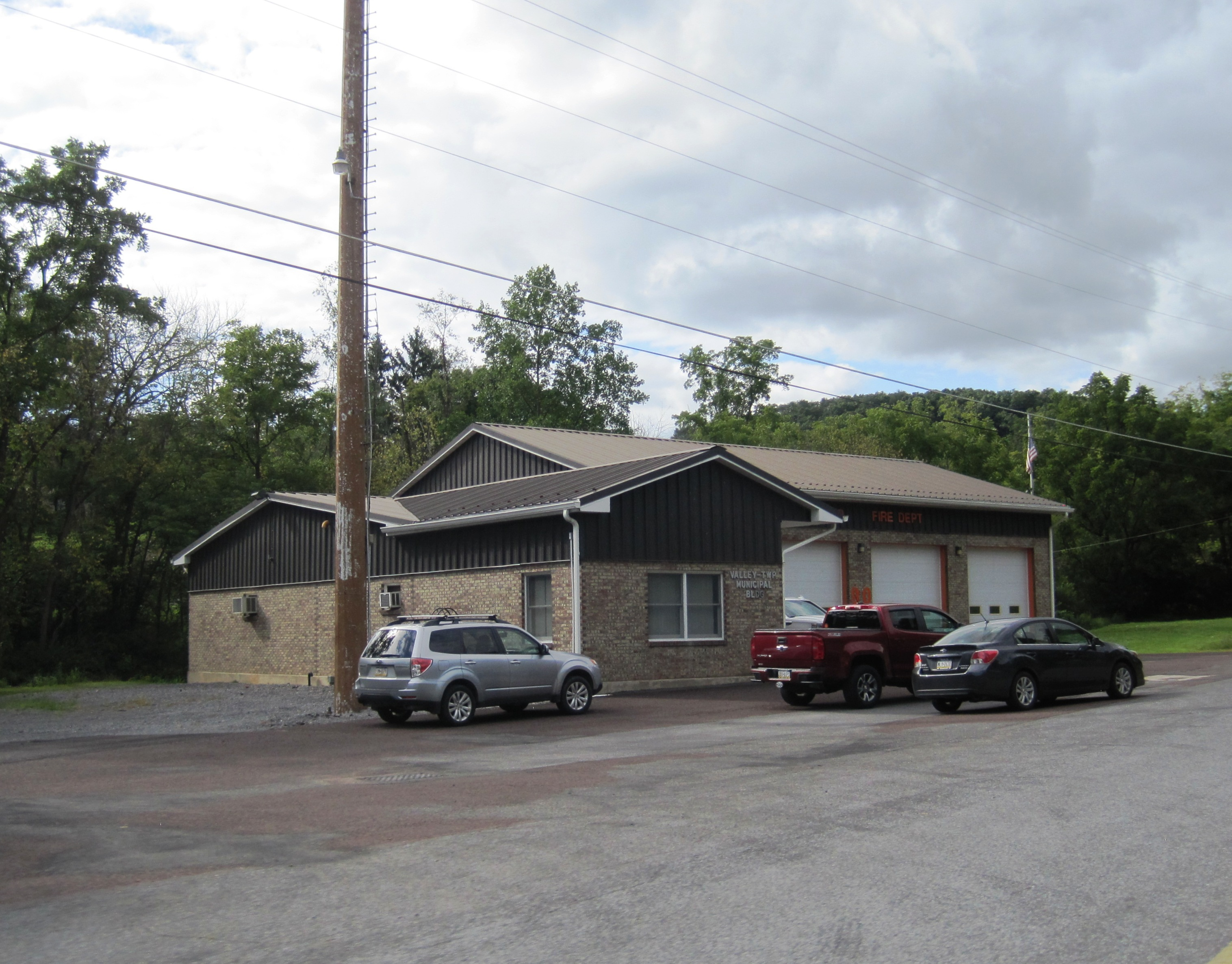
Valley Town Hall

As of the census of 2000, there were 2,093 people, 773 households, and 627 families residing in the township.

The population density was 129.0 inhabitants per square mile (49.8/km^{2}). There were 811 housing units at an average density of 50.0 per square mile (19.3/km^{2}).

The racial makeup of the township was 97.90% White, 0.62% African American, 0.05% Native American, 0.62% Asian, 0.33% from other races, and 0.48% from two or more races. Hispanic or Latino of any race were 0.67% of the population.

There were 773 households, out of which 34.9% had children under the age of eighteen living with them; 74.3% were married couples living together, 4.8% had a female householder with no husband present, and 18.8% were non-families. 14.7% of all households were made up of individuals, and 6.3% had someone living alone who was sixty-five years of age or older.

The average household size was 2.71 and the average family size was 3.02.

In the township the population was spread out, with 25.9% under the age of eighteen, 5.3% from eighteen to twenty-four, 28.4% from twenty-five to forty-four, 28.6% from forty-five to sixty-four, and 11.8% who were sixty-five years of age or older. The median age was forty years.

For every one hundred females, there were 104.4 males. For every one hundred females who were aged eighteen or older, there were 100.9 males.

The median income for a household in the township was $50,559, and the median income for a family was $56,016. Males had a median income of $36,167 compared with that of $26,518 for females.

The per capita income for the township was $21,458.

Roughly 4.5% of the population and 2.4% of families were living below the poverty line. Out of the total population, 5.3% of those who were under the age of eighteen and 3.2% of those who were aged sixty-five or older were living in poverty.
