= List of places in Pennsylvania: M =

This list of cities, towns, unincorporated communities, counties, and other recognized places in the U.S. state of Pennsylvania also includes information on the number and names of counties in which the place lies, and its lower and upper zip code bounds, if applicable.

Name of place	Number of counties	Principal county	Lower zip code	Upper zip code
Mabel	1	Schuylkill County	17921	
Mable Hill	1	Greene County	15327	
Mac	1	Bradford County		
Macada	1	Northampton County		
MacArthur	1	Beaver County	15001	
Macdonaldton	1	Somerset County	15530	
Macedonia	1	Bradford County	18848	
Macedonia	1	Juniata County	17059	
Mackeyville	1	Clinton County	17750	
Macungie	1	Lehigh County	18062	
Maddensville	1	Huntingdon County	17243	
Madera	1	Clearfield County	16661	
Madge	1	Elk County	16735	
Madison	1	Westmoreland County	15663	
Madison Township	1	Armstrong County		
Madison Township	1	Clarion County		
Madison Township	1	Columbia County		
Madison Township	1	Lackawanna County		
Madisonburg	1	Centre County	16852	
Madisonville	1	Lackawanna County	18444	
Madley	1	Bedford County	15534	
Magee	1	Warren County	16351	
Magill Heights	1	Allegheny County	15076	
Magnolia Gardens	1	Bucks County	19007	
Magnolia Hill	1	Bucks County		
Mahaffey	1	Clearfield County	15757	
Mahanoy Township	1	Schuylkill County		
Mahanoy City	1	Schuylkill County	17948	
Mahanoy Plane	1	Schuylkill County	17949	
Mahantango	1	Dauphin County		
Mahoning	1	Armstrong County	16259	
Mahoning	1	Fayette County		
Mahoning Township	1	Armstrong County		
Mahoning Township	1	Carbon County		
Mahoning Township	1	Lawrence County		
Mahoning Township	1	Montour County		
Mahoningtown	1	Lawrence County	16102	
Maiden Creek	1	Berks County	19606	
Maidencreek Township	1	Berks County		
Main Township	1	Columbia County		
Mainesburg	1	Tioga County	16932	
Mainland	1	Montgomery County	19451	
Mainsville	1	Franklin County	17257	
Mainville	1	Columbia County	17815	
Maitland	1	Mifflin County	17044	
Maizeville	1	Schuylkill County	17934	
Majeriks Corners	1	Erie County	16441	
Makefield Village	1	Bucks County	19067	
Malden Place	1	Washington County	15417	
Mall	1	Allegheny County	15146	
Malta	1	Northumberland County	17017	
Maltby	1	Luzerne County	18704	
Malvern	1	Chester County	19355	
Mammoth	1	Westmoreland County	15664	
Mamont	1	Westmoreland County	15632	
Manada Gap	1	Dauphin County	17112	
Manadahill	1	Dauphin County		
Manatawny	1	Berks County	19547	
Manayunk	1	Philadelphia County	19127	
Mance	1	Somerset County	15552	
Manchester	1	Allegheny County		
Manchester	1	York County	17345	
Manchester Township	1	Wayne County		
Manchester Township	1	York County		
Mandata	1	Northumberland County	17830	
Manhattan	1	Tioga County	16921	
Manheim	1	Lancaster County	17545	
Manheim Township	1	Lancaster County		
Manheim Township	1	York County		
Manifold	1	Washington County		
Manito	1	Westmoreland County	15650	
Manitto Haven	1	Westmoreland County	15681	
Mann Township	1	Bedford County		
Manns Choice	1	Bedford County	15550	
Mannsville	1	Perry County	17074	
Manoa	1	Delaware County	19083	
Manoa Heights	1	Delaware County	19083	
Manor	1	Indiana County	15765	
Manor Township	1	Armstrong County		
Manor Township	1	Lancaster County		
Manor	1	Westmoreland County	15665	
Manor Heights	1	Armstrong County		
Manor Hill	1	Huntingdon County	16652	
Manor Hills	1	Delaware County	19051	
Manor Park Terrace	1	Armstrong County	16226	
Manor Ridge	1	Lancaster County	17603	
Manorville	1	Armstrong County	16238	
Manown	1	Allegheny County	15063	
Mansfield	1	Tioga County	16933	
Mansville	1	Westmoreland County		
Mantua	1	Philadelphia County		
Mantz	1	Schuylkill County		
Mantzville	1	Schuylkill County	18211	
Manver	1	Indiana County		
Maple	1	Washington County		
Maple Beach	1	Bucks County	19007	
Maple Crest	1	Chester County	19341	
Maple Glen	1	Montgomery County	19002	
Maple Glen	1	Washington County	15417	
Maple Grove	1	Berks County	18011	
Maple Grove	1	Chester County	19363	
Maple Grove	1	Clarion County	16248	
Maple Grove	1	Columbia County		
Maple Grove	1	Fayette County		
Maple Grove	1	Wayne County		
Maple Grove Park	1	Berks County	19540	
Maple Hill	1	Lycoming County	17752	
Maple Hill	1	Schuylkill County	17976	
Maple Hill	1	Tioga County		
Maple Lake	1	Lackawanna County	18444	
Maple Manor	1	Luzerne County	18201	
Maple Point	1	Bucks County		
Maple Ridge	1	Somerset County	15935	
Maple Shade	1	Bucks County	19021	
Maple Shade	1	Venango County		
Maple Summit	1	Sullivan County		
Mapledale	1	Venango County	16323	
Mapleton	1	Huntingdon County	17052	
Mapleton Depot	1	Huntingdon County	17052	
Mapletown	1	Greene County	15338	
Maplewood	1	Bucks County	18901	
Maplewood	1	Wayne County	18436	
Maplewood Heights	1	Luzerne County	18612	
Maplewood Park	1	Delaware County	19018	
Maplewood Terrace	1	Westmoreland County	15601	
Marble	1	Clarion County	16334	
Marble City	1	Bedford County		
Marble Hall	1	Montgomery County	19444	
Marburg	1	York County		
Marchand	1	Indiana County	15758	
Marcus Hook	1	Delaware County	19061	
Marcy	1	Wyoming County		
Marengo	1	Centre County	16877	
Margaret	1	Armstrong County	16201	
Margaretta Furnace	1	York County	17406	
Margo Gardens	1	Bucks County	19007	
Marguerite	1	Westmoreland County	15650	
Maria	1	Bedford County		
Maria Furnace	1	Adams County		
Marianna	1	Washington County	15345	
Mariasville	1	Venango County	16373	
Marienville	1	Forest County	16239	
Marietta	1	Lancaster County	17547	
Marion	1	Franklin County	17235	
Marion Center	1	Indiana County	15759	
Marion Heights	1	Northumberland County	17832	
Marion Hill	1	Beaver County	15066	
Marion Township	1	Beaver County		
Marion Township	1	Berks County		
Marion Township	1	Butler County		
Marion Township	1	Centre County		
Mark Acres	1	Westmoreland County	15642	
Markelsville	1	Perry County	17074	
Markes	1	Franklin County	17236	
Market Square	1	Philadelphia County	19118	
Market Street	1	Chester County	19380	
Markham	1	Delaware County		
Markle	1	Westmoreland County	15613	
Marklesburg	1	Huntingdon County	16657	
Markleton	1	Somerset County	15551	
Markleysburg	1	Fayette County	15459	
Markton	1	Jefferson County	15764	
Markvue Manor	1	Westmoreland County	15642	
Marlboro	1	Chester County	19348	
Marlborough Township	1	Montgomery County		
Marlin	1	Schuylkill County	17951	
Marple	1	Delaware County		
Marple Township	1	Delaware County		
Marple Gardens	1	Delaware County	19008	
Marple Heights	1	Delaware County	19008	
Marple Summit Estates	1	Delaware County	19008	
Marple Township	1	Delaware County	19008	
Marple Woods	1	Delaware County	19008	
Marron	1	Clearfield County	16833	
Mars	1	Butler County	16046	
Marsh	1	Chester County	19520	
Marsh	1	Franklin County	17268	
Marshall Township	1	Allegheny County		
Marshall Heights	1	Indiana County	15716	
Marshall Hollow	1	Luzerne County		
Marshall Terrace	1	Delaware County	19061	
Marshalls Creek	1	Monroe County	18335	
Marshallton	1	Chester County	19380	
Marshallton	1	Northumberland County	17872	
Marshbrook	2	Lackawanna County	18414	
Marshbrook	2	Susquehanna County	18414	
Marshburg	1	McKean County	16738	
Marsh Creek	1	Tioga County		
Marsh Hill	1	Lycoming County	17771	
Marsh Run	1	York County	17070	
Marshlands	1	Tioga County	16921	
Marshview	1	Bradford County	18848	
Marshwood	1	Lackawanna County	18434	
Marsteller	1	Cambria County	15760	
Marstown	1	Schuylkill County	17963	
Martha Furnace	1	Centre County	16844	
Martic Forge	1	Lancaster County	17565	
Martic Township	1	Lancaster County		
Marticville	1	Lancaster County	17565	
Martin	1	Fayette County	15460	
Martin	1	York County		
Martindale	1	Cambria County	15946	
Martindale	1	Lancaster County	17549	
Martinsburg	1	Blair County	16662	
Martinsburg Junction	1	Blair County	16662	
Martins Corner	1	Chester County	19320	
Martins Creek	1	Northampton County	18063	
Martins Creek Junction	1	Northampton County		
Martins Crossroads	1	Juniata County		
Martins Ferry	1	Greene County	15338	
Martinsville	1	York County	17366	
Martintown	1	Indiana County		
Martzville	1	Columbia County	18603	
Marvel Gardens	1	Delaware County	19094	
Marvindale	1	McKean County	16749	
Marwood	1	Butler County	16023	
Mary D	1	Schuylkill County	17952	
Marysville	1	Bedford County		
Marysville	1	Centre County		
Marysville	1	Perry County	17053	
Marywood College	1	Lackawanna County	18509	
Mascot	1	Clearfield County		
Mascot	1	Lancaster County	17572	
Mason	1	Venango County		
Mason and Dixon	1	Franklin County	17225	
Masontown	1	Fayette County	15461	
Masseyburg	1	Huntingdon County	16669	
Mast Hope	1	Pike County	18435	
Masten	1	Lycoming County	17732	
Mastersonville	1	Lancaster County	17545	
Matamoras	1	Dauphin County	17032	
Matamoras	1	Pike County	18336	
Mateer	1	Armstrong County	16226	
Mather	1	Greene County	15346	
Mattawana	1	Mifflin County	17054	
Matternville	1	Centre County		
Matterstown	1	Dauphin County		
Matthews Run	1	Warren County	16371	
Mattie	1	Bedford County		
Mauch Chunk	1	Carbon County		
Mauk	1	Jefferson County		
Mausdale	1	Montour County	17821	
Maxatawny	1	Berks County	19538	
Maxatawny Township	1	Berks County		
Maxwell	1	Fayette County	15450	
Mayberry Township	1	Montour County		
Mayburg	1	Forest County	16347	
Mayes	1	Clearfield County		
Mayfair	1	Northumberland County		
Mayfair	1	Philadelphia County	19136	
Mayfield	1	Lackawanna County	18433	
Mayfield	1	Westmoreland County		
Mayfield East	1	York County	17405	
Mayport	1	Clarion County	16240	
Maysville	1	Armstrong County	15618	
Maysville	1	Mercer County	16125	
Maysville	1	Northumberland County	17866	
Maytown	1	Lancaster County	17550	
Maytown	1	York County	17339	
Mayview	1	Allegheny County	15017	
Mayville	1	Lawrence County	16105	
Maze	1	Juniata County	17094	
Mazeppa	1	Union County	17837	
McAdams	1	Washington County		
McAdoo	1	Schuylkill County	18237	
McAdoo Heights	1	Schuylkill County	18237	
McAlevys Fort	1	Huntingdon County	16652	
McAlisters Crossroads	1	Allegheny County		
McAlisterville	1	Juniata County	17049	
McAuley	1	Columbia County		
McBride	1	Butler County		
McCafferty Village	1	Delaware County		
McCalmont	1	Butler County		
McCalmont Township	1	Jefferson County		
McCance	1	Westmoreland County	15658	
McCandless Township	1	Allegheny County	15237	
McCartney	1	Clearfield County	16661	
McCartys Corner	1	Pike County		
McCaslin	1	Lawrence County		
McCauley	1	Clarion County		
McCauley	1	Clearfield County	16651	
McChesneytown	1	Westmoreland County	15650	
McChesneytown-Loyalhanna	1	Westmoreland County		
McClarran	1	Westmoreland County	15650	
McCleary	1	Beaver County		
McClellan	1	Dauphin County	17032	
McClellan Heights	1	York County	17403	
McClellandtown	1	Fayette County	15458	
McClintock	1	Venango County	16301	
McClure	1	Fayette County	15666	
McClure	1	Snyder County	17841	
McConnells Mill	1	Lawrence County		
McConnells Mill	1	Washington County	15317	
McConnellsburg	1	Fulton County	17233	
McConnellstown	1	Huntingdon County	16660	
McCormick	1	Indiana County		
McCoys Corners	1	Mercer County		
McCoysville	1	Juniata County	17058	
McCracken	1	Greene County	26033	
McCracken	1	Washington County		
McCrays	1	Forest County		
McCrea	1	Cumberland County	17241	
McCrea Furnace	1	Armstrong County		
McCullochs Mills	1	Juniata County	17035	
McCullough	1	Westmoreland County	15636	
McDermott	1	York County		
McDonald	2	Allegheny County	15057	
McDonald	2	Washington County	15057	
McDowell Corners	1	Mercer County	16127	
McElhattan	1	Clinton County	17748	
McEwensville	1	Northumberland County	17749	
McFann	1	Butler County		
McGarey	1	Jefferson County		
McGees	1	Clearfield County		
McGees Mills	1	Clearfield County	15757	
McGillstown	1	Lebanon County	17038	
McGovern	1	Washington County	15342	
McGrann	1	Armstrong County	16236	
McGregor	1	Armstrong County	16222	
McHaddon	1	Armstrong County		
McHenry Township	1	Lycoming County		
McIlhaney	1	Monroe County	18322	
McIntyre	1	Indiana County	15756	
McIntyre Township	1	Lycoming County		
McKean	1	Erie County	16426	
McKean Township	1	Erie County		
McKeansburg	1	Schuylkill County	17960	
McKee	1	Blair County	16637	
McKee	1	Perry County		
McKee Half Falls	1	Snyder County	17864	
McKees Rocks	1	Allegheny County	15136	
McKeesport	1	Allegheny County	15130	35
McKimm	1	Beaver County		
McKinley	1	Elk County		
McKinley	1	Montgomery County	19117	
McKinley Hill	1	Fayette County	15474	
McKinney	1	Franklin County	17232	
McKnight	1	Allegheny County	15237	
McKnight Village	1	Allegheny County	15237	
McKnightstown	1	Adams County	17343	
McKnightstown Station	1	Adams County		
McLallen Corners	1	Erie County		
McLane	1	Erie County	16426	
McLaughlin Corners	1	Crawford County		
McMichaels	1	Monroe County	18360	
McMinns Summit	1	Jefferson County		
McMurray	1	Washington County	15317	
McNees	1	Armstrong County		
McNett Township	1	Lycoming County		
McPherron	1	Clearfield County	15753	
McQueston Corners	1	Mercer County	16130	
McSherrystown	1	Adams County	17344	
McSparran	1	Lancaster County	17563	
McVeytown	1	Mifflin County	17051	
McVille	1	Armstrong County	16229	
McWilliams	1	Armstrong County	16242	
Mead Township	1	Warren County		
Meade Heights	1	Dauphin County		
Meadetown	1	York County		
Meadia Heights	1	Lancaster County	17602	
Meadow Gap	1	Huntingdon County	17243	
Meadow Lands	1	Washington County	15347	
Meadow Mill	1	Westmoreland County		
Meadow Wood	1	Beaver County	15001	
Meadowbrook	1	Fayette County	15401	
Meadowbrook	1	Montgomery County	19046	
Meadowbrook Manor	1	Chester County	19341	
Meadowdale	1	Somerset County		
Meadowleads	1	Washington County		
Meadowood	1	Butler County	16045	
Meadowview	1	Northumberland County	17860	
Meadowview Estates	1	Lancaster County	17540	
Meadville	1	Crawford County	16335	
Meadville Junction	1	Crawford County		
Mechanics Grove	1	Lancaster County	17566	
Mechanics Valley	1	Bucks County		
Mechanicsburg	1	Beaver County		
Mechanicsburg	1	Cumberland County	17055	
Mechanicsville	1	Bucks County	18934	
Mechanicsville	1	Clarion County	16214	
Mechanicsville	1	Lancaster County	17545	
Mechanicsville	1	Lehigh County	18104	
Mechanicsville	1	Montour County		
Mechanicsville	1	Philadelphia County		
Mechanicsville	1	Schuylkill County	17901	
Mechesneytown	1	Westmoreland County		
Meckesville	1	Carbon County	18210	
Mecks Corner	1	Perry County	17068	
Meckville	1	Berks County		
Media	1	Delaware County	19063	86
Medix Run	1	Elk County	15868	
Meeker	1	Luzerne County	18612	
Megargee	1	Chester County	19320	
Meharg	1	Butler County		
Mehoopany	1	Wyoming County	18629	
Mehoopany Township	1	Wyoming County		
Meiser	1	Snyder County	17842	
Meisertown	1	Monroe County		
Meiserville	1	Snyder County	17853	
Melcroft	1	Fayette County	15462	
Mellinger	1	Lancaster County		
Mellingertown	1	Westmoreland County	15666	
Mellotts Mill	1	Fulton County		
Melrose	1	Berks County	19606	
Melrose	1	Fayette County	15450	
Melrose	1	Susquehanna County	18847	
Melrose Park	1	Montgomery County	19012	
Menallen Township	1	Adams County		
Menallen Township	1	Fayette County		
Mench	1	Bedford County	15537	
Mendenhall	1	Chester County	19357	
Mendon	1	Westmoreland County	15679	
Menges Mill	1	Adams County		
Menges Mills	1	York County	17346	
Menno	1	Mifflin County	17004	
Menno Township	1	Mifflin County	17002	
Mentcle	1	Indiana County	15761	
Mercer	1	Mercer County	16137	
Mercer Township	1	Butler County		
Mercersburg	1	Franklin County	17236	
Mercersburg Junction	1	Franklin County	17236	
Mercur	1	Bradford County	18854	
Meredith	1	Armstrong County	16249	
Meredith	1	Jefferson County		
Meridian	1	Butler County	16001	
Merion	1	Montgomery County		
Merion Golf Manor	1	Delaware County	19003	
Merion Park	1	Montgomery County	19066	
Merion Square	1	Montgomery County	19035	
Merion Station	1	Montgomery County	19066	
Merion View	1	Montgomery County	19406	
Meriwether Farms	1	Chester County	19380	
Merlin	1	Chester County		
Merrian	1	Northumberland County	17851	
Merrill	1	Beaver County	15052	
Merrittstown	1	Fayette County	15463	
Merryall	1	Bradford County	18853	
Mertz Town	1	Carbon County		
Mertztown	1	Berks County	19539	
Merwin	1	Westmoreland County	15613	
Merwinsburg	1	Monroe County	18330	
Merwood	1	Delaware County	19083	
Meshoppen	1	Wyoming County	18630	
Meshoppen Township	1	Wyoming County		
Messiah College	1	Cumberland County	17027	
Messmore	1	Fayette County	15458	
Metal	1	Franklin County	17224	
Metal Township	1	Franklin County		
Metamora Station	1	Lehigh County		
Metcalf	1	Westmoreland County	15068	
Metzler	1	Somerset County		
Mexico	1	Juniata County	17056	
Mexico	1	Montour County		
Meyersdale	1	Somerset County	15552	
Meyersville	1	Lehigh County	18104	
Mickleys	1	Lehigh County	18052	
Mickleys Gardens	1	Lehigh County	18052	
Middle Churches	1	Westmoreland County	15666	
Middle City	1	Philadelphia County	19102	
Middle Creek	1	Snyder County	17812	17843
Middle Lancaster	1	Butler County	16037	
Middle Paxton Township	1	Dauphin County		
Middle Smithfield Township	1	Monroe County		
Middle Spring	1	Cumberland County	17257	
Middle Taylor Township	1	Cambria County		
Middleboro	1	Erie County		
Middleburg	1	Franklin County		
Middleburg	1	Luzerne County	18661	
Middleburg	1	Snyder County	17842	
Middlebury	1	Tioga County		
Middlebury Center	1	Tioga County	16935	
Middlebury Township	1	Tioga County		
Middlecreek Township	1	Snyder County		
Middlecreek Township	1	Somerset County		
Middleport	1	Schuylkill County	17953	
Middlesex	1	Cumberland County	17013	
Middlesex Township	1	Butler County		
Middlesex Township	1	Cumberland County		
Middleswarth	1	Snyder County	17842	
Middleton	1	Clearfield County	15757	
Middletown	1	Bradford County		
Middletown	1	Dauphin County	17057	
Middletown	1	Huntingdon County		
Middletown	1	McKean County		
Middletown	1	Northampton County	18017	
Middletown	1	Westmoreland County	15672	
Middletown Center	1	Susquehanna County	18818	
Middletown Heights	1	Delaware County	19063	
Middletown Township	1	Bucks County		
Middletown Township	1	Delaware County		
Middletown Township	1	Susquehanna County		
Midland	1	Beaver County	15059	
Midland	1	Washington County	15342	
Midmont	1	Elk County		
Midvale	1	Franklin County		
Midvale	1	Luzerne County	18705	
Midvale	1	Philadelphia County		
Midvalley	1	Columbia County	17888	
Midway	1	Adams County	17331	
Midway	1	Bucks County		
Midway	1	Lebanon County	17042	
Midway	1	Washington County	15060	
Midway	1	Westmoreland County	15601	
Midway Manor	1	Lehigh County	18109	
Miedel Hill	1	Westmoreland County		
Mifflin	1	Juniata County	17058	
Mifflin Cross Roads	1	Columbia County		
Mifflin Junction	1	Allegheny County	15236	
Mifflin Township	1	Columbia County		
Mifflin Township	1	Dauphin County		
Mifflin Township	1	Lycoming County		
Mifflinburg	1	Union County	17844	
Mifflintown	1	Juniata County	17059	
Mifflinville	1	Columbia County	18631	
Milan	1	Bradford County	18831	
Milanville	1	Wayne County	18443	
Milbell	1	Westmoreland County		
Mildred	1	Sullivan County	18632	
Mile Run	1	Northumberland County	17801	
Miles Township	1	Centre County		
Milesburg	1	Centre County	16853	
Milesville	1	Allegheny County	15063	
Milford	1	Pike County	18337	
Milford Manor	1	Bucks County	19067	
Milford Mills	1	Chester County		
Milford Park	1	Lehigh County		
Milford Square	1	Bucks County	18935	
Milford Township	1	Bucks County		
Milford Township	1	Juniata County		
Milford Township	1	Pike County		
Milford Township	1	Somerset County		
Milfred Terrace	1	Washington County	15348	
Militia Hill	1	Montgomery County	19034	
Mill City	1	Wyoming County	18414	
Mill Creek	1	Elk County		
Mill Creek	1	Huntingdon County	17060	
Mill Creek	1	Schuylkill County	17901	
Mill Creek	1	Tioga County		
Mill Creek Falls	1	Bucks County		
Mill Creek Township	1	Lycoming County		
Mill Creek Township	1	Mercer County		
Mill Grove	1	Columbia County	17820	
Mill Grove	1	Westmoreland County		
Mill Hall	1	Clinton County	17751	
Mill Lane	1	Chester County		
Mill Park	1	Montgomery County	19464	
Mill Road	1	Montgomery County		
Mill Run	1	Blair County	16001	
Mill Run	1	Clearfield County	15849	
Mill Run	1	Fayette County	15464	
Mill Run Junction	1	Fayette County		
Mill Village	1	Erie County	16427	
Millardsville	1	Lebanon County	17067	
Millbach	1	Lebanon County	17073	
Millbach Springs	1	Lebanon County	17073	
Millbank	1	Delaware County	19082	
Millbank	1	Westmoreland County	15658	
Millbourne	1	Delaware County	19082	
Millbrook	1	Centre County	16801	
Millbrook	1	Mercer County	16133	
Millburn	1	Mercer County		
Millcreek Township	1	Clarion County		
Millcreek Township	1	Erie County		
Millcreek Township	1	Lebanon County		
Milledgeville	1	Mercer County	16311	
Miller Heights	1	Northampton County	18017	
Miller Manor	1	Northampton County	18067	
Miller Run	1	Somerset County	15936	
Miller Shaft	1	Cambria County	15946	
Miller Township	1	Huntingdon County		
Miller Township	1	Perry County		
Millers	1	Crawford County	16403	
Millers	1	Northampton County		
Millers	1	Schuylkill County		
Millers Crossroads	1	Northumberland County		
Millers Station	1	Crawford County		
Millersburg	1	Dauphin County	17061	
Millersdale	1	Westmoreland County		
Millerstown	1	Allegheny County	15084	
Millerstown	1	Blair County	16662	
Millerstown	1	Clarion County	16334	
Millerstown	1	Perry County	17062	
Millersville	1	Lancaster County	17551	
Millerton	1	Tioga County	16936	
Millertown	1	Columbia County		
Millertown	1	Fayette County	15446	
Millheim	1	Centre County	16854	
Milligantown	1	Westmoreland County	15069	
Millikens	1	Clearfield County		
Millmont	1	Berks County		
Millmont	1	Union County	17845	
Millport	1	Lancaster County	17540	
Millport	1	Potter County	16748	
Millrift	1	Pike County	18340	
Mills	1	Potter County	16937	
Millsboro	1	Washington County	15348	
Millstone	1	Elk County		
Millstone Township	1	Elk County		
Milltown	1	Allegheny County		
Milltown	1	Bradford County	18840	
Milltown	1	Chester County	19380	
Milltown	1	Perry County		
Milltown	1	Warren County		
Millvale	1	Allegheny County	15209	
Millview	1	Sullivan County	18616	
Millville	1	Columbia County	17846	
Millway	1	Lancaster County	17543	
Millwood	1	Westmoreland County	15627	
Milmont	1	Delaware County		
Milmont Park	1	Delaware County	19033	
Milnesville	1	Luzerne County	18239	
Milnor	1	Franklin County	17225	
Milroy	1	Mifflin County	17063	
Milton	1	Armstrong County	16222	
Milton	1	Northumberland County	17847	
Milton Grove	1	Lancaster County	17552	
Milwaukee	1	Lackawanna County	18411	
Mina	1	Potter County	16915	
Mineral Point	1	Cambria County	15942	
Mineral Spring	1	Somerset County		
Mineral Springs	1	Clearfield County	16855	
Mineral Township	1	Venango County		
Miners Mills	1	Luzerne County		
Miners Village	1	Lebanon County	17016	
Minersville	1	Cambria County		
Minersville	1	Schuylkill County	17954	
Minerville	1	Bradford County		
Minesite	1	Lehigh County	18103	
Mingo	1	Montgomery County		
Mingoville	1	Centre County	16856	
Minisink Hills	1	Monroe County	18341	
Minister	1	Forest County		
Minnequa	1	Bradford County		
Minooka	1	Lackawanna County		
Mintzers	1	Schuylkill County		
Miola	1	Clarion County	16214	
Miquon	1	Montgomery County	19452	
Miquon Hills	1	Montgomery County	19428	
Misertown	1	Monroe County	18332	
Mishler Corners	1	Erie County		
Mission Hill	1	Lancaster County	17601	
Mitchell Creek	1	Tioga County		
Mitchell Park	1	Montgomery County	19040	
Mitchells	1	Clearfield County		
Mix Run	1	Cameron County	15832	
Mixtown	1	Tioga County		
Mocanaqua	1	Luzerne County	18655	
Mocking Bird Hill	1	Westmoreland County	15642	
Model Village	1	Delaware County	19061	
Modena	1	Chester County	19358	
Moffitt Sterling	1	Greene County		
Moffitty	1	Greene County	15327	
Mogees	1	Montgomery County	19401	
Mogees Station	1	Montgomery County		
Mogeetown	1	Montgomery County		
Mohns Hill	1	Berks County	19608	
Mohnton	1	Berks County	19540	
Mohrsville	1	Berks County	19541	
Moline	1	Westmoreland County		
Molino	1	Schuylkill County	17961	
Mollenauer	1	Allegheny County	15102	
Molltown	1	Berks County	19522	
Monaca	1	Beaver County	15061	
Monaghan Township	1	York County		
Monarch	1	Fayette County	15431	
Monessen	1	Westmoreland County	15062	
Mongul	1	Franklin County	17257	
Moninger	1	Washington County	15342	
Moniteau	1	Butler County	16061	
Monocacy	1	Berks County		
Monocacy Station	1	Berks County	19542	
Monongahela	1	Washington County	15063	
Monongahela Junction	1	Allegheny County	15110	
Monongahela Township	1	Greene County		
Monroe	1	Bradford County	18832	
Monroe	1	Bucks County	18930	
Monroe	1	Butler County		
Monroe	1	Clarion County	16232	
Monroe Furnace	1	Huntingdon County		
Monroe Heights	1	Allegheny County	15146	
Monroe Township	1	Bedford County		
Monroe Township	1	Bradford County		
Monroe Township	1	Clarion County		
Monroe Township	1	Cumberland County		
Monroe Township	1	Juniata County		
Monroe Township	1	Snyder County		
Monroe Township	1	Wyoming County		
Monroeton	1	Bradford County	18832	
Monroeville	1	Allegheny County	15146	
Mont Alto	1	Franklin County	17237	
Mont Clare	1	Montgomery County	19453	
Montandon	1	Northumberland County	17850	
Montdale	1	Lackawanna County	18447	
Montebello	1	Perry County	17020	
Montello	1	Berks County	19608	
Monterey	1	Berks County	19530	
Monterey	1	Franklin County	17214	
Monterey	1	Lancaster County	17540	
Montgomery	1	Lycoming County	17752	
Montgomery Ferry	1	Perry County	17074	
Montgomery Square	1	Montgomery County	18936	
Montgomery Township	1	Franklin County		
Montgomery Township	1	Indiana County		
Montgomery Township	1	Montgomery County		
Montgomeryville	1	Armstrong County		
Montgomeryville	1	Montgomery County	18936	
Montmorenci	1	Elk County	15853	
Montour	1	Allegheny County	15244	
Montour Junction	1	Allegheny County	15108	
Montour Township	1	Columbia County		
Montoursville	1	Lycoming County	17754	
Montrose	1	Berks County	19607	
Montrose	1	Susquehanna County	18801	
Montrose Hill	1	Allegheny County	15238	
Montsera	1	Cumberland County	17013	
Monument	1	Centre County	16822	
Monvue	1	Fayette County	15461	
Moon	1	Allegheny County	15108	
Moon Crest	1	Allegheny County	15108	
Moon Run	1	Allegheny County	15136	
Moon Township	1	Allegheny County		
Moonstown	1	Lebanon County	17073	
Moore	1	Delaware County		
Moore Township	1	Northampton County		
Mooredale	1	Cumberland County	17013	
Moores Corners	1	Butler County	16057	
Mooresburg	1	Montour County	17821	
Moorestown	1	Northampton County	18014	
Moorhead	1	Erie County		
Moorheadville	1	Erie County	16428	
Moors Mill	1	Cumberland County		
Moosehead	1	Luzerne County		
Moosic	1	Lackawanna County	18507	
Morado	1	Beaver County	15010	
Morann	1	Clearfield County	16663	
Moravia	1	Lawrence County	16157	
Moravian	1	Northampton County	18018	
Mordansville	1	Columbia County	17815	
Morea	1	Schuylkill County		
Morea Colliery	1	Schuylkill County	17948	
Morea-New Boston	1	Schuylkill County		
Moreland	1	Lycoming County	17756	
Moreland Farms	1	Montgomery County	19040	
Moreland Manor	1	Montgomery County	19040	
Moreland Township	1	Lycoming County		
Morewood	1	Montgomery County	19040	
Morewood	1	Westmoreland County		
Morford	1	Greene County		
Morgan	1	Allegheny County	15064	
Morgan	1	Fayette County	15425	15456
Morgan Hill	1	Allegheny County	15031	
Morgan Township	1	Greene County		
Morgans Hill	1	Northampton County	18042	
Morgans Land	1	Clearfield County		
Morgantown	1	Berks County	19543	
Morganza	1	Washington County		
Morningside	1	Allegheny County		
Morrell	1	Fayette County	15431	
Morrellville	1	Cambria County		
Morris	1	Tioga County	16938	
Morris Crossroads	1	Fayette County	15451	
Morris Run	1	Tioga County	16939	
Morris Township	1	Clearfield County		
Morris Township	1	Greene County		
Morris Township	1	Huntingdon County		
Morris Township	1	Tioga County		
Morris Township	1	Washington County		
Morrisdale	1	Clearfield County	16858	
Morrisville	1	Bucks County	19067	
Morrisville	1	Greene County	15370	
Morrows Corner	1	Armstrong County	16210	
Morstein	1	Chester County	19380	
Morton	1	Delaware County	19070	
Mortonville	1	Chester County	19320	
Morwood	1	Montgomery County	18969	
Morysville	1	Berks County	19512	
Moscow	1	Lackawanna County	18444	
Moselem	1	Berks County	19526	
Moselem Springs	1	Berks County	19522	
Mosgrove	1	Armstrong County	16259	
Moshannon	1	Cambria County		
Moshannon	1	Centre County	16859	
Mosherville	1	Bradford County	16925	
Mosiertown	1	Crawford County	16433	
Moss Creek	1	Cambria County		
Moss Creek Junction	1	Cambria County		
Moss Plan	1	Beaver County	15074	
Mosserville	1	Lehigh County	18066	
Mossville	1	Luzerne County		
Mostoller	1	Somerset County	15563	
Mottarns Mill	1	Indiana County		
Moudy Hill	1	Cambria County	15946	
Moulstown	1	York County	17331	
Mount Aetna	1	Berks County	19544	
Mount Air	1	Lawrence County		
Mount Airy	1	Berks County		
Mount Airy	1	Clarion County	16255	
Mount Airy	1	Lancaster County	17557	17578
Mount Airy	1	Philadelphia County	19119	
Mount Airy Terrace	1	Luzerne County	18708	
Mount Allen	1	Cumberland County	17055	
Mount Alton	1	McKean County	16738	
Mount Ararat	1	Lebanon County		
Mount Bethel	1	Northampton County	18343	
Mount Braddock	1	Fayette County	15465	
Mount Carbon	1	Schuylkill County	17901	
Mount Carmel	1	Greene County		
Mount Carmel	1	Northumberland County	17851	
Mount Carmel Junction	1	Northumberland County		
Mount Carmel Township	1	Northumberland County		
Mount Chestnut	1	Butler County	16002	
Mount Chestnut Springs	1	Butler County	16001	
Mount Cobb	1	Lackawanna County	18436	
Mount Dallas	1	Bedford County		
Mount Eagle	1	Centre County	16841	
Mount Etna	1	Blair County	16693	
Mount Gretna	1	Lebanon County	17064	
Mount Gretna Heights	1	Lebanon County	17064	
Mount Herman	1	Washington County		
Mount Holly Springs	1	Cumberland County	17065	
Mount Hope	1	Adams County	17320	
Mount Hope	1	Clearfield County		
Mount Hope	1	Crawford County		
Mount Hope	1	Fayette County		
Mount Hope	1	Lancaster County	17545	
Mount Independence	1	Fayette County	15456	
Mount Jackson	1	Lawrence County	16101	
Mount Jewett	1	McKean County	16740	
Mount Joy	1	Clearfield County	16830	
Mount Joy	1	Lancaster County	17552	
Mount Joy	1	Westmoreland County	15666	
Mount Joy Township	1	Adams County		
Mount Joy Township	1	Lancaster County		
Mount Laffee	1	Schuylkill County	17901	
Mount Laurel	1	Luzerne County	18201	
Mount Lebanon	1	Allegheny County	15228	
Mount Misery	1	Adams County	17350	
Mount Morris	1	Greene County	15349	
Mount Nebo	1	Allegheny County	15143	
Mount Nebo	1	Lancaster County	17565	
Mount Nebo	1	Westmoreland County		
Mount Oliver	1	Allegheny County	15210	
Mount Patrick	1	Perry County	17045	
Mount Penn	1	Berks County	19606	
Mount Pleasant	1	Adams County	17331	
Mount Pleasant	1	Berks County	19506	
Mount Pleasant	1	Bucks County		
Mount Pleasant	1	Delaware County	19087	
Mount Pleasant	1	Juniata County	17059	
Mount Pleasant	1	Lancaster County		
Mount Pleasant	1	Lebanon County	17042	
Mount Pleasant	1	Mifflin County	17063	
Mount Pleasant	1	Northampton County	18013	
Mount Pleasant	1	Northumberland County		
Mount Pleasant	1	Perry County	17006	
Mount Pleasant	1	Schuylkill County	17901	
Mount Pleasant	1	Tioga County	16938	
Mount Pleasant	1	York County	17019	
Mount Pleasant Mills	1	Snyder County	17853	
Mount Pleasant Township	1	Adams County		
Mount Pleasant Township	1	Columbia County		
Mount Pleasant Township	1	Washington County		
Mount Pleasant Township	1	Wayne County		
Mount Pleasant	1	Westmoreland County	15666	
Mount Pleasant Township	1	Westmoreland County		
Mount Pocono	1	Monroe County	18344	
Mount Rock	1	Cumberland County	17013	
Mount Rock	1	Franklin County	17257	
Mount Rock	1	Mifflin County	17044	
Mount Royal	1	York County	17315	
Mount Sterling	1	Fayette County	15461	
Mount Tabor	1	Adams County	17324	
Mount Tabor	1	Armstrong County		
Mount Top	1	York County		
Mount Troy	1	Allegheny County	15212	
Mount Union	1	Franklin County	17222	
Mount Union	1	Huntingdon County	17066	
Mount Vernon	1	Allegheny County	15135	
Mount Vernon	1	Chester County	19363	
Mount Vernon	1	Lancaster County	17527	
Mount Vernon	1	Westmoreland County		
Mount Washington	1	Allegheny County	15211	
Mount Washington	1	Beaver County	15010	
Mount Washington	1	Fayette County	15437	
Mount Wilson	1	Lebanon County	17042	
Mount Wolf	1	York County	17347	
Mount Zion	1	Cumberland County	17055	
Mount Zion	1	Lebanon County	17042	
Mount Zion	1	Luzerne County	18643	
Mount Zion	1	Monroe County	18301	
Mount Zion	1	York County	17402	
Mountain Green	1	Franklin County		
Mountain Grove	1	Luzerne County	17815	
Mountain Lake	1	Bradford County	18848	
Mountain Park	1	Luzerne County		
Mountain Top	1	Luzerne County	18707	
Mountaindale	1	Cambria County	16639	
Mountainhome	1	Monroe County	18342	
Mountaintop	1	Lancaster County		
Mountainville	1	Lehigh County		
Mountville	1	Lancaster County	17554	
Moween	1	Westmoreland County	15681	
Mowersville	1	Franklin County	17257	
Mowry	1	Clearfield County		
Mowry	1	Schuylkill County	17921	
Moxham	1	Cambria County		
Moyer	1	Fayette County	15425	
Moyers	1	Schuylkill County		
Moyers Grove	1	Luzerne County		
Moylan	1	Delaware County	19065	
Mozart	1	Bucks County	18925	
Mud Run	1	Carbon County		
Muddy Creek Forks	1	York County	17302	
Muddy Creek Township	1	Butler County		
Muff	1	Armstrong County		
Muhlenberg	1	Luzerne County	18621	
Muhlenberg Park	1	Berks County	19605	
Muhlenberg Township	1	Berks County	19605	
Muir	1	Schuylkill County	17957	
Mullertown	1	York County	17331	
Mumbauersville	1	Bucks County	18073	
Mummasburg	1	Adams County	17325	
Muncy	1	Lycoming County	17756	
Muncy Creek Township	1	Lycoming County		
Muncy Township	1	Lycoming County		
Muncy Valley	1	Sullivan County	17758	
Munderf	1	Jefferson County	15825	
Mundys Corner	1	Cambria County	15909	
Munhall	1	Allegheny County	15120	
Munhall Terrace	1	Allegheny County	15122	
Munntown	1	Washington County	15330	
Munson	1	Clearfield County	16860	
Munster	1	Cambria County	15940	
Munster Township	1	Cambria County		
Murdock	1	Somerset County	15501	
Murdocksville	3	Allegheny County	15026	
Murdocksville	3	Beaver County	15026	
Murdocksville	3	Washington County	15026	
Murphy Siding	1	Fayette County	15425	
Murray	1	Lebanon County		
Murray	1	Sullivan County		
Murraysville	1	Westmoreland County		
Murrell	1	Lancaster County	17522	
Murrinsville	1	Butler County	16020	
Murry Hill	1	Washington County	15317	
Murrysville	1	Westmoreland County	15668	
Muse	1	Washington County	15350	
Musselman Grove	1	Blair County		
Musser	1	Centre County		
Mustard	1	Allegheny County	15037	
Mutual	1	Westmoreland County	15601	
Muzette	1	Forest County		
Myersbrook	1	Westmoreland County		
Myersburg	1	Bradford County	18854	
Myerstown	1	Lebanon County	17067	
Mylo Park	1	Cambria County	15931	
Myobeach	1	Wyoming County	18630	
Myoma	1	Butler County	16046	
Myrtle	1	McKean County	14721	
Mystic	1	Erie County	16403	
Mystic Park	1	Crawford County		
