= Shimersville, Northampton County, Pennsylvania =

Former village in Pennsylvania, US

Shimersville
- Former Village
- Etymology: Shimers' Village
- Location within Pennsylvania Location within the United States
- Coordinates: 40.617222°N 75.334444°W
- Country: United States
- State: Pennsylvania
- County: Northampton
- First settled: 1725
- Absorbed into Bethlehem: 1920
- Founder: Jacob Sheimer

Shimersville is a former village in Northampton County, Pennsylvania. It was the first inhabited settlement in what is now Lower Saucon Township. First settled around 1725 by Matthew Riegle and Jacob Sheimer, the settlement was established near the mouth of the Saucon Creek. In 1920, however, the village was declining and was annexed and absorbed into Bethlehem, Pennsylvania.

== History ==
=== 18th century ===
In 1737, Nathaniel Irish created a grist mill in the settlement. In 1743, the Moravians of Bethlehem petitioned Bucks County to create a county road from Bethlehem to the growing settlement which was the site of a ferry across the Lehigh River. Throughout the 18th century several families moved near the mill along the creek.

=== 19th century ===
In 1801, Jacob Shimer, a descendant of Jacob Sheimer, erected a stone house near the mouth of the creek and the village bore his name. In 1812, he and other family members purchased the Irish grist mill and erected an oil mill to its south. The family established other businesses within the area, including a fulling mill. After Jacob's passing in 1837, his son George took over the family business, but moved them to Allentown by 1872.

By 1851, the village consisted of a general store, tavern, and a small cluster of family homes. The village maintained a limited incorporated government, operating a public school and raising taxes for its operation. Shimersville operated as the last stop to purchase supplies before entering South Bethlehem.

=== 20th century ===
In 1920, the village was declining and was purchased in full by Bethlehem Steel, then the second-largest steel manufacturer in the world, prior to the end of the decade to expand its Bethlehem Works facility, which along with Hottlesville, Altonah, and Macada, was annexed to Bethlehem, Pennsylvania.
