= Merrittstown =

Merrittstown may refer to:

- Merrittstown, Ohio
- Merrittstown, Pennsylvania
