= Altonah, Pennsylvania =

Former village in Northampton County, Pennsylvania, US

Altonah
- Former Village
- Etymology: all too near
- Location within Pennsylvania Location within the United States
- Coordinates: 40.65682903045693°N 75.35622773495402°W
- Country: United States
- State: Pennsylvania
- County: Northampton
- Absorbed into Bethlehem: 1904–1920

Altonah was a former village in Northampton County, Pennsylvania located one mile north of the then borders of Bethlehem, Pennsylvania. The village's name is a corruption of the German phrase "all zu nähe", translated as "all too near", referencing its close proximity to Bethlehem and the fact that the village was inhabited by German settlers.

== History ==
=== 19th century ===
On September 5, 1832 Prince Maximilian of Wied-Neuwied rode through Altonah during his travels from Mauch Chunk to Nazareth and noted that the village used to have a large Moravian population.

In 1877, the village consisted of 16 dwellings.

In 1895, a post office was opened near where the village was located. The post office was initially going to be named Altonah, in reference to the village, but was instead named Macada and become the center of a village in its own right.

=== 20th century ===
Altonah was annexed by Bethlehem, Pennsylvania during its consolidation effort between 1904 and 1920 along with Macada, Hottlesville, and Shimersville were similarly annexed. The only remaining reference to the village is Altona Road in Bethlehem.
