= Marshall Heights =

Marshall Heights may refer to:

- Marshall Heights (Washington, D.C.), US
- Marshall Heights, Pennsylvania, a place in Pennsylvania, US
- Marshall Heights, West Virginia, US, near Greens Run (Buffalo Creek tributary)
- Marshall Heights Housing Area, a United States Army installation in Germany
