= Manatawny =

Manatawny may refer to the following in the U.S. state of Pennsylvania:

- Manatawny, Pennsylvania, a community in Berks County
- Manatawny Creek, a tributary of the Schuylkill River
