= Pleasantville, Pennsylvania =

Pleasantville is the name of three places in the U.S. state of Pennsylvania:

- Pleasantville, Bedford County, Pennsylvania
- Pleasantville, Berks County, Pennsylvania
- Pleasantville, Venango County, Pennsylvania
