= Sand Patch Grade =

Section of railroad in Pennsylvania and Maryland

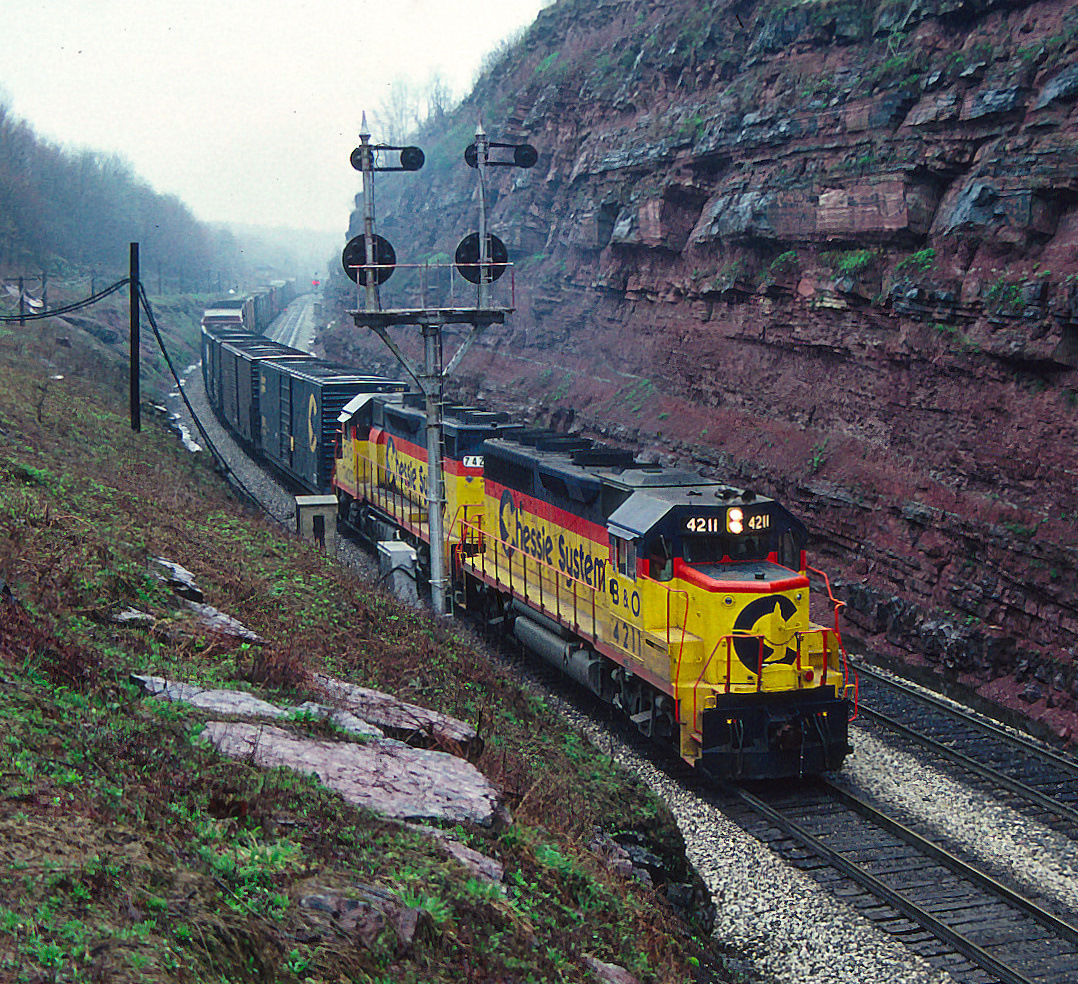
A B&O (Chessie System) EMD GP40-2 enters the Sand Patch Tunnel eastbound in 1987.

Sand Patch Grade is an approximately 100-mile-long (160 km) section of railroad track known for its steep grades and curves through the Allegheny Mountains of Pennsylvania and western Maryland. Dropping over 1,000 feet (300 m) in about 20 miles (32 km) and with grades as much as 2%, Sand Patch Grade is one of the steepest railroad grades on the East Coast.

== History ==
Sand Patch Grade was originally built by the Pittsburgh & Connellsville Railroad (P&C) to connect Pittsburgh and Connellsville, Pennsylvania, with an extension authorized to Cumberland, Maryland, in 1853. The extension required a crossing of the Allegheny Mountains via a 4,777-foot-long (1,456 m) tunnel, which was constructed between 1854 and 1871. At the time, this project was one of the longest tunnels in the United States. It was designed for two tracks but, due to difficult terrain and inconsistent geology, the plan was revised to one track. Work on the tunnel was beset with problems—embezzlement, contractor bankruptcy, the Civil War, and political battles—so that the tunnel was only worked on for 8 of the 17 years it was technically under construction. Ventilation in the tunnel was a problem; four vertical shafts had been bored during construction, and three were finished to provide air circulation. By 1900, increased traffic on the line necessitated a tunnel with higher capacity.

A new 4,475-foot-long (1,364 m) double-track tunnel on a shallower grade and improved alignment was constructed between 1911 and 1913. It has two concrete-lined vertical ventilation shafts to supply air. The original one-track tunnel was retained for a time after the two-track tunnel was completed, temporarily providing three tracks at that point on the line. The old tunnel was abandoned in 1917 and is now flooded and collapsed in places.

In 2001, the "SA" Tower near the western portal of the tunnel was decommissioned and demolished.

The P&C became the Pittsburgh Division of the Baltimore & Ohio Railroad (B&O), which became a component of the Chessie System in 1972, then was merged into CSX in 1987. The line is now part of the Keystone Subdivision, an East–West main line operated by CSX Transportation. Passengers can ride over Sand Patch Grade on Amtrak's Chicago–Washington train, the bi-directional Floridian.

Mance, Pennsylvania, in Northampton Township along the Sand Patch Grade, is a popular spot for railfans and photographers due to the horseshoe curve located there, as well as the scenic backdrop provided by the old general store and tree farm and the mountains. The line is also popular as a place to watch the trains labor up the steep grade toward Connellsville.

== See also ==
- List of tunnels documented by the Historic American Engineering Record in Pennsylvania
