= Macada, Pennsylvania =

Former village in Northampton County, Pennsylvania, US

Macada
- Former Village
- Etymology: Macadam
- Location within Pennsylvania Location within the United States
- Coordinates: 40.65682903045693°N 75.35622773495402°W
- Country: United States
- State: Pennsylvania
- County: Northampton
- Best's General Store opens: 1889
- Absorbed into Bethlehem: 1904-1920
- Founder: William H. Best

Macada was a former village in Northampton County, Pennsylvania located adjacent to Bethlehem. The village was initially a loosely defined farming community across the entire northern border of the borough until 1889 when William H. Best opened a general store which became the de-facto village center.

== History ==
In 1895, William H. Best's general store also operated as a post office. The village was geographically close to Altonah, with the exact borders between the two villages being poorly defined. When Best chose to name his post office he initially wanted to name it after the older and more established Altonah, however, he decided that the name was too similar to Altoona.

At the same time, Nazareth Pike was being paved with macadam, so Best named the village Macada. The village was annexed by Bethlehem during its consolidation effort between 1904 and 1920; Altonah and Hottlesville, Pennsylvania also were similarly annexed.

Best's general store remained open until 1982 when it no longer became profitable. The lot remained abandoned until 2015 when a pre-school, the Lightbridge Academy, was built on its site. The only remaining trace of Macada today is Macada Road.
