= MarLin, Pennsylvania =

Unincorporated community in Pennsylvania, US

- Census-designated place
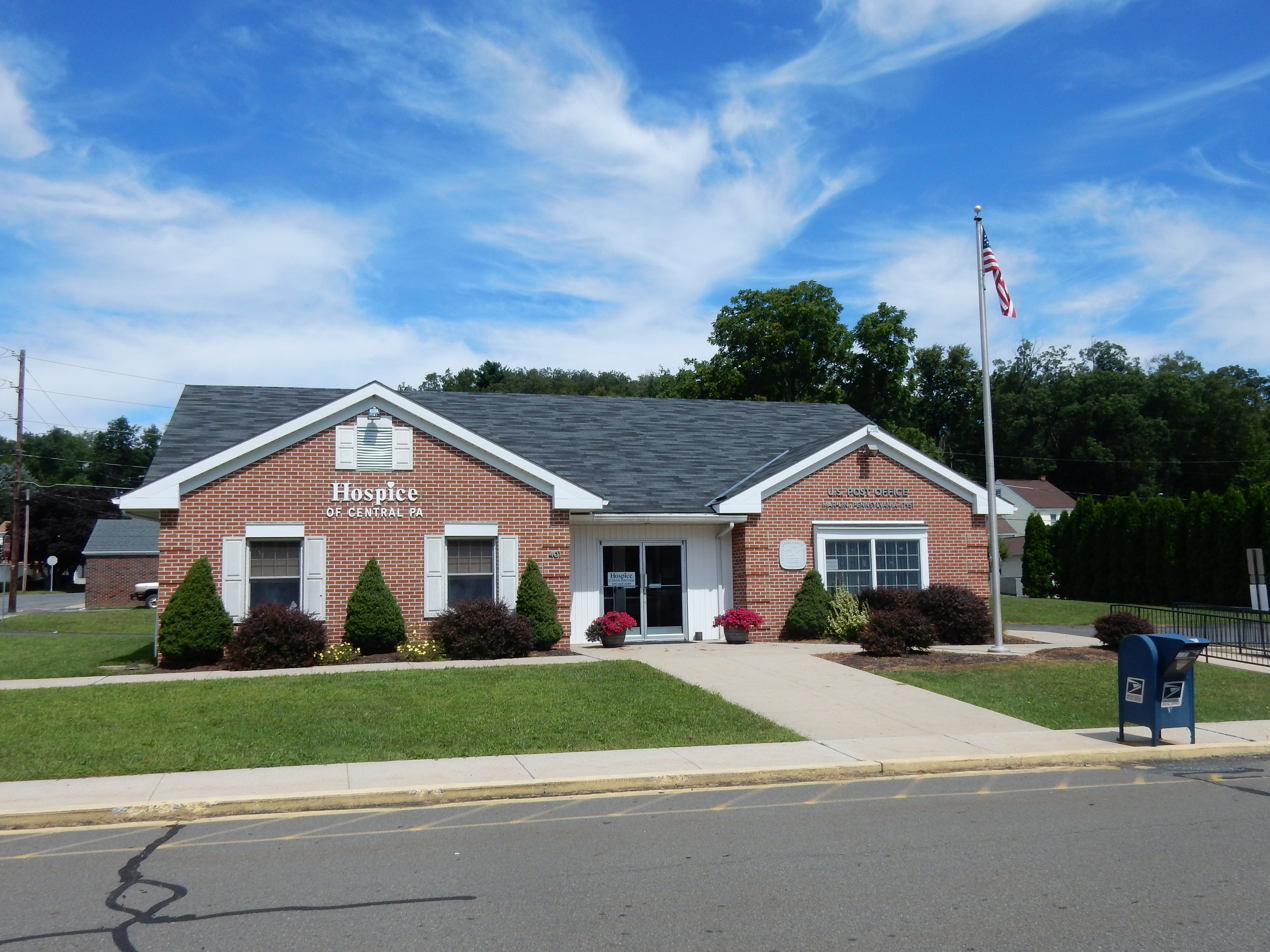
- Post Office in MarLin.

- Location within the U.S. state of Pennsylvania MarLin, Pennsylvania (the United States)
- Coordinates: 40°40′50″N 76°14′39″W
- Country: United States
- State: Pennsylvania
- County: Schuylkill
- Municipality: Norwegian Township

Government
  - Mayor: Ryan Grabowski

Area
  - Total: 0.13 sq mi (0.33 km^{2})
  - Land: 0.13 sq mi (0.33 km^{2})
  - Water: 0 sq mi (0.00 km^{2})

Population (2020)
  - Total: 299
  - Density: 2,326.9/sq mi (898.41/km^{2})
- Time zone: UTC-5 (Eastern (EST))
  - Summer (DST): UTC-4 (EDT)
- ZIP codes: 17951
- Area code: 570
- FIPS code: 42-47600

MarLin (pronounced mar-LIN) is a Village and census-designated place (CDP) in Schuylkill County, Pennsylvania, United States. The population was 299 at the 2020 census. It is a village of Norwegian Township. The village is the seat of government for the township.

== Geography ==
Marlin is located at 40°40′50″N 76°14′39″W (40.680503, -76.244204).

According to the United States Census Bureau, the CDP has a total area of 0.9 square miles (2.3 km^{2}), all land.

== Demographics ==
Historical population
Census	Pop.	Note	%±
2020	299		—
U.S. Decennial Census

At the 2000 census there were 640 people, 269 households, and 181 families living in the CDP. The population density was 710.5 inhabitants per square mile (274.3/km^{2}). There were 278 housing units at an average density of 308.6 per square mile (119.2/km^{2}). The racial makeup of the CDP was 99.38% White and 0.62% African American. Hispanic or Latino of any race were 0.47%.

Of the 269 households, 33.5% had children under the age of 18 living with them, 53.2% were married couples living together, 8.2% had a female householder with no husband present, and 32.7% were non-families. 30.5% of households were one person and 19.3% were one person aged 65 or older. The average household size was 2.38 and the average family size was 2.96.

The age distribution was 24.8% under the age of 18, 4.7% from 18 to 24, 28.0% from 25 to 44, 22.2% from 45 to 64, and 20.3% 65 or older. The median age was 40 years. For every 100 females, there were 99.4 males. For every 100 females age 18 and over, there were 83.6 males.

The median household income was $42,692 and the median family income was $51,106. Males had a median income of $41,000 versus $22,083 for females. The per capita income for the CDP was $19,122. None of the families and 4.9% of the population were living below the poverty line, including no under eighteens and 14.6% of those over 64.

== Gallery ==
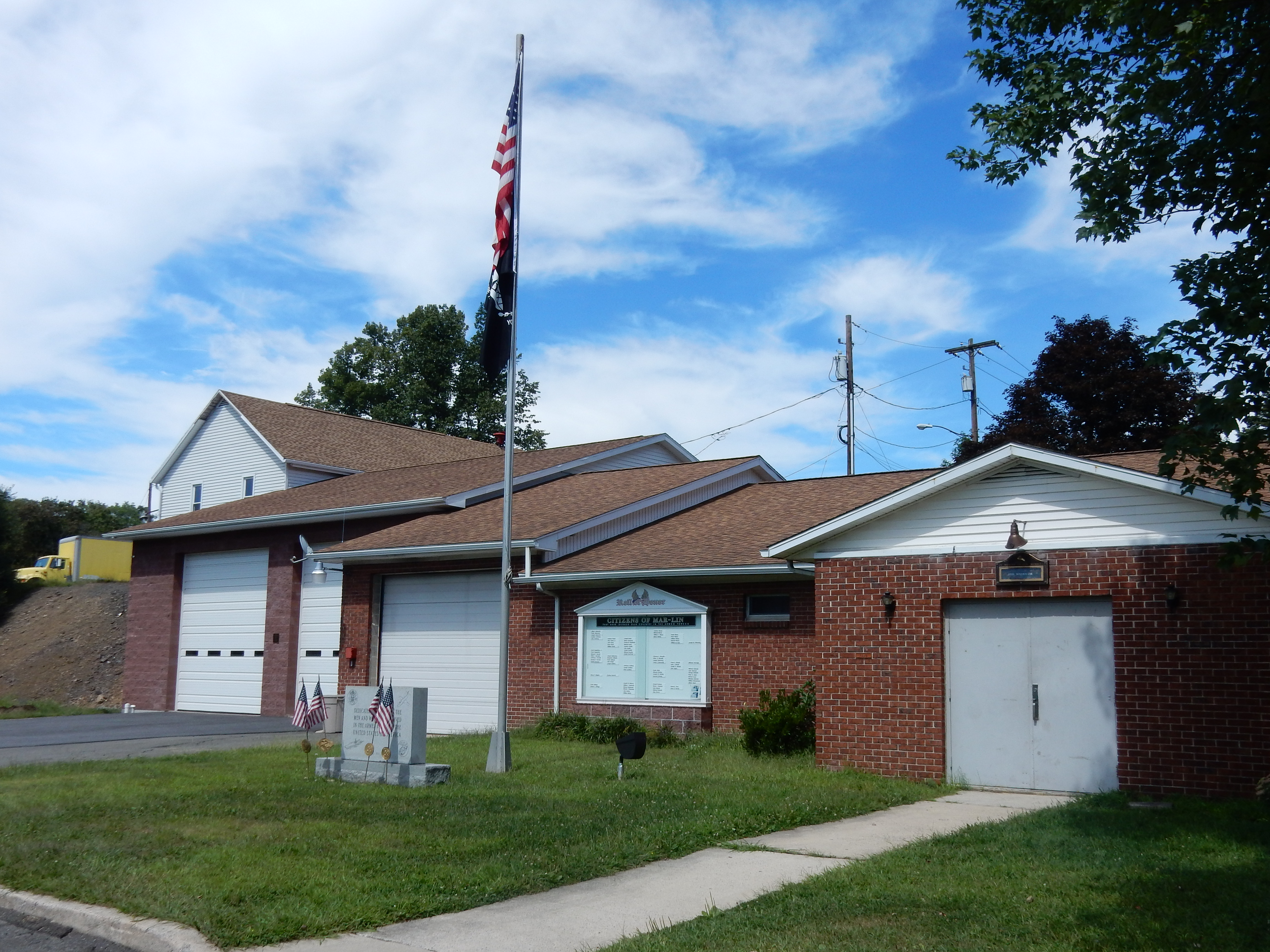
Fire Co. and War Memorial.

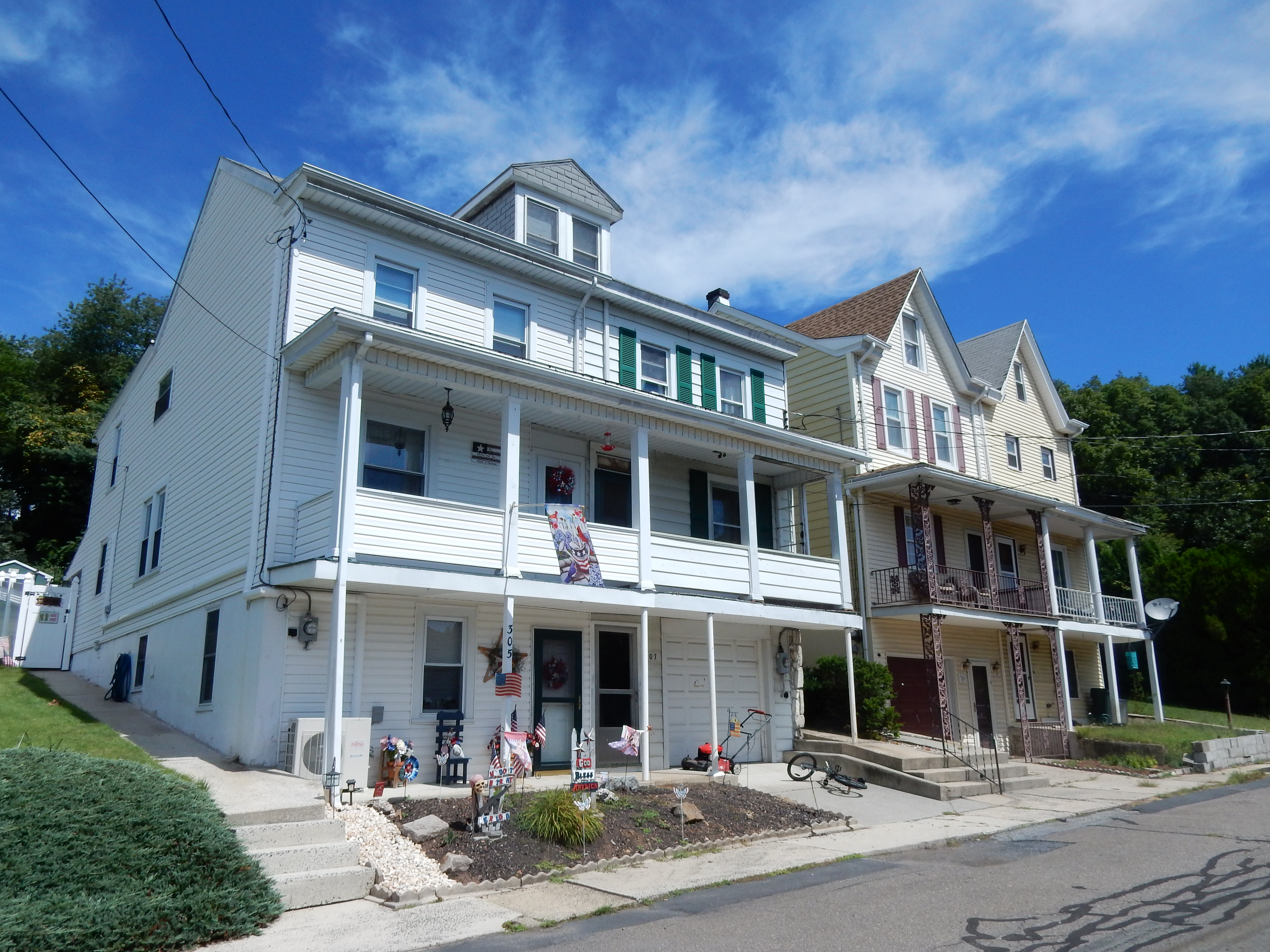
Spruce Street.

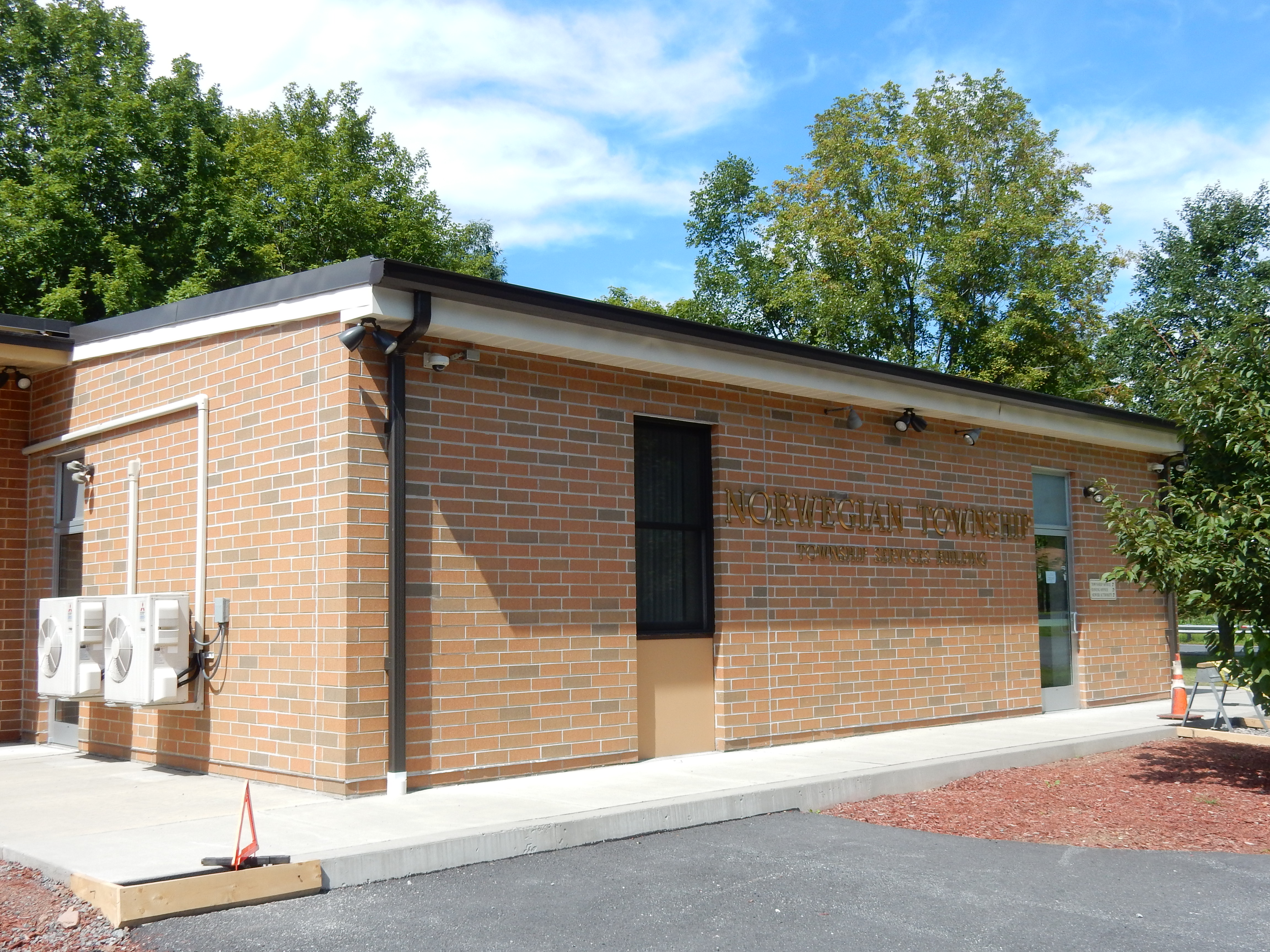
Norwegian Twp. Municipal Bldg.
