= Norwegian Township, Pennsylvania =

Township in Pennsylvania, US

Coordinates: 40°42′00″N 76°13′59″W

- Township
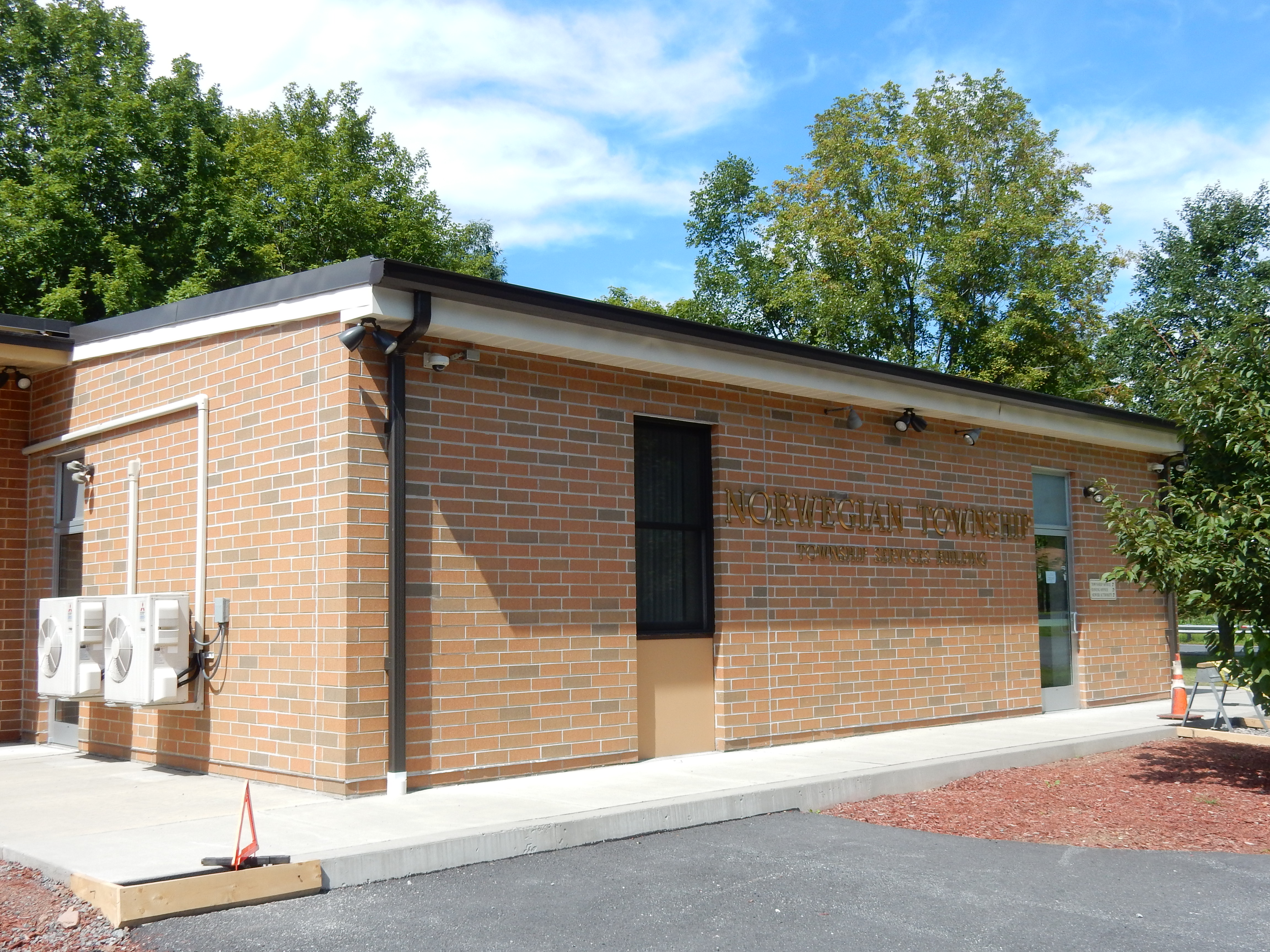
- Norwegian Township Municipal Office in Marlin.

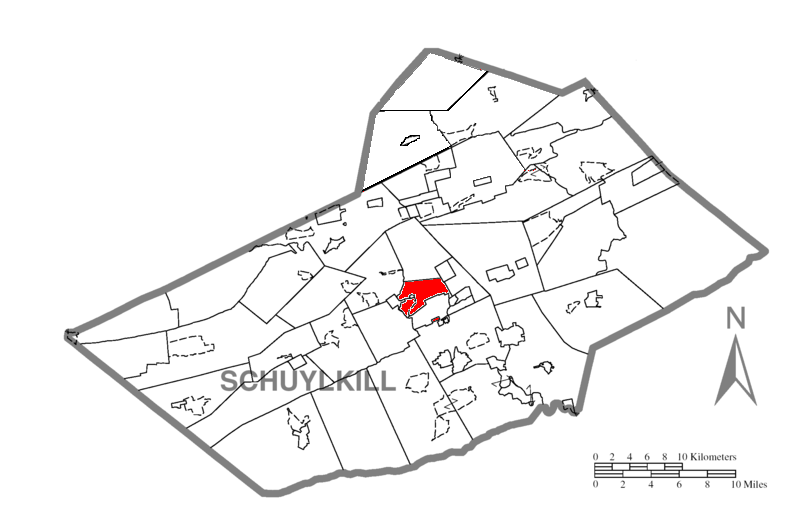
- Map of Schuylkill County, Pennsylvania Highlighting Norwegian Township

- Map of Schuylkill County, Pennsylvania
- Country: United States
- State: Pennsylvania
- County: Schuylkill
- Settled: 1780
- Incorporated: 1811

Area
  - Total: 5.88 sq mi (15.22 km^{2})
  - Land: 5.87 sq mi (15.20 km^{2})
  - Water: 0.0077 sq mi (0.02 km^{2})

Population (2020)
  - Total: 2,156 ▼
  - Estimate (2023): 2,190
  - Density: 383.3/sq mi (147.99/km^{2})
- Time zone: UTC-5 (Eastern (EST))
  - Summer (DST): UTC-4 (EDT)
- FIPS code: 42-107-55624
- Website: https://norwegiantownship.com/

Norwegian Township is a township that is located in Schuylkill County, Pennsylvania, United States. The population was 2,156 at the time of the 2020 census.

== Geography ==
According to the United States Census Bureau, the township has a total area of 5.9 square miles (15.4 km^{2}), of which 5.8 square miles (15.1 km^{2}) is land and 0.1 square mile (0.2 km^{2}) (1.52%) is water. It contains the census-designated places of Marlin and Seltzer.

== Demographics ==
Historical population
Census	Pop.	Note	%±
2010	2,310		—
2020	2,156		−6.7%
2023 (est.)	2,190		1.6%
U.S. Decennial Census

At the time of the 2000 census, there were 2,172 people, 861 households, and 632 families living in the township.

The population density was 371.9 inhabitants per square mile (143.6/km^{2}). There were 894 housing units at an average density of 153.1 per square mile (59.1/km^{2}).

The racial makeup of the township was 98.94% White, 0.18% African American, 0.28% Native American, 0.32% Asian, 0.14% from other races, and 0.14% from two or more races. Hispanic or Latino of any race were 0.32%.

Of the 861 households that were counted during the census, 30.5% had children under the age of eighteen, 61.9% were married couples living together, 7.4% had a female householder with no husband present, and 26.5% were non-families. 23.6% of households were one-person households and 13.6% were one-person households with residents who were aged sixty-five or older.

The average household size was 2.52 and the average family size was 2.99.

The age distribution was 22.4% who were under the age of eighteen, 5.1% who were aged eighteen to twenty-four, 26.3% who were aged twenty-five to forty-four, 29.9% who were aged forty-five to sixty-four, and 16.3% who were aged sixty-five or older. The median age was forty-three years.

For every one hundred females, there were 97.3 males. For every one hundred females who were aged eighteen or older, there were 90.9 males.

The median household income was $42,540 and the median family income was $48,603. Males had a median income of $36,131 compared with that of $25,194 for females.

The per capita income for the township was $18,699.

Approximately 0.8% of families and 3.3% of the population were living below the poverty line, including 1.9% of those who were under the age of eighteen and 6.5% of those who were aged sixty-five or older.

== Gallery ==
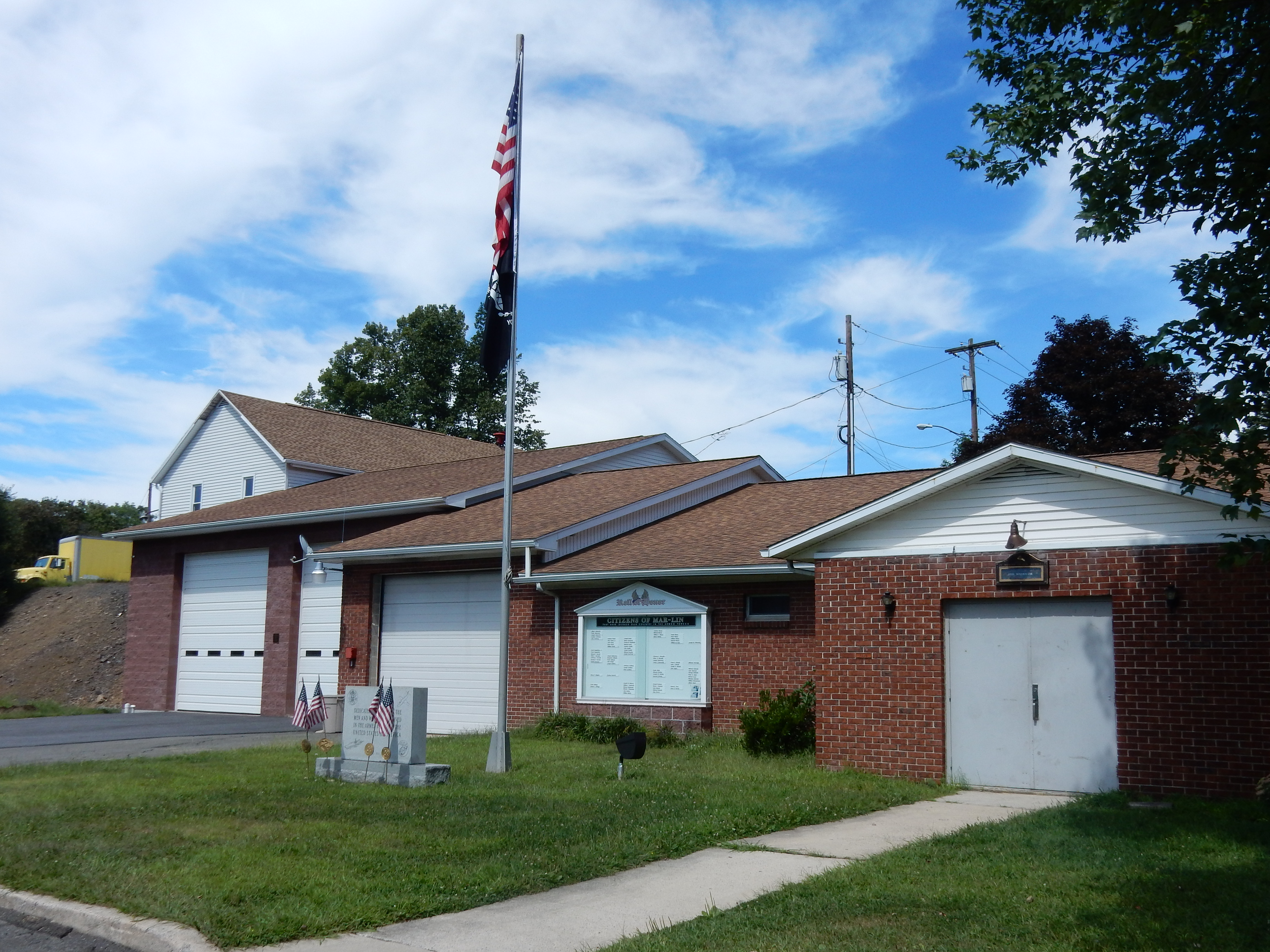
Fire Co. and War Memorial in Marlin, Pennsylvania

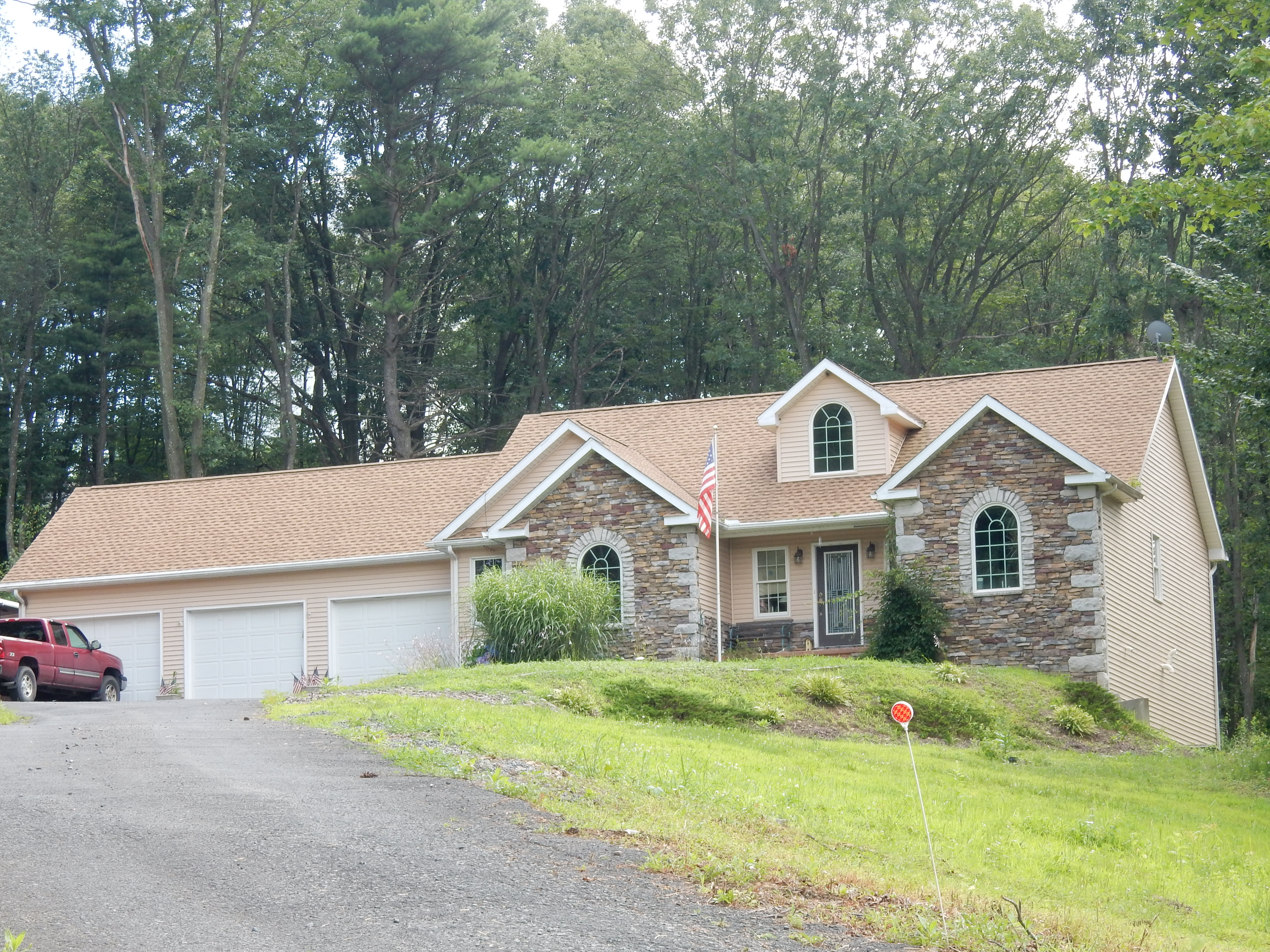
Residence in Mill Creek

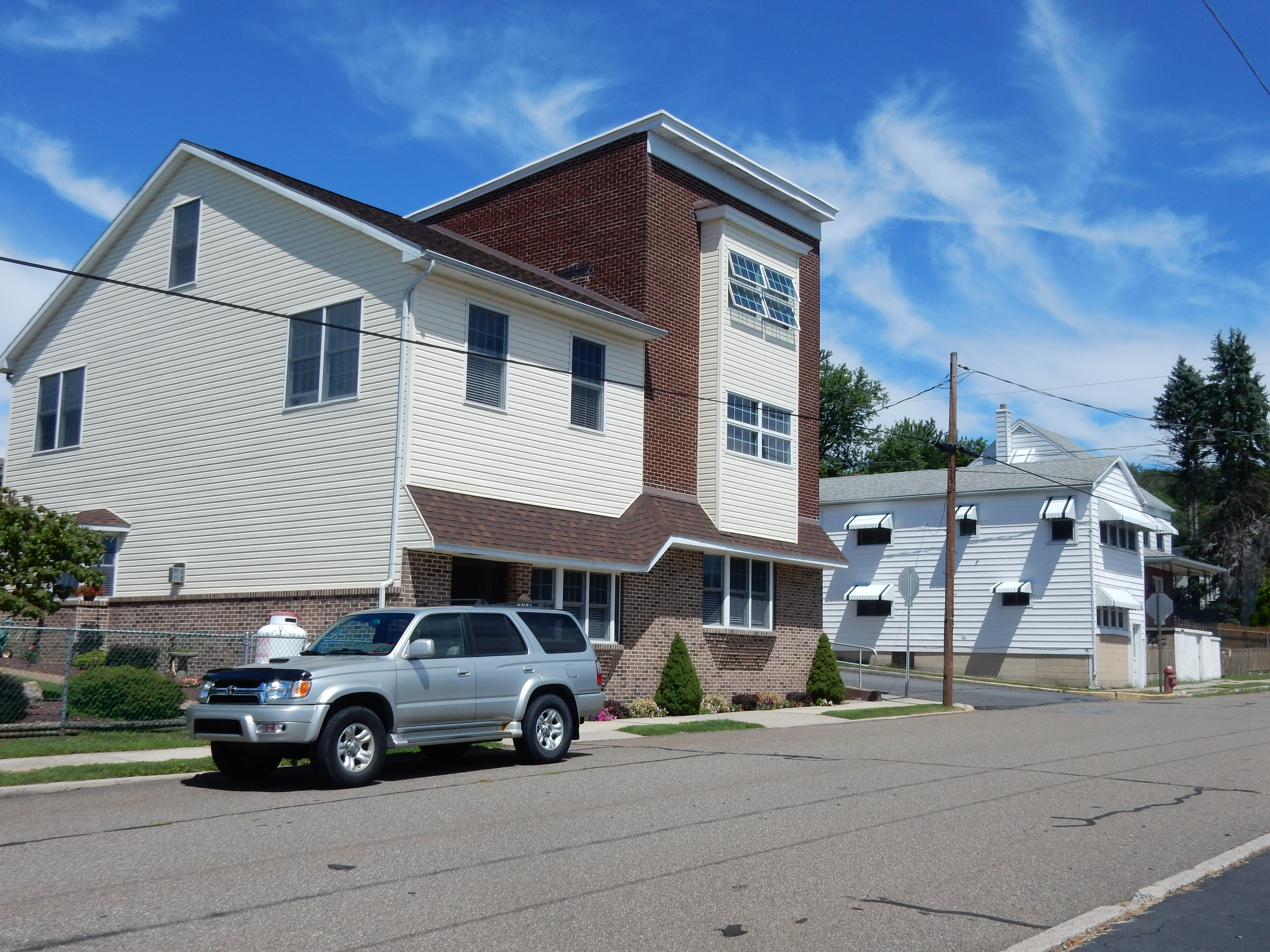
Main Street in Seltzer, Pennsylvania
