= Minisink Hills, Pennsylvania =

Unincorporated community in Pennsylvania, US

- Unincorporated community
- Location within Pennsylvania
- Coordinates: 41°00′01″N 75°08′14″W
- Country: United States
- State: Pennsylvania
- County: Monroe
- Township: Smithfield
- Elevation: 322 ft (98 m)
- Time zone: UTC-5 (Eastern (EST))
  - Summer (DST): UTC-4 (EDT)
- ZIP code: 18341
- Area codes: 570 and 272
- GNIS feature ID: 1212240

Minisink Hills is an unincorporated community located in Smithfield Township in Monroe County, Pennsylvania. Minisink Hills is located at the intersection of Gap View Drive and Hillside Drive, along the west bank of Marshalls Creek, east of East Stroudsburg.
