= Malta, Pennsylvania =

Unincorporated community in Pennsylvania, U.S.

Coordinates: 40°37′04″N 76°54′33″W

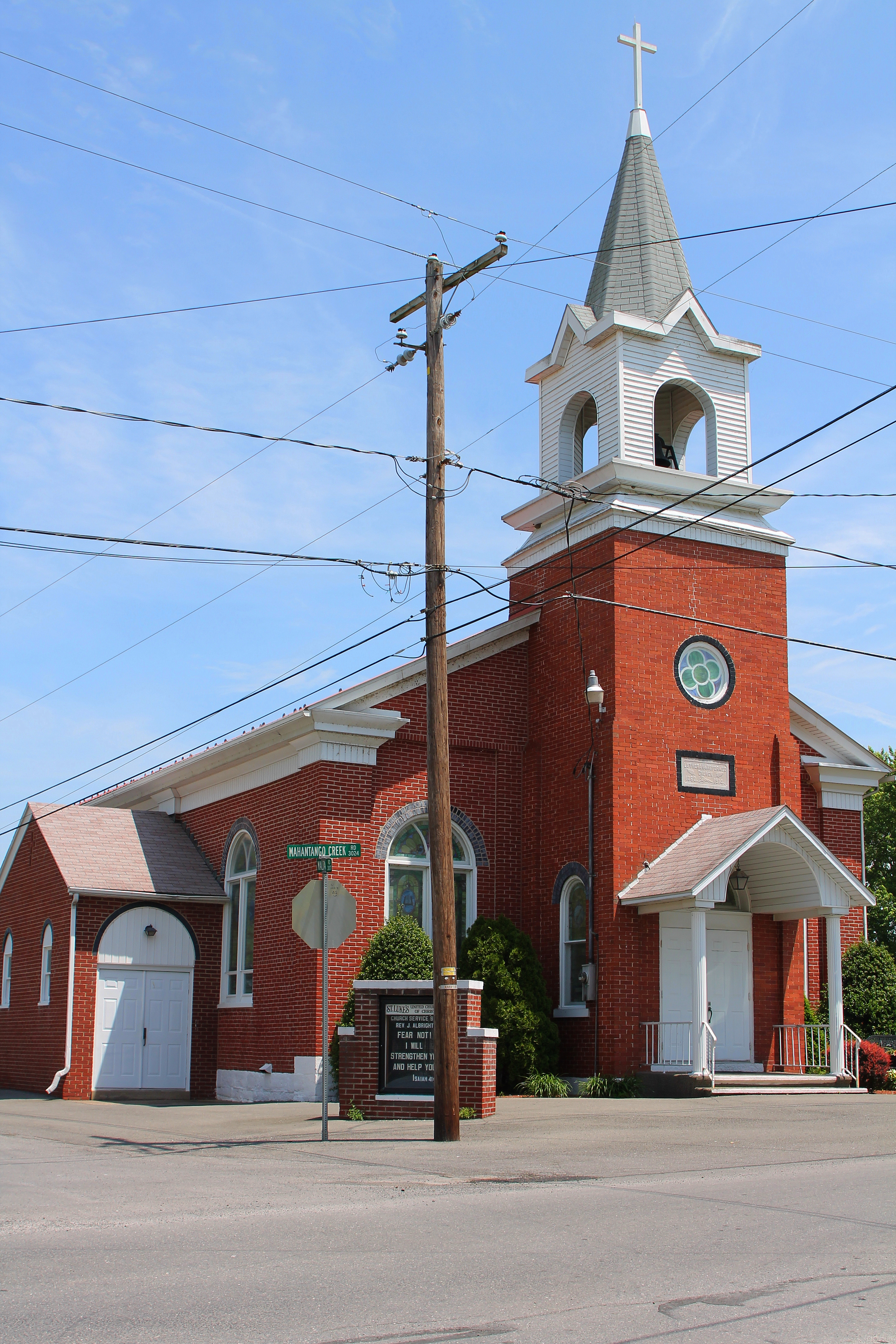
St. Luke's United Church of Christ in Malta

Malta is an unincorporated community in Lower Mahanoy Township Northumberland County, Pennsylvania, United States. It is located in the USGS quadrangle of Millersburg and has an elevation of 541 feet (165 m) above sea level. It was formerly known as Vera Cruz.

Malta is located at the intersection of two roads and was described as a "post village" in the History of Northumberland County, Pennsylvania. In the late 19th century, it contained several mechanic shops, a store, a Reformed and Lutheran church, and approximately twelve residences.
