= Maysville, Mercer County, Pennsylvania =

Unincorporated community in Pennsylvania, US

Maysville
- Unincorporated community
- Location within the state of Pennsylvania Maysville (the United States)
- Coordinates: 41°24′16″N 80°27′9″W
- Country: United States
- State: Pennsylvania
- County: Mercer
- Township: West Salem Township
- Elevation: 1,033 ft (315 m)
- Time zone: UTC-5 (Eastern (EST))
  - Summer (DST): UTC-4 (EDT)
- GNIS feature ID: 1199904

Maysville is an unincorporated community located within West Salem Township, Mercer County, Pennsylvania.
