= Midland, Washington County, Pennsylvania =

Midland, Pennsylvania
- Unincorporated community Census designated place
- Location within Pennsylvania Location within the United States
- Coordinates: 40°15′32.4″N 80°13′4.8″W
- Country: United States
- State: Pennsylvania
- County: Washington
- Township: Chartiers

Area
  - Total: 0.407 sq mi (1.05 km^{2})
  - Land: 0.407 sq mi (1.05 km^{2})
  - Water: 0 sq mi (0 km^{2})
- Elevation: 1,004 ft (306 m)
- Time zone: UTC-5 (Eastern (EST))
  - Summer (DST): UTC-4 (EDT)
- FIPS code: 42-49192
- GNIS feature ID: 2830852

Midland is an unincorporated community and census designated place (CDP) in Chartiers Township, Washington County, Pennsylvania.

== Demographics ==
Historical population
Census	Pop.	Note	%±

The United States Census Bureau first defined Midland as a census designated place in 2023.
