= McClellan Heights, Pennsylvania =

Coordinates: 39°56′49″N 76°43′58″W

McClellan Heights, located in York County, Pennsylvania, United States, is a neighborhood adjacent to the city of York and is part of the campus of the York College of Pennsylvania.
