= Manifold, Pennsylvania =

Unincorporated community in Pennsylvania, US

Manifold
- Unincorporated community
- Location within the state of Pennsylvania Manifold (the United States)
- Coordinates: 40°11′42″N 80°13′7″W
- Country: United States
- State: Pennsylvania
- County: Washington
- Elevation: 1,066 ft (325 m)
- Time zone: UTC-5 (Eastern (EST))
  - Summer (DST): UTC-4 (EDT)
- ZIP codes: 15366
- GNIS feature ID: 1180272

Manifold is an unincorporated community and coal town in Washington County, Pennsylvania, United States.
