= Merrittstown, Ohio =

Unincorporated community in Ohio, U.S.

Coordinates: 39°29′39″N 84°12′00″W

Merrittstown is an unincorporated community in Warren County, in the U.S. state of Ohio.

== History ==
The community was named after Abram and Caleb Merritt, proprietors of a local tile factory.
