= Mance, Pennsylvania =

- Populated place
- Location within Pennsylvania
- Coordinates: 39.8317493°N 78.9366902°W
- Country: United States
- State: Pennsylvania
- County: Somerset
- Township: Northampton
- Elevation: 1,982 ft (604 m)
- Time zone: UTC-5 (Eastern (EST))
  - Summer (DST): UTC-4 (EDT)
- ZIP Code: 15552 (Meyersdale)

Mance is a populated place within Northampton Township, a minor civil division of Somerset County, Pennsylvania. The place is a popular spot for railfans as it's alongside Sand Patch Grade's (Keystone Subdivision) "horseshoe curve", where an old (no longer in service, now privately owned) U.S. Post Office also exists.
