= Marble, Pennsylvania =

Unincorporated community in Pennsylvania, US

- Unincorporated community
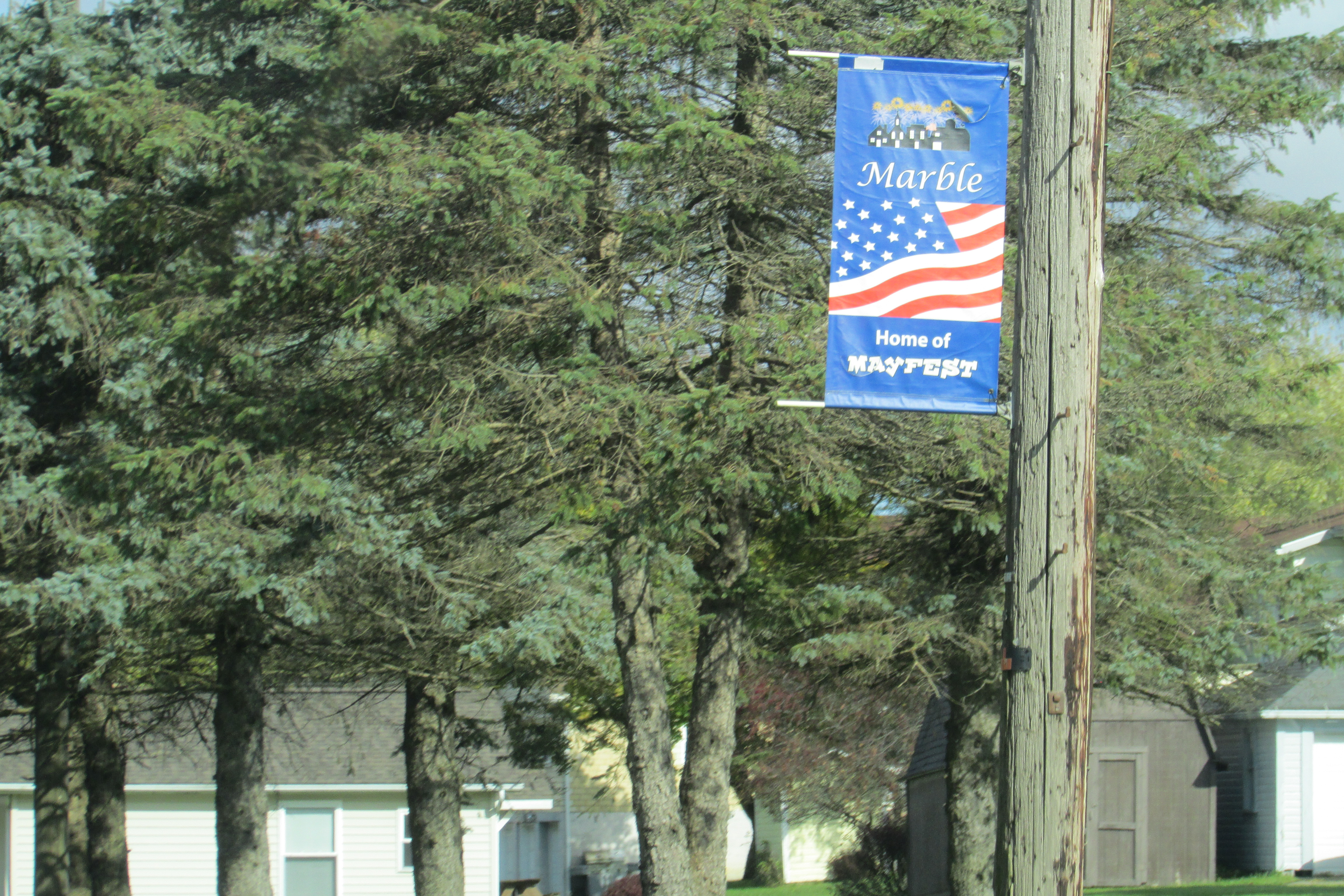
- Banner for Marble, Pennsylvania along PA 208

- Location within Pennsylvania
- Coordinates: 41°20′20″N 79°26′17″W
- Country: United States
- State: Pennsylvania
- County: Clarion
- Elevation: 1,552 ft (473 m)
- Time zone: UTC-5 (Eastern (EST))
  - Summer (DST): UTC-4 (EDT)
- ZIP code: 16334
- Area code: 814
- GNIS feature ID: 1180385

Marble is an unincorporated community in Clarion County, Pennsylvania, United States. The community is located along Pennsylvania Route 208, 6.2 miles (10.0 km) north of Shippenville. Marble has a post office with ZIP code 16334.
