= Molltown, Pennsylvania =

Unincorporated community in Pennsylvania, US

- Unincorporated community
- Location within Pennsylvania Location within the United States
- Coordinates: 40°23′01″N 75°43′58″W
- Country: United States
- State: Pennsylvania
- County: Berks
- Township: Maidencreek
- Time zone: UTC-5 (EST)
  - Summer (DST): UTC-4 (EDT)
- Area code: 610

Molltown is a small unincorporated community in central Berks County, Pennsylvania, United States. The village is located near Lake Ontelaunee and is located on Maidencreek Road, a back road in the area. It is part of the Fleetwood Area School District.

A post office called Molltown was established in 1839, and remained in operation until being discontinued in 1920. The community was named for the Moll family of settlers.
