= Murdocksville, Pennsylvania =

Unincorporated community in Pennsylvania, U.S.

Coordinates: 40°28′43″N 80°21′21″W

Murdocksville is an unincorporated community in Allegheny County, in the U.S. state of Pennsylvania.

== History ==
The community was named for James Murdock, an early settler.
