= Moween, Pennsylvania =

Unincorporated community in Pennsylvania, United States

Coordinates: 40°28′54″N 79°25′55″W

Moween is a village located on the Conemaugh River and is part of Loyalhanna Township in Westmoreland County, Pennsylvania, United States. The approximate population is 150 residents. School age children in the village of Moween attend River Valley School District and Saltsburg Elementary.

Moween is considered part of Saltsburg due to its proximity to the larger town.
