= Mount Aetna, Pennsylvania =

Unincorporated community in Pennsylvania, US

Coordinates: 40°25′09″N 76°17′43″W

- Census-designated place
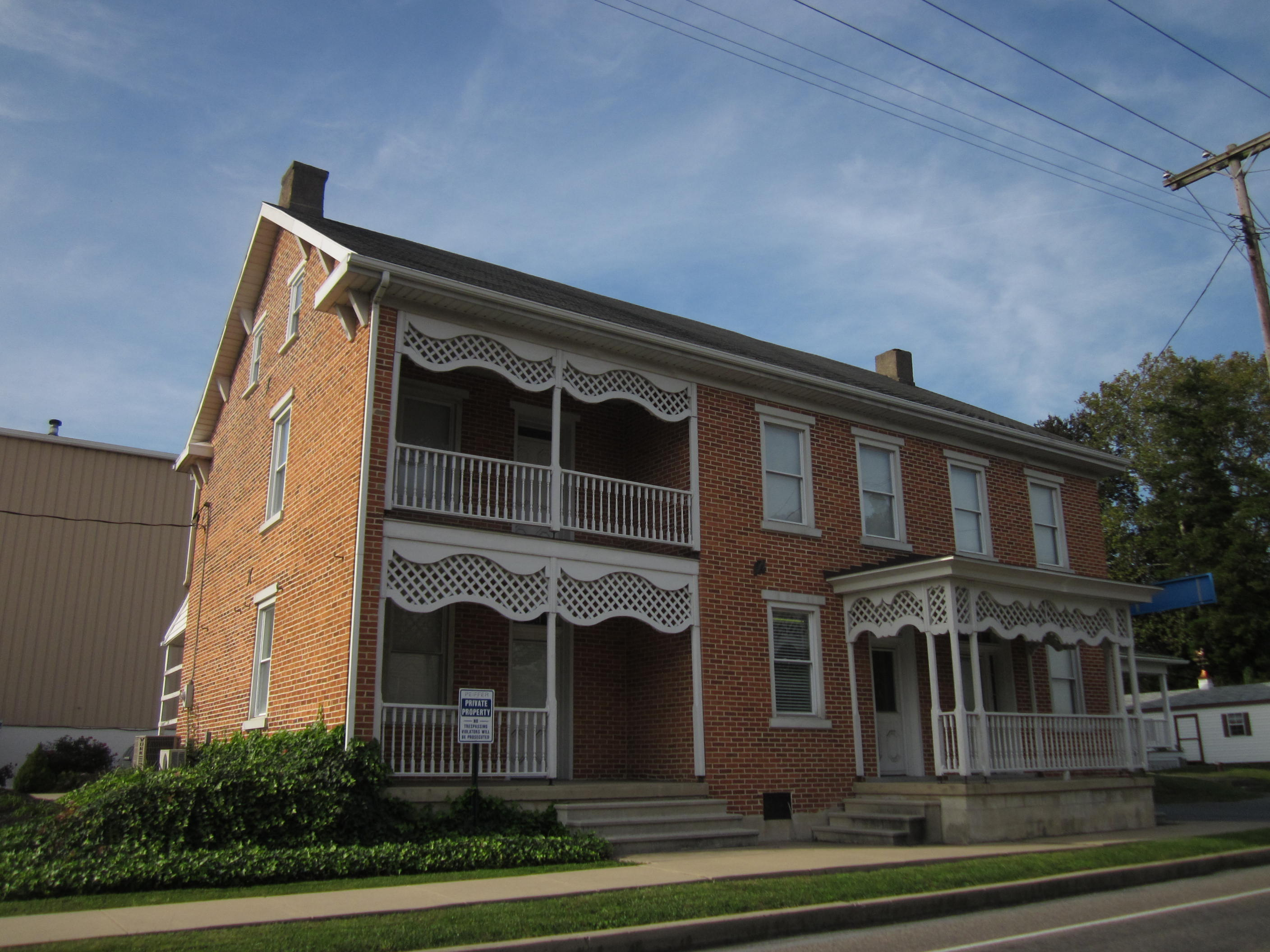
- House in Mount Aetna

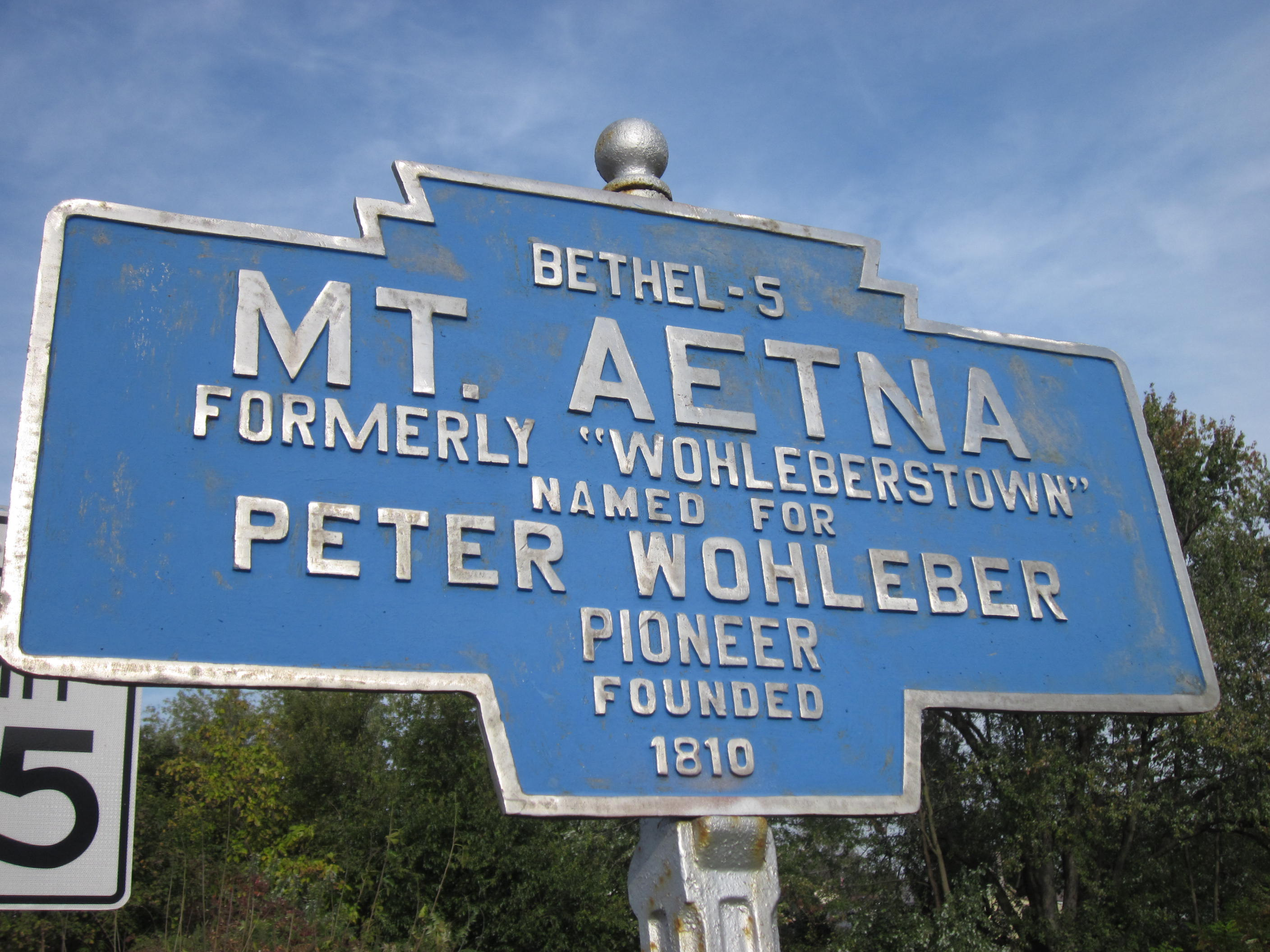
- Keystone Marker
- Interactive map of Mount Aetna, Pennsylvania
- Country: United States
- State: Pennsylvania
- County: Berks
- Township: Tulpehocken

Area
  - Total: 0.49 sq mi (1.28 km^{2})
  - Land: 0.49 sq mi (1.28 km^{2})
  - Water: 0 sq mi (0.00 km^{2})

Population (2020)
  - Total: 489
  - Density: 988.2/sq mi (381.55/km^{2})
- Time zone: UTC-5 (Eastern (EST))
  - Summer (DST): UTC-4 (EDT)
- ZIP codes: 19544
- FIPS code: 42-51320

Mount Aetna is a census-designated place in Tulpehocken Township, Pennsylvania, United States. It is located along Pennsylvania Route 501 near the border of Lebanon County. The community is named after the active volcano, Mount Etna, in Sicily. As of the 2010 census, the population was 354 residents.

== Demographics ==
Historical population
Census	Pop.	Note	%±
2020	489		—
U.S. Decennial Census

== See also ==
- Media related to Mount Aetna, Pennsylvania at Wikimedia Commons
