= Merrian, Pennsylvania =

Unincorporated community in Pennsylvania, US

Merriam, Pennsylvania
- Unincorporated community
- Location within the state of Pennsylvania Merrian (the United States)
- Coordinates: 40°46′42″N 76°24′34″W
- Country: United States
- State: Pennsylvania
- County: Northumberland
- Time zone: UTC-5 (Eastern (EST))
  - Summer (DST): UTC-4 (EDT)

Merriam is an unincorporated community in Northumberland County, Pennsylvania, United States.
