= Merrittstown, Pennsylvania =

Unincorporated community in Pennsylvania, US

- Unincorporated community
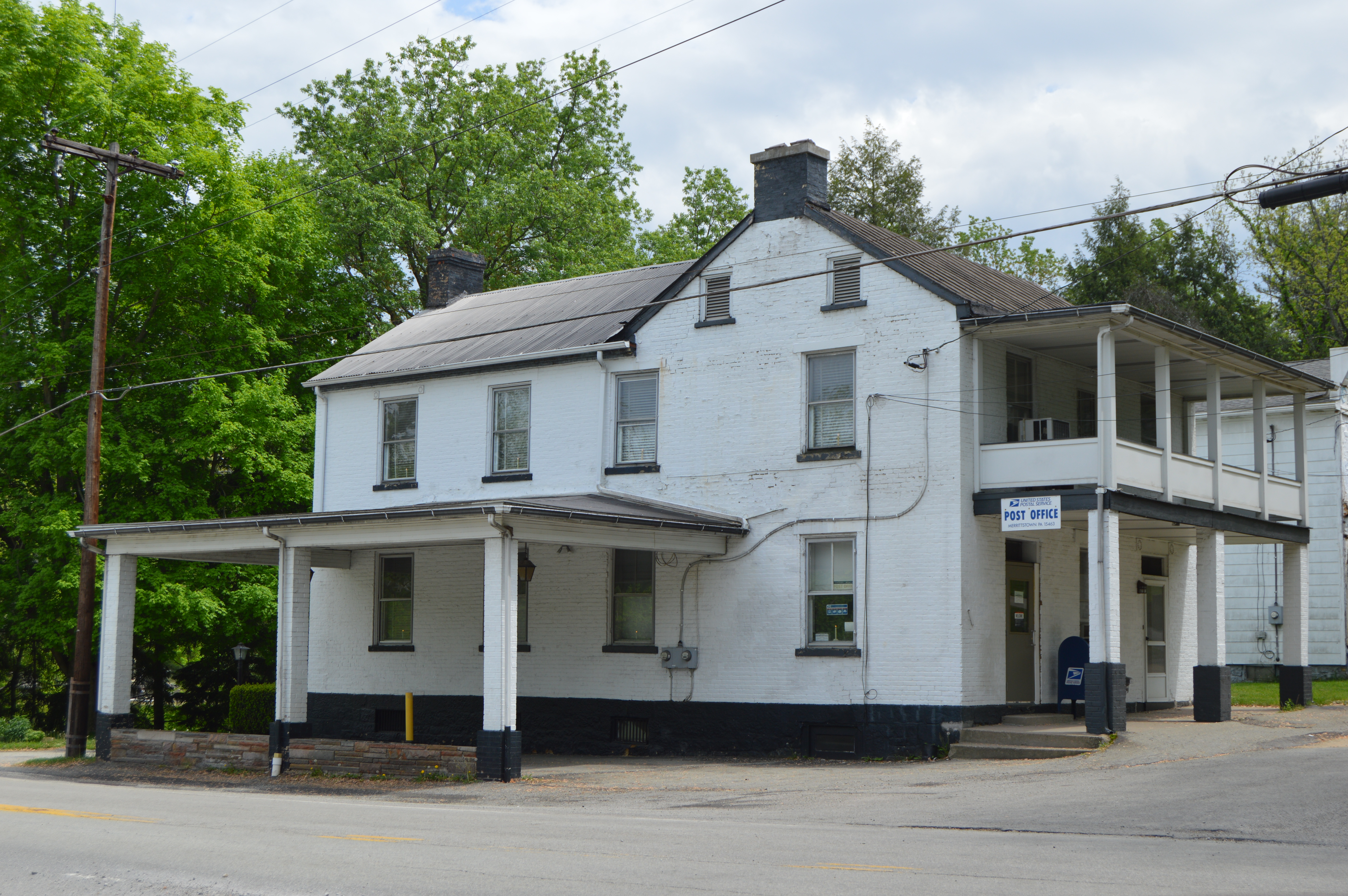

- Location within Pennsylvania
- Coordinates: 39°58′22″N 79°52′39″W
- Country: United States
- State: Pennsylvania
- County: Fayette
- Elevation: 1,007 ft (307 m)
- Time zone: UTC-5 (Eastern (EST))
  - Summer (DST): UTC-4 (EDT)
- ZIP code: 15463
- Area codes: 724, 878
- GNIS feature ID: 1180956

Merrittstown is an unincorporated community in Fayette County, Pennsylvania, United States. The community is located along Pennsylvania Route 166, 3.5 miles (5.6 km) south of Brownsville. Merrittstown has a post office, with ZIP code 15463.
