= Hottlesville, Pennsylvania =

Hottlesville
- Former Village
- An 1886 map of the Bethlehems with Hottlesville in the northeastern corner
- Etymology: Hottle's Village
- Location within Pennsylvania Location within the United States
- Coordinates: 40.632870876328276°N 75.37443225096071°W
- Country: United States
- State: Pennsylvania
- County: Northampton
- Absorbed into Bethlehem: 1905

Government
  - Chief Burgess: Unknown

Population (1896)
  - Total: 1,000

Hottlesville was an incorporated village in Northampton County, Pennsylvania, and one of the original suburbs of Bethlehem.

== History ==
=== 19th century ===
In the 1870 census, the village's population was 200.

During a small-pox outbreak in 1881 to 1882 four residents succumbed to the disease. In 1896, the St Stephen's Lutheran church was constructed in the village, and its population was 1,000.

=== 20th century ===
The village was annexed to Bethlehem, Pennsylvania in 1905, representing the second municipality to lose its independence during the Bethlehems' consolidation, just after West Bethlehem's annexation the previous year, in 1904.

One of the few enduring signs of Hottlesville is Hottle Avenue located presently adjacent to Liberty High School.

The municipal government of the village was led by a Chief Burgess, which was common for most Pennsylvania municipalities prior to the 20th century. The municipal government also operated a public elementary school.
