= Pleasantville, Berks County, Pennsylvania =

Unincorporated community in Pennsylvania, U.S.

Pleasantville Manatawny
- Unincorporated community
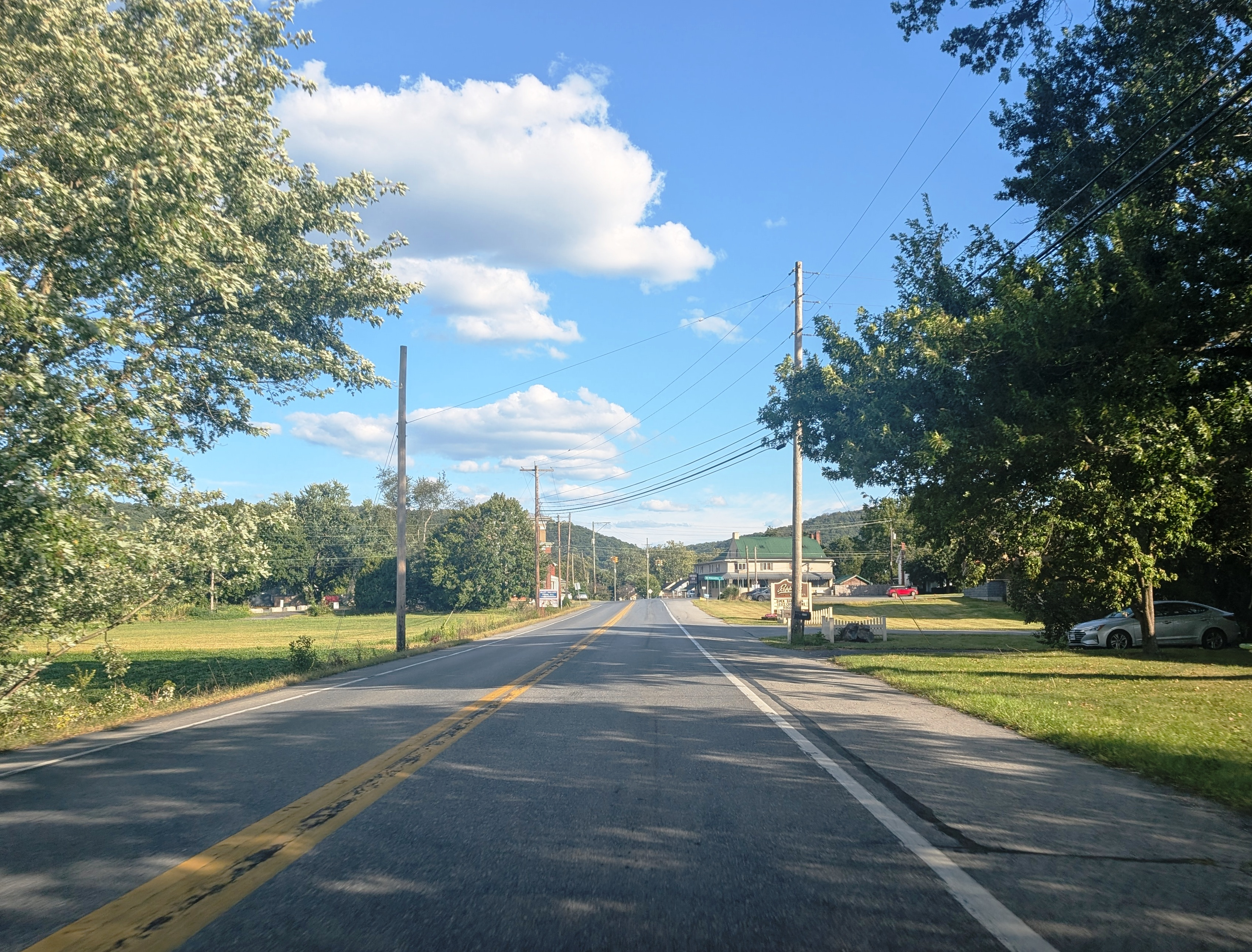
- PA 73 eastbound in the center of Pleasantville

- Location within Pennsylvania
- Coordinates: 40.384107°N 75.732611°W
- Country: United States
- State: Pennsylvania
- County: Berks
- Township: Oley
- Elevation: 177 ft (54 m)
- Time zone: UTC-5 (Eastern (EST))
  - Summer (DST): UTC-4 (EDT)
- Area codes: 610 and 484
- GNIS feature ID: 1180258

Pleasantville, also known as Manatawny, is an unincorporated community in Oley Township, Berks County, Pennsylvania, United States. It is located at the junction of Pennsylvania Route 73 and Covered Bridge Road. Important places in Pleasantville include the Pleasantville Park, Pleasantville Covered Bridge, and Pleasantville Evangelical Church.

The village's alternate name comes from the Manatawny Creek which runs nearby.

== History ==
A post office called Manatawny was established in 1851, and remained in operation until 1968.

== Gallery ==
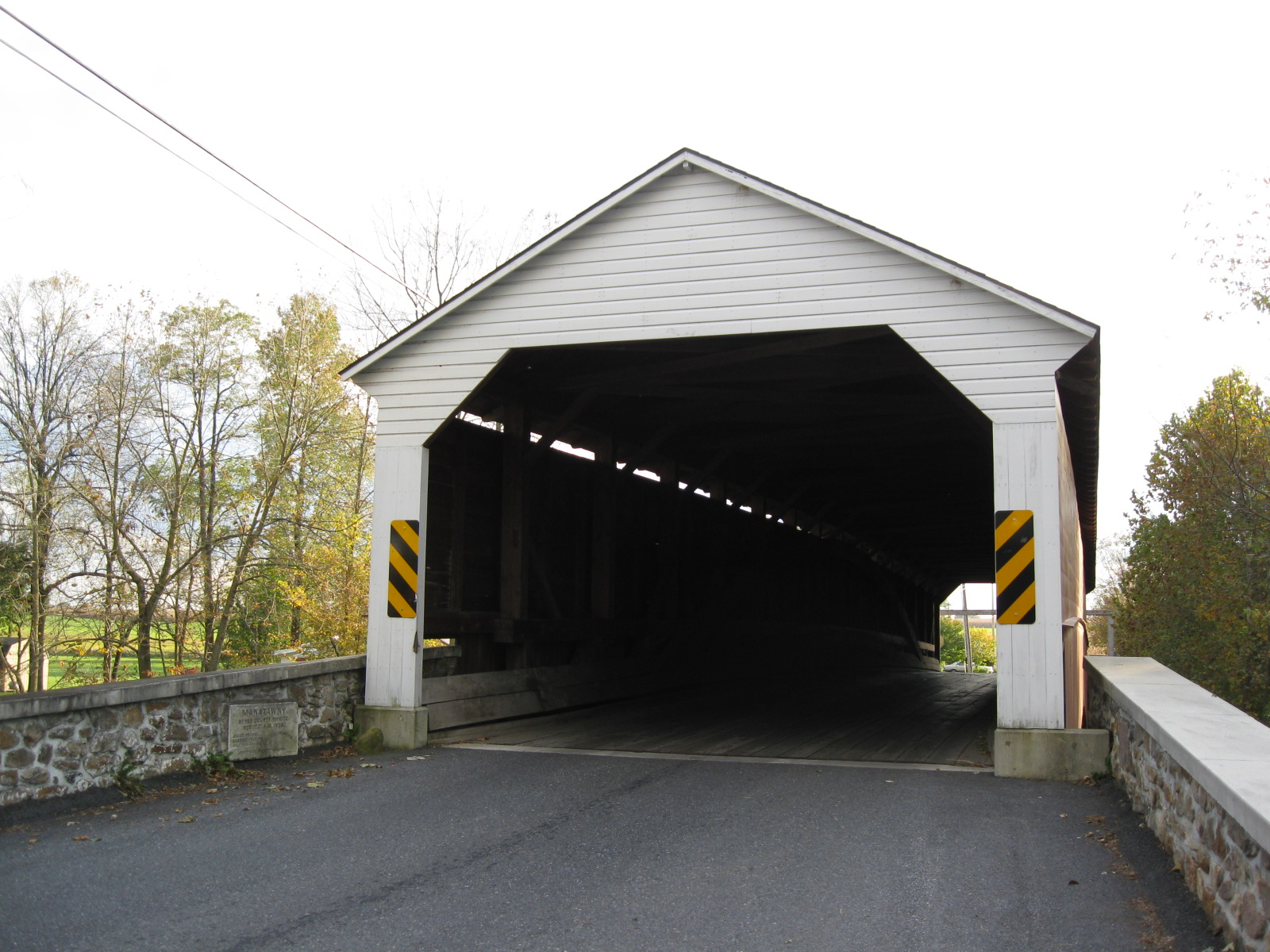

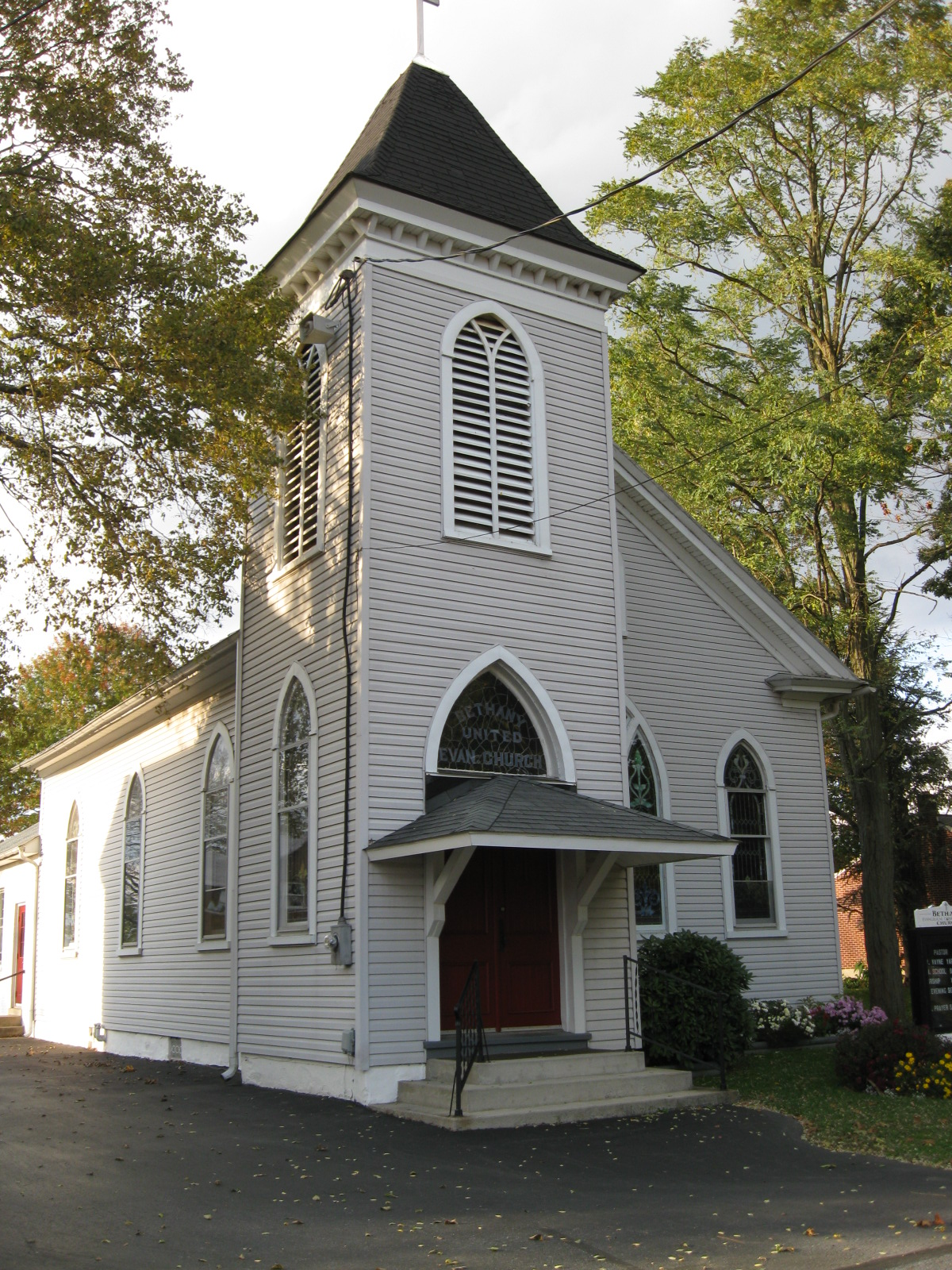

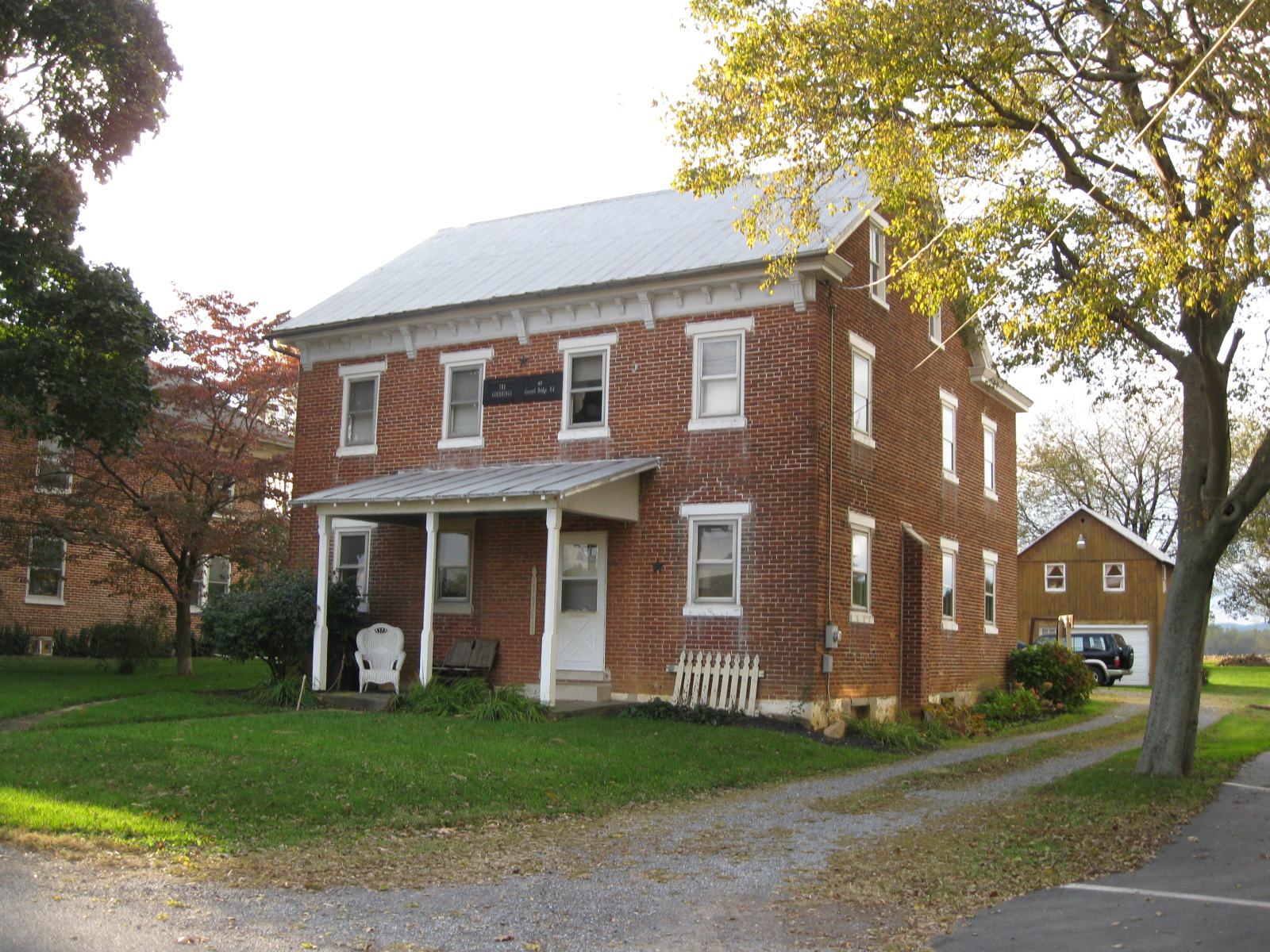

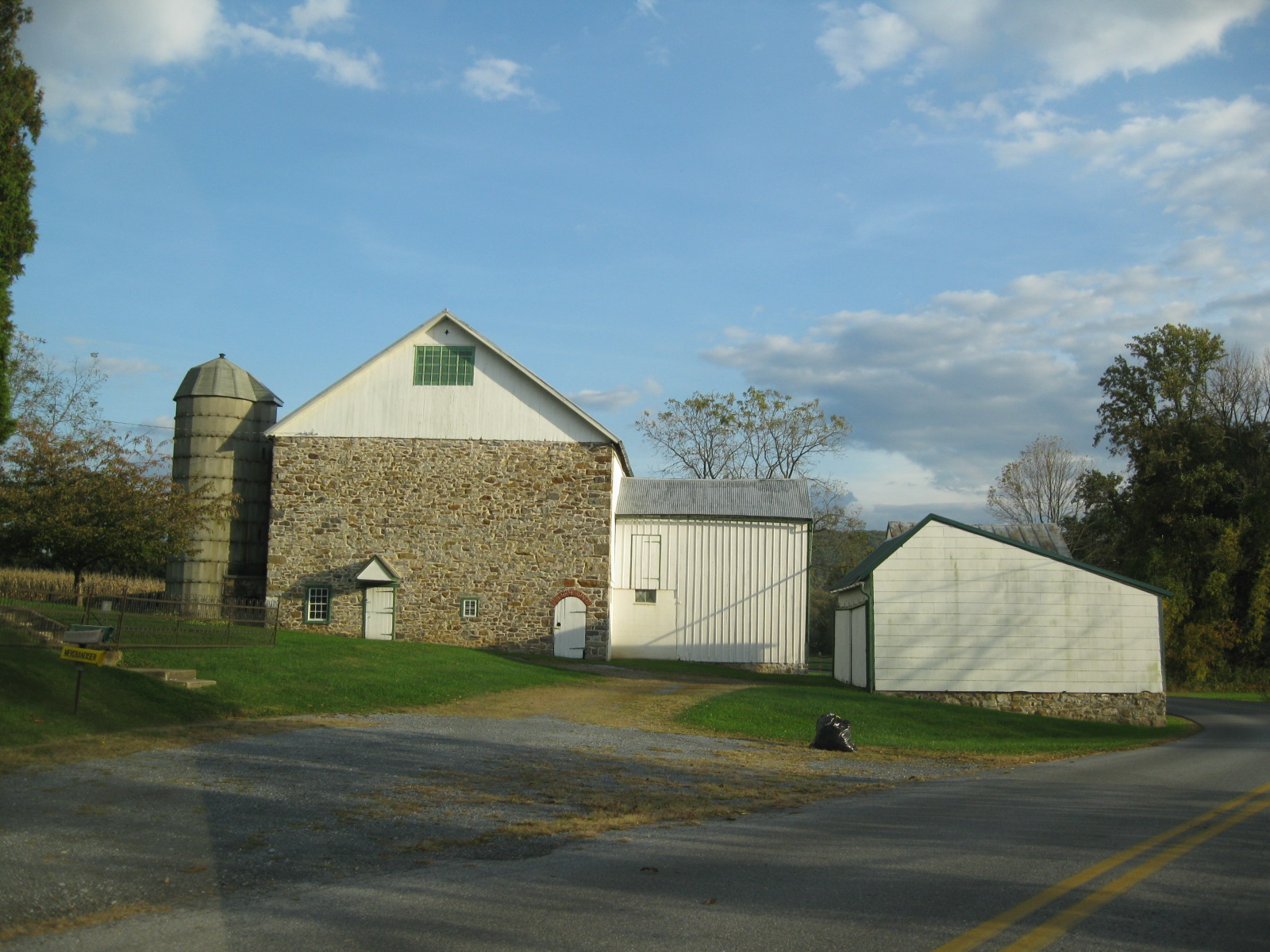

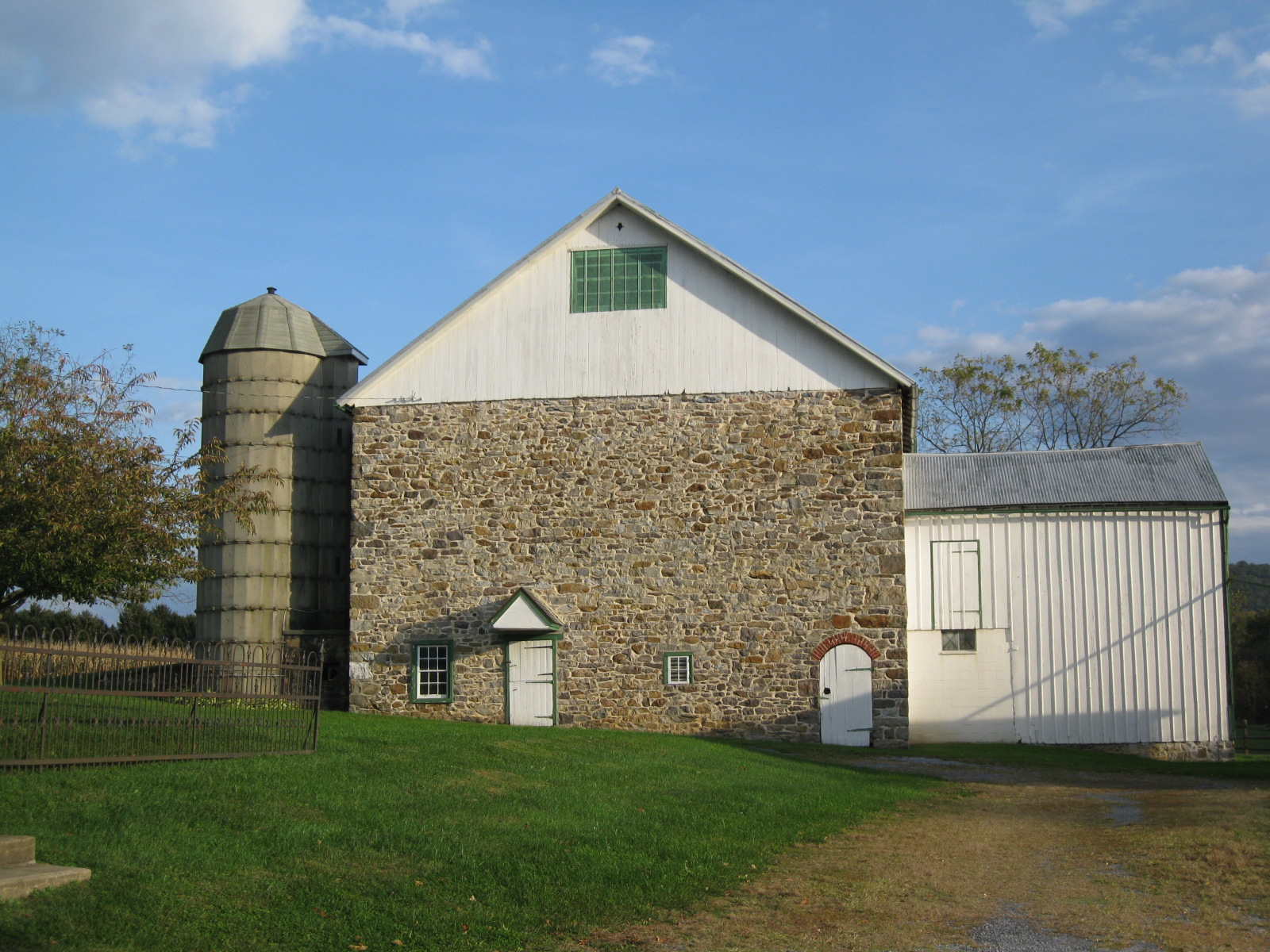
