= Village (Pennsylvania) =

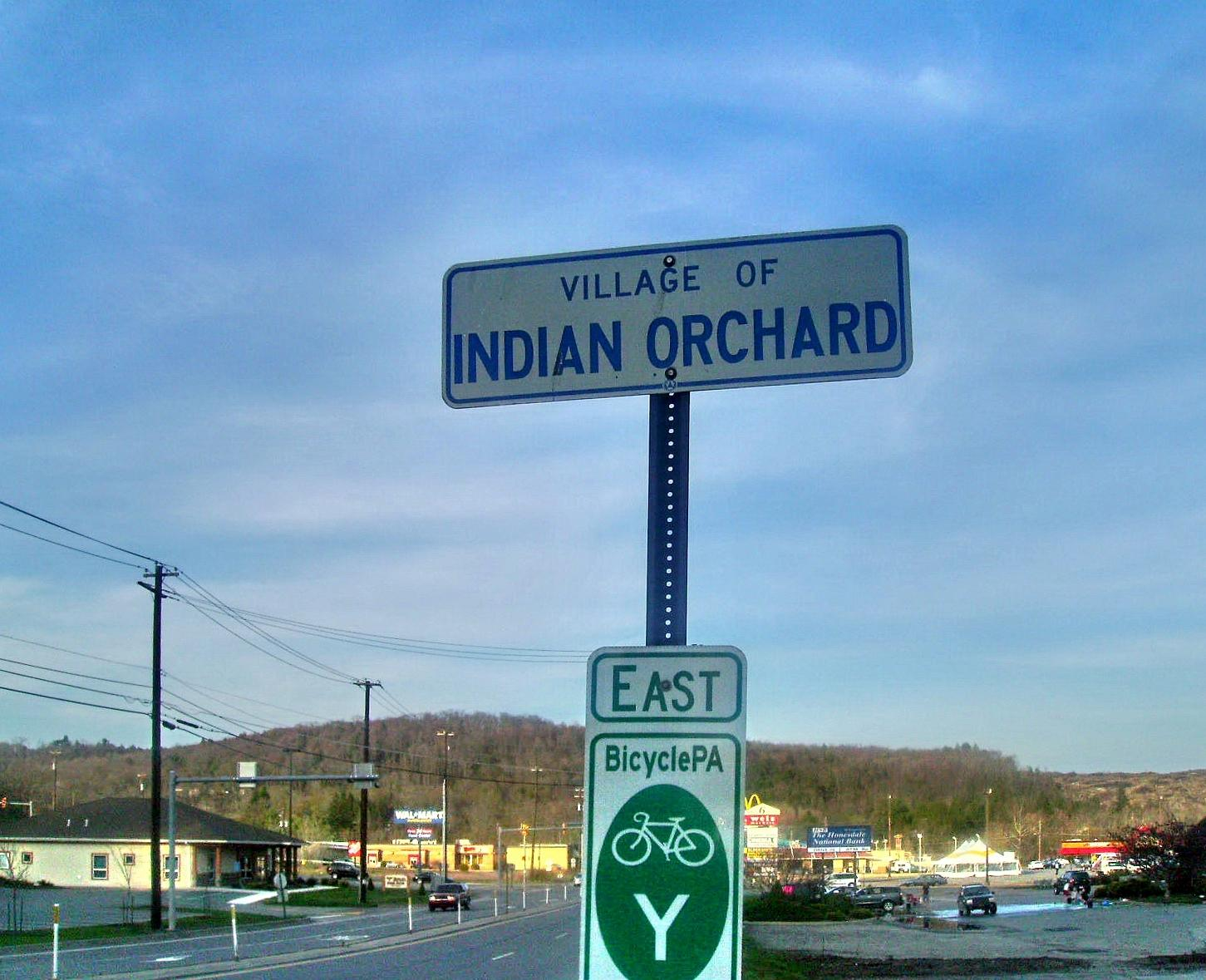
Signage for the village of Indian Orchard in Wayne County

A village in Pennsylvania is a geographic area within a larger political subdivision, usually a township, although some villages are located within a borough. Many of the villages in Pennsylvania are census-designated place centered around a post office, but this is not always the case.

The use of the term "village" in the Commonwealth of Pennsylvania is a historical holdover that is unusual among U.S. states as the term village is used in other states to describe smaller self-governing municipal divisions that Pennsylvania calls "boroughs."

== Geographic area ==
Villages in Pennsylvania are very often loosely defined by local residents with no definitive borders, other than possibly a speed zone along the highways serving them. They often represent the area of original settlement in an area.

== Government ==
As villages in Pennsylvania are not political subdivision in and of themselves, they have no local governmental authority. Instead, they are part of, and under the authority of, their respective municipality. In townships, a village typically serves as the seat of the township government (for example, the town offices for Foster Township, McKean County, Pennsylvania are located in the village of Foster Brook).

However, prior to the United States Civil War, some villages maintained a limited self government, operating a village council, electing a Chief Burgess and operating public schools, maintaining roads, and setting local ordinance.

== See also ==
- Local government in Pennsylvania
- Hamlet (place)
- Frazione, the Italian equivalent
