= Danville High School (Pennsylvania) =

Danville Area High School
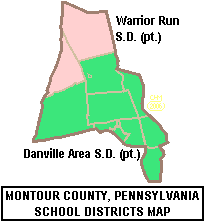

Location
- 733 Ironmen Lane; Danville, Pennsylvania 17821-9131; United States; 40°57′28″N 76°36′02″W

Information
- Type: Public
- School district: Danville Area School District
- Principal: Jeremy Winn; Amy Willoughby
- Faculty: 48 (2016)
- Grades: 9–12
- Enrollment: 645 (2023–2024)
- Language: English
- Colors: Orange and purple
- Team name: Ironmen
- Feeder schools: Danville Area Middle School
- Website: dhs.danvillesd.org

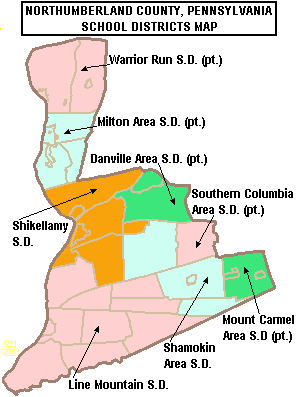
Map of Northumberland County, Pennsylvania Public School Districts

Danville High School is located at 733 Ironmen Lane, Danville, Pennsylvania. The school is part of the Danville Area School District. The high school serves fragments of two rural Pennsylvania counties. In Montour County the school serves the Boroughs of Danville and Washingtonville and Cooper Township, Derry Township, Liberty Township, Mahoning Township, Mayberry Township, Valley Township and West Hemlock Township. In Northumberland County it covers the Borough of Riverside and Rush Township. In 2018, the principal of the school is Jeremy Winn and the assistant principal is Ms. Amy Willoughby.

In 2016, enrollment was 608 pupils in 9th through 12th grades. The school employed 48 teachers.

Danville Area High school students may choose to attend the Columbia-Montour Area Vocational Technical School for training in the construction and mechanical trades. The Central Susquehanna Intermediate Unit IU16 provides the school with a wide variety of services like: specialized education for disabled students; state mandated training on recognizing and reporting child abuse; speech and visual disability services; criminal background check processing for prospective employees and professional development for staff and faculty.

== Extracurriculars ==
The Danville Area School District offers a wide variety of clubs, including forensics (speech and debate), activities and an extensive sports program. The district reports spending over $700,000 in 2013-14. Danville Area School District is a member of the Pennsylvania Heartland Athletic Conference for all athletics and participates under the rules and guidelines of the Pennsylvania Interscholastic Athletic Association. The Pennsylvania Heartland Athletic Conference is a voluntary association of 25 PIAA High Schools within the central Pennsylvania region.

=== Athletics ===
Boys

- Baseball - Varsity and JV teams AAA
- Basketball - AAAA
- Bowling - AAAAAA
- Cross Country - AA
- Football - Varsity and JV teams AAA
- Golf - AA
- Indoor Track and Field - AAAA
- Lacrosse - AA
- Soccer - AA
- Swimming and Diving - AA
- Tennis - AA
- Track and Field AA
- Wrestling - AA

Girls

- Basketball - AAAA
- Bowling - AAAAAA
- School sponsored non competitive cheerleading
- Cross Country - AA
- Field Hockey - A
- Indoor Track and Field - AAAA
- Lacrosse - AA
- Soccer (Fall) - AA
- Softball - AAAA
- Swimming and Diving - AA
- Girls' Tennis - AA
- Track and Field - AA

According to PIAA directory July 2016

=== Cross Country ===
| 2012 - Girls Cross Country won the Shikellamy Classic Invitational

| 2012 - Girls Cross Country won the AA District IV XC Championships

| 2012 - Girls Cross Country took 6th Place at The PIAA State Cross Country Championships

| 2012 - Guys Cross Country took 2nd in the Shikellamy Classic Invitational

| 2012 - Guys Cross Country took 2nd in the AA District IV XC Championships
