= Danville Area School District =

School district in Pennsylvania

Coordinates: 40.95990°N 76.60702°W

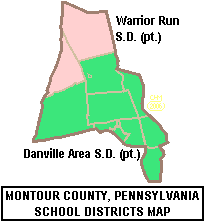

Address
- 733 Ironmen Lane Danville, Montour County and Northumberland County, Pennsylvania, 17821; United States

District information
- Type: Public
- Grades: PreK-12
- Superintendent: Dr. Molly Nied
- NCES District ID: 4207320

Students and staff
- Students: 2,162 (2022-23)
- Teachers: 171.00 (FTE)
- Student–teacher ratio: 12.64
- District mascot: Ironman
- Colors: Orange and purple

Other information
- State Classification: District of the 3rd class due to district population between 5,000 and 30,000 people
- Website: https://www.danvillesd.org/

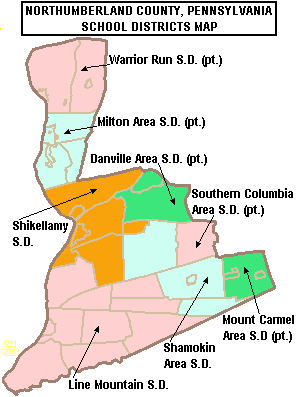
Map of Northumberland County, Pennsylvania Public School Districts

The Danville Area School District is a midsized, rural, public school district which spans portions of two counties in Pennsylvania. In Montour County it covers the Boroughs of Danville and Washingtonville and Cooper Township, Derry Township, Liberty Township, Mahoning Township, Mayberry Township, Valley Township and West Hemlock Township. In Northumberland County it covers the Borough of Riverside and Rush Township. The district encompasses approximately 120 square miles (310 km^{2}). According to 2000 federal census data, it served a resident population of 18,894. By 2010, the district's population declined to 18,765 people. The educational attainment levels for the Danville Area School District population (25 years old and over) were 89.8% high school graduates and 27.4% college graduates.

According to the Pennsylvania Budget and Policy Center, 28.8% of the district's pupils lived at 185% or below the Federal Poverty level as shown by their eligibility for the federal free or reduced price school meal programs in 2012. In 2009, the residents' per capita income was $20,247, while the median family income was $46,435. In the Commonwealth, the median family income was $49,501 and the United States median family income was $49,445, in 2010. In Montour County, the median household income was $45,255. By 2013, the median household income in the United States rose to $52,100.

Mascot and Colors

The district's school colors are Orange and Purple and its mascot is the Ironman. The Orange and Purple represent the colors of hot iron. Iron turns orange at forging temperatures and purple at even hotter casting temperatures. This is due to the historical significance of an iron refinery in downtown Danville. Danville Area was commissioned in 1900, within a few years of when the mill closed. The refinery stood idle for decades, but it was finally demolished in the 1930s.

== Schools ==
- Danville Area High School (Grades 9-12)
- Danville Middle School (Grades 6-8)
- Liberty Valley Intermediate Elementary School (Grades 3-5)
- Danville Area Primary Elementary School (Grades K-2)

Of the 4 elementary schools formerly operated by the district until June 2011, only Liberty Valley remains open today. Danville Elementary School, Riverside Elementary School, and Mahoning Cooper Elementary School all closed in the 2011 consolidation of the new Danville Area Primary Elementary School. The district provides an online learning option called Danville eLearning Cyber Academy.

== History ==
Shortly before the turn of the 20th century, the Commonwealth of Pennsylvania called for special districts acting as their own local government units to run the state's public school system, whereas counties, boroughs, townships, towns, and cities had previously been allowed to run schools. In 1900, the legislature commissioned Danville School District. Originally, the district covered only Danville, but it was granted an increasing geographical region as the state decommissioned surrounding districts. It expanded to cover all but the very northernmost townships of Montour County. Later, with the decommission and annexation of South Danville School District, it took up part of Northumberland County as well. In 1957, Danville School District was awarded the designation of "Area" in its name. In 2007, a U.S. News & World Report study rated Danville High School in the top 5% as one of the best public high schools in the United States of America. In 2010, the high school was no longer listed in the Top US Schools Listing.

== Extracurriculars ==
The district offers a wide variety of clubs, activities and an extensive sports program. Danville Area School District is a member of the Pennsylvania Heartland Athletic Conference for all athletics and participates under the rules and guidelines of the Pennsylvania Interscholastic Athletic Association. The Pennsylvania Heartland Athletic Conference is a voluntary association of 25 PIAA High Schools within the central Pennsylvania region.

The high school is also well known for its Forensics Team, which competes in the National Forensics League, National Catholic Forensics League, and Pennsylvania High School Speech League. Other high school groups include the student council (a member of the Pennsylvania Association of Student Councils), the Danville chapter of the Future Farmers of America, Students Against Destructive Decisions, the Spanish Club, Ski Club, the literary magazine, the Key Club, and yearbook club.

=== Sports ===
The district funds:

Boys

- Baseball - AA
- Basketball- AAA
- Bowling - AAAA
- Cross Country - Class AA
- Football - AA
- Golf -AA
- Indoor Track and Field - AAAA
- Lacrosse - AA
- Soccer - AA
- Swimming and Diving - Class AA
- Tennis - AA
- Track and Field - AA
- Wrestling - AA

Girls

- Basketball - AA
- Bowling - AAAA
- Cross Country - AA
- Field Hockey - AA
- Golf - AA
- Indoor Track and Field - AAAA
- Lacrosse (Spring) - AA
- Soccer (Fall) - AA
- Softball - AAA
- Swimming and Diving - AA
- Girls' Tennis - AA
- Track and Field

Middle School Sports

Boys

- Basketball
- Cross Country
- Football
- Soccer
- Track and Field
- Wrestling

Girls

- Basketball
- Cross Country
- Field Hockey
- Track and Field

- According to PIAA directory July 2012
