= Toby Run =

River in Pennsylvania, U.S.

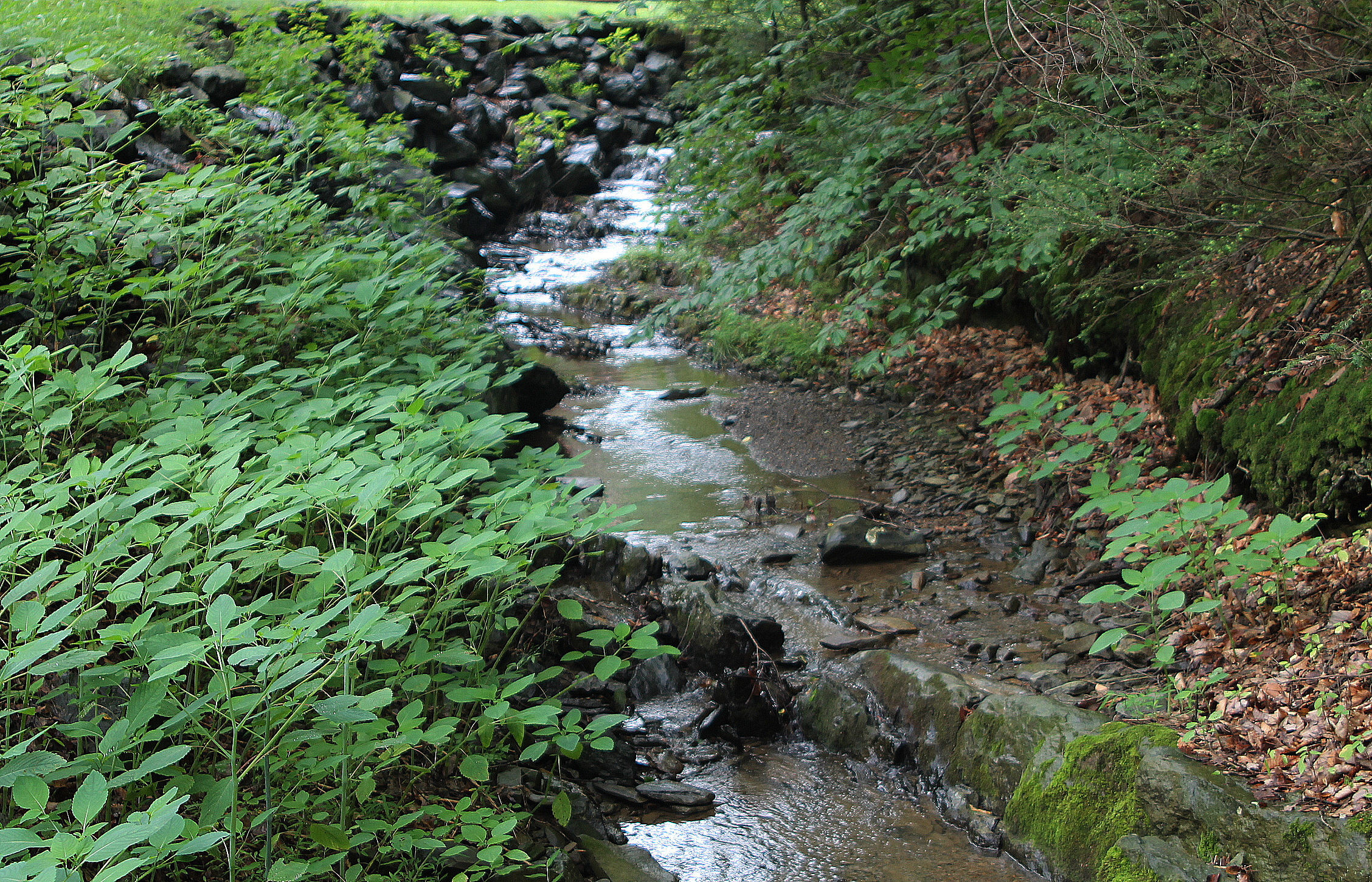
- Toby Run in its middle reaches

Physical characteristics
- Source
  - location: hills in Mahoning Township, Montour County, Pennsylvania
- Mouth
  - location: Susquehanna River in Mahoning Township, Montour County, Pennsylvania
  - coordinates: 40°56′36″N 76°35′57″W
  - elevation: 443 ft (135 m)
- Length: 1.7 mi (2.7 km)
- Basin size: 0.9 sq mi (2.3 km^{2})

Toby Run is a tributary of the Susquehanna River in Montour County, Pennsylvania. It is approximately 1.7 miles (2.7 km) long and is entirely in Mahoning Township. The stream's watershed has an area of 0.9 square miles (2.3 km^{2}). There are ravines known as the Toby Run Ravines in the vicinity of the stream. They are designated as a "Locally Significant" site in the Montour County Natural Areas Inventory. Additionally, the Danville State Hospital is located in the area of the stream.

== Course ==
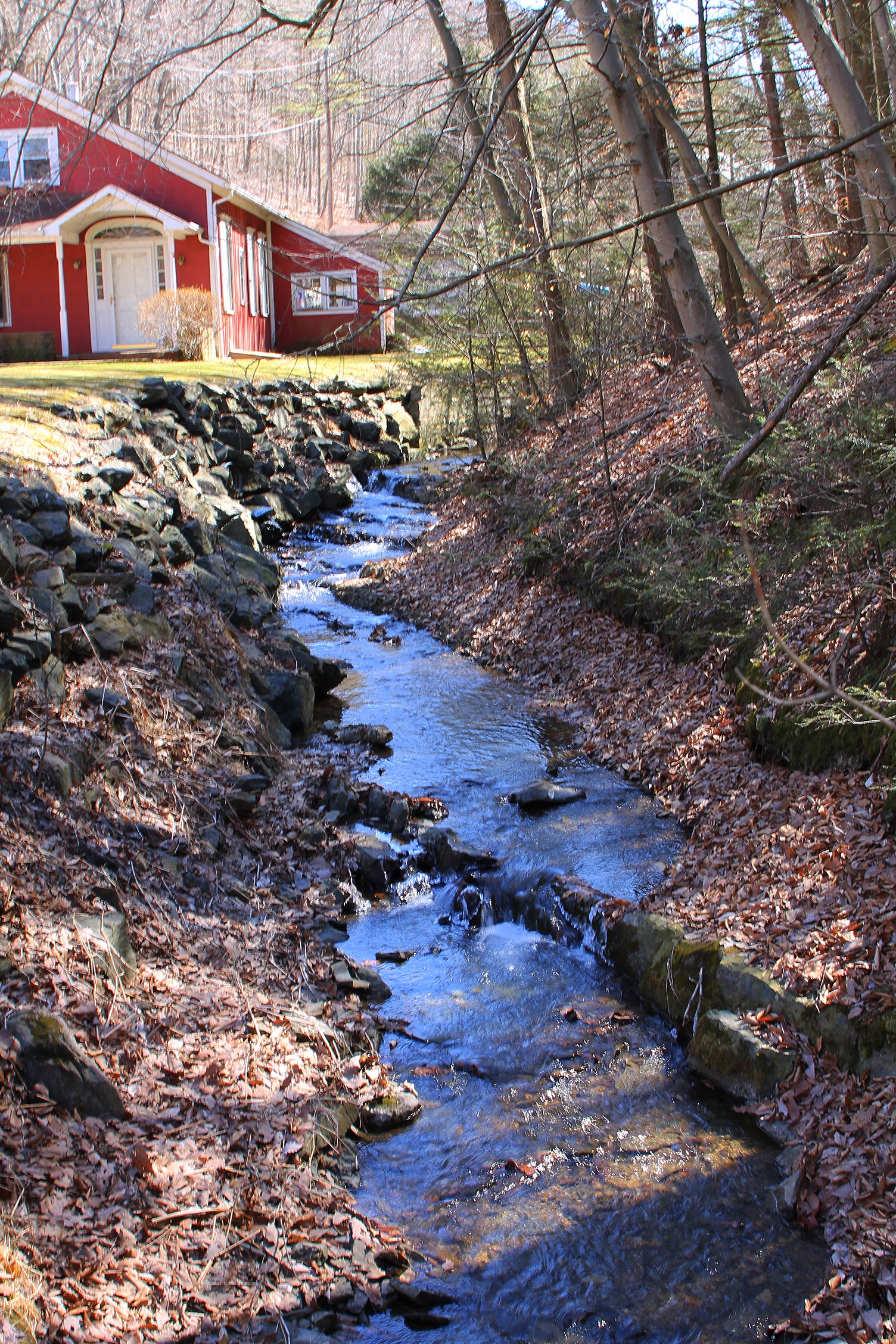
Toby Run in late March

Toby Run begins in hills in southern Mahoning Township. It flows southwest and then west or northwest for a short distance before making a sharp turn southwest. The stream then passes by a reservoir and a state hospital and leaves the hills that it started in. Shortly after this, it reaches its confluence with the Susquehanna River near the southern edge of Mahoning Township.

Toby Run joins the Susquehanna River 138.56 miles (222.99 km) upstream of its mouth.

== Geography and geology ==
Toby Run flows through a group of ravines for at least part of its distance. The ravines are known as the Toby Run Ravines and are located in Mahoning Township and Cooper Township. The ravines are relatively narrow. There is also a plateau in the watershed of the stream.

The elevation of Toby Run near its mouth is 443 feet (135 m) above sea level.

== Watershed ==
The watershed of Toby Run has an area of 0.9 square miles (2.3 km^{2}).

Toby Run is close to Danville.

== History ==
Historically, there was a community known as Toby Town in the vicinity of Toby Run and a nearby insane asylum. It was named after a "large and powerful" Native American known as Toby. It is unknown if this community was near the stream's mouth or on a nearby ridge.

The grounds of the Danville State Hospital is in the watershed of Toby Run. In the late 1800s, the gas works of the State Lunatic Asylum were at the mouth of the stream. In 1913, the stream was proposed for use as a secondary water supply for the Danville State Hospital. A pumping station was also located near the stream.

== Biology ==
Most of the plants in the Toby Run ravines are hemlock. However, the vegetation in the ravines, which includes forests, is described as "interesting and diverse" in the Montour County Natural Areas Inventory. Trees such as tulip poplar, beech, and sugar maple are also present in the area. The canopy in the area consists of hemlock and northern hardwood trees. Non-native species such as Norway maple, multiflora rose, garlic mustard, autumn olive, and tree-of-heaven are slowly become more prevalent in the ravine.

There are a total of 14 species of trees in the ravine of Toby Run. There are eight shrub species in the ravine. These include alternate-leaved dogwood, red willow, multiflora rose, spicebush, American elderberry, wild hydrangea, autumn olive, and witch hazel. Additionally, there are 22 species of herbs in the ravine. These include dame's rocket, jewelweed, skunk cabbage, Indian cucumber-root, and numerous others.

An insect known as the hemlock woolly adelgid poses a threat to the hemlock trees in the vicinity of Toby Run.

The Toby Run Ravines are designated as a "Locally Significant" site in the Montour County Natural Areas Inventory. The entire watershed of Toby Run is designated as a coldwater fishery.

== See also ==
- Mahoning Creek (Susquehanna River), next tributary of the Susquehanna River going downriver
- Logan Run, next tributary of the Susquehanna River going upriver
- List of rivers of Pennsylvania
