= Little Roaring Creek =

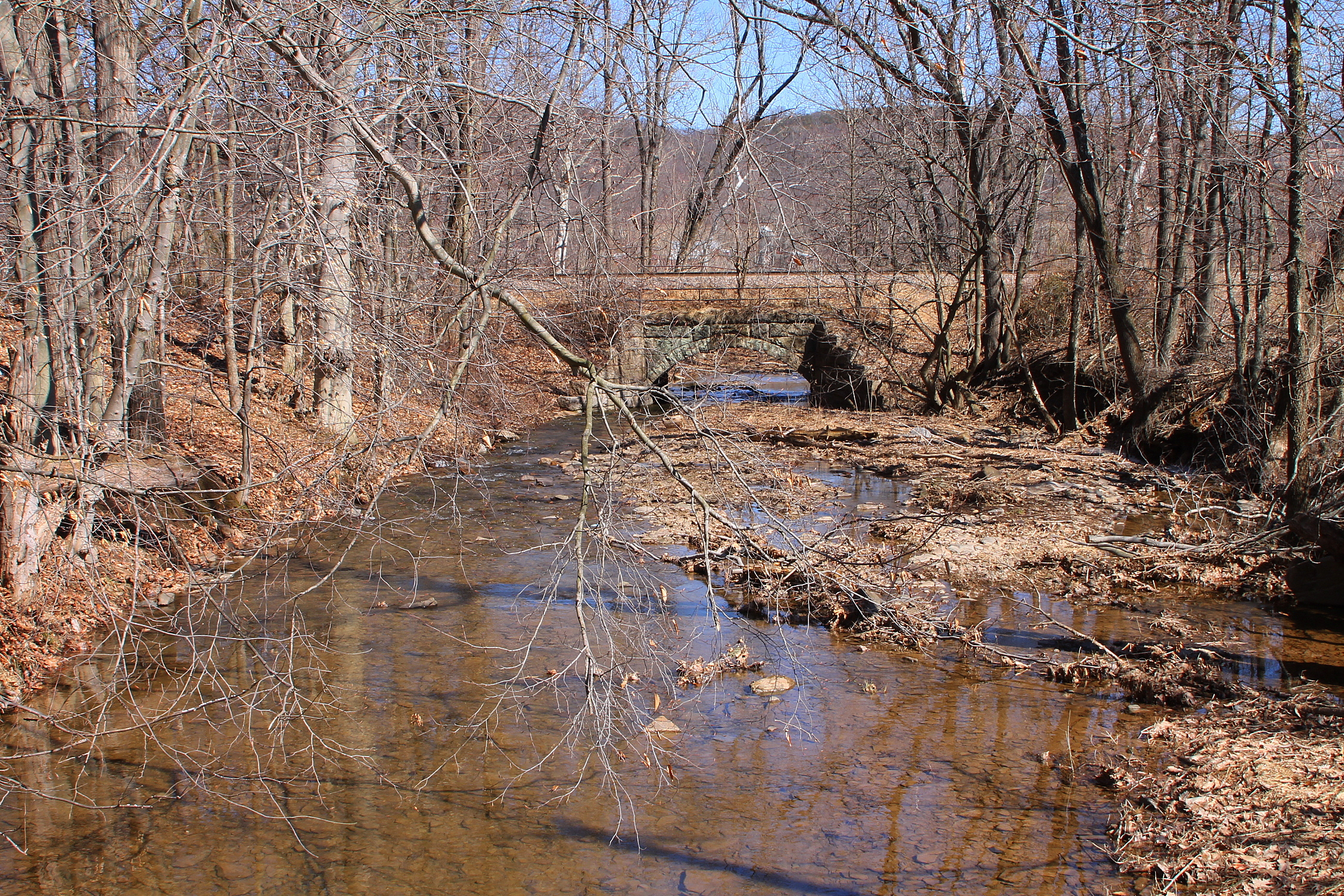
- Little Roaring Creek looking downstream

Physical characteristics
- Source
  - location: hill in southwestern Mayberry Township, Pennsylvania
  - elevation: 980 to 1,000 feet (300 to 300 m)
- Mouth
  - location: Susquehanna River on the border between Mayberry Township, Pennsylvania and Rush Township, Northumberland County, Pennsylvania
  - coordinates: 40°56′16″N 76°33′26″W
  - elevation: 440 ft (130 m)
- Length: 4.4 mi (7.1 km)
- Basin size: 5.98 mi^{2} (15.5 km^{2})

Basin features
- Progression: Susquehanna River → Chesapeake Bay

Little Roaring Creek is a tributary of the Susquehanna River in Montour County and Northumberland County, in Pennsylvania, in the United States. It is approximately 4.4 miles (7.1 km) long and flows through Mayberry Township, Montour County and Rush Township, Northumberland County. The watershed of the creek has an area of 5.98 square miles (15.5 km^{2}). The creek is considered to be a coldwater fishery and a migratory fishery. At least two mills historically existed on it. Additionally, a number of bridges cross the creek.

== Course ==
Little Roaring Creek begins on a hill in the southwestern corner of Mayberry Township, Montour County. It flows west for a short distance to the border between Mayberry Township, Montour County and Rush Township, Northumberland County. At this point, the creek turns north-northwest and flows closely parallel to the border between Montour County and Northumberland County and roughly parallel to State Route 2119. The creek flows through a valley for several miles, eventually turning north and slightly east. It eventually leaves its valley and almost immediately reaches its confluence with the Susquehanna River.

Little Roaring Creek joins the Susquehanna River 140.88 miles (226.72 km) upstream of its mouth.

== Geography ==
The elevation near the mouth of Little Roaring Creek is 440 feet (130 m) above sea level. The elevation of the source of the creek is between 980 feet (300 m) and 1,000 feet (300 m) above sea level.

Little Roaring Creek forms part of the border between Montour County and Northumberland County. The creek enters the Susquehanna River on the river's left bank. There are glacial drift deposits at the headwaters of the creek. The drift is fairly thick and have been described as "exceptionally heavy". Additionally, a moraine is present. The glacial drift is at an elevation of nearly 1,000 feet (300 m) above sea level.

== Watershed ==
The watershed of Little Roaring Creek has an area of 5.98 square miles (15.5 km^{2}). The creek drains a portion of Montour County's southern panhandle. It is in the eastern portion of Northumberland County and is in the United States Geological Survey quadrangle of Danville. The community of Union Corners is slightly south of the headwaters of Little Roaring Creek.

== History ==
Little Roaring Creek formed a portion of a township border as early as 1788. At some point in the past, R. Davidson constructed a sawmill on the creek. It was abandoned some time before 1915. A gristmill owned by Jacob Swank also historically existed on the creek. It was still operational as late as 1915, when it was owned by S. Cromley. James Bird purchased a tract of land on the creek in the 1700s or 1800s and his son Ziba farmed the tract.

A concrete stringer bridge crosses Little Roaring Creek 4 miles (6.4 km) north of Elysburg. This bridge is 33.1 feet (10.1 m) long. Another bridge crosses the creek 4 miles (6.4 km). This bridge is a concrete tee beam bridge that is 45.9 feet (14.0 m) long. It was built in 1922 and repaired in 1978. Another concrete tee beam bridge was built over the creek in 1928 and is 23.0 feet (7.0 m) long. A prestressed box beam bridge was built in 1940 and repaired in 1994 and is 38.1 feet (11.6 m) long. A concrete channel beam bridge was built over the creek in 1954 and repaired in 2012. This bridge is 24.9 feet (7.6 m) long.

A bridge carrying Route 2001 over Little Roaring Creek received a weight restriction in 2013.

Montour County once submitted a grant request to the Pennsylvania Department of Environmental Protection for the purpose of creating a stormwater management plan for the watershed of Little Roaring Creek and a number of other watersheds. The creek was added to the Geographic Names Information System on August 2, 1979.

== Biology ==
Little Roaring Creek is considered to be a Coldwater Fishery and a migratory fishery. Its unnamed tributaries also have this designation. Portions of the creek have a damaged or missing riparian buffer. The Montour County Natural Areas Inventory has suggested planting trees that are native to the area along the creek.

== See also ==
- Logan Run, next tributary of the Susquehanna River going downriver
- Roaring Creek (Pennsylvania), next tributary of the Susquehanna River going upriver
- List of rivers of Pennsylvania
