= Mahoning Township, Pennsylvania =

Mahoning Township is the name of some places in the U.S. state of Pennsylvania:

- Mahoning Township, Armstrong County, Pennsylvania
- Mahoning Township, Carbon County, Pennsylvania
- Mahoning Township, Lawrence County, Pennsylvania
- Mahoning Township, Montour County, Pennsylvania

== See also ==
- East Mahoning Township, Indiana County, Pennsylvania
- North Mahoning Township, Pennsylvania
- South Mahoning Township, Pennsylvania
- West Mahoning Township, Pennsylvania
- Mahoning Township (disambiguation)
