= White Hall Creek =

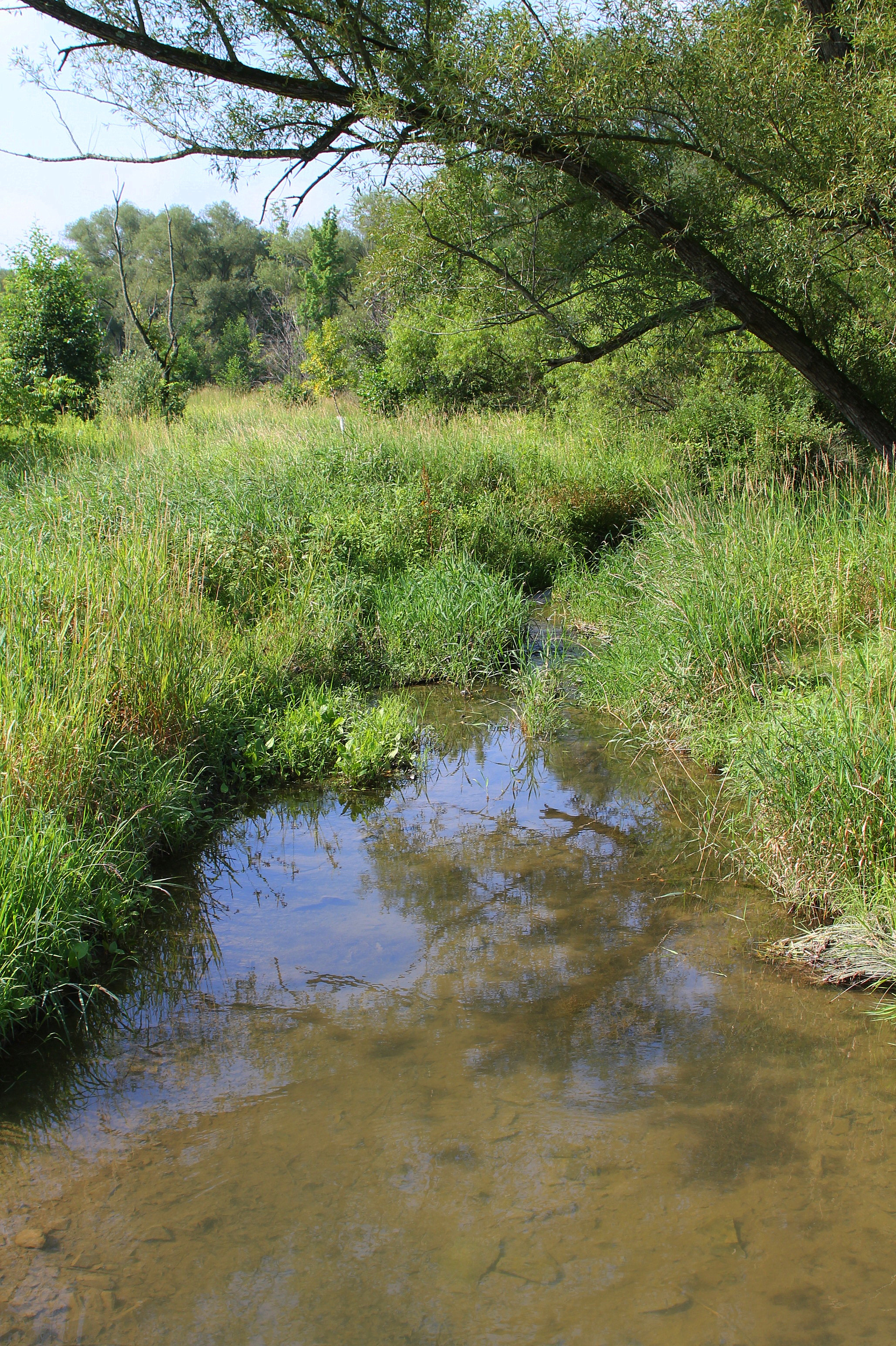
- White Hall Creek looking downstream

Physical characteristics
- Source
  - location: base of a hill in Madison Township, Columbia County, Pennsylvania
  - elevation: between 900 and 920 feet (270 and 280 m)
- Mouth
  - location: East Branch Chillisquaque Creek in Derry Township, Montour County, Pennsylvania
  - coordinates: 41°05′02″N 76°38′59″W
  - elevation: 545 ft (166 m)
- Length: 3.8 mi (6.1 km)
- Basin size: 2.31 sq mi (6.0 km^{2})

Basin features
- Progression: East Branch Chillisquaque Creek → Chillisquaque Creek → West Branch Susquehanna River → Susquehanna River → Chesapeake Bay
- Tributaries
  - left: three unnamed tributaries

White Hall Creek is a tributary of East Branch Chillisquaque Creek in Columbia County and Montour County, in Pennsylvania, in the United States. It is approximately 3.8 miles (6.1 km) long and flows through Madison Township in Columbia County and Anthony Township and Derry Township. The watershed of the creek has an area of 2.31 square miles (6.0 km^{2}). All streams in its watershed are impaired by siltation due to agriculture. The creek is a Warmwater Fishery.

== Course ==
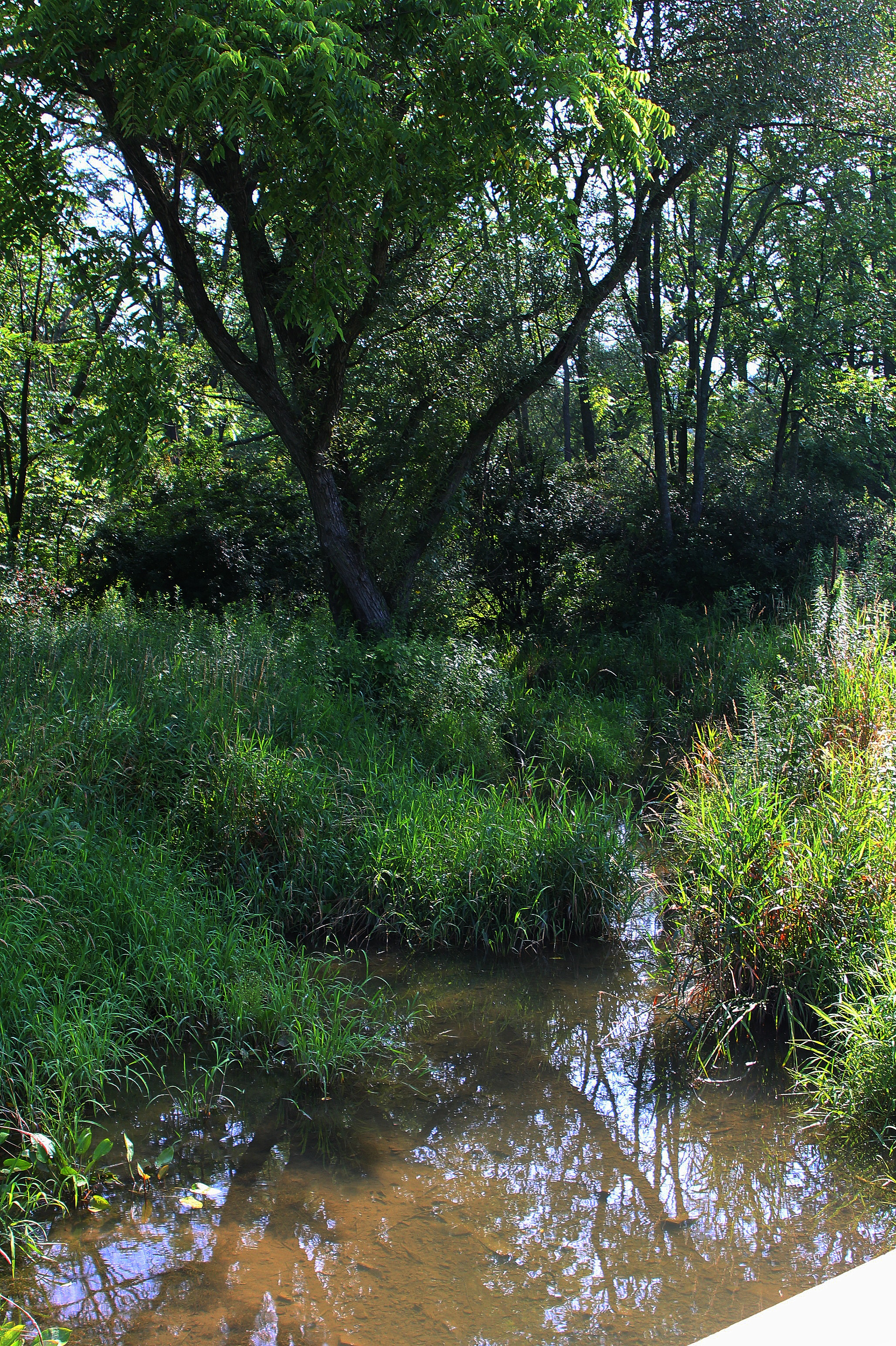
White Hall Creek looking upstream

White Hall Creek begins at the base of a hill in Madison Township, Columbia County. It flows south-southwest for a short distance before turning south-southeast for a short distance. The creek then turns south-southwest for several tenths of a mile, exiting Columbia County.

Upon exiting Columbia County, White Hall Creek enters Anthony Township, Montour County. It turns south-southwest for several tenths of a mile, crossing Pennsylvania Route 44 and receiving an unnamed tributary from the left. The creek then turns west-southwest for a few tenths of a mile, receiving another unnamed tributary from the left before turning south. After some distance, it receives a third unnamed tributary from the left and several tenths of a mile further downstream, it turns west-southwest. After a short distance, the creek reaches its confluence with East Branch Chillisquaque Creek.

White Hall Creek joins East Branch Chillisquaque Creek 0.94 miles (1.51 km) upstream of its mouth.

== Hydrology ==
The entire length of White Hall Creek and all the other streams in its watershed are designated as impaired waterbodies. The cause of the impairment is siltation and the source is agriculture.

== Geography and geology ==
The elevation near the mouth of White Hall Creek is 545 feet (166 m) above sea level. The elevation of the creek's source is between 900 and 920 feet (270 and 280 m) above sea level.

== Watershed and biology ==
The watershed of White Hall Creek has an area of 2.31 square miles (6.0 km^{2}). The mouth of the creek is in the United States Geological Survey quadrangle of Washingtonville. However, its source is in the quadrangle of Hugesville. The creek also passes through the quadrangle of Millville. There are a total of 5.43 miles (8.74 km) of streams in the watershed.

White Hall Creek is designated as a Warmwater Fishery. The water quality of the creek would be improved by the addition of further riparian buffering in some reaches.

== History ==
White Hall Creek was entered into the Geographic Names Information System on August 2, 1979. Its identifier in the Geographic Names Information System is 1191276.

A bridge carrying Preserve Road over White Hall Creek was built in 1937. It was 17 feet (5.2 m) long and was located 3.5 miles (5.6 km) east of Pennsylvania Route 54 in Anthony Township, Montour County. However, by 2012, a Pennsylvania Department of Transportation bridge crew had replaced the bridge with a precast concrete box culvert.

White Hall Creek was listed as impaired in 1998. The total maximum daily load date is 2011.

== See also ==
- List of rivers of Pennsylvania
