= Cooper Township, Pennsylvania =

Cooper Township is the name of some places in the U.S. state of Pennsylvania:

- Cooper Township, Clearfield County, Pennsylvania
- Cooper Township, Montour County, Pennsylvania
