= Mexico, Pennsylvania =

Mexico may refer to:

- Mexico, Juniata County, Pennsylvania
- Mexico, Montour County, Pennsylvania
