= Logan Run =

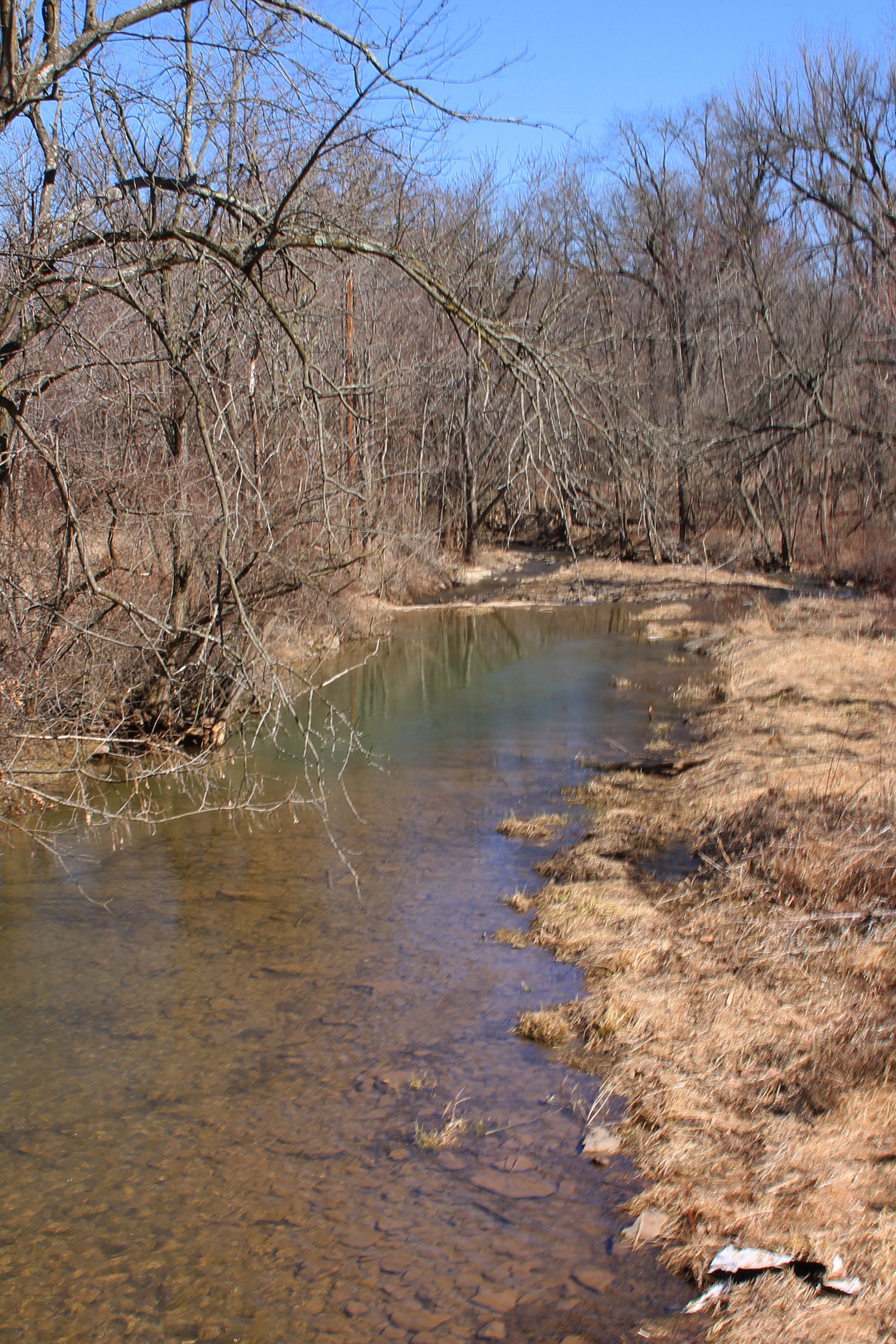
- Logan Run looking downstream

Physical characteristics
- Source
  - location: Shamokin Hill near in Rush Township, Northumberland County, Pennsylvania
  - elevation: 960 to 980 feet (290 to 300 m)
- Mouth
  - location: Susquehanna River in Rush Township, Northumberland County, Pennsylvania
  - coordinates: 40°56′20″N 76°35′36″W
  - elevation: 440 ft (130 m)
- Length: 5.7 mi (9.2 km)
- Basin size: 8.70 sq mi (22.5 km^{2})

Basin features
- Progression: Susquehanna River → Chesapeake Bay

Logan Run (also known as Logan's Run) is a tributary of the Susquehanna River in Northumberland County, Pennsylvania, in the United States. It is approximately 5.7 miles (9.2 km) long and flows through Rush Township. The watershed of the stream has an area of 8.70 square miles (22.5 km^{2}) and is in the Lower Susquehanna River drainage basin. The stream is crossed by five bridges and was home to a gristmill and sawmill at some point in the past. It is considered to be a coldwater fishery and a migratory fishery. Rock of the Catskill Formation, the Pocono Formation, and the Hamilton Formation are present in the watershed.

== Course ==
Logan Run begins on Shamokin Hill, near the southern border of Rush Township. It flows west in a valley for a short distance before turning north for a few tenths of a mile. The stream then turns northwest for some distance and its valley becomes broader and deeper. It then turns roughly north for a few miles, receiving four unnamed tributaries. At this point, the stream crosses State Route 2004 and turns northwest for a short distance. Its valley broadens further. The stream then turns north and receives an unnamed tributary before turning northeast and receiving another unnamed tributary. It then turns north and receives two more unnamed tributaries before turning north-northeast for several tenths of a mile. At this point, the stream crosses Pennsylvania Route 54 and flows north for several tenths of a mile before reaching its confluence with the Susquehanna River.

Logan Run joins the Susquehanna River 138.96 miles (223.63 km) upstream of its mouth.

== Hydrology, geography, and geology ==
The elevation near the mouth of Logan Run is 440 feet (130 m) above sea level. The elevation of the stream's source is between 960 feet (290 m) and 980 feet (300 m) above sea level.

There are beds of rock containing rounded boulders on Logan Run at an elevation of 725 feet (221 m) above sea level. Angular pieces of several rock formations occur at this area. These include sandstone of the Hamilton Formation, the Pocono Formation, and conglomerate of the Catskill Formation. Some of these pieces have diameters of more than 2 feet (0.61 m). No glacial action has occurred in the area.

Sandstone of the Catskill Formation has been found in the hills in the vicinity of Logan Run.

Logan Run enters the Susquehanna River on the river's left bank.

Nutrients containing nitrogen have been observed in Logan Run.

== Watershed ==
The watershed of Logan Run has an area of 8.70 square miles (22.5 km^{2}). The stream is in the United States Geological Survey quadrangle of Danville. It is one of the main streams in Rush Township. The stream is in the Lower Susquehanna River drainage basin. The Hydrologic Unit Code of the stream is 020501071003.

== History ==
A gristmill and sawmill was constructed on Logan Run by Daniel Montgomery. The mill was operated by John Gilliam at some point in the past.

A total of five bridges more than 20 feet (6.1 m) long cross Logan Run, four of which were built in the 1930s and three of which were built in 1934 and 1935. A concrete tee beam bridge was built over the creek in 1930 and is 24.0 feet (7.3 m) long. A concrete slab bridge and a steel stringer bridge were built over the stream in 1934. They are 21.0 feet (6.4 m) long and 32.2 feet (9.8 m) long, respectively. Another bridge was built over it in 1935. It is a concrete tee beam bridge that is 44.0 feet (13.4 m) long. A prestressed box beam bridge was also built over the stream in 1985. It is 49.9 feet (15.2 m) long and carries Pennsylvania Route 54.

== Biology ==
Logan Run is considered to be a coldwater fishery and a migratory fishery. It is inhabited by fish of the family Salmonidae and other coldwater fish.

== See also ==
- Little Roaring Creek, next tributary of the Susquehanna River going upriver
- Toby Run, next tributary of the Susquehanna River going downriver
