= Mahoning Township =

Mahoning Township may refer to:

- Mahoning Township, Armstrong County, Pennsylvania
- Mahoning Township, Montour County, Pennsylvania
- Mahoning Township, Lawrence County, Pennsylvania
- Mahoning Township, Carbon County, Pennsylvania
