= Mechanicsville, Montour County, Pennsylvania =

Unincorporated community in Pennsylvania, US

Mechanicsville
- Census-designated place
- Location within the state of Pennsylvania Mechanicsville (the United States)
- Coordinates: 40°57′58″N 76°35′27″W
- Country: United States
- State: Pennsylvania
- County: Montour

Area
  - Total: 2.0 sq mi (5.3 km^{2})
  - Land: 2.0 sq mi (5.3 km^{2})

Population (2000)
  - Total: 3,099
  - Density: 1,500/sq mi (580/km^{2})
- Time zone: UTC-5 (Eastern (EST))
  - Summer (DST): UTC-4 (EDT)

Mechanicsville is a former census-designated place (CDP) in Montour County, Pennsylvania, United States. The population was 3,099 at the 2000 census. It is part of the Bloomsburg-Berwick micropolitan area. As of the 2010 census, Mechanicsville was not listed as a CDP or as any populated place.

== History ==
Mechanicsville was originally settled by workmen. The Bloomsburg Trolley Line passed through Mechanicsville. A silk mill was built in the community in 1911.

== Geography ==
Mechanicsville is located at 40°57′58″N 76°35′27″W (40.966240, -76.590781). According to the United States Census Bureau, the CDP has a total area of 2.0 square miles (5.3 km^{2}), all land.

Mechanicsville's terrain is mostly rolling hills. The majority of Mechanicsville's land is residential.

== Demographics ==
As of the census of 2000, there were 3,099 people, 1,172 households, and 732 families residing in the CDP. The population density was 1,517.4 inhabitants per square mile (585.9/km^{2}). There were 1,236 housing units at an average density of 605.2 per square mile (233.7/km^{2}). The racial makeup of the CDP was 95.03% White, 0.90% African American, 0.03% Native American, 3.10% Asian, 0.45% from other races, and 0.48% from two or more races. Hispanic or Latino of any race were 1.03% of the population.

There were 1,172 households, out of which 27.6% had children under the age of 18 living with them, 51.2% were married couples living together, 9.0% had a female householder with no husband present, and 37.5% were non-families. 35.4% of all households were made up of individuals, and 18.3% had someone living alone who was 65 years of age or older. The average household size was 2.20 and the average family size was 2.85.

In the CDP the population was spread out, with 20.4% under the age of 18, 4.1% from 18 to 24, 21.5% from 25 to 44, 22.3% from 45 to 64, and 31.7% who were 65 years of age or older. The median age was 47 years. For every 100 females, there were 70.8 males. For every 100 females age 18 and over, there were 63.8 males.

The median income for a household in the CDP was $42,750, and the median income for a family was $54,559. Males had a median income of $46,719 versus $31,638 for females. The per capita income for the CDP was $22,528. About 3.2% of families and 9.6% of the population were below the poverty line, including 7.7% of those under age 18 and 20.4% of those age 65 or over.
