= Mexico, Montour County, Pennsylvania =

Unincorporated community in Pennsylvania, U.S.

Coordinates: 41°01′16″N 76°44′54″W

Mexico is an unincorporated community, in Montour County, Pennsylvania, United States. It lies at an elevation of 541 feet (165 m). The community is part of the Bloomsburg-Berwick micropolitan area.

== Demographics ==
Mexico's population, according to the 2010 Census is 472, consisting of 235 males and 237 females. The population consists of 464 (98.3%) Whites, 6 (1.3%) Hispanics, 1 Asian (0.2%), and 1 Pacific Islander (0.2%). In 2009, the estimated median household income for Mexico was $58,227.
