= West Hemlock Township, Pennsylvania =

Township in Pennsylvania, United States

Coordinates: 41°01′00″N 76°34′29″W

- Township
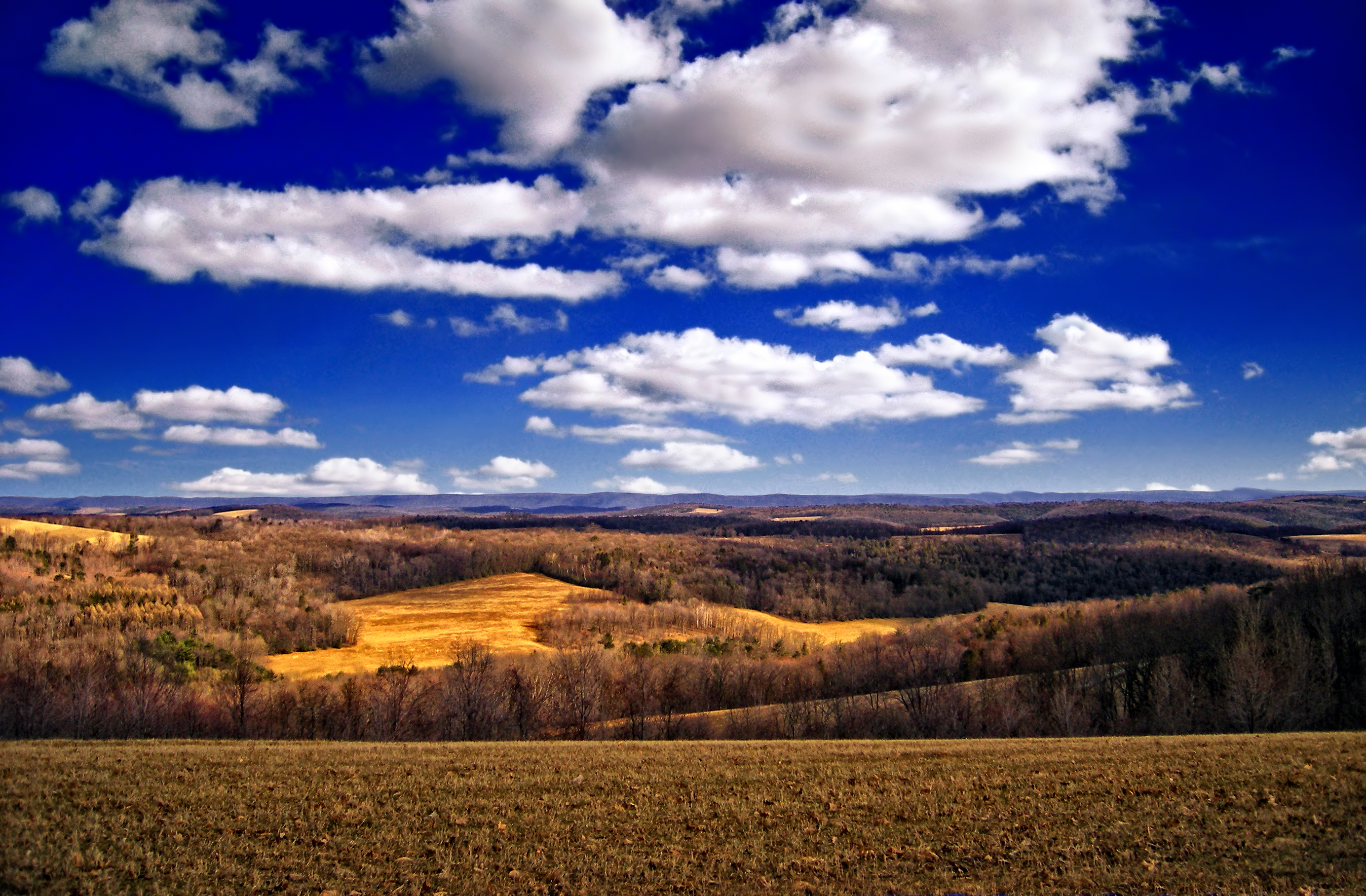
- The rolling hills of West Hemlock Township

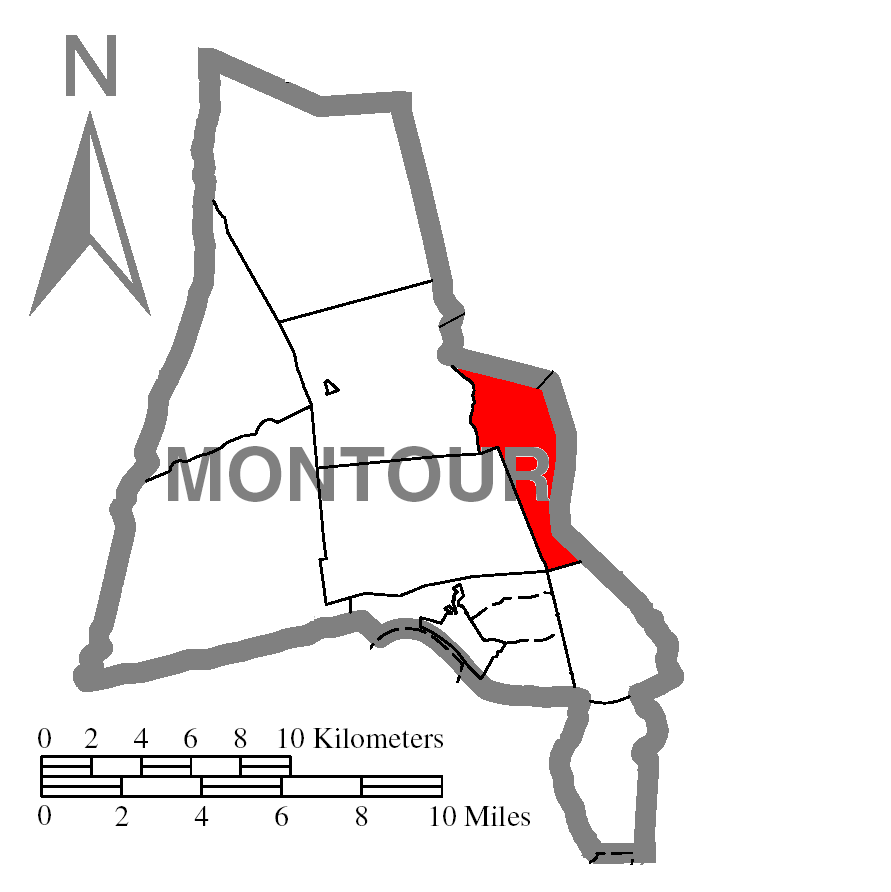
- Map of Montour County, Pennsylvania Highlighting West Hemlock Township

- Map of Montour County, Pennsylvania
- Country: United States
- State: Pennsylvania
- County: Montour
- Incorporated: 1853

Area
  - Total: 7.71 sq mi (19.97 km^{2})
  - Land: 7.70 sq mi (19.94 km^{2})
  - Water: 0.012 sq mi (0.03 km^{2})

Population (2020)
  - Total: 450 ▼
  - Estimate (2021): 447
  - Density: 65.3/sq mi (25.22/km^{2})
- FIPS code: 42-093-83144

West Hemlock Township is a township in Montour County, Pennsylvania, United States.

== Geography ==
According to the United States Census Bureau, the township has a total area of 7.7 square miles (20.0 km^{2}), all of it land.

== Demographics ==
Historical population
Census	Pop.	Note	%±
2000	489		—
2010	503		2.9%
2020	450		−10.5%
2021 (est.)	447		−0.7%
U.S. Decennial Census

As of the census of 2000, there were 489 people, 168 households, and 150 families residing in the township.

The population density was 63.2 inhabitants per square mile (24.4/km^{2}). There were 182 housing units at an average density of 23.5/sq mi (9.1/km^{2}).

The racial composition of the township was 99.18% White, 0.61% African American, and 0.20% Asian.

There were 168 households, out of which 38.1% had children under the age of eighteen living with them; 76.8% were married couples living together, 7.7% had a female householder with no husband present, and 10.7% were non-families. 10.7% of all households were made up of individuals, and 3.0% had someone living alone who was sixty-five years of age or older.

The average household size was 2.91, and the average family size was 3.05.

In the township, the population was spread out, with 27.2% under the age of eighteen, 7.2% from eighteen to twenty-four, 31.7% from twenty-five to forty-four, 25.2% from forty-five to sixty-four, and 8.8% who were sixty-five years of age or older. The median age was thirty-nine years.

For every 100 females, there were 109.9 males. Among those aged 18 and older, there were 113.2 males per 100 females.

The median income for a household in the township was $45,625, and the median income for a family was $50,000. Males had a median income of $32,500 compared to $24,375 for females.

The per capita income for the township was $18,428.

Roughly 7.3% of families and 7.9% of the population were living below the poverty line, including 9.5% of those who were under the age of eighteen and 10.6% of those who were aged sixty-five or older.
