= Mayberry Township, Pennsylvania =

Township in Pennsylvania, United States

Coordinates: 40°55′00″N 76°32′29″W

- Township
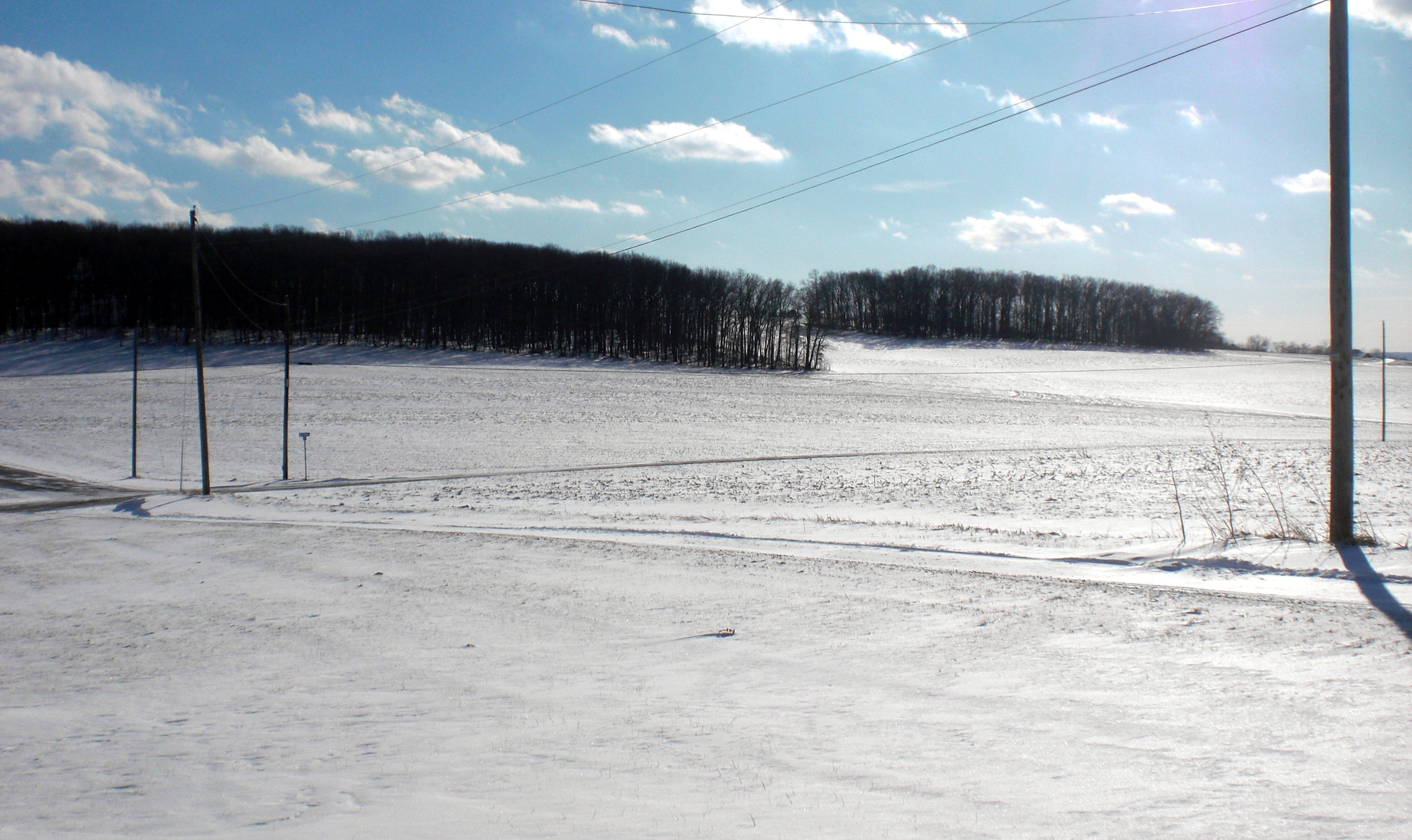
- Winter in Mayberry Township

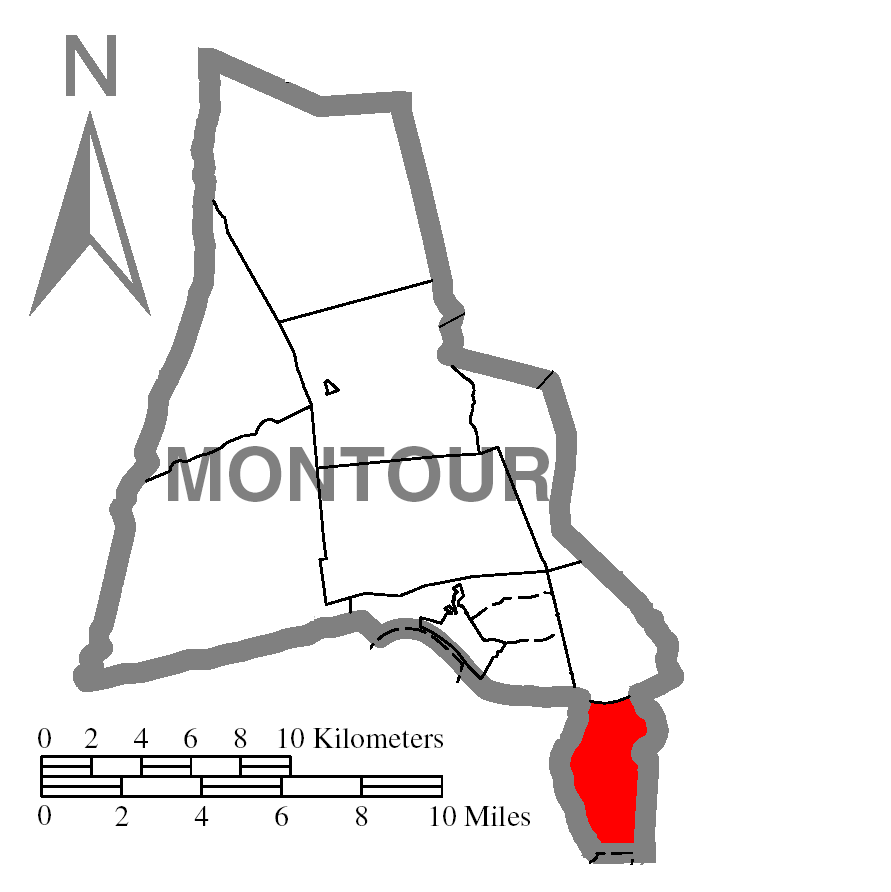
- Map of Montour County, Pennsylvania Highlighting Mayberry Township

- Map of Montour County, Pennsylvania
- Country: United States
- State: Pennsylvania
- County: Montour
- Settled: 1783
- Incorporated: 1850

Area
  - Total: 7.25 sq mi (18.77 km^{2})
  - Land: 7.04 sq mi (18.23 km^{2})
  - Water: 0.21 sq mi (0.54 km^{2})

Population (2020)
  - Total: 232 ▼
  - Estimate (2021): 234
  - Density: 36.1/sq mi (13.93/km^{2})
- FIPS code: 42-093-48152

Mayberry Township is a township in Montour County, Pennsylvania, United States.

== Geography ==
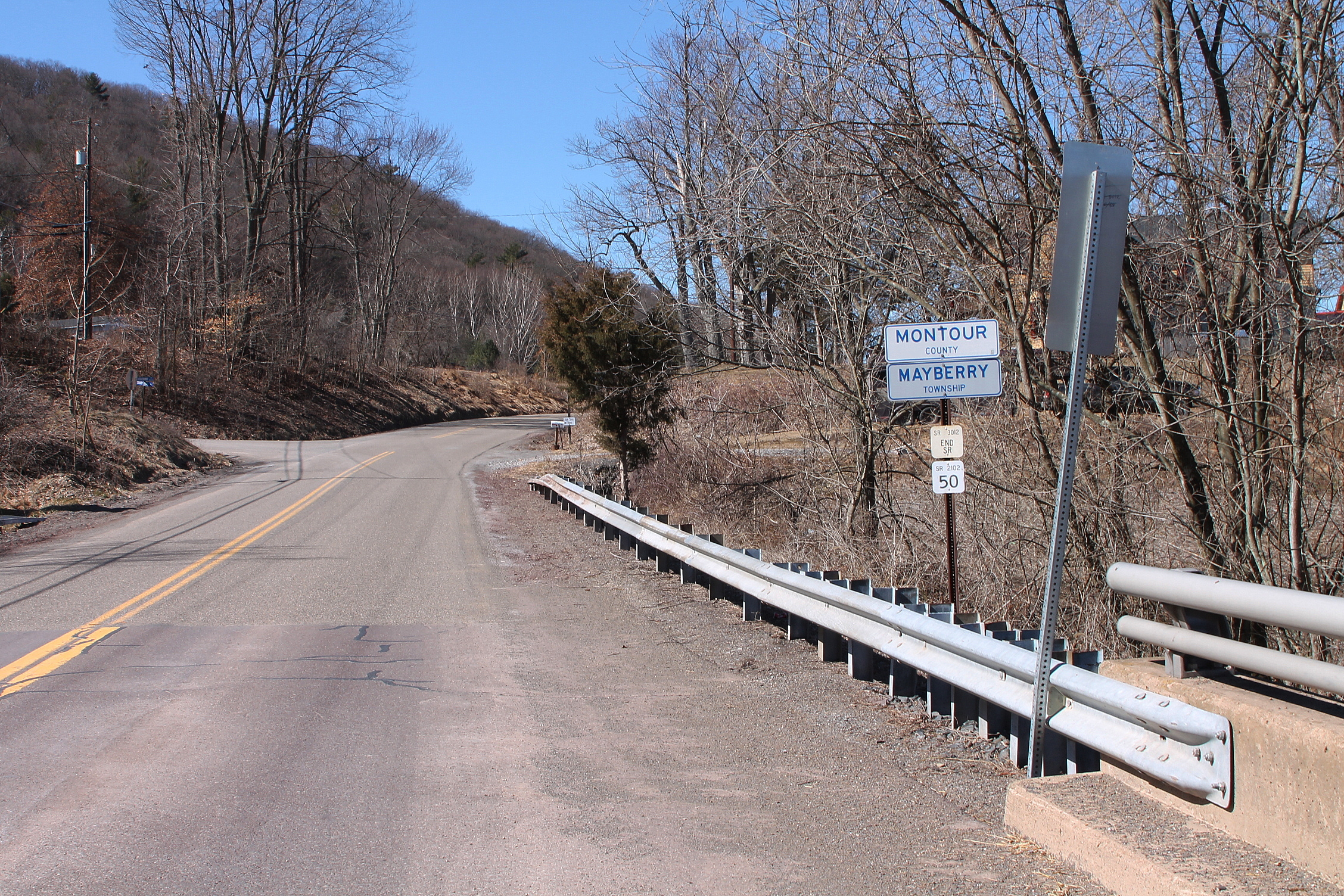
Montour County line at Mayberry Township

Mayberry Township is the only municipality in Montour County on the east side of the North Branch of the Susquehanna River and there is no direct access to the remainder of the county.

According to the United States Census Bureau, the township has an area of 7.2 square miles (18.7 km^{2}), of which 7.1 square miles (18.3 km^{2}) is land and 0.1 square miles (0.3 km^{2}) (1.80%) is water.

== Demographics ==
Historical population
Census	Pop.	Note	%±
2000	244		—
2010	250		2.5%
2020	232		−7.2%
2021 (est.)	234		0.9%
U.S. Decennial Census

As of the census of 2000, there were 244 people, 97 households, and 73 families residing in the township.

The population density was 34.5 inhabitants per square mile (13.3/km^{2}). There were 110 housing units at an average density of 15.5/sq mi (6.0/km^{2}).

The racial makeup of the township was 94.67% White, 2.05% African American, 0.82% Asian, 2.05% from other races, and 0.41% from two or more races. Hispanic or Latino of any race were 2.46% of the population.

There were 97 households, out of which 29.9% had children under the age of eighteen living with them; 64.9% were married couples living together, 8.2% had a female householder with no husband present, and 24.7% were non-families. 18.6% of all households were made up of individuals, and 6.2% had someone living alone who was sixty-five years of age or older.

The average household size was 2.52 and the average family size was 2.92.

In the township the population was spread out, with 20.9% under the age of eighteen, 5.7% from eighteen to twenty-four, 36.9% from twenty-five to forty-four, 25.0% from forty-five to sixty-four, and 11.5% who were sixty-five years of age or older. The median age was thirty-nine years.

For every one hundred females, there were 96.8 males. For every one hundred females aged eighteen and over, there were 94.9 males.

The median income for a household in the township was $41,875, and the median income for a family was $41,250. Males had a median income of $28,438 compared with that of $23,542 for females.

The per capita income for the township was $18,451.

Roughly 2.8% of families and 4.1% of the population were living below the poverty line, including 17.2% of those under the age of eighteen. None of those aged sixty-five or over were living in poverty.
