= Derry Township, Montour County, Pennsylvania =

Township in Pennsylvania, United States

Coordinates: 41°03′00″N 76°37′59″W

Derry Township, Mountour County, Pennsylvania
- Township
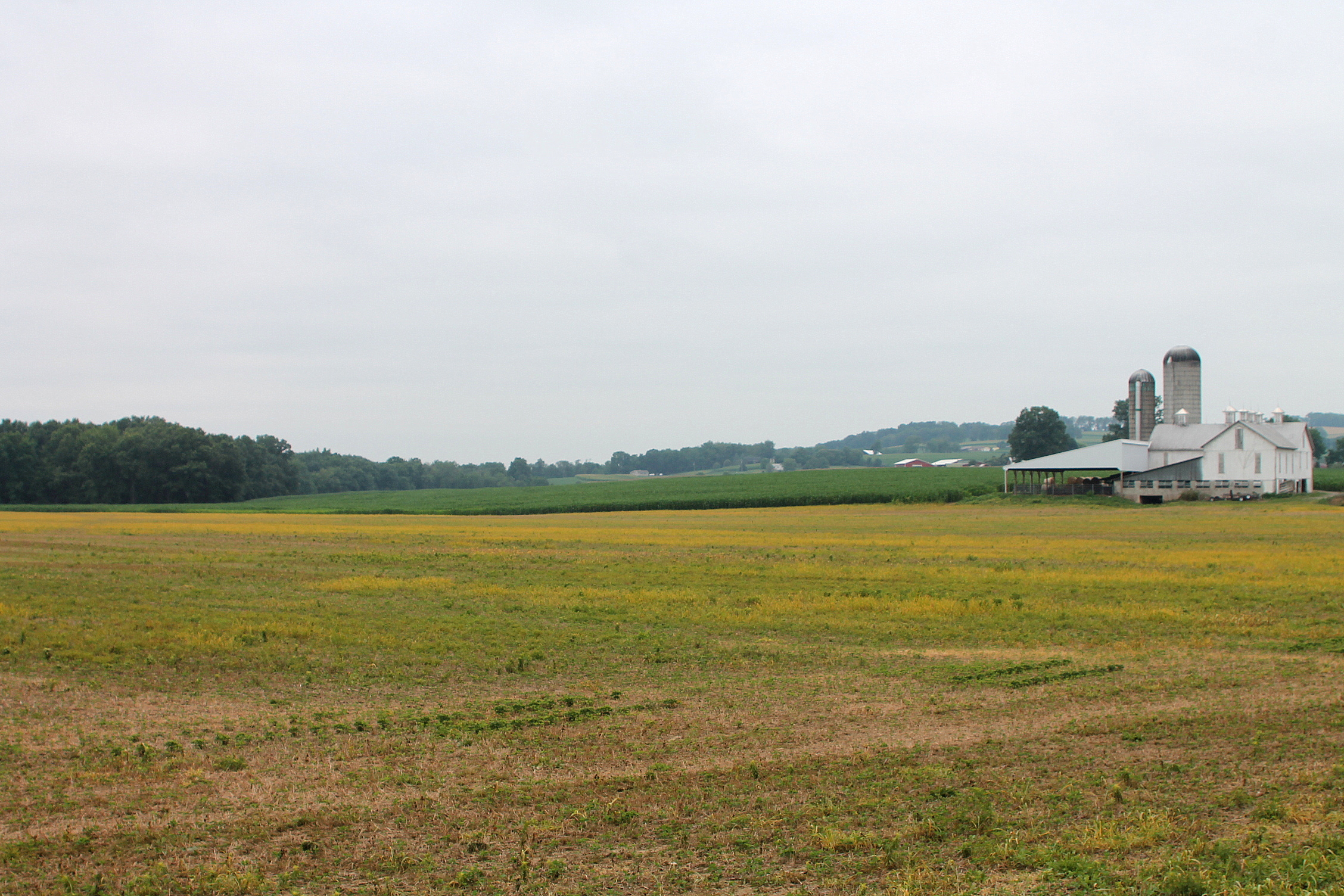
- Field in Derry Township

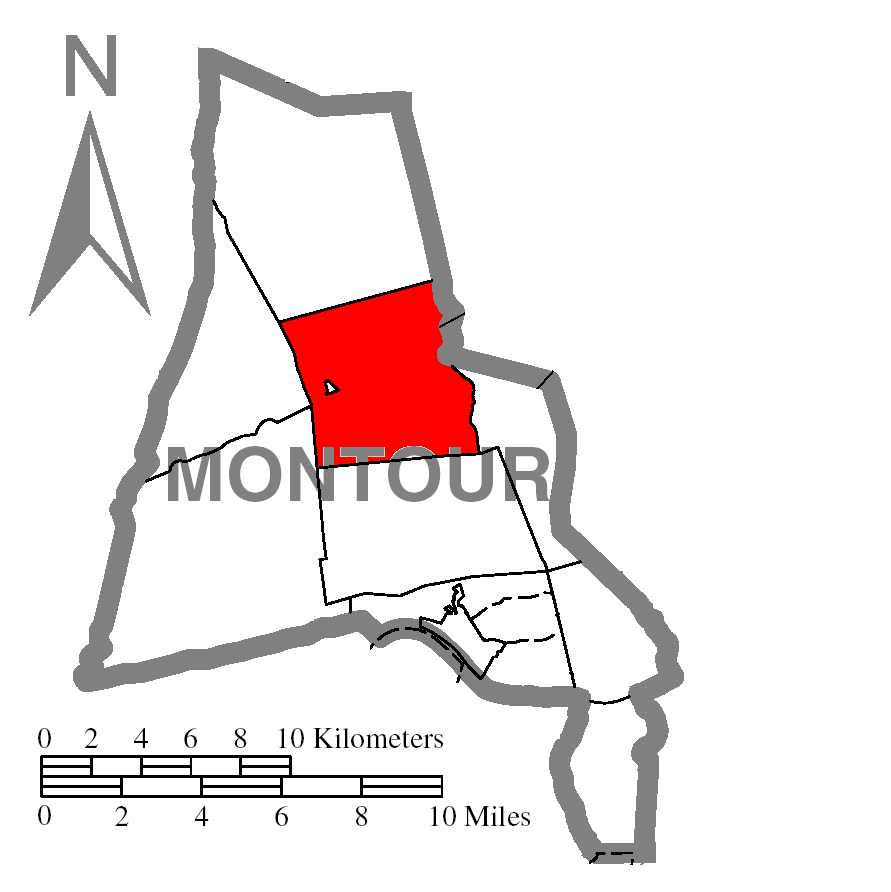
- Map of Montour County, Pennsylvania highlighting Derry Township

- Map of Montour County, Pennsylvania
- Country: United States
- State: Pennsylvania
- County: Montour
- Settled: 1775
- Incorporated: 1786

Area
  - Total: 16.36 sq mi (42.38 km^{2})
  - Land: 16.06 sq mi (41.60 km^{2})
  - Water: 0.30 sq mi (0.78 km^{2})

Population (2020)
  - Total: 1,090 ▼
  - Estimate (2021): 1,082
  - Density: 70.3/sq mi (27.14/km^{2})
- FIPS code: 42-093-18952
- Website: derrytwp.org

Derry Township is a township in Montour County, Pennsylvania, United States.

It was named after the city of Derry in Northern Ireland.

== Geography ==
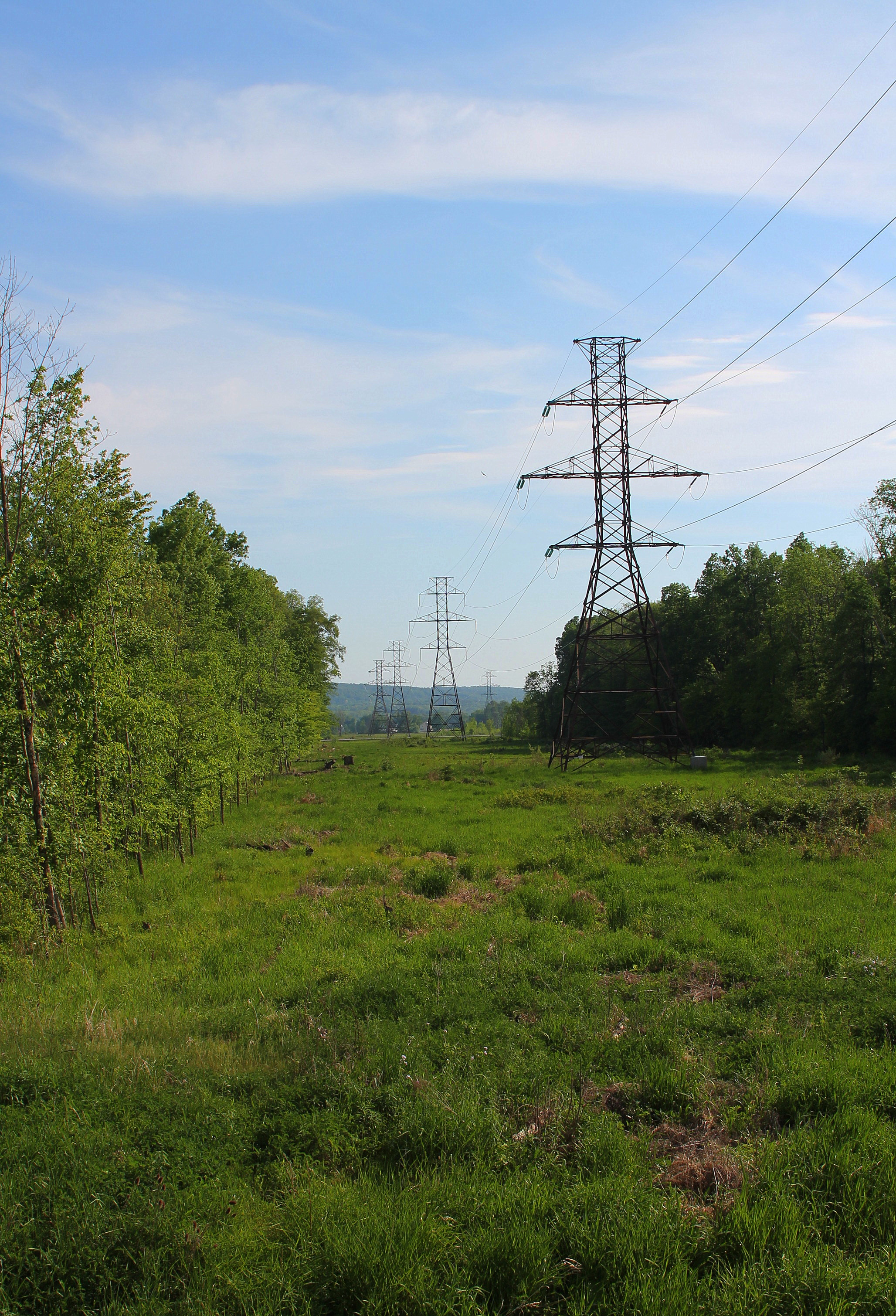
Power lines in Derry Township

According to the U.S. Census Bureau, the township has a total area of 16.4 square miles (42 km^{2}), 16.1 square miles (42 km^{2}) of which is land and 0.2 square miles (0.52 km^{2}) (1.47%) of which is water.

== Demographics ==
Historical population
Census	Pop.	Note	%±
2000	1,215		—
2010	1,130		−7.0%
2020	1,090		−3.5%
2021 (est.)	1,082		−0.7%
U.S. Decennial Census

As of the census of 2000, there were 1,215 people, 448 households, and 332 families residing in the township. The population density was 75.4 inhabitants per square mile (29.1/km^{2}). There were 494 housing units at an average density of 30.7 per square mile (11.9/km^{2}). The racial makeup of the township was 97.45% White, 1.89% African American, 0.16% Asian, and 0.49% from two or more races.

There were 448 households, out of which 36.4% had children under the age of 18 living with them, 60.5% were married couples living together, 9.8% had a female householder with no husband present, and 25.7% were non-families. 21.2% of all households were made up of individuals, and 7.8% had someone living alone who was 65 years of age or older. The average household size was 2.69 and the average family size was 3.14.

In the township the population was spread out, with 29.5% under the age of 18, 7.8% from 18 to 24, 29.4% from 25 to 44, 23.1% from 45 to 64, and 10.2% who were 65 years of age or older. The median age was 34 years. For every 100 females, there were 103.2 males. For every 100 females age 18 and over, there were 96.6 males.

The median income for a household in the township was $33,696, and the median income for a family was $37,426. Males had a median income of $31,100 versus $20,341 for females. The per capita income for the township was $15,161. About 6.6% of families and 13.9% of the population were below the poverty line, including 24.5% of those under age 18 and 4.9% of those age 65 or over.
