= Cooper Township, Montour County, Pennsylvania =

Township in Pennsylvania, United States

Coordinates: 40°58′00″N 76°33′59″W

Cooper Township, Mountour County, Pennsylvania
- Township
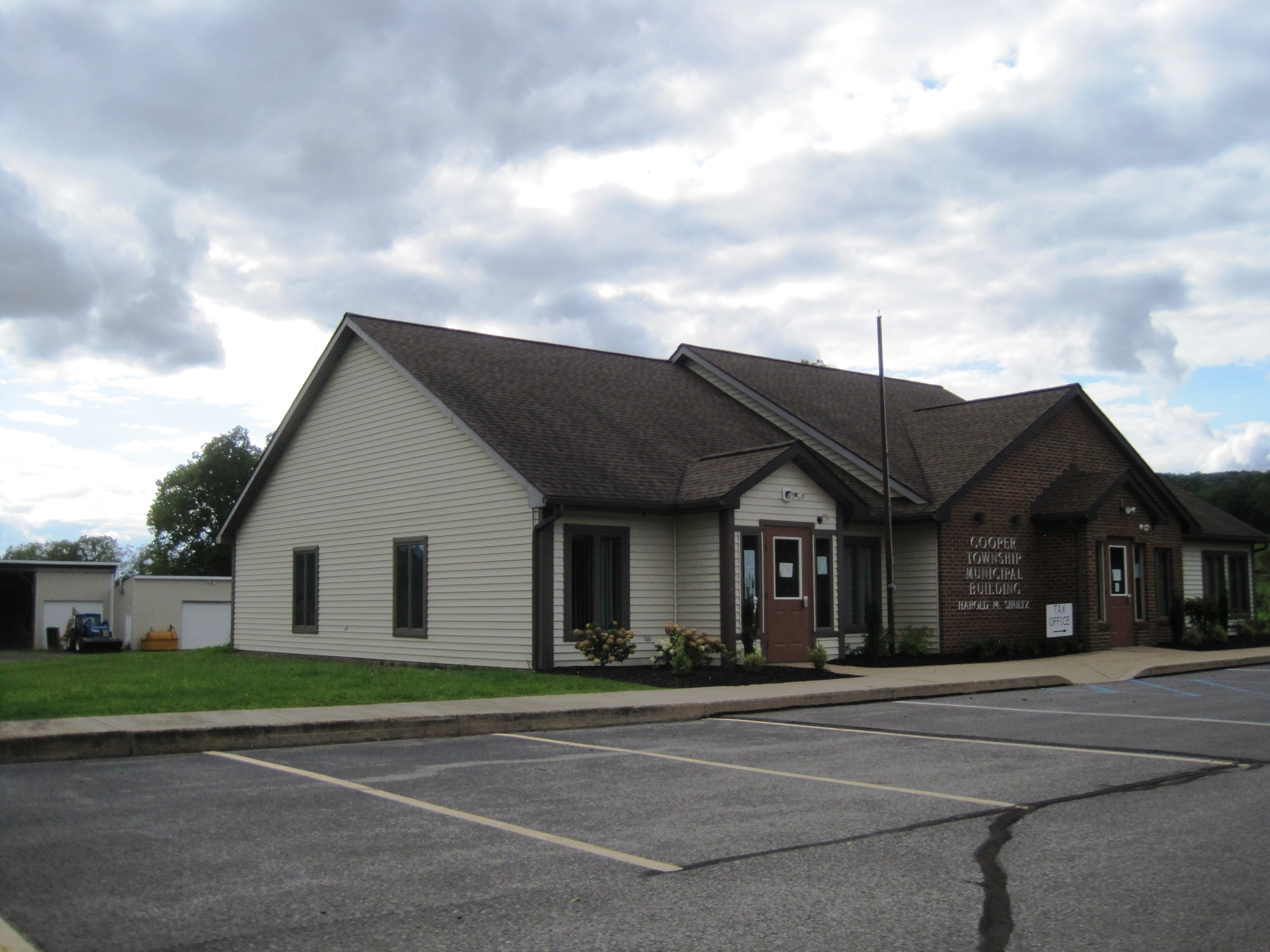
- Township Municipal Building

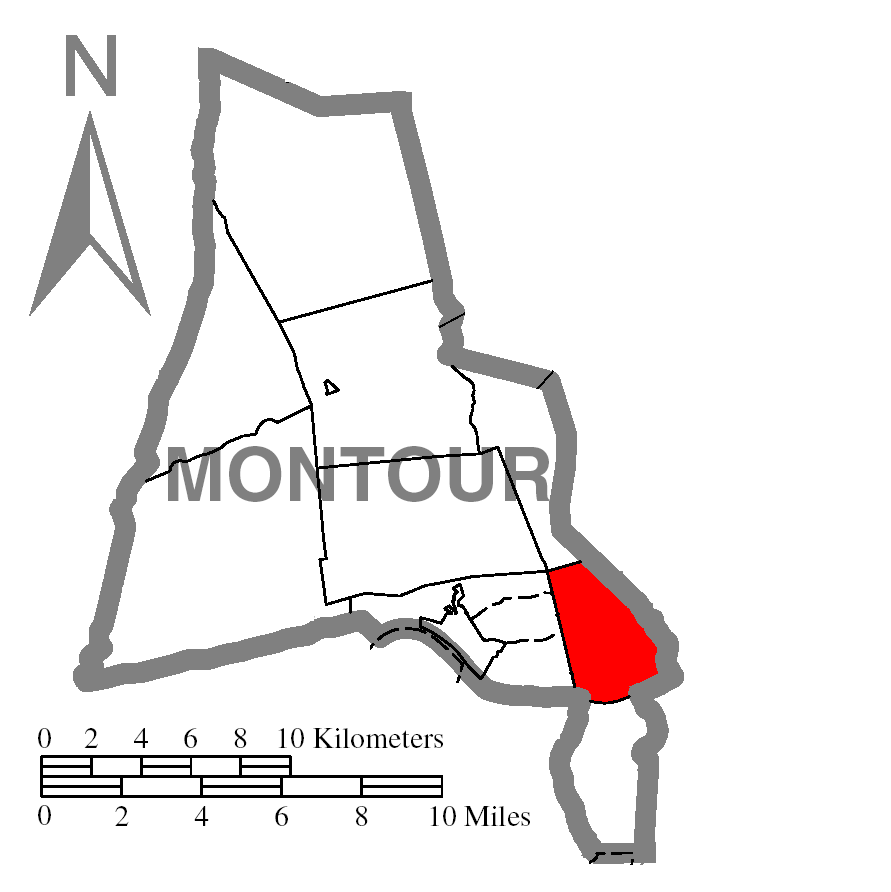
- Map of Montour County, Pennsylvania Highlighting Cooper Township

- Map of Montour County, Pennsylvania
- Country: United States
- State: Pennsylvania
- County: Montour
- Incorporated: 1850

Area
  - Total: 7.20 sq mi (18.66 km^{2})
  - Land: 6.87 sq mi (17.80 km^{2})
  - Water: 0.33 sq mi (0.85 km^{2})

Population (2020)
  - Total: 939 ▲
  - Estimate (2021): 937
  - Density: 137.3/sq mi (53.02/km^{2})
- FIPS code: 42-093-16048
- Website: cooper-township.org

Cooper Township is a township in Montour County, Pennsylvania, United States.

== History ==
The first settlers in the township were a family by the name of Krum. A church was built in the township in 1856. Historically, there were numerous mineral deposits, such as iron ore and limestone in the township. There were also limestone kilns in the past.

== Geography ==
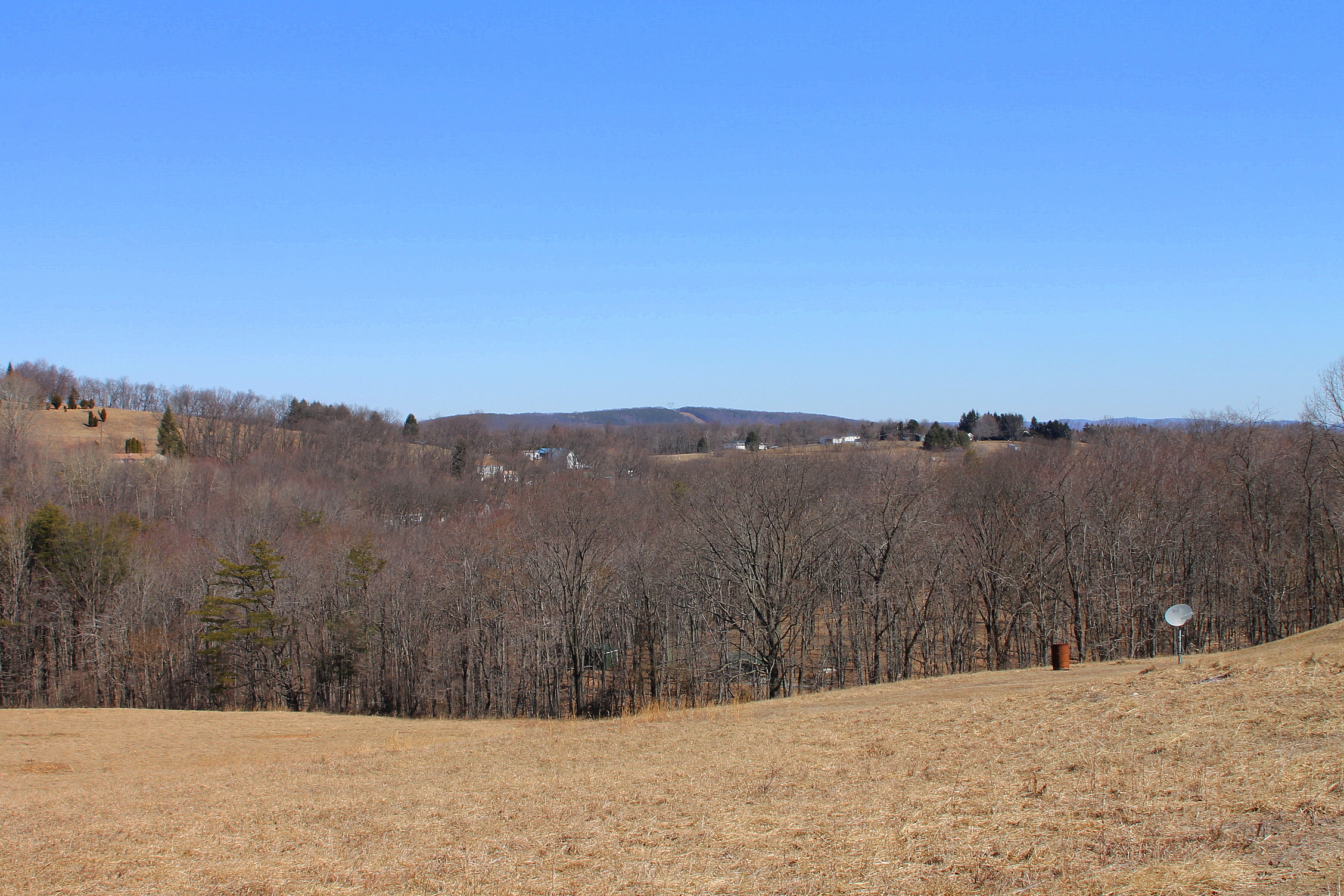
Scenery of Cooper Township

According to the United States Census Bureau, the township has a total area of 7.2 square miles (19 km^{2}), of which 6.9 square miles (18 km^{2}) is land and 0.3 square miles (0.78 km^{2}) (3.89%) is water.

Cooper Township's terrain is hilly in the north and south, and flat in the central part of the township. The township's land is a mix of forest and farmland.

== Demographics ==
Historical population
Census	Pop.	Note	%±
2000	966		—
2010	932		−3.5%
2020	939		0.8%
2021 (est.)	937		−0.2%
U.S. Decennial Census

As of the census of 2000, there were 966 people, 397 households, and 283 families residing in the township. The population density was 139.7 inhabitants per square mile (53.9/km^{2}). There were 420 housing units at an average density of 60.8 per square mile (23.5/km^{2}). The racial makeup of the township was 98.65% White, 0.93% African American, 0.31% Asian, and 0.10% from two or more races. Hispanic or Latino of any race were 0.52% of the population.

There were 397 households, out of which 30.2% had children under the age of 18 living with them, 60.5% were married couples living together, 6.8% had a female householder with no husband present, and 28.7% were non-families. 23.2% of all households were made up of individuals, and 9.1% had someone living alone who was 65 years of age or older. The average household size was 2.43 and the average family size was 2.83.

In the township the population was spread out, with 24.2% under the age of 18, 3.5% from 18 to 24, 29.0% from 25 to 44, 28.3% from 45 to 64, and 15.0% who were 65 years of age or older. The median age was 42 years. For every 100 females, there were 94.4 males. For every 100 females age 18 and over, there were 93.1 males.

The median income for a household in the township was $34,712, and the median income for a family was $40,938. Males had a median income of $30,000 versus $21,360 for females. The per capita income for the township was $18,813. About 6.7% of families and 10.1% of the population were below the poverty line, including 9.4% of those under age 18 and 10.3% of those age 65 or over.
