= Montour County, Pennsylvania =

County in Pennsylvania, United States

- County
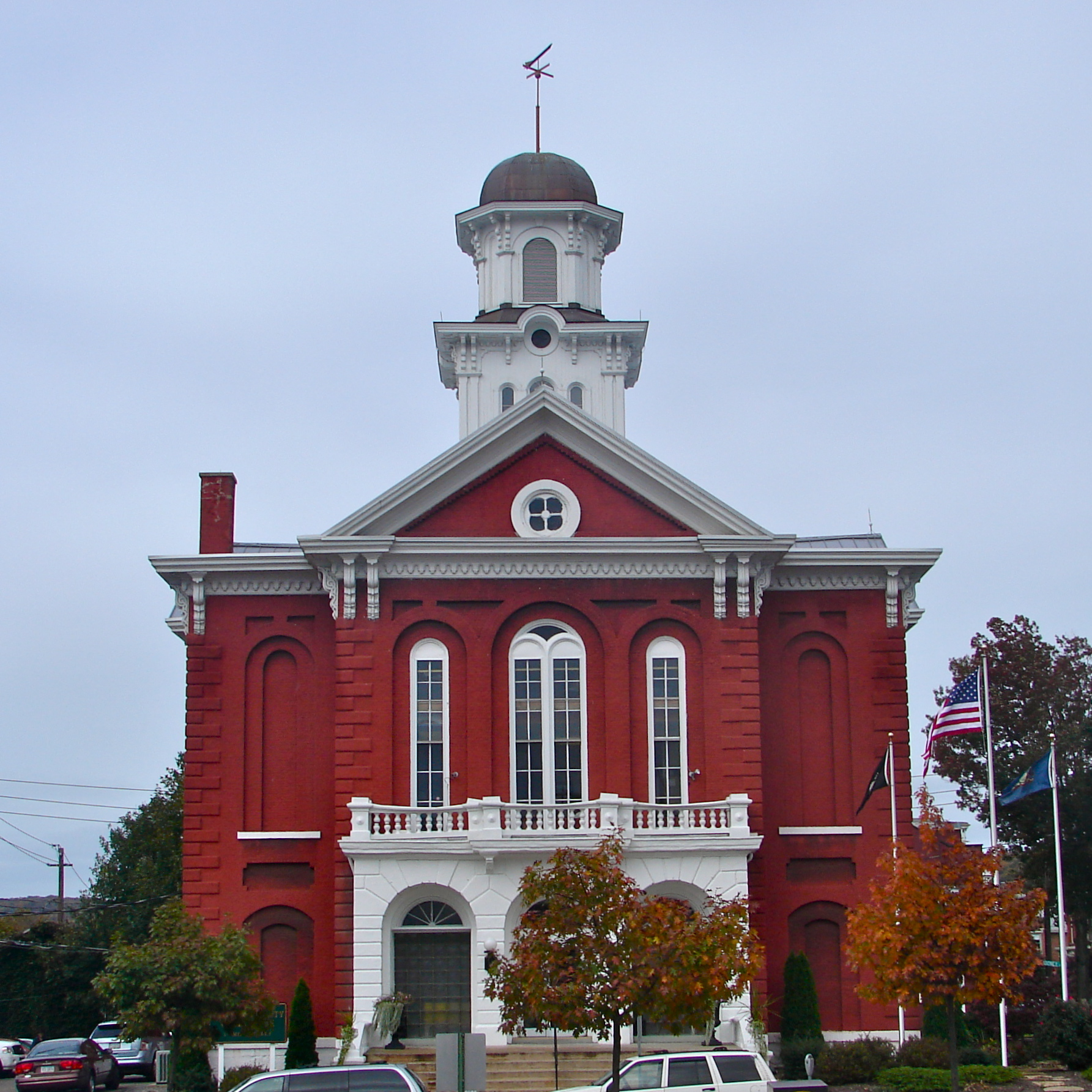
- Montour County Courthouse in Danville

- Logo

- Location within the U.S. state of Pennsylvania
- Coordinates: 41°02′N 76°40′W
- Country: United States
- State: Pennsylvania
- Founded: May 3, 1850
- Named for: Andrew Montour
- Seat: Danville
- Largest borough: Danville

Area
  - Total: 132 sq mi (340 km^{2})
  - Land: 130 sq mi (340 km^{2})
  - Water: 2.1 sq mi (5.4 km^{2}) 1.6%

Population (2020)
  - Total: 18,136
  - Estimate (2025): 17,868 ▼
  - Density: 137/sq mi (53/km^{2})
- Time zone: UTC−5 (Eastern)
  - Summer (DST): UTC−4 (EDT)
- Congressional district: 9th
- Website: www.montourcounty.gov

Montour County is a county in the Commonwealth of Pennsylvania. As of the 2020 census, the population was 18,136. Its county seat is Danville. The county is named for Andrew Montour, a prominent Métis interpreter who served with George Washington during the French and Indian War. It encompasses 132 sq mi, making it the smallest county by land area in the state. The county is part of the Central Pennsylvania region of the state. (Note: Includes Centre, Lycoming, Northumberland, Columbia, Mifflin, Union, Snyder, Clinton, Juniata and Montour Counties)

Montour County is part of the Bloomsburg-Berwick, PA Metropolitan Statistical Area.

== History ==
Fort Bosley, located near the present day border of Derry Township and the Borough of Washingtonville, was the county's only fortified location during the Revolutionary War.

== Geography ==
According to the U.S. Census Bureau, the county has a total area of 132 square miles (340 km^{2}), of which 130 square miles (340 km^{2}) is land and 2.1 square miles (5.4 km^{2}) (1.6%) is water. It is the smallest county by area in Pennsylvania. A total of 45% of Montour County is wooded. The entire county sits inside the Susquehanna River watershed. The other major streams in Montour County include Chillisquaque Creek and Mahoning Creek.

=== Climate ===
Montour has a humid continental climate (Dfa/Dfb) and average monthly temperatures in Danville range from 26.9 °F in January to 72.3 °F in July.

=== Adjacent counties ===
- Lycoming County (north)
- Columbia County (east)
- Northumberland County (south & west)

=== Major highways ===
- I-80
- US 11
- PA 44
- PA 45
- PA 54
- PA 254
- PA 642

== Geology ==
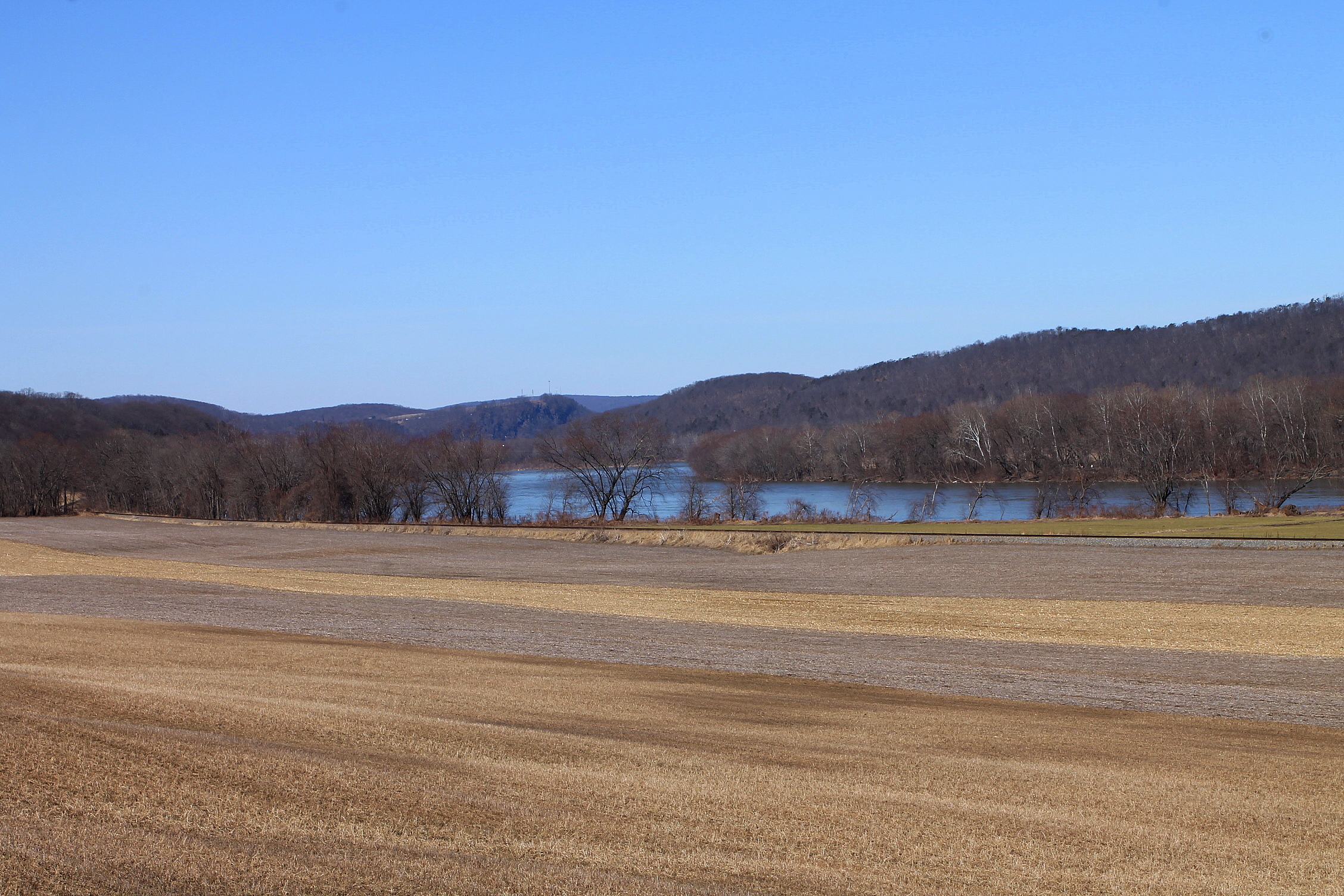
Scenery of southern Montour County

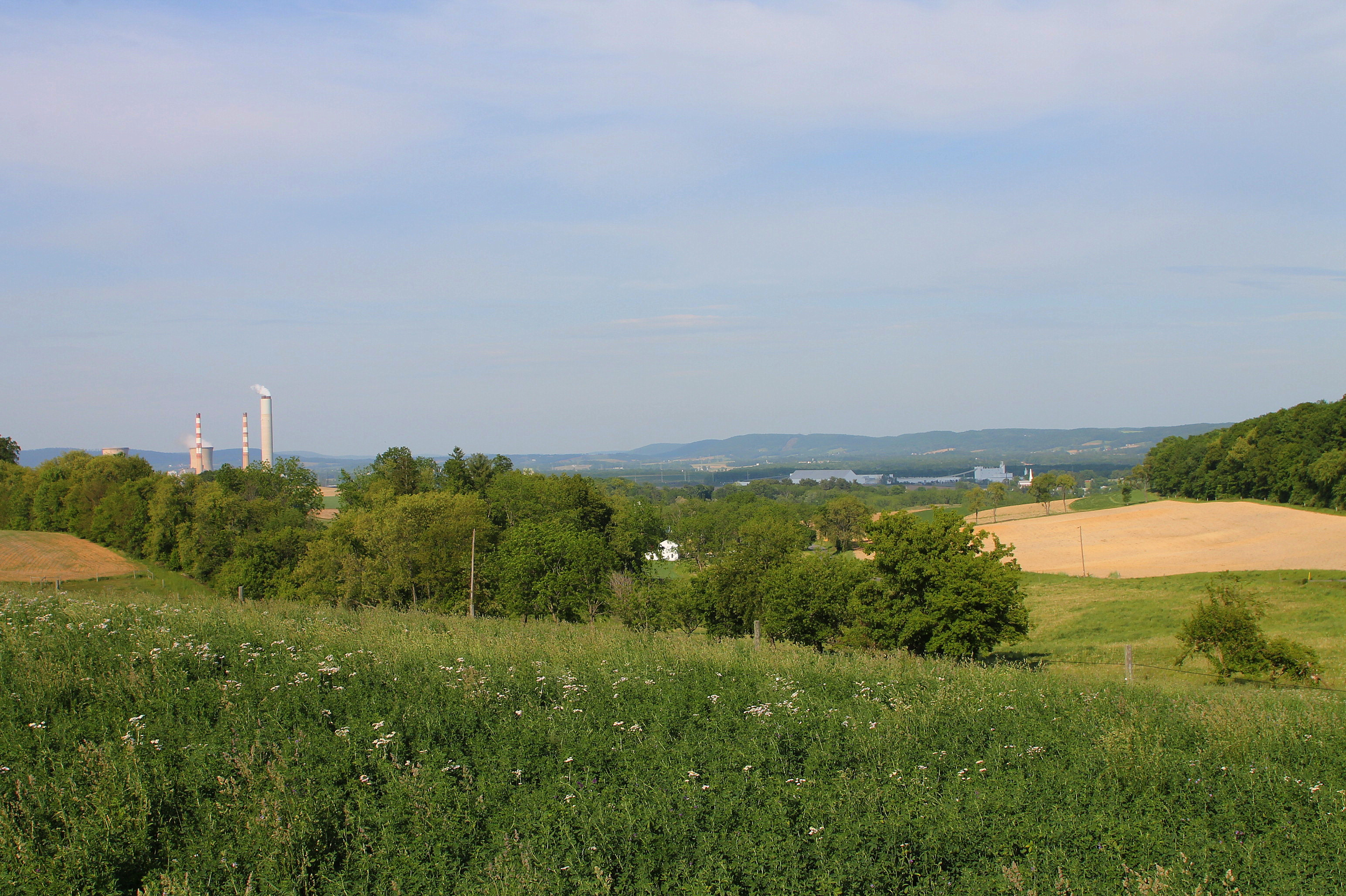
Scenery of northern Montour County

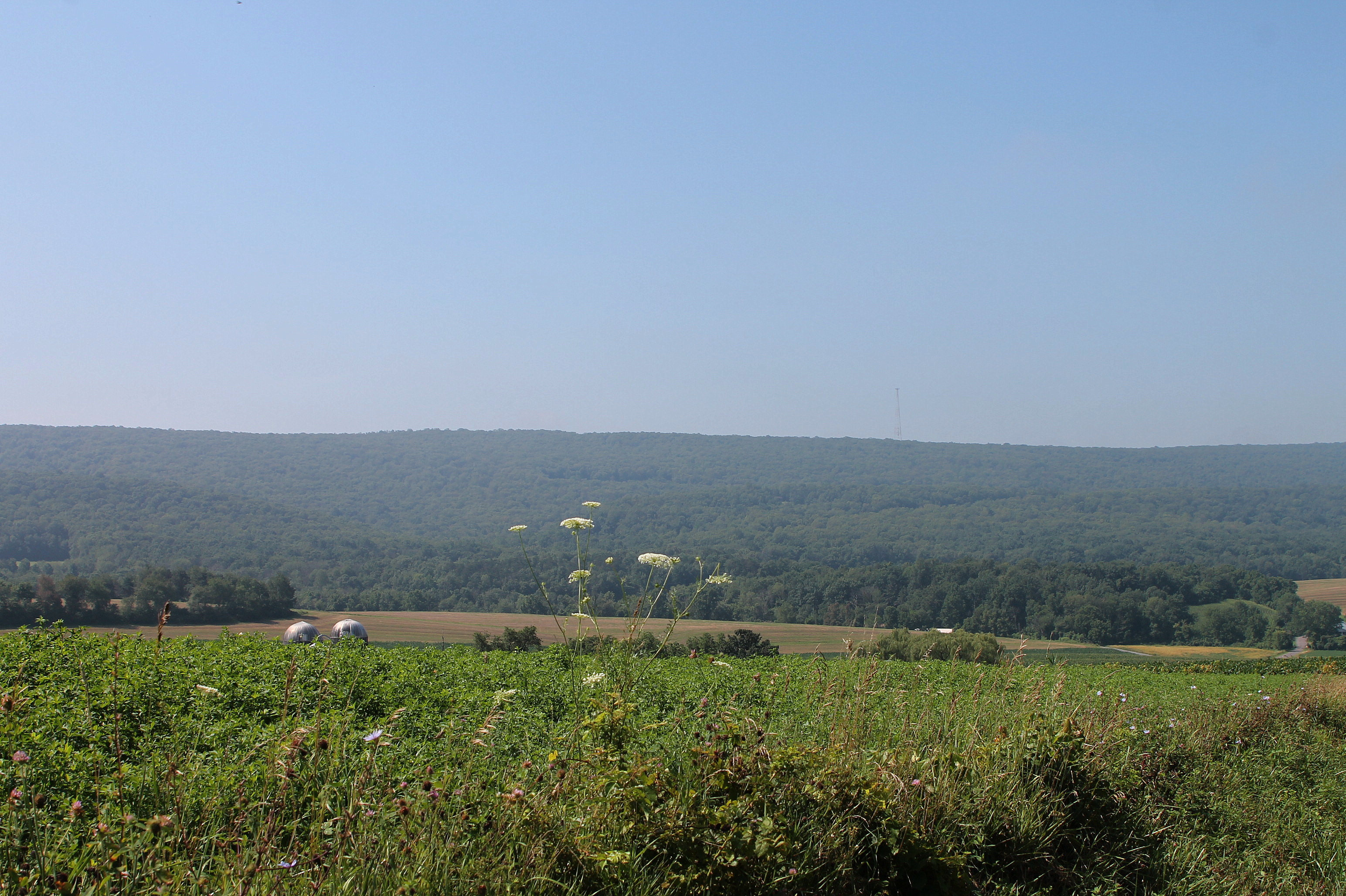
Montour Ridge in Liberty Township

Montour County is located in the Ridge-and-Valley Province of the Appalachian Mountains. A total of 65% of the soils in the county are well-drained. The Muncy Hills are located in the northern part of the county and Montour Ridge is located in the southern part of the county, not far from the Susquehanna River. Montour Ridge also is home to the highest elevation in the county, 1425 feet above sea level. The lowest elevation is 440 feet above sea level, at the Susquehanna River.

The sedimentary rocks in Montour County are from either the Devonian Period or the Silurian Period. The Devonian Period rocks are more common than Silurian Period rocks, making up two thirds of the county. These rocks are prevalent in the Muncy Hills and the lowlands in the southern portion of the county. The Devonian Period rocks in Montour County include the Catskill Formation, the Marcellus Shale, the Helderburg Formation, the Mahantango Formation, the Oriskany Formation, the Marine Beds, and the Onondaga Formation. The other one third of the rocks in Montour County are from the Silurian Period. Rocks from this period are prevalent on Montour Ridge and the adjacent valley and the hills to the northwest of Washingtonville. These areas consist of the Wills Creek formation, the Tonoloway Formation, the Bloomsburg Formation, the Tuscarora Formation, the Clinton Group, and the McKenzie Formation.

There are three major anticlines and synclines in Montour County. These are the White Deer Anticline, the Lackawanna Syncline, and the Milton Anticline. These are located in the northern, central, and Montour Ridge areas of the county, respectively. These features are situated in a northeast–southwest alignment. They were formed by regional compression and uplift approximately 200 million years ago, during the Permian Period. During the Pleistocene Period, the Illinoian glacial advance reached Montour County, although the Wisconsin glacial advance stopped slightly short of it. There are alluvial deposits in many of the river valleys in the county, especially there two streams or rivers meet. These deposits were formed fairly recently, geologically speaking.

The water supply for Montour County comes primarily from the Susquehanna River, as well as wells and springs. The rural areas especially depend on wells for their water supply, but Danville mostly uses the Susquehanna River. Wells drilled into Silurian rock have a tendency to be highly hard and prone to developing sinkholes. However, the Keyser, Wills Creek, and Tonoloway Formations are considerably better at producing water.

== Demographics ==
Historical population
Census	Pop.	Note	%±
1850	13,239		—
1860	13,053		−1.4%
1870	15,344		17.6%
1880	15,468		0.8%
1890	15,645		1.1%
1900	15,526		−0.8%
1910	14,868		−4.2%
1920	14,080		−5.3%
1930	14,517		3.1%
1940	15,466		6.5%
1950	16,001		3.5%
1960	16,730		4.6%
1970	16,508		−1.3%
1980	16,675		1.0%
1990	17,735		6.4%
2000	18,236		2.8%
2010	18,267		0.2%
2020	18,136		−0.7%
2025 (est.)	17,868	▼	−1.5%
U.S. Decennial Census; 1790-1960 1900-90; 1990-2000 2010 2010-20 2025

=== Racial and ethnic composition ===
Montour County, Pennsylvania – Racial and ethnic composition Note: the US Census treats Hispanic/Latino as an ethnic category. This table excludes Latinos from the racial categories and assigns them to a separate category. Hispanics/Latinos may be of any race.
Race / Ethnicity (NH = Non-Hispanic)	Pop 1980	Pop 1990	Pop 2000	Pop 2010	Pop 2020	% 1980	% 1990	% 2000	% 2010	% 2020
White alone (NH)	16,492	17,397	17,552	17,206	16,105	98.90%	98.09%	96.25%	94.19%	88.80%
Black or African American alone (NH)	21	76	182	237	320	0.13%	0.43%	1.00%	1.30%	1.76%
Native American or Alaska Native alone (NH)	14	5	8	12	27	0.08%	0.03%	0.04%	0.07%	0.15%
Asian alone (NH)	83	136	232	323	668	0.50%	0.77%	1.27%	1.77%	3.68%
Native Hawaiian or Pacific Islander alone (NH)	x	x	0	2	0	x	x	0.00%	0.01%	0.00%
Other race alone (NH)	16	5	10	10	22	0.10%	0.03%	0.05%	0.05%	0.12%
Mixed race or Multiracial (NH)	x	x	85	153	507	x	x	0.47%	0.84%	2.80%
Hispanic or Latino (any race)	49	116	167	324	487	0.29%	0.65%	0.92%	1.77%	2.69%
Total	16,675	17,735	18,236	18,267	18,136	100.00%	100.00%	100.00%	100.00%	100.00%

=== 2020 census ===
As of the 2020 census, the county had a population of 18,136. The median age was 43.6 years. 20.6% of residents were under the age of 18 and 22.4% of residents were 65 years of age or older. For every 100 females there were 94.7 males, and for every 100 females age 18 and over there were 91.6 males age 18 and over.

The racial makeup of the county was 89.6% White, 1.8% Black or African American, 0.2% American Indian and Alaska Native, 3.7% Asian, <0.1% Native Hawaiian and Pacific Islander, 0.8% from some other race, and 3.9% from two or more races. Hispanic or Latino residents of any race comprised 2.7% of the population.

45.7% of residents lived in urban areas, while 54.3% lived in rural areas.

There were 7,513 households in the county, of which 26.3% had children under the age of 18 living in them. Of all households, 50.0% were married-couple households, 18.1% were households with a male householder and no spouse or partner present, and 25.4% were households with a female householder and no spouse or partner present. About 31.8% of all households were made up of individuals and 14.2% had someone living alone who was 65 years of age or older.

There were 8,083 housing units, of which 7.1% were vacant. Among occupied housing units, 72.0% were owner-occupied and 28.0% were renter-occupied. The homeowner vacancy rate was 1.2% and the rental vacancy rate was 9.4%.

=== 2000 census ===
As of the census of 2000, there were 18,236 people, 7,085 households, and 4,817 families residing in the county. The population density was 140 inhabitants per square mile (54/km^{2}). There were 7,627 housing units at an average density of 58 units per square mile (22/km^{2}). The racial makeup of the county was 96.67% White, 1.01% Black or African American, 0.07% Native American, 1.28% Asian, 0.38% from other races, and 0.59% from two or more races. 0.92% of the population were Hispanic or Latino of any race. 33.2% were of German, 13.2% American, 8.1% Irish, 6.6% English, 5.7% Italian and 5.6% Polish ancestry.

There were 7,085 households, out of which 30.00% had children under the age of 18 living with them, 56.30% were married couples living together, 8.90% had a female householder with no husband present, and 32.00% were non-families. 28.00% of all households were made up of individuals, and 12.00% had someone living alone who was 65 years of age or older. The average household size was 2.43 and the average family size was 2.98.

In Montour County, the population was spread out, with 24.40% under the age of 18, 6.40% from 18 to 24, 28.20% from 25 to 44, 24.00% from 45 to 64, and 17.10% who were 65 years of age or older. The median age was 40 years. For every 100 females, there were 90.50 males. For every 100 females age 18 and over, there were 86.00 males.

== Metropolitan Statistical Area ==
The United States Office of Management and Budget has designated Montour County as the Bloomsburg-Berwick, PA Metropolitan Statistical Area (MSA). As of the 2010 U.S. census the metropolitan area ranked 20th most populous in the State of Pennsylvania and the 368th most populous in the United States with a population of 82,562. Montour County is also a part of the larger Bloomsburg-Berwick-Sunbury, PA Combined Statistical Area (CSA), which combines the populations of Montour County as well as Columbia, Northumberland, Snyder and Union Counties in Pennsylvania. The Combined Statistical Area ranked 8th in the State of Pennsylvania and 115th most populous in the United States with a population of 264,739.

== Economy ==
There are approximately 350 farms in Montour County. The majority of these farms produce beef, hogs, and dairy. Limestone is mined in some areas in the county.

== Government ==
United States presidential election results for Montour County, Pennsylvania
Year	Republican		Democratic		Third party(ies)	
Year	No.	%	No.	%	No.	%
1888	1,289	39.91%	1,865	57.74%	76	2.35%
1892	1,108	35.97%	1,877	60.94%	95	3.08%
1896	1,384	42.65%	1,747	53.84%	114	3.51%
1900	1,292	39.89%	1,875	57.89%	72	2.22%
1904	1,518	51.37%	1,358	45.96%	79	2.67%
1908	1,164	42.34%	1,490	54.20%	95	3.46%
1912	308	10.98%	1,492	53.19%	1,005	35.83%
1916	1,068	40.11%	1,530	57.45%	65	2.44%
1920	2,296	53.76%	1,872	43.83%	103	2.41%
1924	2,499	55.83%	1,799	40.19%	178	3.98%
1928	3,692	71.69%	1,445	28.06%	13	0.25%
1932	2,159	44.24%	2,677	54.86%	44	0.90%
1936	2,350	39.74%	3,534	59.76%	30	0.51%
1940	2,723	46.89%	3,080	53.04%	4	0.07%
1944	2,727	55.12%	2,212	44.71%	8	0.16%
1948	2,690	57.60%	1,964	42.06%	16	0.34%
1952	3,725	62.12%	2,264	37.76%	7	0.12%
1956	3,976	65.71%	2,072	34.24%	3	0.05%
1960	4,154	61.17%	2,629	38.71%	8	0.12%
1964	2,527	40.67%	3,683	59.27%	4	0.06%
1968	3,289	55.04%	2,239	37.47%	448	7.50%
1972	4,386	69.64%	1,755	27.87%	157	2.49%
1976	3,259	53.65%	2,727	44.89%	89	1.47%
1980	3,399	55.76%	2,272	37.27%	425	6.97%
1984	4,174	66.81%	2,055	32.89%	19	0.30%
1988	3,617	63.50%	2,031	35.66%	48	0.84%
1992	3,096	46.58%	2,150	32.35%	1,400	21.07%
1996	2,785	47.93%	2,183	37.57%	843	14.51%
2000	3,960	60.97%	2,356	36.27%	179	2.76%
2004	4,903	64.31%	2,666	34.97%	55	0.72%
2008	4,574	56.64%	3,364	41.65%	138	1.71%
2012	4,652	59.19%	3,053	38.85%	154	1.96%
2016	5,288	61.80%	2,857	33.39%	411	4.80%
2020	5,844	59.53%	3,771	38.41%	202	2.06%
2024	5,944	59.76%	3,862	38.83%	141	1.42%

United States Senate election results for Montour County, Pennsylvania1
Year	Republican		Democratic		Third party(ies)	
Year	No.	%	No.	%	No.	%
1994	2,797	55.27%	2,044	40.39%	220	4.35%
2000	4,309	67.27%	1,927	30.08%	170	2.65%
2006	3,110	53.49%	2,704	46.51%	0	0.00%
2012	4,435	57.26%	3,121	40.29%	190	2.45%
2018	3,943	56.06%	2,966	42.17%	125	1.78%
2024	5,847	59.06%	3,813	38.52%	240	2.42%

United States Senate election results for Montour County, Pennsylvania3
Year	Republican		Democratic		Third party(ies)	
Year	No.	%	No.	%	No.	%
1992	3,320	50.26%	2,888	43.72%	398	6.02%
1998	2,808	66.84%	1,223	29.11%	170	4.05%
2004	4,873	67.08%	2,094	28.83%	297	4.09%
2010	3,627	63.69%	2,068	36.31%	0	0.00%
2016	5,066	59.25%	2,898	33.89%	586	6.85%
2022	4,328	55.25%	3,213	41.02%	292	3.73%

Pennsylvania Gubernatorial election results for Montour County
Year	Republican		Democratic		Third party(ies)	
Year	No.	%	No.	%	No.	%
1970	2,902	50.71%	2,614	45.68%	207	3.62%
1974	2,655	52.54%	2,345	46.41%	53	1.05%
1978	2,870	61.38%	1,782	38.11%	24	0.51%
1982	2,537	50.29%	2,496	49.47%	12	0.24%
1986	2,171	46.99%	2,429	52.58%	20	0.43%
1990	1,201	31.06%	2,666	68.94%	0	0.00%
1994	2,809	55.68%	1,640	32.51%	596	11.81%
1998	2,700	64.18%	1,012	24.06%	495	11.77%
2002	2,873	59.10%	1,847	38.00%	141	2.90%
2006	3,059	52.53%	2,764	47.47%	0	0.00%
2010	3,896	68.22%	1,815	31.78%	0	0.00%
2014	2,900	57.73%	2,123	42.27%	0	0.00%
2018	3,642	51.92%	3,228	46.02%	145	2.07%
2022	4,037	51.38%	3,640	46.33%	180	2.29%

Montour County has traditionally been heavily Republican, with it voting for every Republican presidential candidate since 1944, with the exception of Barry Goldwater. Donald Trump won it by just over 21% in 2020, down from his 28-point margin in 2016 and slightly better than Mitt Romney's margin in 2012.

The county is run by three locally elected commissioners, each of whose term of office lasts for four years.

=== State senate ===
- Lynda Schlegel Culver, Republican, Pennsylvania's 27th Senatorial District

=== State House of Representatives ===
- Mike Stender, Republican, Pennsylvania's 108th Representative District

=== United States House of Representatives ===
- Dan Meuser, Republican, Pennsylvania's 9th congressional district

=== United States Senate ===
- John Fetterman, Democratic
- Dave McCormick, Republican

== Education ==
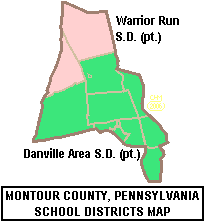
Map of Montour County, Pennsylvania Public School Districts

Central Susquehanna Intermediate Unit #16 provides a wide variety of services to children living in Montour County. These include early intervention, special education support services, driver education on road training, speech and hearing therapy and autistic support. Services for children during the preschool years are provided without cost to their families when the child is determined to meet eligibility requirements.

Danville Area Head Start

=== Public school districts ===
- Danville Area School District (also in Northumberland County)
- Warrior Run School District (also in Northumberland and Union Counties)

=== Private schools ===
As reported by the Pennsylvania Department of Education - EdNA. February 2014

- Alternative Education Program - Danville
- Breezy Meadow - Danville
- Chillisquaque Valley Parochial School - Bloomsburg
- County Line Parochial School - Danville
- Creek Side School - Turbotville
- Danville Child Development Center - Danville
- Danville Mennonite School - Danville
- Delong Alternative Educ Program - Washingtonville
- Limestone Mennonite Parochial School - Milton
- Ridgeview Amish School - Watsontown
- St Cyril Kindergarten - Danville
- St Joseph School - Danville
- The Learning Tree Child Care Center, LLC - Danville

CSIU16 School Directory 2014

=== Library ===
- Thomas Beaver Free Library - Danville

== Communities ==
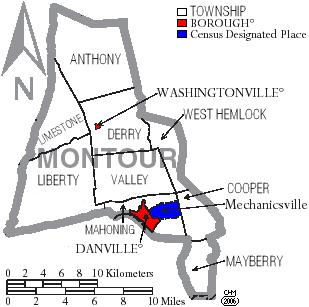
Map of Montour County, Pennsylvania with Municipal Labels showing Boroughs (red), Townships (white), and Census-designated places (blue).

Under Pennsylvania law, there are four types of incorporated municipalities: cities, boroughs, townships, and, in one case, towns. The following boroughs and townships are located in Montour County:

=== Boroughs ===
- Danville (county seat)
- Washingtonville

=== Townships ===
- Anthony Township
- Cooper Township
- Derry Township
- Liberty Township
- Limestone Township
- Mahoning Township
- Mayberry Township
- Valley Township
- West Hemlock Township

=== Unincorporated communities ===
- Exchange
- Kaseville
- Limestoneville
- Mausdale
- Mechanicsville
- Mexico
- Mooresburg
- Ottawa
- Ridgeville

=== Population ranking ===
The population ranking of the following table is based on the 2010 census of Montour County.

† county seat

Rank	City/Town/etc.	Municipal type	Population (2010 Census)
1	† Danville	Borough	4,699
2	Washingtonville	Borough	273

== See also ==
- National Register of Historic Places listings in Montour County, Pennsylvania
