= Mahoning Township, Montour County, Pennsylvania =

Township in Pennsylvania, United States

Coordinates: 40°58′00″N 76°35′59″W

Mahoning Township, Mountour County, Pennsylvania
- Township
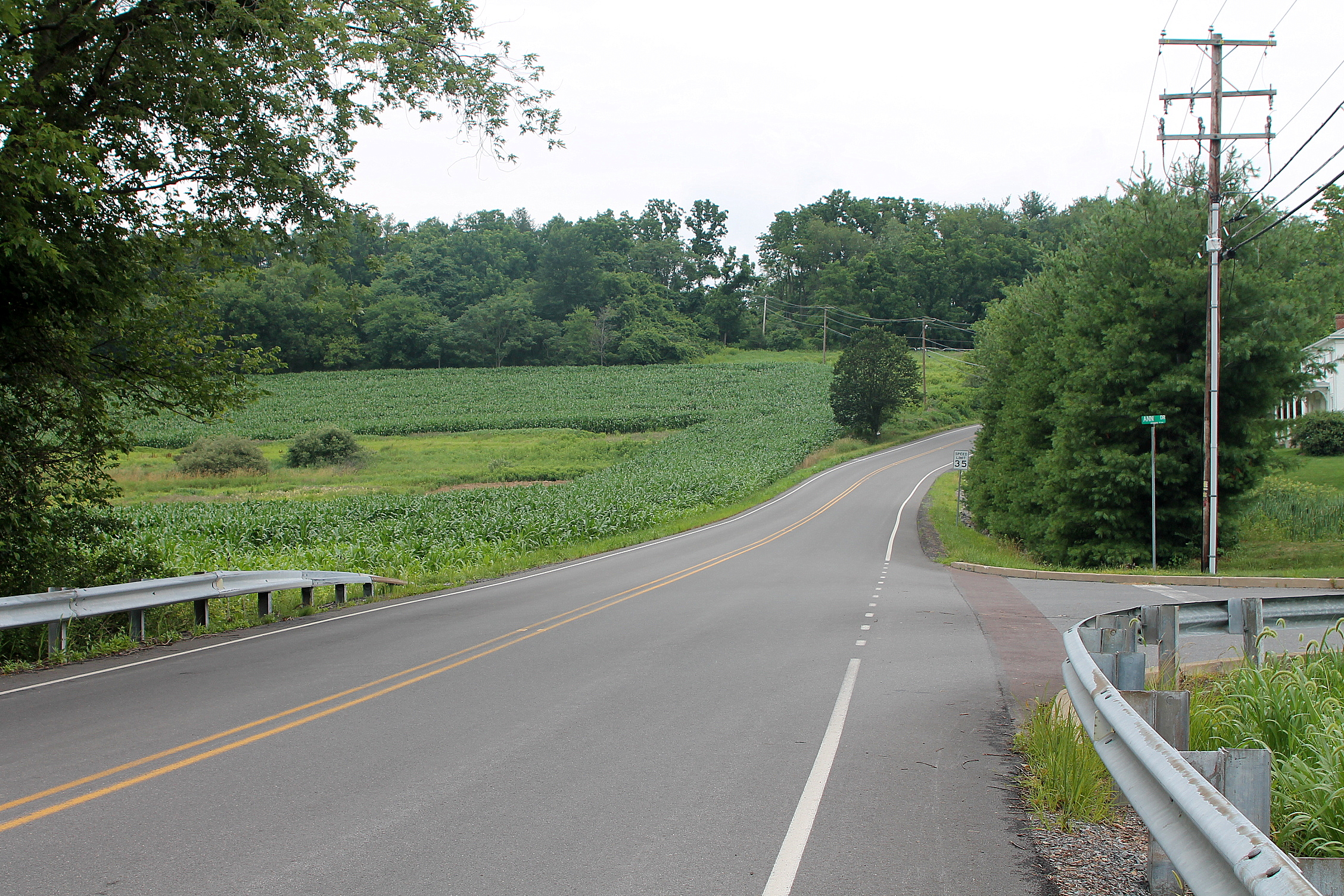
- Schoolhouse Road and summer scenery in Mahoning Township

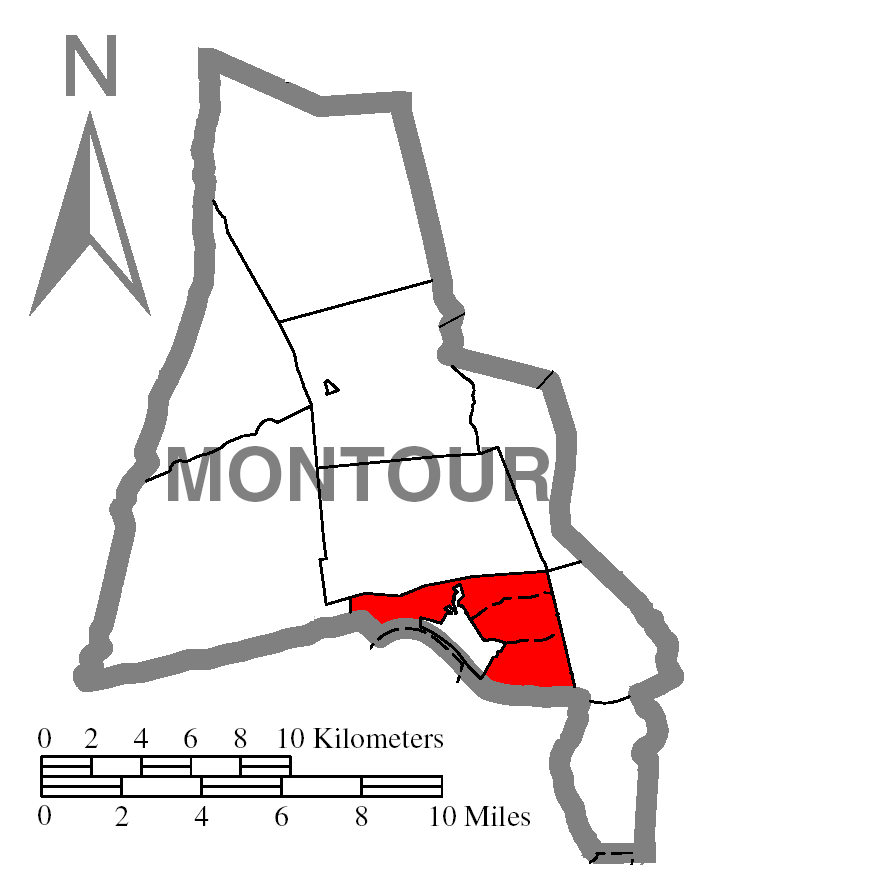
- Map of Montour County, Pennsylvania Highlighting Mahoning Township

- Map of Montour County, Pennsylvania
- Country: United States
- State: Pennsylvania
- County: Montour
- Settled: 1775
- Incorporated: 1786

Area
  - Total: 8.88 sq mi (22.99 km^{2})
  - Land: 8.20 sq mi (21.24 km^{2})
  - Water: 0.67 sq mi (1.74 km^{2})

Population (2020)
  - Total: 4,628 ▲
  - Estimate (2021): 4,604
  - Density: 512.5/sq mi (197.89/km^{2})
- FIPS code: 42-093-46656

Mahoning Township is a township in Montour County, Pennsylvania, United States.

== Geography ==
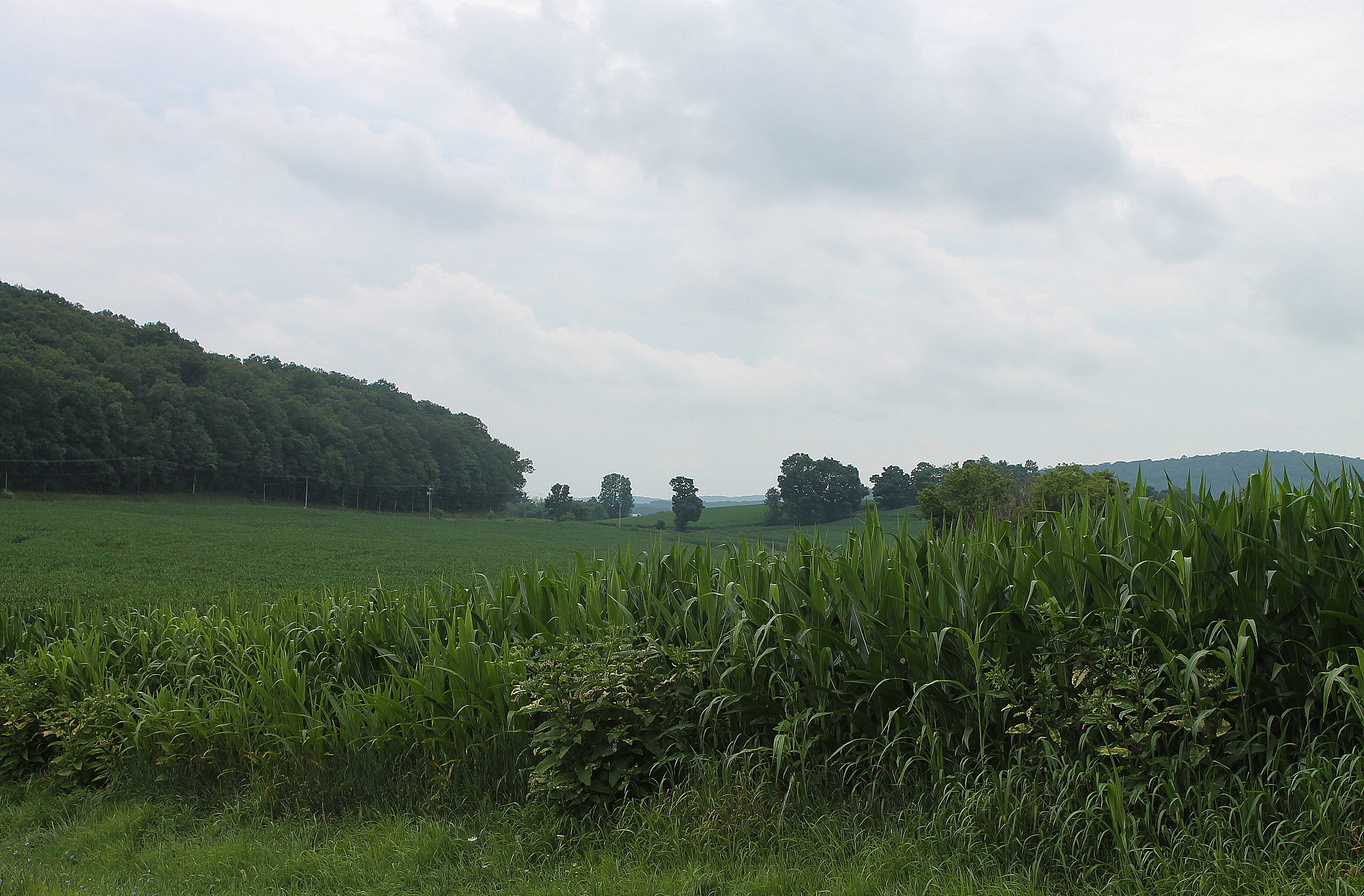
Corn or sorghum field in Mahoning Township, Montour County, Pennsylvania

According to the United States Census Bureau, the township has a total area of 8.9 square miles (22.9 km^{2}), of which 8.2 square miles (21.3 km^{2}) is land and 0.6 square miles (1.6 km^{2}) (7.00%) is water.

== Demographics ==
Historical population
Census	Pop.	Note	%±
2000	4,263		—
2010	4,171		−2.2%
2020	4,628		11.0%
2021 (est.)	4,604		−0.5%
U.S. Decennial Census

As of the census of 2000, there were 4,263 people, 1,466 households, and 963 families residing in the township.

The population density was 517.3 inhabitants per square mile (199.7/km^{2}). There were 1,542 housing units at an average density of 187.1 per square mile (72.2/km^{2}).

The racial makeup of the township was 93.97% White, 1.92% African American, 0.02% Native American, 2.72% Asian, 0.61% from other races, and 0.75% from two or more races. Hispanic or Latino of any race were 1.71% of the population.

There were 1,466 households, out of which 29.4% had children under the age of eighteen living with them; 54.6% were married couples living together, 8.6% had a female householder with no husband present, and 34.3% were non-families. 32.1% of all households were made up of individuals, and 15.8% had someone living alone who was sixty-five years of age or older.

The average household size was 2.32 and the average family size was 2.92.

In the township the population was spread out, with 22.3% under the age of eighteen, 5.2% from eighteen to twenty-four, 22.3% from twenty-five to forty-four, 24.1% from forty-five to sixty-four, and 26.0% who were sixty-five years of age or older. The median age was forty-five years.

For every one hundred females, there were 78.2 males. For every one hundred females aged eighteen and over, there were 72.0 males.

The median income for a household in the township was $43,995, and the median income for a family was $55,536. Males had a median income of $46,016 compared with that of $31,078 for females.

The per capita income for the township was $24,099.

Roughly 2.4% of families and 8.3% of the population were living below the poverty line, including 5.7% of those under the age of eighteen and 18.5% of those who were aged sixty-five or over.
