= Kutz =

Kutz (Kuts, Kuz, Coots) is a German surname with several origins. Some time ago it was considered that this word is derived from the Middle High German word "kötze" or “kütze”, which means a woven basket (Tragekorb) or a kind of a coarse woolen garment (Oberkleid). Subsequently, the name was believed to derive from the Old Polish–Lithuanian word "kucina", which means a cudgel-like weapon. However, currently an opinion prevails that etymologically the name Kutz is derived from the Proto-Germanic word "kūtiō". According to the Starling linguist's database, this word originally referred to birds of prey, not specified by kind. During the 14th and 18th centuries the word passed through a number of grammatical transformations from "kūtze" to "kutz", and finally into "kauz". At present, this word translates from German as "owl".

The last name Kutz was previously common in Prussia. In the 17th to 20th centuries, East Prussia was periodically captured by Poland, Germany or the Russian Empire. This may account for some Kutz in central and eastern Europe. Kutz is also a Germanized respelling of Polish Kuc, a nickname for a short person from a noun meaning "pony".

== People ==
- George Kutz (18th century), founder of the city named in his honor, Kutztown in the U.S. state of Pennsylvania
- Charles Willauer Kutz (1870–1951), General US Army, American politician, President of the District of Columbia Board
- J. Fred Coots (1897–1985), American composer
- José Nathan Kutz (1969), American scientist in the field of Mathematical Neuroscience, Professor within the Department of Applied Mathematics at the University of Washington.
- Kazimierz Julian Kutz (1929–2018), Polish film director, author, journalist and politician, one of the representatives of the Polish Film School and a deputy speaker of the Senate of Poland
- K'utz Chman, king who laid foundations for Mayan civilisation in 700 B.C. "Kutz Chman" translates from the Mayan language as "old condor" or "old vulture".
- Vladimir Kuts (1927–1975), Soviet long-distance runner and athletics coach, Olympic gold medallist at the 1956 Olympics

== See also ==
- Kutz Mill, historic grist mill in Pennsylvania
- Kutz's Mill Bridge, historic wooden covered bridge in Pennsylvania
- Kutz Memorial Bridge in Washington, D.C
- Kutz-Bauer v Freie und Hansestadt Hamburg, an EU labour law case
- Friedrich Traugott Kützing, phycologist who used the standard author abbreviation "Kütz"
- Kutztown, Town in Pennsylvania, home to Kutztown University
- Kuts
