= Koets =

Koets means coach (a four-wheeled carriage) in Dutch. It is a Dutch surname that may refer to

- Adam Koets (born 1984), American football offensive tackle
- Arent Jacobsz Koets (c.1600–1635), Dutch concierge
- Arne Koets, Dutch historical European martial arts practitioner
- Roelof Koets (1592–1654), Dutch painter
- Roelof Koets (Zwolle) (1655–1725), Dutch painter

== See also ==
- Kuts
- Kutz
- Couts
