= Dreibelbis Station Bridge =

- U.S. National Register of Historic Places
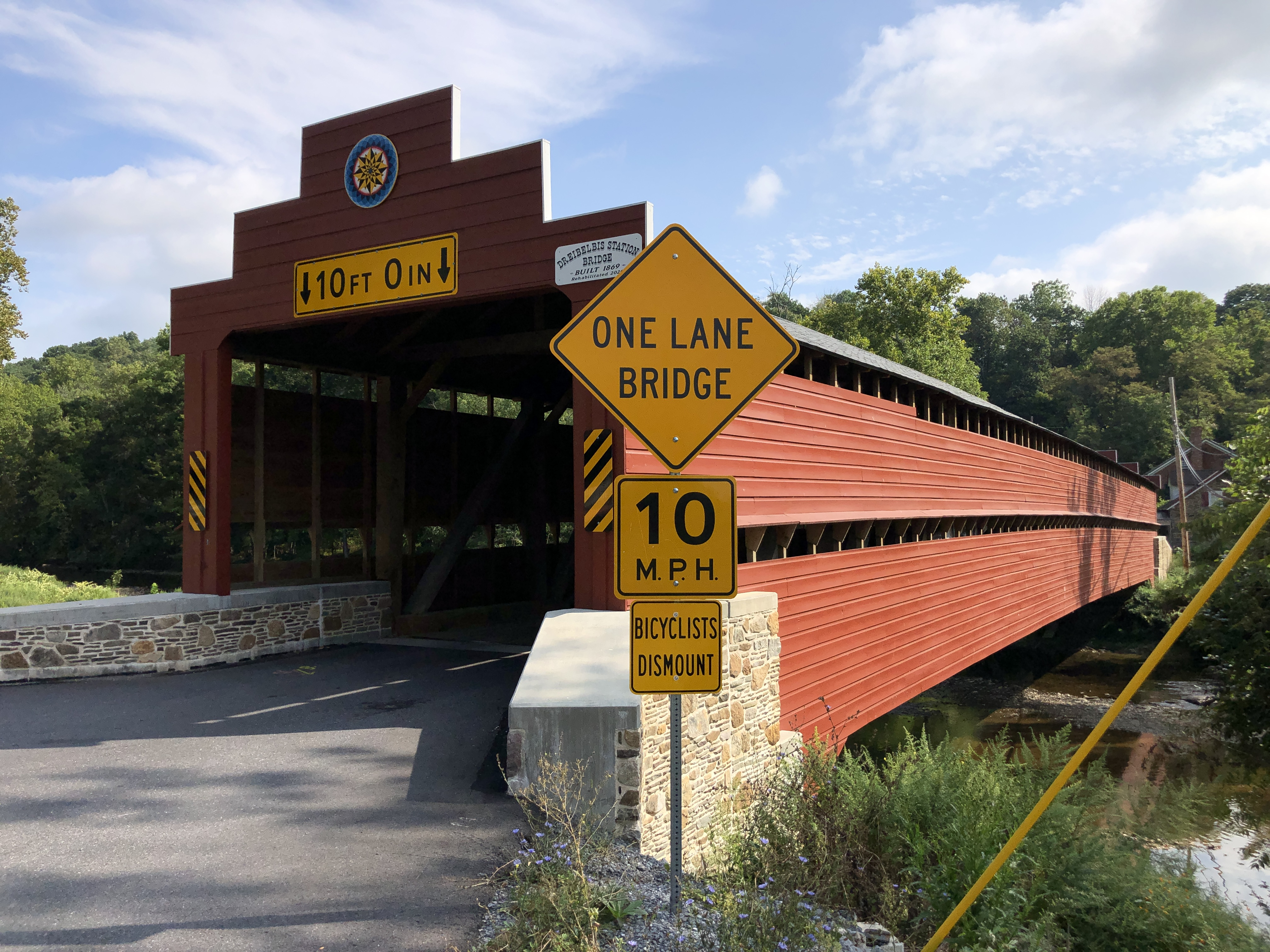
- Dreibelbis Station Bridge in August 2022

- Location within Pennsylvania Location within the United States
- Nearest city: Lenhartsville, Pennsylvania
- Coordinates: 40°33′17″N 75°52′48″W
- Area: 0.1 acres (0.040 ha)
- Built: 1869
- Architectural style: Burr Arch Truss
- MPS: Berks County Covered Bridges TR
- NRHP reference No.: 81000530
- Added to NRHP: February 23, 1981

The Dreibelbis Station Bridge /draɪbəlbɪs/ is a 172-foot-long (52 m) Burr arch truss covered bridge spanning Maiden Creek between Windsor Township and Greenwich Township, south of Lenhartsville in Berks County, Pennsylvania. The bridge was built in 1869 and was added to the National Register of Historic Places on February 23, 1981.

== See also ==
- List of bridges documented by the Historic American Engineering Record in Pennsylvania
- National Register of Historic Places listings in Berks County, Pennsylvania
