= Ontelaunee (disambiguation) =

Ontelaunee may refer to the following in Berks County, Pennsylvania:

- Ontelaunee Township, Pennsylvania
- Ontelaunee Creek
- Lake Ontelaunee
