= Sacony Creek =

River in Pennsylvania, United States

Sacony Creek Saucony Creek
- Location within Pennsylvania
- Etymology: "Place of outlet"

Location
- Country: United States
- State: Pennsylvania
- County: Berks County

Physical characteristics
- Source
  - coordinates: 40°31′31″N 75°52′29″W
- Mouth: Maiden Creek
- Length: 17.4 miles (28.0 km)

Sacony Creek (historically Saucony Creek) is a 17.4-mile-long (28.0 km) tributary of Maiden Creek in Berks County, Pennsylvania in the United States. It flows through the borough of Kutztown, and is the main water source there. The Pennsylvania Fish and Boat Commission stock trout into the creek annually.

Sacony is a name derived from a Lenni Lenape Native American language purported to mean "place of outlet" or "where two rivers run together".

The Kutz Mill and Kutz's Mill Bridge are located on Sacony Creek in Greenwich Township.

Sacony Creek joins Maiden Creek at the community of Virginville.

The shoe manufacturer Saucony is named after Sacony Creek, as the company was founded on the banks of the Sacony in 1898, in Kutztown.

== See also ==
- List of rivers of Pennsylvania
