= Dreibelbis =

Dreibelbis may refer to:

- Dreibelbis, Pennsylvania, an unincorporated community in Berks County, Pennsylvania, United States
- Galen Dreibelbis (born 1935), American politician

== See also ==
- Dreibelbis Mill, a historic grist mill in Berks County, Pennsylvania, United States
