= Weisenberg Township, Pennsylvania =

Township in Pennsylvania, US

Weisenberg Township
- Township
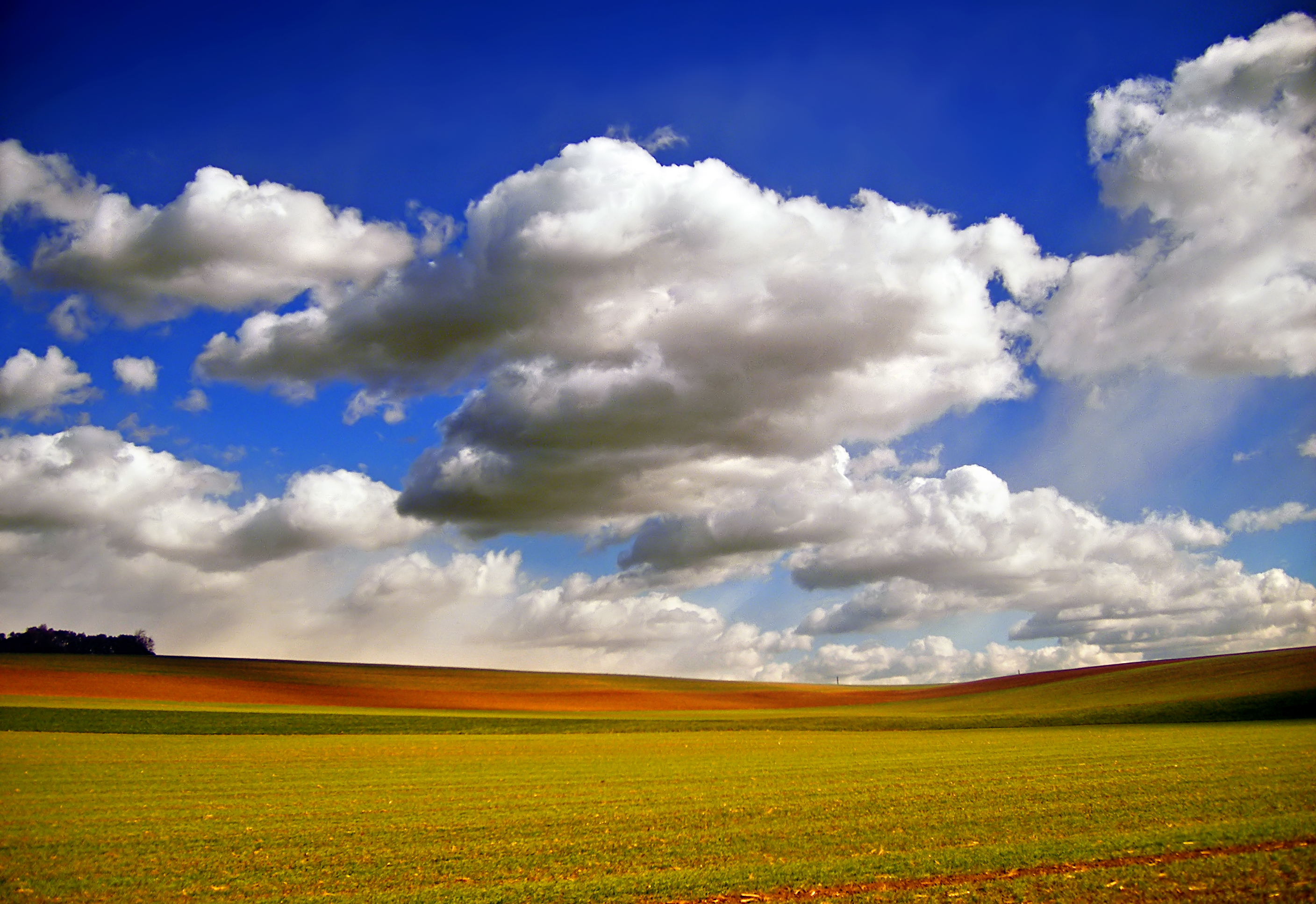
- Weisenberg Township in 2006

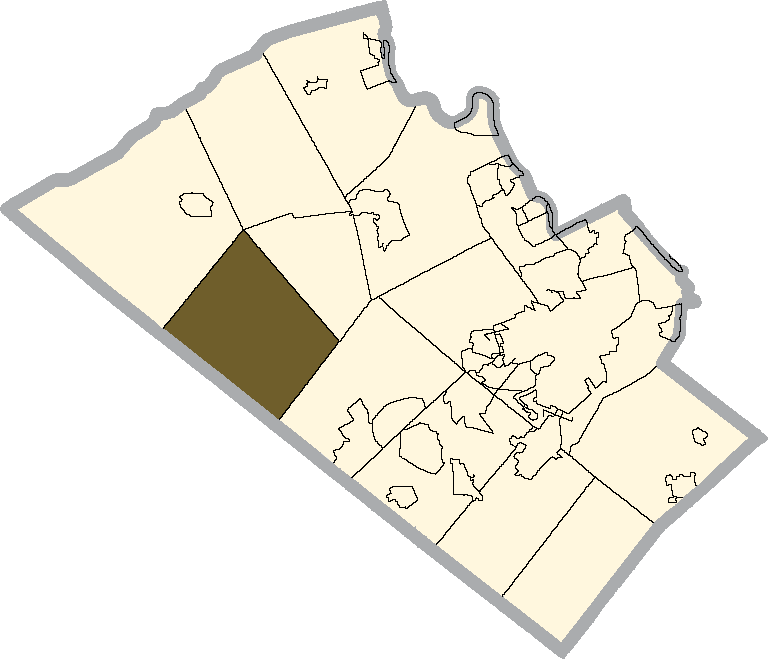
- Location of Weisenberg Township in Lehigh County, Pennsylvania and of Lehigh County in Pennsylvania

- Location of Weisenberg Township in Pennsylvania Location in the United States
- Coordinates: 40°37′33″N 75°45′05″W
- Country: United States
- State: Pennsylvania
- County: Lehigh

Area
  - Township: 26.82 sq mi (69.47 km^{2})
  - Land: 26.77 sq mi (69.34 km^{2})
  - Water: 0.050 sq mi (0.13 km^{2})
- Elevation: 656 ft (200 m)

Population (2010)
  - Township: 4,923
  - Estimate (2016): 5,143
  - Density: 192.1/sq mi (74.17/km^{2})
  - Metro: 865,310 (US: 68th)
- Time zone: UTC-5 (EST)
  - Summer (DST): UTC-4 (EDT)
- ZIP Code: 18031, 18051, 18066, 19530
- Area codes: 610
- FIPS code: 42-077-82064
- Primary airport: Lehigh Valley International Airport
- Major hospital: Lehigh Valley Hospital–Cedar Crest
- School district: Northwestern Lehigh or Easton Area
- Website: www.weisenbergtownship.org

Weisenberg Township is a township in Lehigh County, Pennsylvania, United States. The population of Weisenberg Township was 4,923 at the 2010 U.S. census. The township is a suburb of Allentown in the Lehigh Valley, which had a population of 861,899 and was the 68th-most populous metropolitan area in the U.S. as of the 2020 census.

== Geography ==
According to the U.S. Census Bureau, the township has a total area of 26.82 square miles (69.47 km^{2}) of which 26.78 square miles (69.35 km^{2}) are land and 0.05 square miles (0.13 km^{2}), or 0.18%, are water. It is in the Delaware River watershed and is drained by tributaries of Jordan Creek into the Lehigh River to the east and by tributaries of Maiden Creek into the Schuylkill River to the southwest.

Weisenberg Township includes the villages of Haafsville, Hymensville, New Smithville, Seiberlingville, Seipstown, Stines Corner, and Werleys Corner.

=== Adjacent municipalities ===
- Lynn Township (northwest)
- Heidelberg Township (tangent to the north)
- Lowhill Township (northeast)
- Upper Macungie Township (southeast)
- Maxatawny Township (south)
- Greenwich Township (southwest)
- Albany Township (west)

=== Climate ===
The township has a humid continental climate (Dfa/Dfb) and the hardiness zones are 6a and 6b. Average monthly temperatures in Seiberlingville range from 27.9 °F (−2.3 °C) in January to 71.6 °F (22.0 °C) in July.

== Demographics ==
Historical population
Census	Pop.	Note	%±
2000	4,144		—
2010	4,923		18.8%
2016 (est.)	5,143		4.5%
U.S. Decennial Census

As of the census of 2000, there were 4,144 people, 1,458 households, and 1,214 families residing in the township. The population density was 154.5 inhabitants per square mile (59.7/km^{2}). There were 1,514 housing units at an average density of 56.5 units per square mile (21.8 units/km^{2}). The racial makeup of the township was 98.07% White, 0.53% African American, 0.02% Native American, 0.43% Asian, 0.29% from other races, and 0.65% from two or more races. Hispanic or Latino of any race were 1.25% of the population.

There were 1,458 households, out of which 37.7% had children under the age of 18 living with them, 75.9% were married couples living together, 4.7% had a female householder with no husband present, and 16.7% were non-families. 11.8% of all households were made up of individuals, and 3.8% had someone living alone who was 65 years of age or older. The average household size was 2.82 and the average family size was 3.09.

In the township, the population was spread out, with 25.9% under the age of 18, 5.7% from 18 to 24, 31.4% from 25 to 44, 27.6% from 45 to 64, and 9.3% who were 65 years of age or older. The median age was 39 years. For every 100 females, there were 102.1 males. For every 100 females age 18 and over, there were 99.9 males. The median income for a household in the township was $63,631, and the median income for a family was $70,852. Males had a median income of $45,898 versus $32,656 for females. The per capita income for the township was $27,163. About 1.8% of families and 2.3% of the population were below the poverty line, including 1.4% of those under age 18 and 4.5% of those age 65 or over.

United States presidential election results for Weisenberg Township, Pennsylvania
Year	Republican		Democratic		Third party(ies)	
Year	No.	%	No.	%	No.	%
2024	2,194	64.66%	1,164	34.31%	35	1.03%
2020	2,097	64.25%	1,125	34.47%	42	1.29%
2016	1,885	66.75%	823	29.14%	116	4.11%
2012	1,748	67.02%	822	31.52%	38	1.46%
2008	1,606	62.42%	934	36.30%	33	1.28%
2004	1,575	65.63%	813	33.88%	12	0.50%

== History ==
Weisenburg Township was formed out of the "Backparts of Macunjy" and part of the Allemangel, and was established as a township in 1753. Weisenburg was named for the city of Weissenburg (now Wissembourg), a fortress and town in Alsace, from the region in which the majority of the townspeople had come. The first settlements took place in 1734, on and around the highlands in the vicinity of Ziegel Church.

== Education ==
The township is served by the Northwestern Lehigh School District.

== Public safety ==
Fire protection is provided by the Weisenberg Township Volunteer Fire Department. Emergency medical services are provided by the Cetronia Ambulance Corps, who have a unit stationed at the Weisenberg Township Volunteer Fire Department. Law enforcement is provided by the Pennsylvania State Police.

== Transportation ==
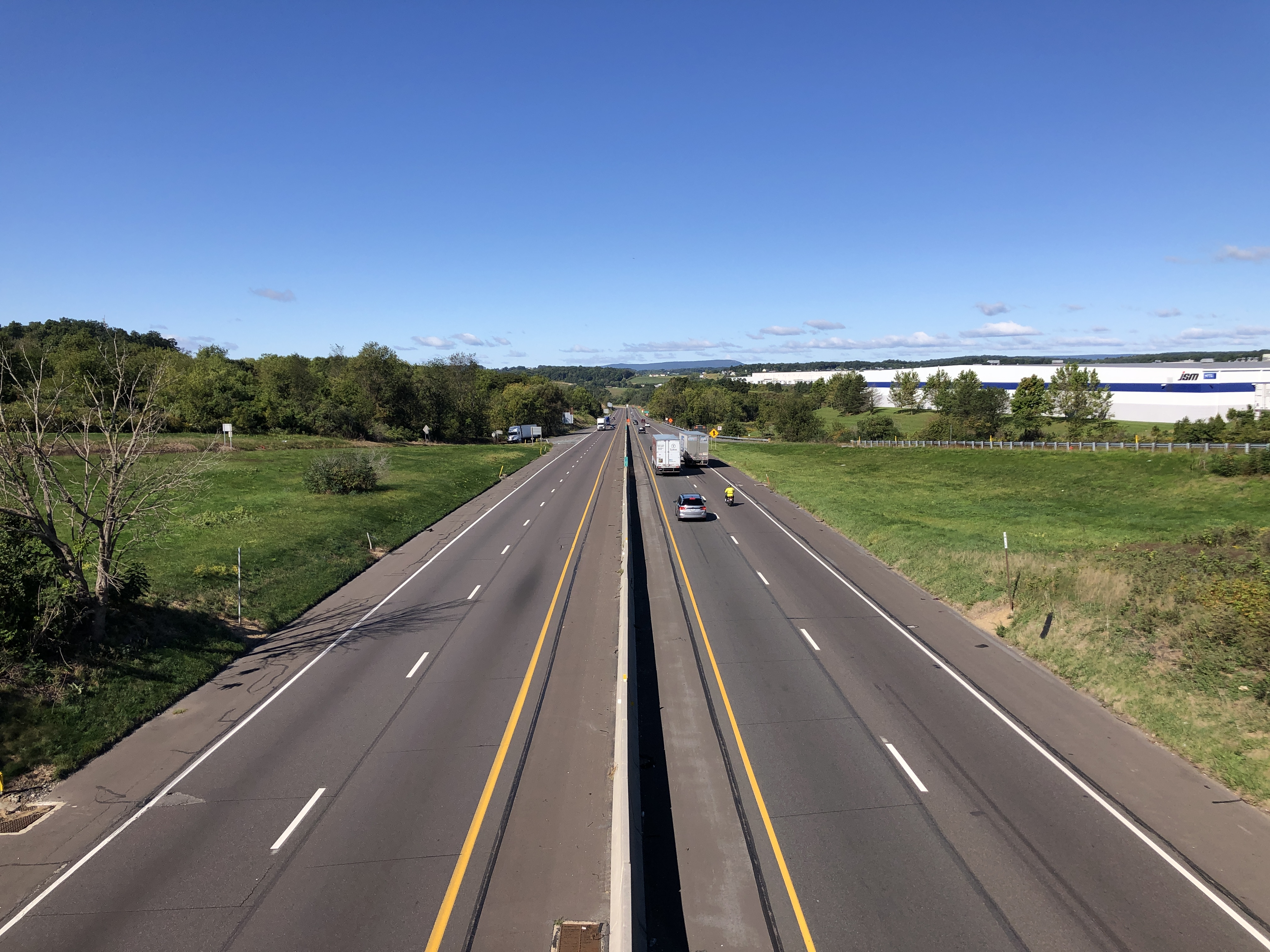
I-78 and US 22 westbound in Weisenberg Township, September 2022

As of 2021, there were 116.63 miles (187.70 km) of public roads in Weisenberg Township, of which 35.03 miles (56.38 km) were maintained by the Pennsylvania Department of Transportation (PennDOT) and 81.60 miles (131.32 km) were maintained by the township.

Weisenberg is crossed east-to-west by Interstate 78 and U.S. Route 22, which has an interchange with north-to-south Pennsylvania Route 863 in the south. Other roads of note in the township include Claussville Road, Holbens Valley Road, Lyon Valley Road, Seipstown Valley Road, and Werleys Corner Road/Sweitzer Road.

== Notable people ==
- Martin Brechall, former fraktur painter
- Daniel Schumacher, former Lutheran pastor and fraktur painter
