= Greenawald, Pennsylvania =

Unincorporated community in Pennsylvania, US

- Unincorporated community
- Location within Pennsylvania
- Coordinates: 40°36′12″N 75°52′20″W
- Country: United States
- State: Pennsylvania
- County: Berks
- Township: Albany
- Elevation: 394 ft (120 m)
- Time zone: UTC-5 (Eastern (EST))
  - Summer (DST): UTC-4 (EDT)
- Area codes: 610 and 484
- GNIS feature ID: 1203716

Greenawald is an unincorporated community in Albany Township in Berks County, Pennsylvania, United States. Greenawald is located along Pennsylvania Route 143 and Maiden Creek in the southern part of the township.
