= Eckville, Pennsylvania =

Unincorporated community in the U.S. state of Pennsylvania

- Unincorporated community
- Location within Pennsylvania Location within the United States
- Coordinates: 40°37′58″N 75°57′10″W
- Country: United States
- State: Pennsylvania
- County: Berks
- Township: Albany
- Time zone: UTC-5 (Eastern (EST))
  - Summer (DST): UTC-4 (EDT)
- ZIP code: 19529
- Area codes: 610 & 484
- GNIS feature ID: 1203492

Eckville is an unincorporated community in far northern Berks County, Pennsylvania, United States. The town is located in an agricultural zone at the base of Blue Mountain, in northwestern Albany Township. Eckville is served by the Kutztown Area School District, and is approximately 17 miles (27 km) from the high school. It is near the head of the Pine Creek, which flows east-southeastward to the Maiden Creek.

Eckville is surrounded by mountains on three sides and is about six miles (9.7 km) west of Kempton. It is served by the Kempton post office, with the zip code of 19529. An access to the Appalachian Trail is just west of the village, which serves as an eastern gateway to Hawk Mountain Sanctuary.

== History ==
A post office called Eckville was established in 1882, and remained in operation until 1888. The community was so named from its location in the corner of Albany Township, Ecke meaning "corner" in German.
