= Daniel Schumacher =

American painter

Daniel Schumacher (c. 1728–1787) was an American fraktur painter. He was the first artist to use fraktur as a method of general record-keeping, rather than a document of important events.

Schumacher was born in Hamburg; his name is found on a ship's manifest from Halifax, Nova Scotia, in 1751, at which time his profession is given as "candidate of theology". His education was poor, and he had no ministerial qualifications; even so, Lutheran congregations in Pennsylvania needed a pastor, and he was able to make a living at the profession. He was active during his career in Berks, Lehigh, and Northampton Counties. Schumacher kept records of various pastoral acts, decorating them with images of flowers and angels; from 1754 until 1773 he kept a similar book of his own, noting each child he baptized or confirmed. Other motifs to appear in his work include the eye of God and hearts. He attempted to depict Lutheran doctrine in six drawings; he drew New Year greetings to friends, and produced other drawings as well. Some of his frakturs contain poems of his own composition. Schumacher married and had a family, and owned a farm of one hundred acres. He died in Weisenberg Township, Pennsylvania. Schumacher was a controversial figure during his life, being accused of drunkenness on numerous occasions, and leaving his first wife soon after their wedding. He eventually ran afoul of his superior, Henry Muhlenberg, who ultimately dismissed him from his post as a pastor; he did, however, have supporters elsewhere in the Lutheran community, and was able to find another position.

Surviving pieces by Schumacher may be found in the collections of the New-York Historical Society, the Winterthur Museum, and the Monroe County Historical Association in Stroudsburg, Pennsylvania.
