= Stein Mill =

- U.S. National Register of Historic Places
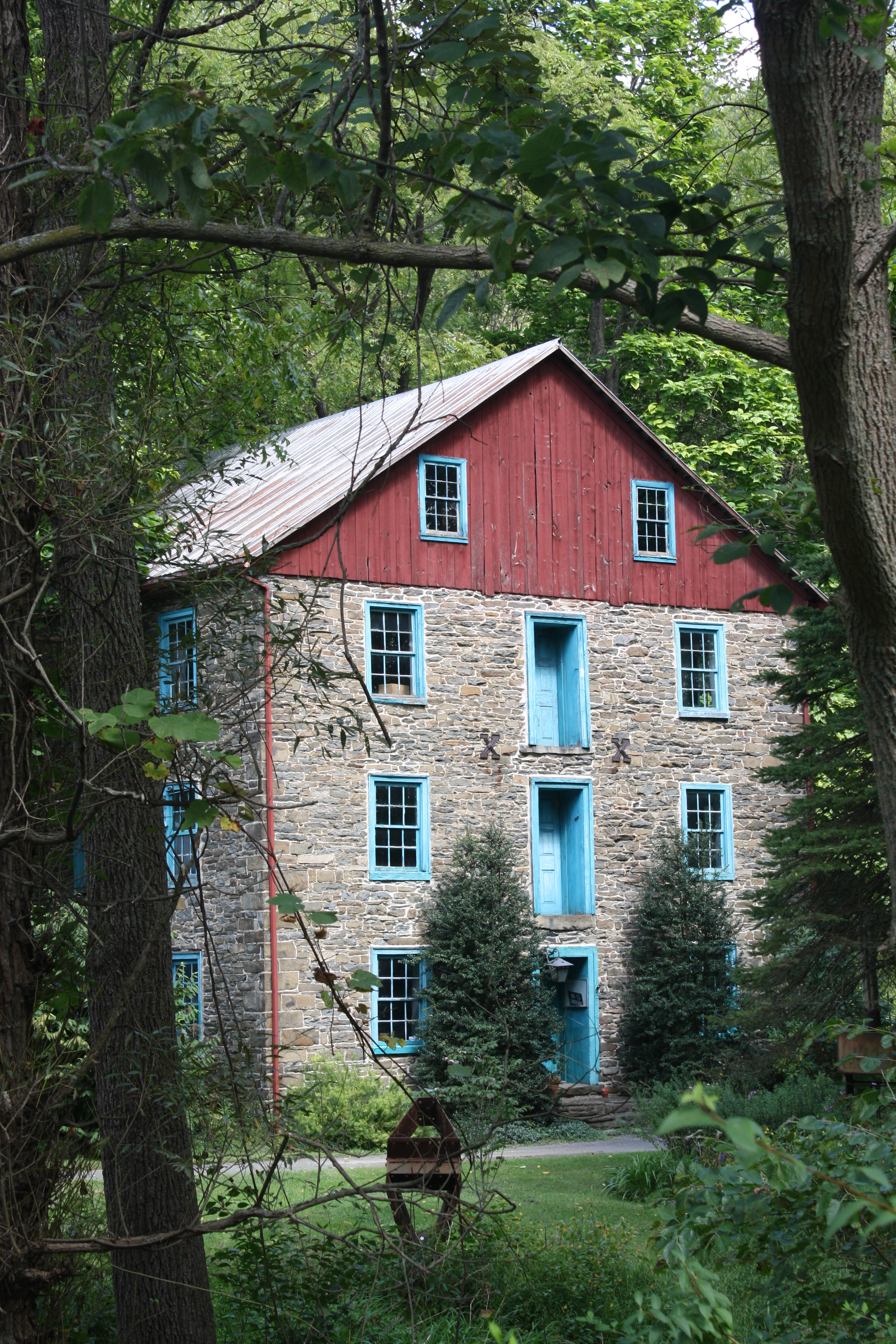
- Stein Mill. September 2013.

- Location within Pennsylvania Location within the United States
- Location: Pennsylvania Route 737 at Mill Creek, Greenwich Township, Pennsylvania
- Coordinates: 40°33′11″N 75°48′12″W
- Area: 2.5 acres (1.0 ha)
- Built: 1857
- Architectural style: Federal
- MPS: Gristmills in Berks County MPS
- NRHP reference No.: 90001632
- Added to NRHP: November 8, 1990

Stein Mill is a historic grist mill located in Greenwich Township, Berks County, Pennsylvania. The mill was built in 1857, and is a 3 1/2-story banked stone building measuring 37 feet, 4 inches, wide by 45 feet, 9 inches, deep. Also on the property is the miller's house; a stone dwelling with the oldest section dating back to about 1816. It operated as a merchant mill until 1899.

It was listed on the National Register of Historic Places in 1990.

== Gallery ==
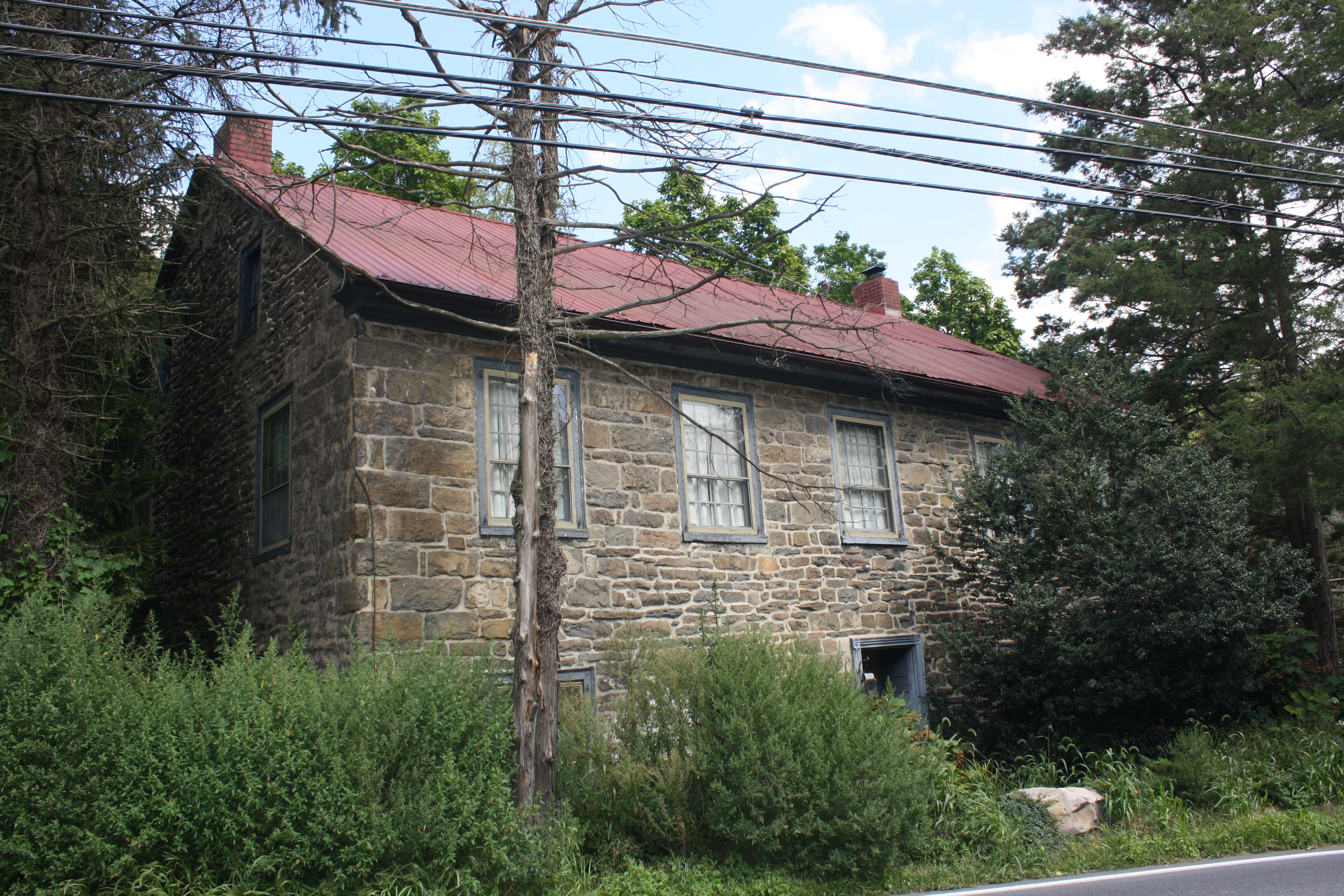
Miller's house

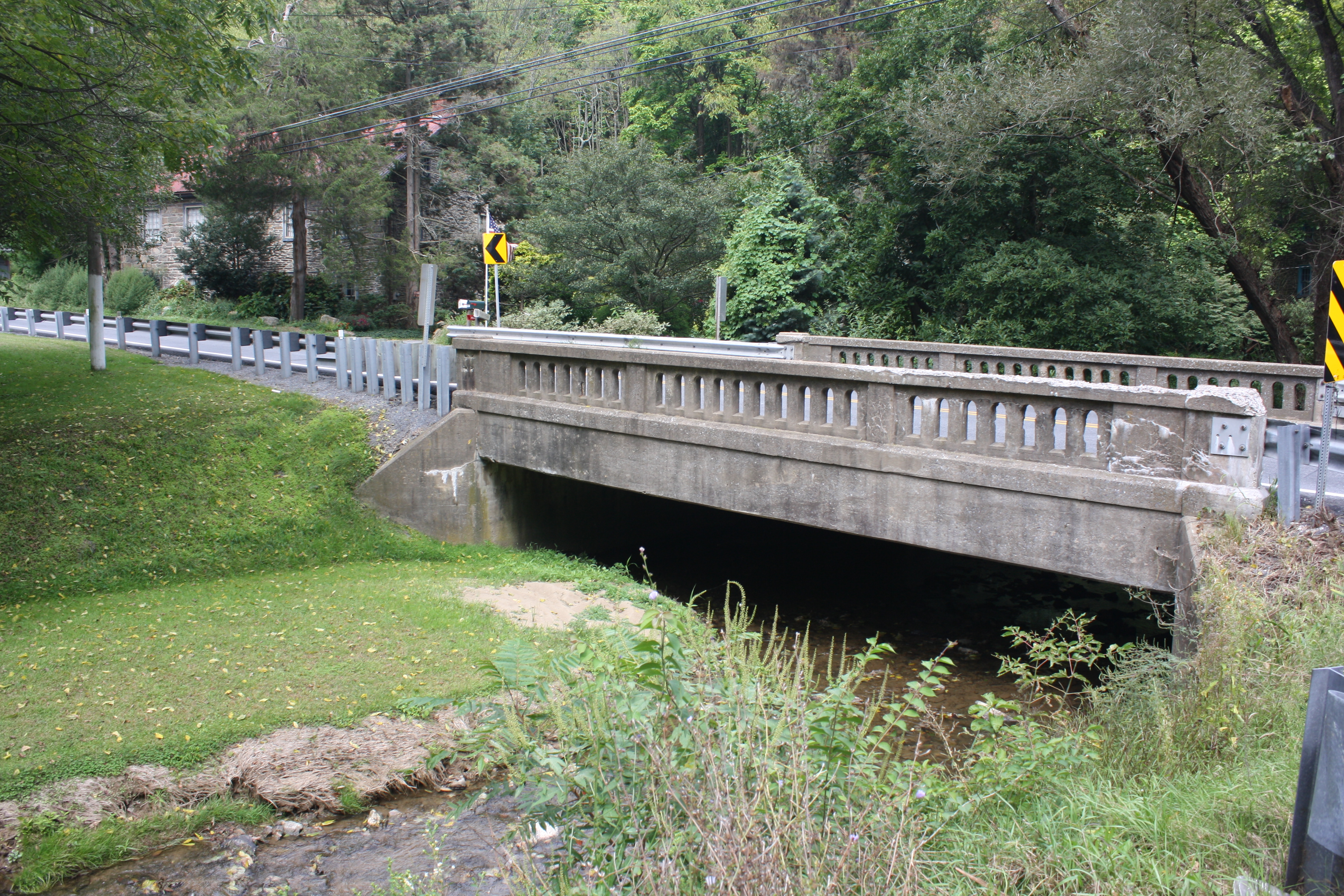
Bridge over mill creek
