= Klinesville, Pennsylvania =

Unincorporated community in Pennsylvania, US

- Unincorporated community
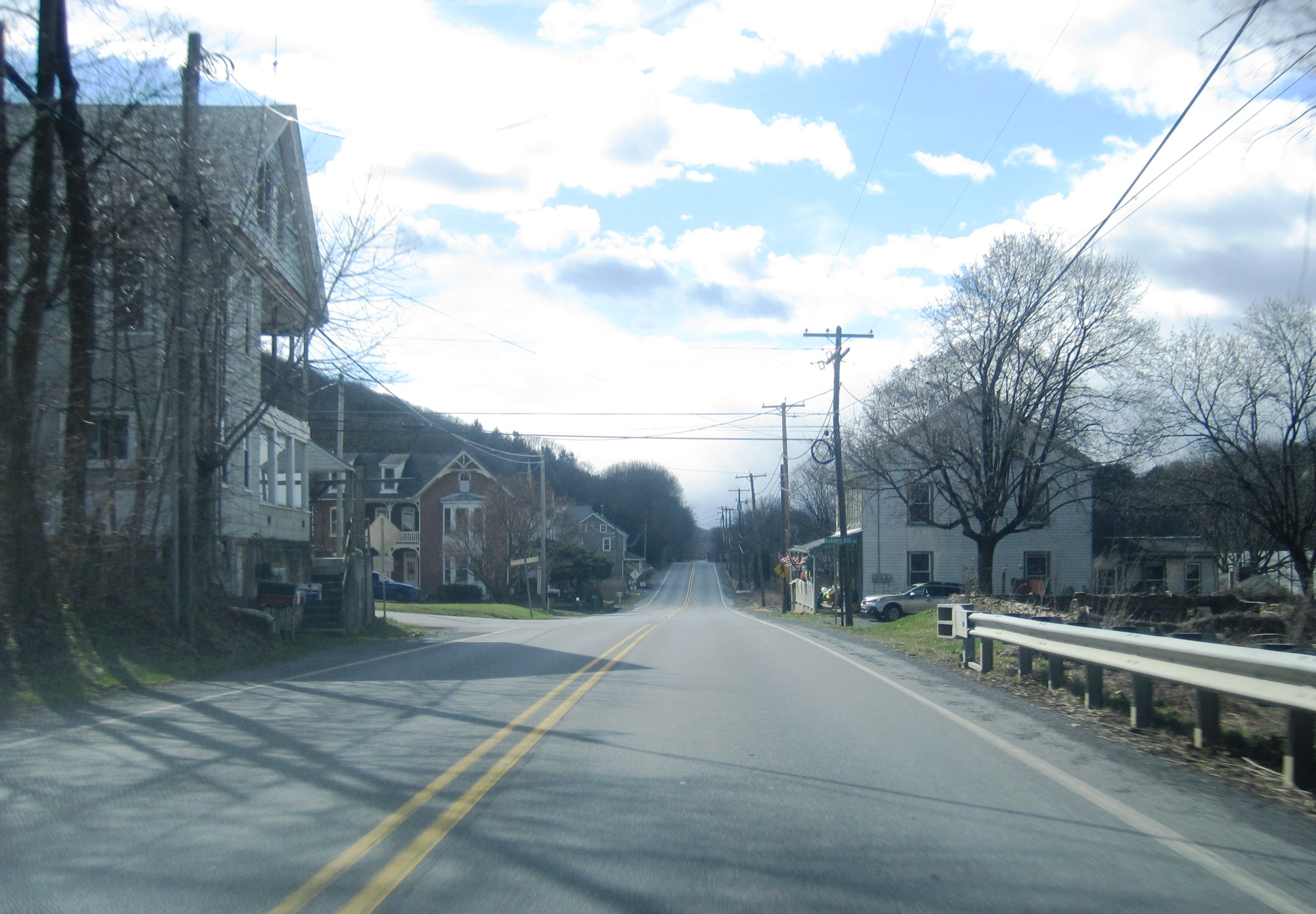
- Klinesville along westbound Old Route 22

- Location within Pennsylvania Location within the United States
- Coordinates: 40°34′37″N 75°51′11″W
- Country: United States
- State: Pennsylvania
- County: Berks
- Township: Greenwich
- Elevation: 427 ft (130 m)
- Time zone: UTC-5 (Eastern (EST))
  - Summer (DST): UTC-4 (EDT)
- Area codes: 610 and 484
- GNIS feature ID: 1178591

Klinesville is an unincorporated community in Greenwich Township in Berks County, Pennsylvania, United States. Klinesville is located at the intersection of Old Route 22 and Kohlers Hill Road. In 2019, several homes in Klinesville were demolished in order to widen Interstate 78/U.S. Route 22.
