= Werleys Corner, Pennsylvania =

Unincorporated community in Pennsylvania, US

- Unincorporated community
- Location within Pennsylvania Location within the United States
- Coordinates: 40°37′59″N 75°43′25″W
- Country: United States
- State: Pennsylvania
- County: Lehigh
- Township: Weisenberg
- Elevation: 705 ft (215 m)

Population
  - Metro: 865,310 (US: 68th)
- Time zone: UTC-5 (Eastern (EST))
  - Summer (DST): UTC-4 (EDT)
- Area codes: 610 and 484
- GNIS feature ID: 1204919

Werleys Corner is an unincorporated community in Weisenberg Township in Lehigh County, Pennsylvania. It is part of the Lehigh Valley, which has a population of 861,899 and is the 68th-most populated metropolitan area in the U.S. as of the 2020 census.
