= Stony Run, Pennsylvania =

Unincorporated community in Pennsylvania, US

- Unincorporated community
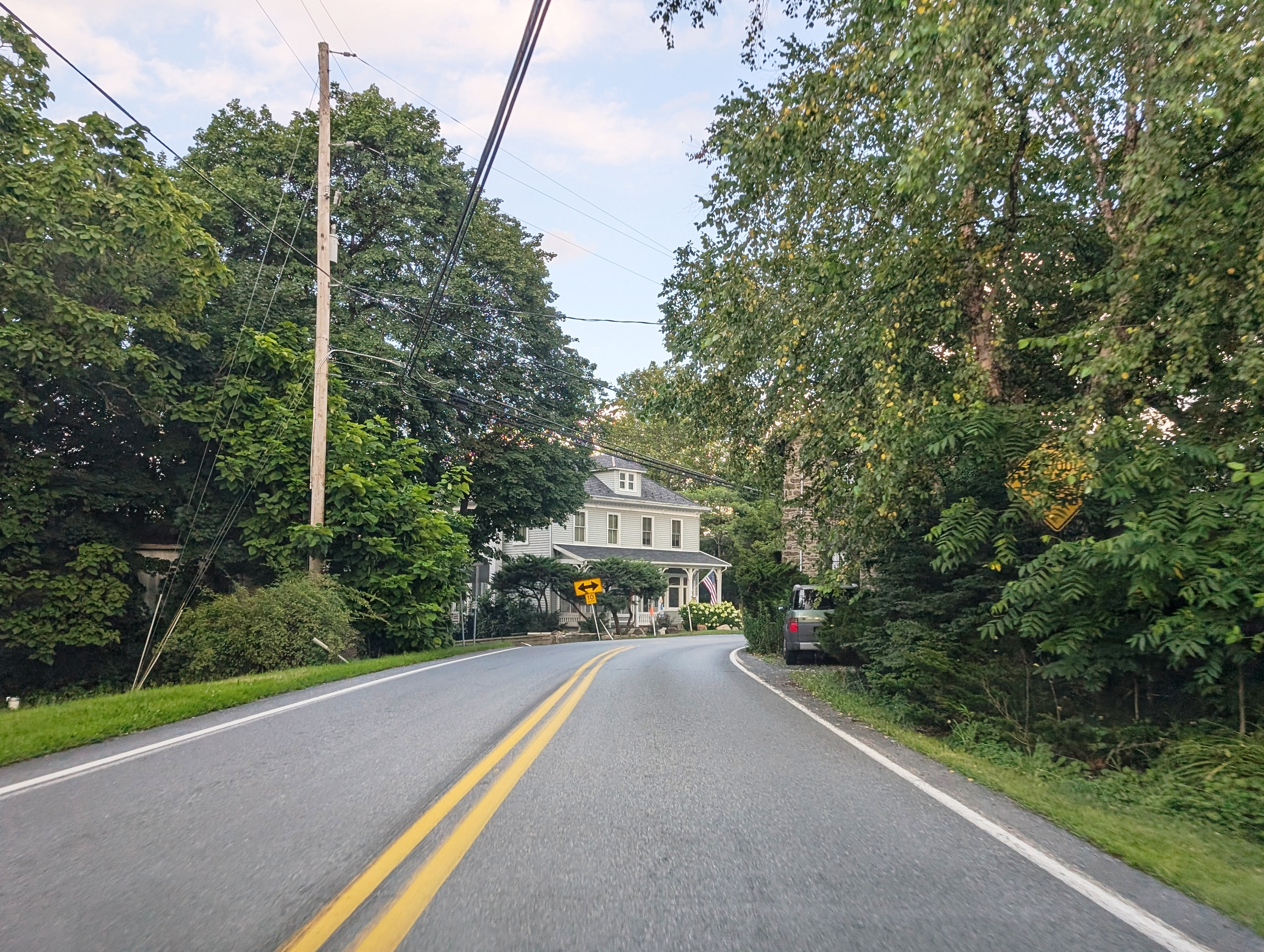
- PA 737 southbound in Stony Run

- Location within Pennsylvania Location within the United States
- Coordinates: 40°37′7″N 75°49′5″W
- Country: United States
- State: Pennsylvania
- County: Berks
- Township: Albany
- Elevation: 663 ft (202 m)
- Time zone: UTC-5 (Eastern (EST))
  - Summer (DST): UTC-4 (EDT)
- Area codes: 610 and 484
- GNIS feature ID: 1188801

Stony Run is an unincorporated community in Albany Township in Berks County, Pennsylvania, United States. Stony Run is located at the intersection of Pennsylvania Route 737 and Wessnerville Road.
