= Merkel Mill =

- U.S. National Register of Historic Places
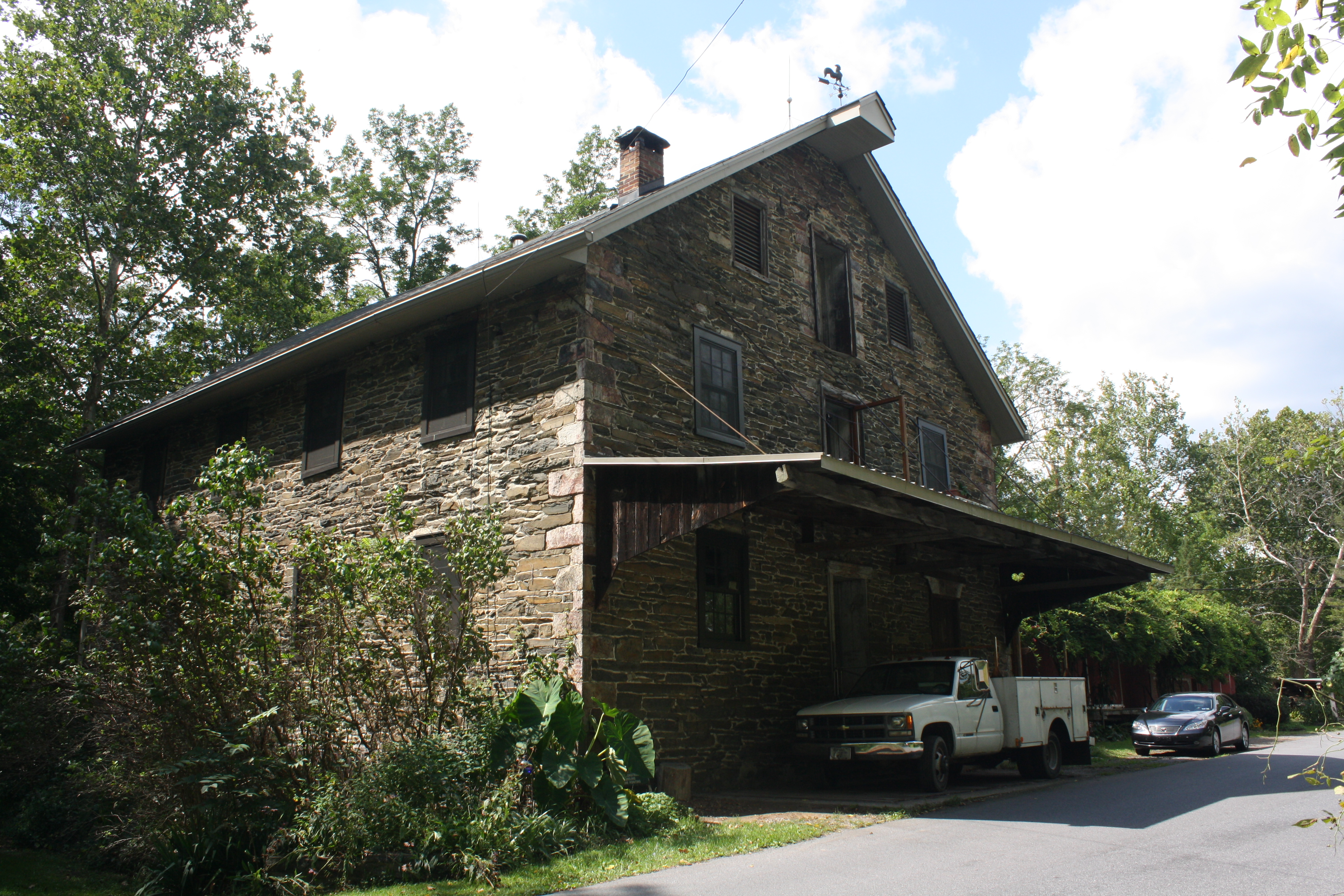
- Merkel Mill. September 2013.

- Location within Pennsylvania Location within the United States
- Location: Dreibelbis Station Road at Maiden Creek, Greenwich Township, Pennsylvania
- Coordinates: 40°34′13″N 75°52′49″W
- Area: 2.3 acres (0.93 ha)
- Built: 1875
- MPS: Gristmills in Berks County MPS
- NRHP reference No.: 90001625
- Added to NRHP: November 8, 1990

The Merkel Mill is an historic grist mill that is located on Maiden Creek in Greenwich Township, Berks County, Pennsylvania, United States.

It was listed on the National Register of Historic Places in 1990.

== History and architectural features ==
This mill, which was rebuilt in 1875, is a 2 1/2-story, banked building with a slate gable roof and a basement. It measures forty feet, five inches, by fifty feet, nine inches, and has a 100-foot frame storage addition. Also located on the property are the contributing watercourses, including the dam, pond, and races. It operated as a merchant mill and ceased operations in the 1950s.

== Gallery ==
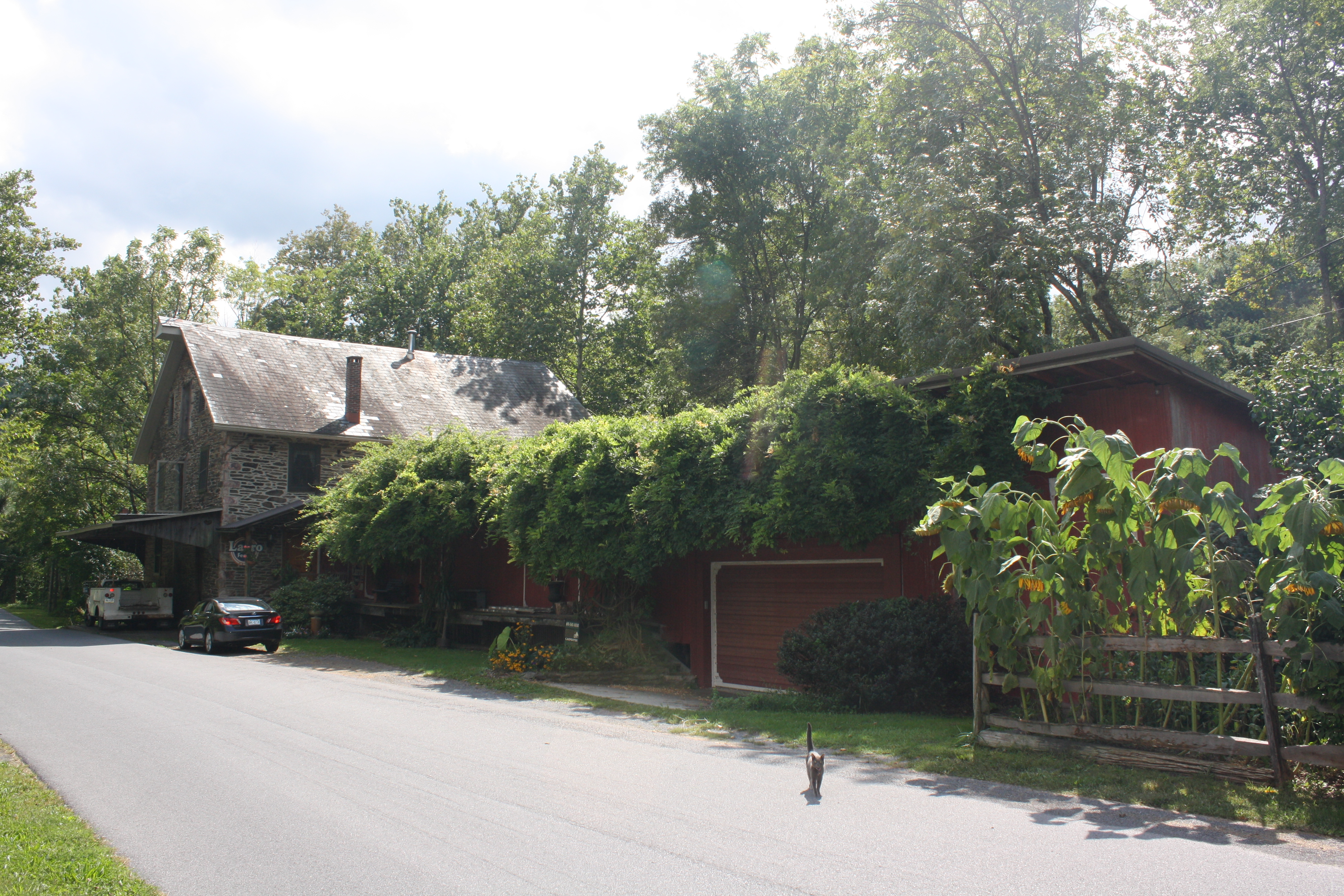
Mill and storage addition
