= Edenburg, Pennsylvania =

Unincorporated community in Pennsylvania, US

- Census-designated place
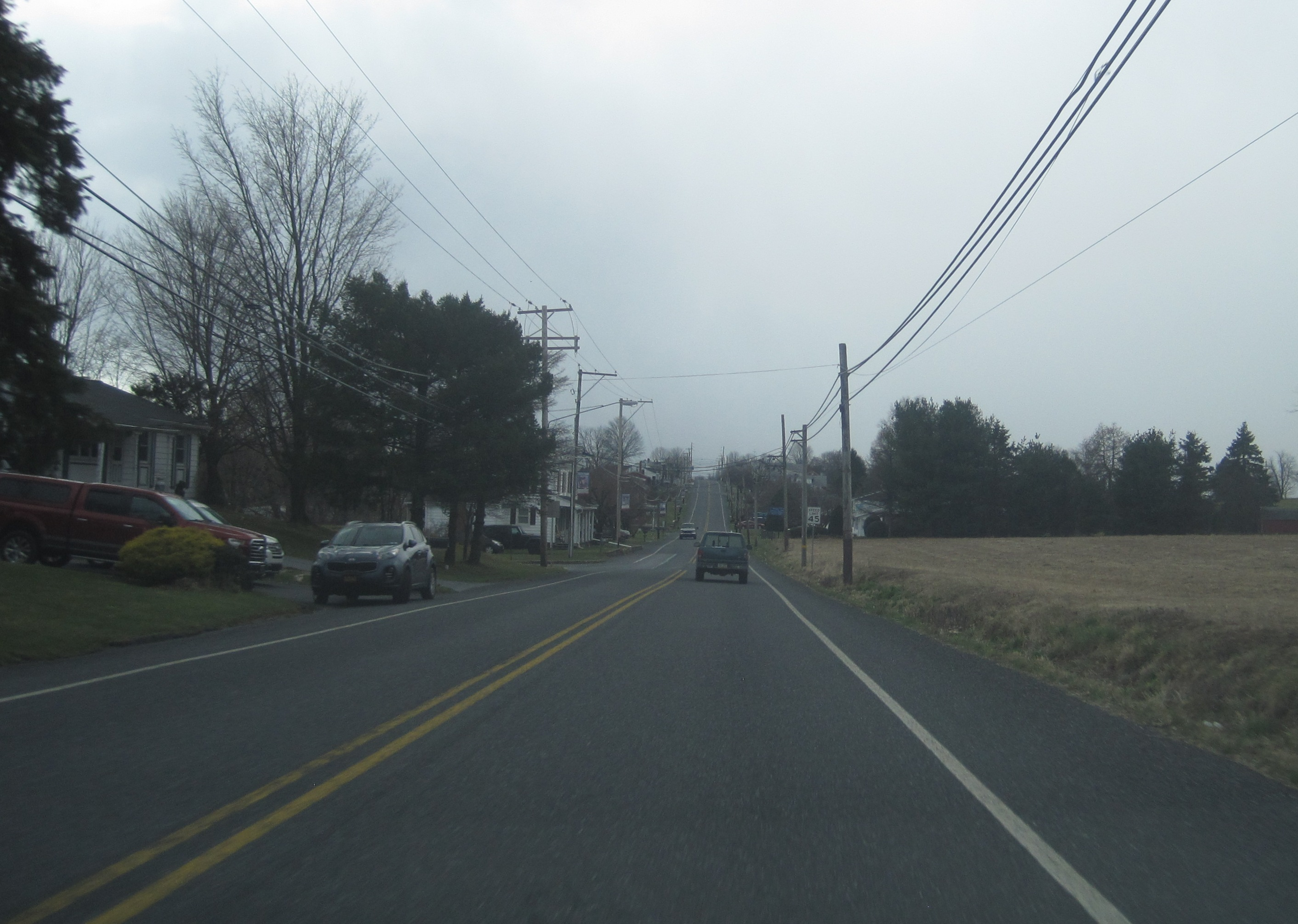
- Edenburg along westbound Old Route 22

- Location within Pennsylvania Location within the United States
- Coordinates: 40°33′59″N 75°57′38″W
- Country: United States
- State: Pennsylvania
- County: Berks
- Township: Windsor

Area
  - Total: 0.61 sq mi (1.59 km^{2})
  - Land: 0.58 sq mi (1.49 km^{2})
  - Water: 0.039 sq mi (0.10 km^{2})

Population (2020)
  - Total: 708
  - Density: 1,226.8/sq mi (473.66/km^{2})
- Time zone: UTC-5 (Eastern (EST))
  - Summer (DST): UTC-4 (EDT)
- ZIP code: 19526
- Area codes: 484, 610 and 835
- FIPS code: 42-22352

Edenburg is a census-designated place in Windsor Township, Berks County, Pennsylvania, United States. It is located along Old Route 22, and very close to I-78, approximately two miles from Hamburg. As of the 2010 census, the population was 681 residents.

== Demographics ==
Historical population
Census	Pop.	Note	%±
2020	708		—
U.S. Decennial Census
