= Krumsville, Pennsylvania =

Unincorporated community in Pennsylvania, US

- Unincorporated community
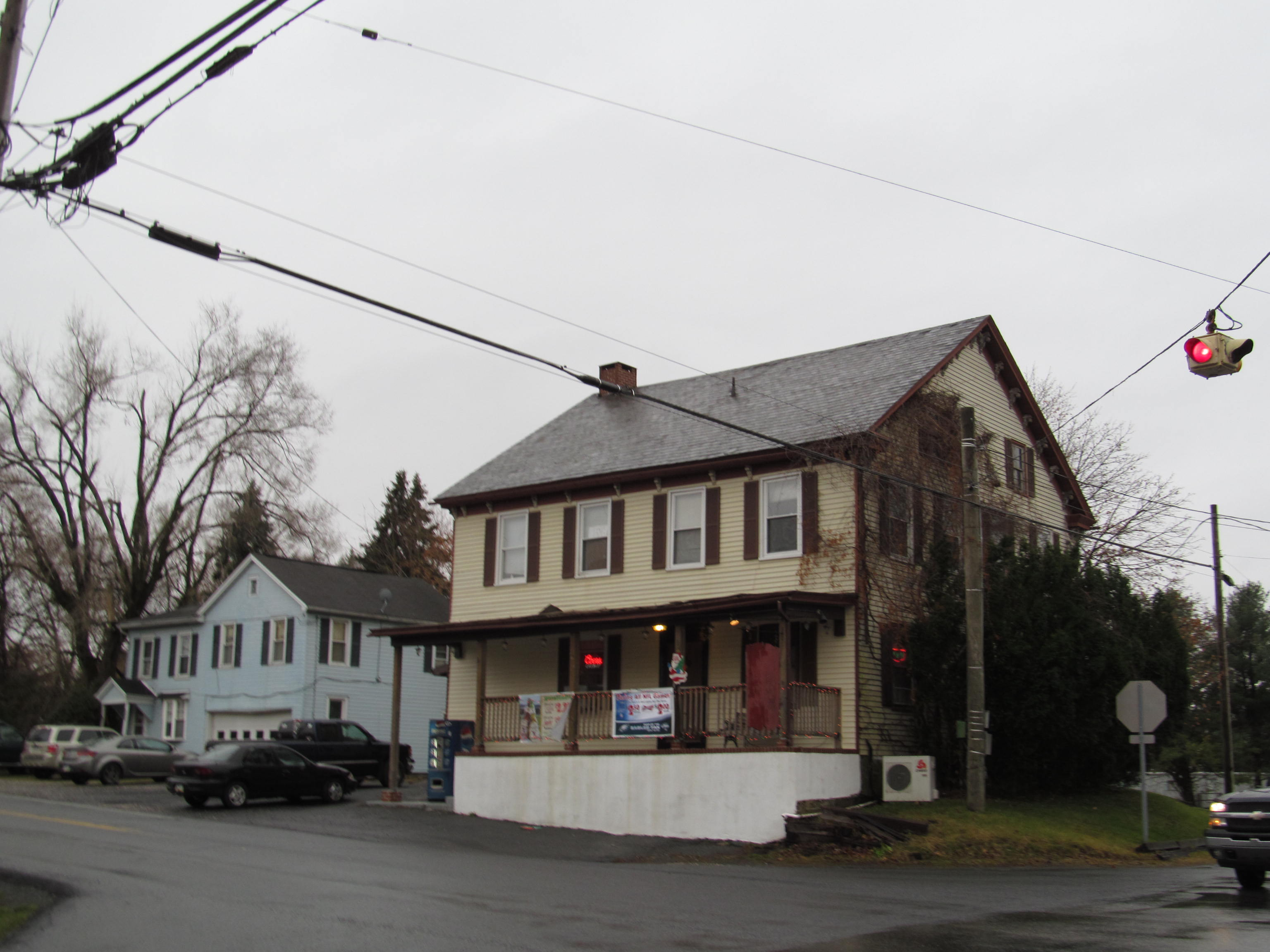
- Krumsville Inn

- Location within Pennsylvania Location within the United States
- Coordinates: 40°34′43″N 75°47′50″W
- Country: United States
- State: Pennsylvania
- County: Berks
- Township: Greenwich
- Elevation: 755 ft (230 m)
- Time zone: UTC-5 (Eastern (EST))
  - Summer (DST): UTC-4 (EDT)
- ZIP code: 19534
- Area codes: 610 and 484
- GNIS feature ID: 1178696

Krumsville is an unincorporated community in Greenwich Township in Berks County, Pennsylvania, United States. It is located at the intersection of Pennsylvania Route 737 and Old Route 22. The interchange with Interstate 78/U.S. Route 22 was redesigned and PA 737 now crosses I-78/US 22 on a new bridge. Important buildings in the area include the Greenwich-Lenhartsville Elementary School, Krumsville Inn, Mt. Zion's Church (Home to Boy Scout Troop 104), and Dietrich's Meats.

Less than half a mile east of Krumsville on Old Route 22 is the town of Grimville. It is a smaller town than Krumsville, and is often considered to be a part of the Krumsville area. Thus, the two towns are sometimes confused with each other.
