= Albany, Pennsylvania =

Unincorporated community in Pennsylvania, US

- Unincorporated community
- Location within Pennsylvania Location within the United States
- Coordinates: 40°23′33″N 75°59′40″W
- Country: United States
- State: Pennsylvania
- County: Berks
- Township: Albany
- Time zone: UTC-5 (EST)
  - Summer (DST): UTC-4 (EDT)
- Area code: 610

Albany is an unincorporated community in far northern Berks County, Pennsylvania. The village is located in central Albany Township, the northernmost and most sparsely populated of all the townships in Berks County.

== History ==
A post office called Albany was established in 1845, and remained in operation until 1953. The community took its name from Albany Township.
