= Grimville, Pennsylvania =

Unincorporated community in Pennsylvania, US

- Unincorporated community
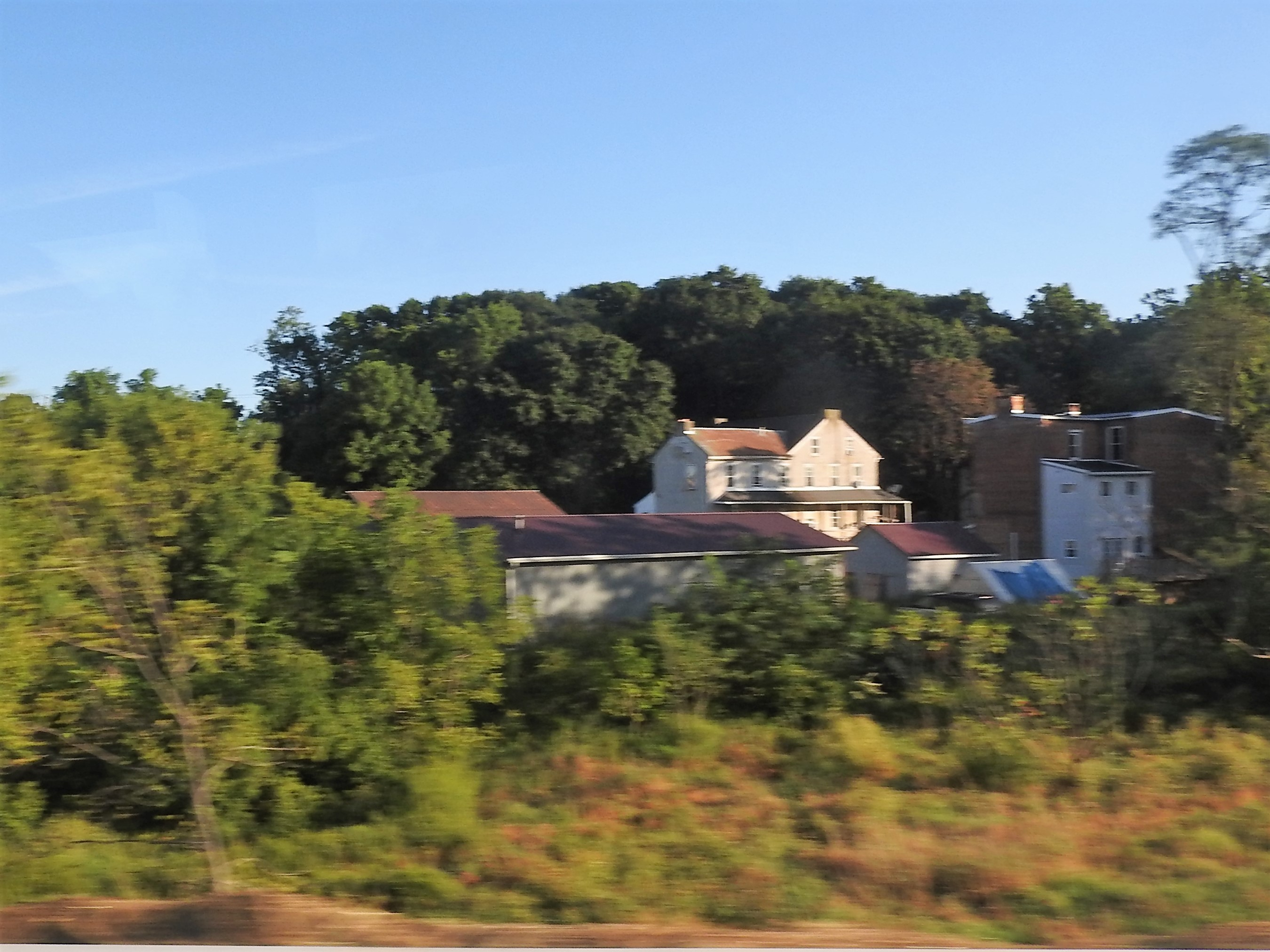

- Location within Pennsylvania Location within the United States
- Coordinates: 40°34′40″N 75°47′5″W
- Country: United States
- State: Pennsylvania
- County: Berks
- Township: Greenwich
- Elevation: 738 ft (225 m)
- Time zone: UTC-5 (Eastern (EST))
  - Summer (DST): UTC-4 (EDT)
- ZIP code: 19530
- Area codes: 610 and 484
- GNIS feature ID: 1203724

Grimville is an unincorporated community in Greenwich Township in Berks County, Pennsylvania, United States. Grimville is located at the intersection of Old Route 22 and Long Lane. It is situated just east of Krumsville with its access to Interstate 78.
