= Martin Brechall =

American painter

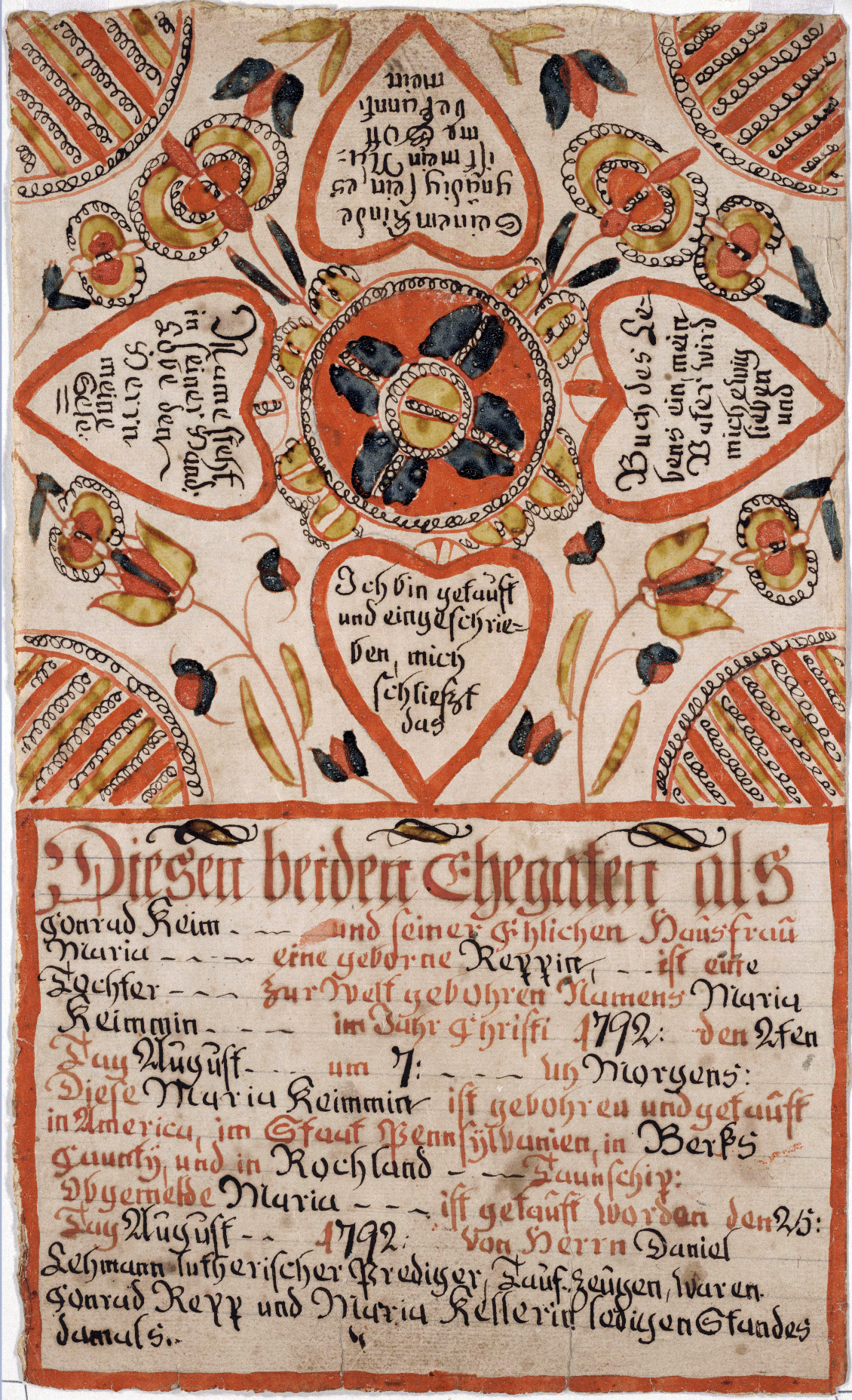
Birth and Baptismal Certificate 1792

Martin Brechall (c. 1757–1831) was an American fraktur artist.

European in origin, Brechall came to the Thirteen Colonies sometime before the American Revolution, in which he fought; an 1818 pension application states that he enlisted in April 1777 and reenlisted until 1783. During the war he saw action at the battles of Short Hills, Brandywine, and Monmouth, among others, and was also present at the surrender of Charles Cornwallis.

Later in life, Brechall became a schoolmaster in Weisenberg Township, Lehigh County, Pennsylvania. He produced baptismal certificates for children in the neighborhood, residents of about a dozen towns in Lehigh and Berks Counties. A handful of pieces from Penn Township, at the time in Northumberland County, also exist, suggesting that he may have worked in the vicinity for a time; other pieces have also been found in Schuylkill County. Brechall's work is typical of the style; however, he had certificates of his own design printed to speed the decoration process along, and he signed many of these, in the process becoming among the first fraktur artists to be named. Most of his pieces are painted in a palette of red and black, using hearts and rectangles as design elements. Sometimes he would add decoration such as an angel's head or an eagle, or a crown containing the alphabet. Besides baptismal certificates he designed a house blessing, a prayer for children, and presentation frakturs, many for the children he taught. He lived in an area inhabited mainly by members of the Lutheran and Reformed Churches, and consequently his art was produced for members of both faiths.

Five works by Brechall are owned by the Philadelphia Museum of Art. A Child's Prayer of Thanksgiving is owned by the Museum of Fine Arts, Houston. Other work is in the collections of the Library of Congress, the Free Library of Philadelphia and Franklin and Marshall College.
