= Kutz-Bauer v Freie und Hansestadt Hamburg =

EU labour law case on discrimination

- Court: European Court of Justice

Kutz-Bauer v Freie und Hansestadt Hamburg [2003] ECR I-02741 (2002) C-187/00 is an EU labour law case, which held that in justifying discrimination, budgetary considerations alone cannot be decisive.

== Facts ==
Germany had a scheme, that it argued combated unemployment. Any employee who was recruited from unemployment and over the age of 55 could receive 70% of their wage if they worked part-time. The government would make up any shortfall compared to the wage of the employer. Part-timers could also opt to condense their work into a full-time job, but have their pay spread over till retirement. Frau Kutz Bauer was age 60 and wanted to work two and a half years, and then retire. However, she was 60, and already eligible for the German state pension. Because of this she was ineligible for the part-time work scheme. She argued that only men could benefit between ages 60 and 65 and therefore the scheme breached the Equal Treatment Directive.

== Judgment ==
ECJ said it was up to member states to choose ‘aims which they pursue in employment matters. The Court has recognised that the Member States have a broad margin of discretion in exercising that power…’ (C-167/97 Seymour-Smith and Perez [1999] ECR I-623, para 74) and the encouragement of recruitment is a legitimate aim.

58 But ‘mere generalisations concerning the capacity of a specific measure to encourage recruitment are not enough to show that the aim of the disputed provision is unrelated to any discrimination based on sex or to provide evidence on the basis of which it could reasonably be considered that the means chosen are or could be suitable for achieving that aim. 59 ... although budgetary considerations may underlie a Member State's choice of social policy and influence the nature or scope of the social protection measures which it wishes to adopt, they do not in themselves constitute an aim pursued by that policy and cannot therefore justify discrimination against one of the sexes (Case C-343/92 De Weerd and Others [1994] ECR I-571, paragraph 35).

And the City of Hamburg, as a public body, cannot justify discrimination from a scheme of part-time work on grounds of increased costs.
