= Albany Township, Berks County, Pennsylvania =

Township in Pennsylvania, US

Albany Township
- Township
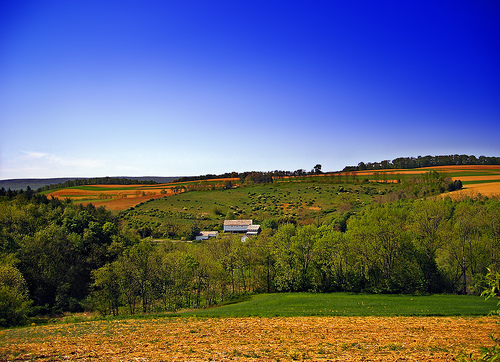
- A farm in Albany Township

- Logo

- Location of Albany Township in Pennsylvania Location in the United States
- Coordinates: 40°37′41″N 75°53′14″W
- Country: United States
- State: Pennsylvania
- County: Berks

Area
  - Total: 39.83 sq mi (103.15 km^{2})
  - Land: 39.76 sq mi (102.97 km^{2})
  - Water: 0.069 sq mi (0.18 km^{2})
- Elevation: 515 ft (157 m)

Population (2020)
  - Total: 1,664 ▼
  - Estimate (2021): 1,665
  - Density: 43.5/sq mi (16.78/km^{2})
- Time zone: UTC-5 (EST)
  - Summer (DST): UTC-4 (EDT)
- Area code: 610
- FIPS code: 42-011-00588
- Website: www.albanytwpberks.org

Albany Township is a township in Berks County, Pennsylvania, United States. The population was 1,664 at the 2020 census. The township hall is located in Kempton.

== Geography ==
According to the U.S. Census Bureau, the township has a total area of 40.2 square miles (104 km^{2}), all land. It is in the Schuylkill watershed and the northern and western portions are on Blue Mountain. Its villages include Albany, Eckville, Greenawald, Kempton, Stony Run, and Trexler.

Albany Township has a humid continental climate (Dfa/Dfb) and the hardiness zones are 6a and 6b. The average monthly temperatures in Kempton range from 28.2 °F in January to 73.1 °F in July.

Adjacent townships

East Brunswick, West Penn
		north	northeast	Lynn
West Brunswick	west	self	east	Weisenberg
Windsor	southwest	south
Greenwich

== Demographics ==
Historical population
Census	Pop.	Note	%±
1980	1,381		—
1990	1,547		12.0%
2000	1,662		7.4%
2010	1,724		3.7%
2020	1,664		−3.5%
2021 (est.)	1,665		0.1%
U.S. Decennial Census

At the 2010 census, there were 1,724 people, 667 households, and 489 families in the township. The population density was 42.9 people per square mile. There were 721 housing units at an average density of 17.9/sq mi . The racial makeup of the township was 98.6% White, 0.5% African American, 0.1% Asian, 0.1% from other races, and 0.6% from two or more races. Hispanic or Latino of any race were 1.4%.

There were 667 households, 28.6% had children under the age of 18 living with them, 63.3% were married couples living together, 5.4% had a female householder with no husband present, and 26.7% were non-families. 21.9% of households were made up of individuals, and 7.9% were one person aged 65 or older. The average household size was 2.58 and the average family size was 3.00.

The age distribution was 22.9% under the age of 18, 6.4% from 18 to 24, 29.4% from 25 to 44, 35.0% from 45 to 64, and 14.8% 65 or older. The median age was 44.8 years. For every 100 females, there were 107.0 males.

In 1999, The median household income was $46,830, and the median family income was $50,455. Males had a median income of $36,553 versus $25,603 for females. The per capita income for the township was $21,509. About 2.7% of families and 4.0% of the population were below the poverty line, including 1.6% of those under age 18 and 6.0% of those age 65 or over.

== Recreation ==
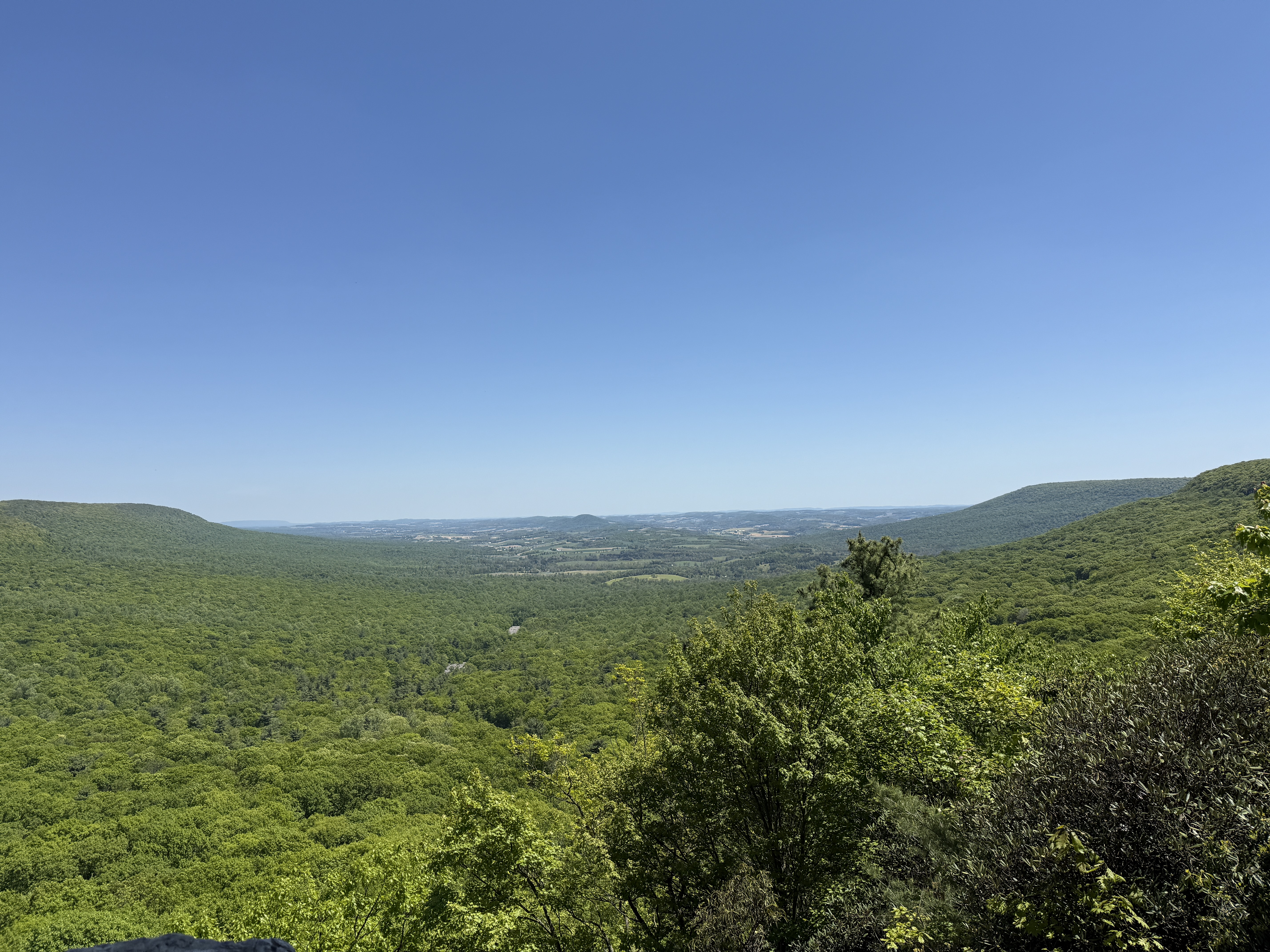
Albany Township from lookout at Hawk Mountain Sanctuary

Albany Township is home to Hawk Mountain Sanctuary and the Wanamaker, Kempton & Southern heritage railroad. The Kempton Community Center hosts the annual Pennsylvania Renewable Energy Festival in September.

Portions of the Pennsylvania State Game Lands Number 106, which passes a part of the Appalachian National Scenic Trail, is located along the northern border of the township.

== Transportation ==
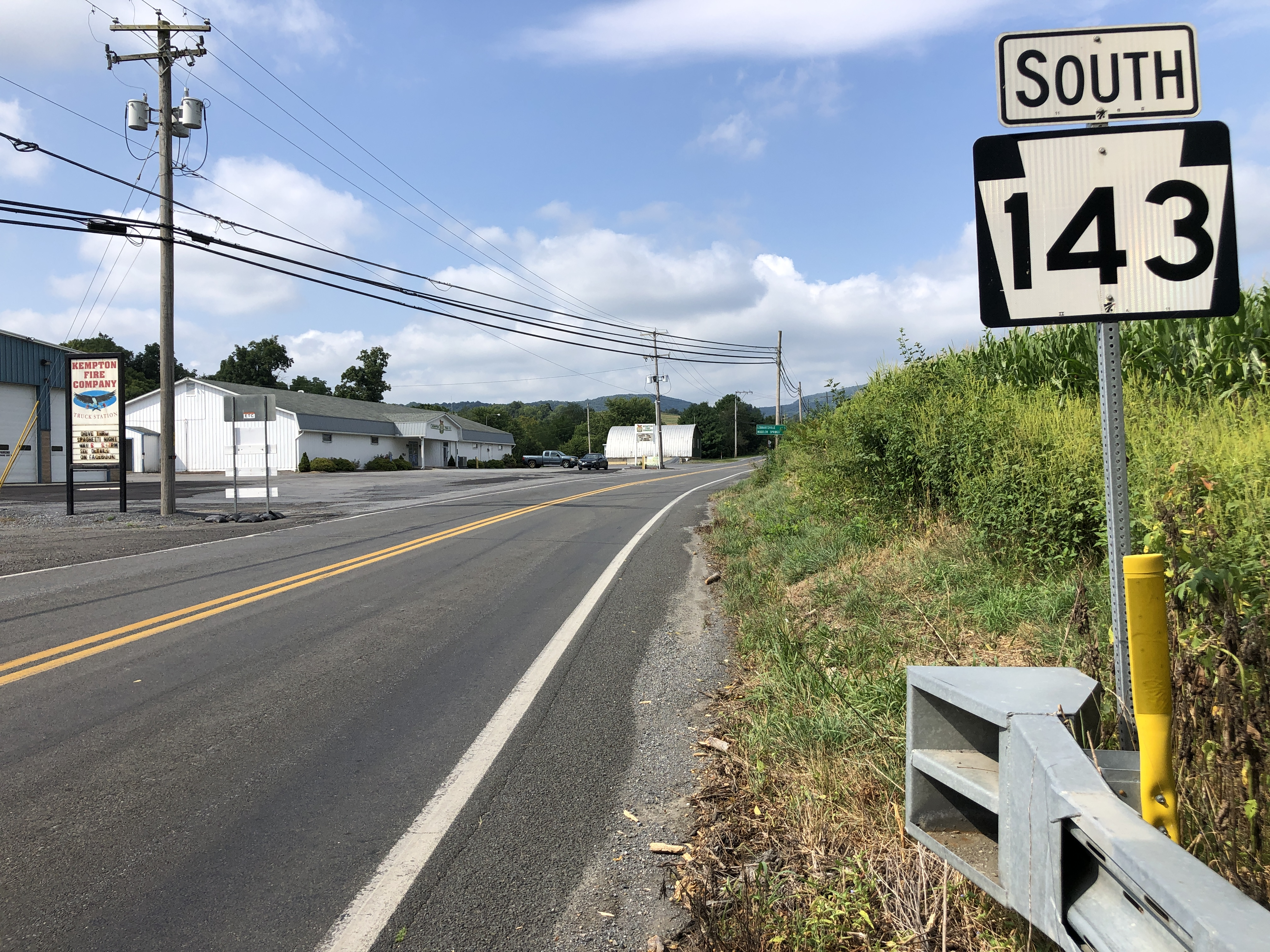
PA 143 southbound in Albany Township

As of 2007, there were 75.49 miles (121.49 km) of public roads in Albany Township, of which 19.59 miles (31.53 km) were maintained by the Pennsylvania Department of Transportation (PennDOT) and 55.90 miles (89.96 km) were maintained by the township.

Numbered routes in Albany Township are Pennsylvania Route 143 and Pennsylvania Route 737, which ends on PA 143 in Kempton. East–west roads of note are Hawk Mountain Road/Stony Run Valley Road and Kistler Valley Road.
