= Lake Ontelaunee =

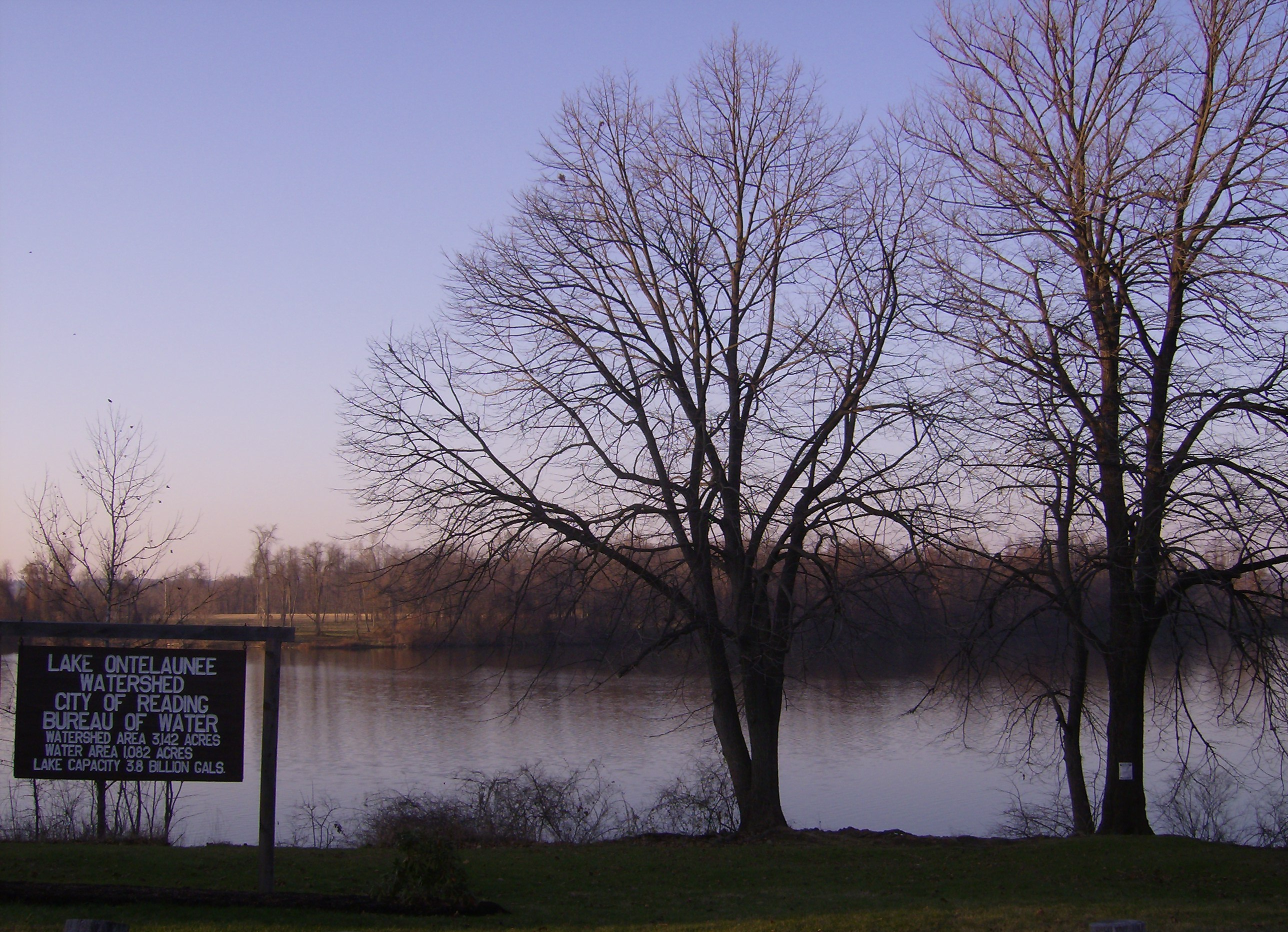
- Lake Ontelaunee, November 2007

- Location within Pennsylvania Location within the United States
- Location: Berks County, Pennsylvania
- Coordinates: 40°27′44″N 75°55′17″W
- Type: reservoir
- Basin countries: United States
- Surface area: 1,082 acres (438 ha)
- Surface elevation: 302 ft (92 m)

Lake Ontelaunee is a 1,082-acre (4.38 km^{2}) reservoir that is located in Berks County, Pennsylvania. Blue Marsh Lake, another artificial reservoir, is the largest lake in Berks County, making Lake Ontelaunee the second-largest lake.

== History and features ==
Owned by the City of Reading, Lake Ontelaunee was created in 1926 by the damming of Maiden Creek in order to extend and improve the water supply to the city. A large dedication ceremony was held in 1929.

In addition, the lake provides a venue for hunters, fishermen, and hikers. The lake supports a large and varied fish population including panfish, largemouth bass, common carp, bullhead catfish, channel catfish, alewife, white perch, chain pickerel, and a small northern pike population, and others. No boats are allowed on this lake and there is also no swimming allowed.
