= Kutz's Mill Bridge =

- U.S. National Register of Historic Places
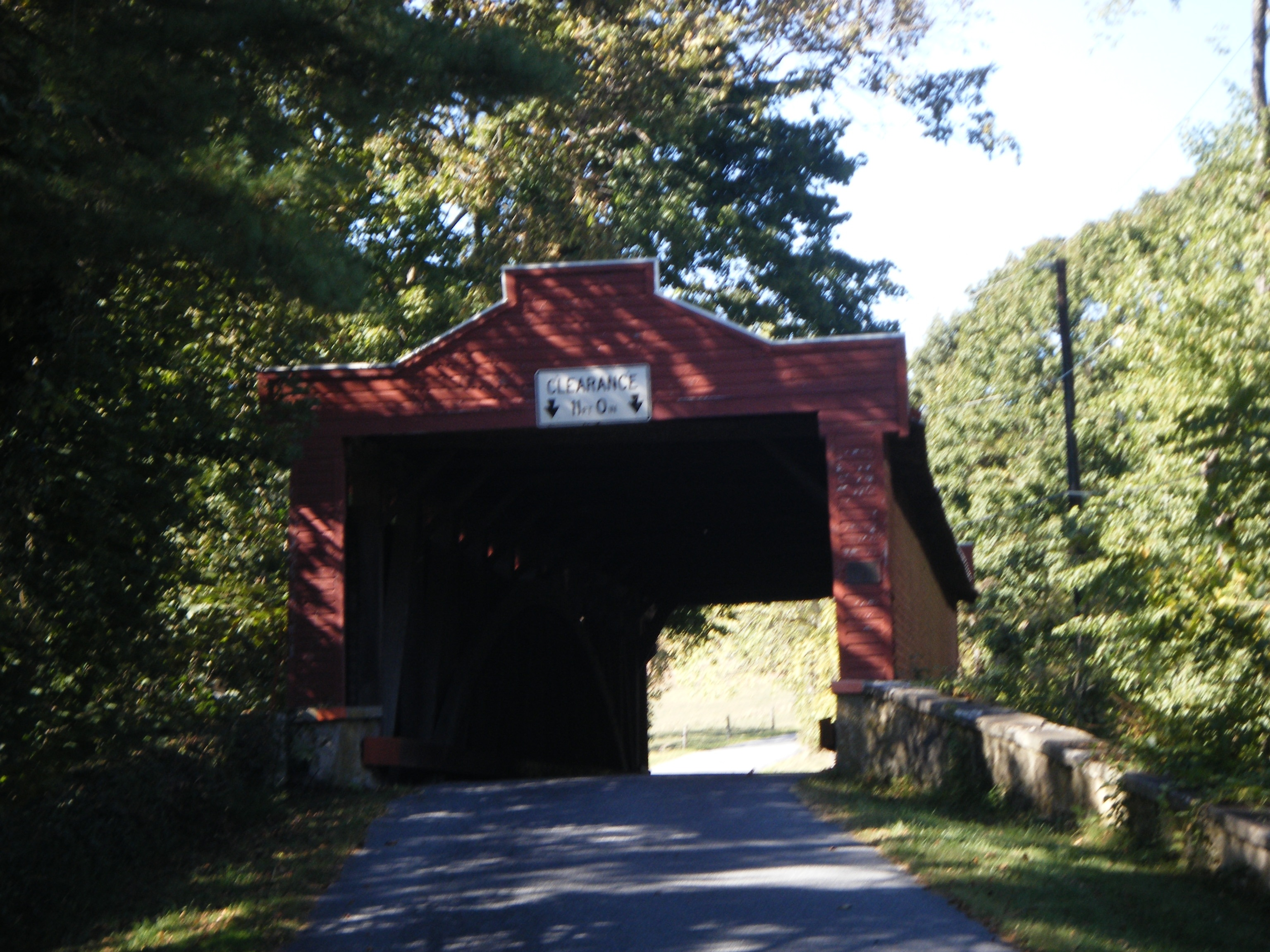
- Kutz's Mill Covered Bridge, September 2010

- Location within Pennsylvania Location within the United States
- Location: Northwest of Kutztown on Township 798, Greenwich Township, Pennsylvania
- Coordinates: 40°32′01″N 75°48′20″W
- Area: less than one acre
- Built: 1854
- Built by: Bitner & Ahrens
- MPS: Berks County Covered Bridges TR
- NRHP reference No.: 81000531
- Added to NRHP: February 23, 1981

Kutz's Mill Bridge is an historic, wooden covered bridge in Greenwich Township in Berks County, Pennsylvania, United States.

It was listed on the National Register of Historic Places in 1981.

== History and architectural features ==
Built in 1854, this historic structure is a 93-foot-long (28 m), Burr Truss bridge that crosses the Sacony Creek. It is one of five covered bridges remaining in Berks County. As the name implies, it leads to the Kutz Mill.
