= Kuts =

Kuts is a Ukrainian and Russian surname (Ukrainian: Куц, Russian: Куц or Ukrainian: Куць). Notable people with the surname include:

- Margaret Kuts (born 2006), Canadian rhythmic gymnast
- Oleksandr Kuts (1976–), Ukrainian political military commander
- Vladimir Kuts (1927–1975), Soviet long-distance runner
- Vladimir Kuts (soldier) (1927–2022), Soviet soldier
- Ivan Kuts (2000-), Ukrainian footballer

== See also ==
- KUTS
- Kutz (disambiguation)
