= Trexler, Berks County, Pennsylvania =

Unincorporated community in Pennsylvania, US

Trexler, Pennsylvania
- Unincorporated community
- Location within Pennsylvania
- Coordinates: 40°38′8″N 75°51′12″W
- Country: United States
- State: Pennsylvania
- County: Berks
- Township: Albany
- Elevation: 420 ft (130 m)
- Time zone: UTC-5 (Eastern (EST))
  - Summer (DST): UTC-4 (EDT)
- Area codes: 610 and 484
- GNIS feature ID: 1204827

Trexler is an unincorporated community in Albany Township in Berks County, Pennsylvania, United States. Trexler is located at the intersection of Pennsylvania Route 143 and Old Philly Pike.
