= Greenwich Township, Pennsylvania =

Township in Pennsylvania, US

Greenwich Township
- Township
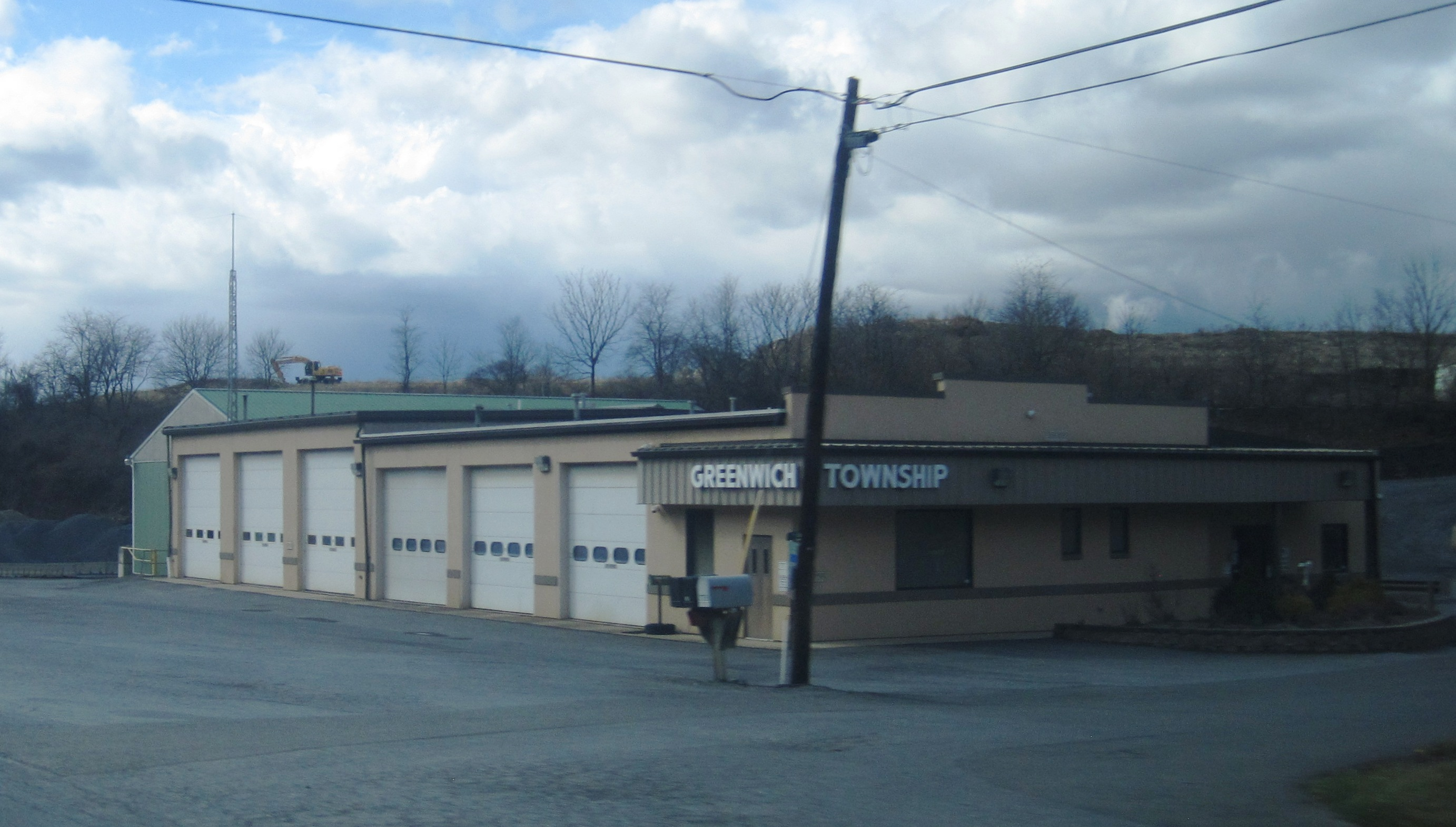
- Town hall

- Location of Greenwich Township in Berks County, Pennsylvania (left) and of Berks County in Pennsylvania (right)

- Location of Greenwich Township in Pennsylvania Greenwich Township (the United States)
- Coordinates: 40°35′00″N 75°52′59″W
- Country: United States
- State: Pennsylvania
- County: Berks
- Founded: 1749

Area
  - Total: 31.10 sq mi (80.54 km^{2})
  - Land: 31.00 sq mi (80.29 km^{2})
  - Water: 0.097 sq mi (0.25 km^{2})
- Elevation: 279 ft (85 m)

Population (2020)
  - Total: 3,438 ▼
  - Estimate (2021): 3,431
  - Density: 119.7/sq mi (46.23/km^{2})
- Time zone: UTC-5 (EST)
  - Summer (DST): UTC-4 (EDT)
- ZIP codes: 19529, 19530, 19534
- Area codes: 610 and 484
- FIPS code: 42-011-31352
- Website: http://www.greenwichtownshippa.org/

Greenwich Township is a township in Berks County, Pennsylvania, United States. The population was 3,438 at the 2020 census.

== History ==
The Dreibelbis Station Bridge, Kutz Mill, Kutz's Mill Bridge, Merkel Mill, and Stein Mill are listed on the National Register of Historic Places.

== Geography ==
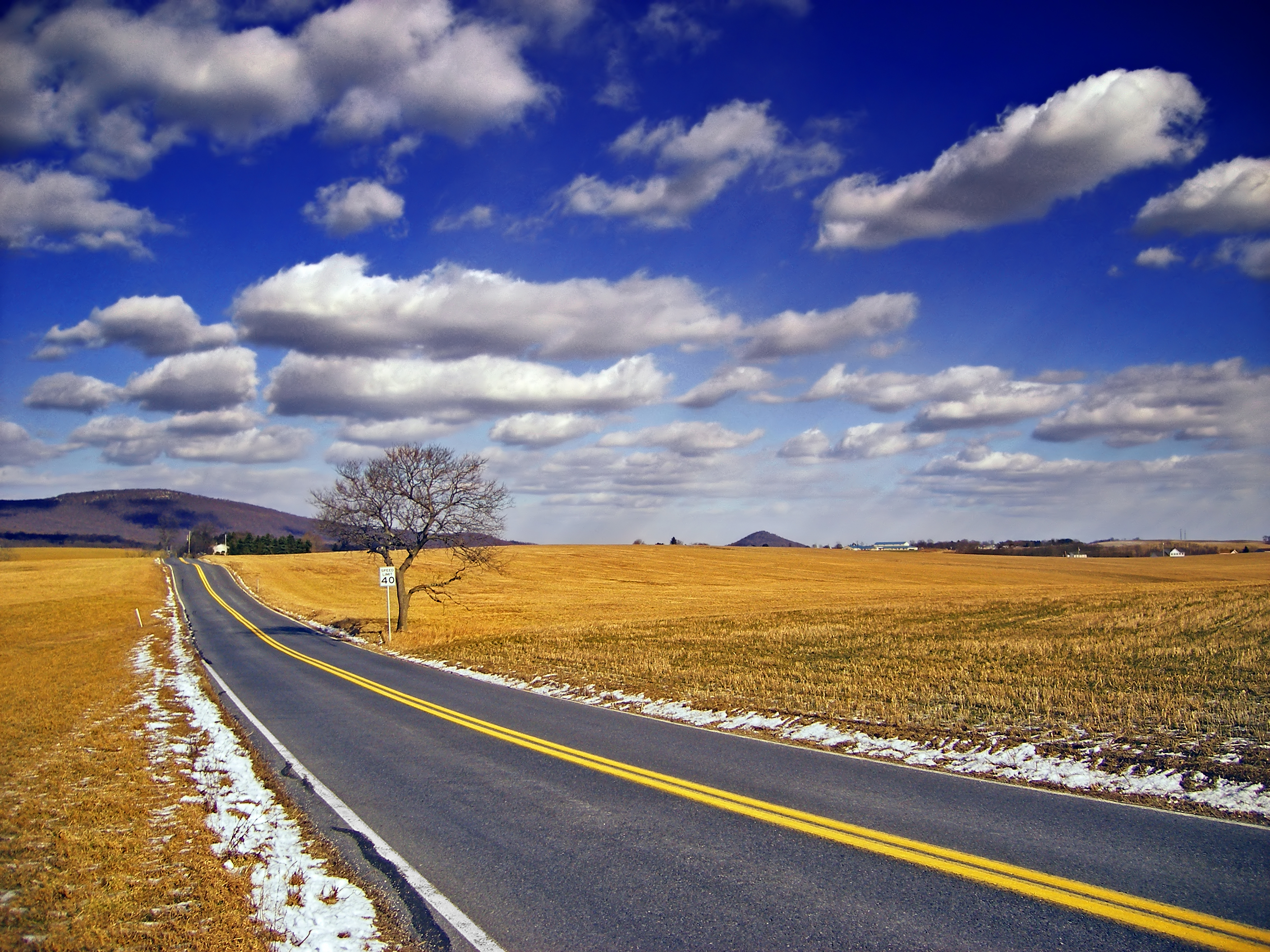
A wintry day in Greenwich Township

According to the U.S. Census Bureau, the township has a total area of 31.3 square miles (81 km^{2}), all of which is land. It is drained by the Maiden Creek into the Schuylkill River. The township's villages include Dreibelbis (also in Windsor Township), Grimville, Klinesville, and Krumsville.

Greenwich Township has a humid continental climate (Dfa/Dfb) and the hardiness zones are 6a and 6b. The average monthly temperatures in Krumsville range from 29.0 °F in January to 71.9 °F in July.

=== Adjacent municipalities ===
- Albany Township (north)
- Windsor Township (west)
- Perry Township (southwest)
- Richmond Township (south)
- Maxatawny Township (southeast)
- Weisenberg Township, Lehigh County (east)

The borough of Lenhartsville is surrounded by Greenwich Township.

== Demographics ==
Historical population
Census	Pop.	Note	%±
1980	2,432		—
1990	2,977		22.4%
2000	3,386		13.7%
2010	3,725		10.0%
2020	3,438		−7.7%
2021 (est.)	3,431		−0.2%
Source: US Census Bureau

At the 2000 census there were 3,386 people, 1,245 households, and 957 families living in the township. The population density was 108.3 inhabitants per square mile (41.8/km^{2}). There were 1,330 housing units at an average density of 42.5 per square mile (16.4/km^{2}). The racial makeup of the township was 98.49% White, 0.35% African American, 0.24% Native American, 0.15% Asian, 0.06% from other races, and 0.71% from two or more races. Hispanic or Latino of any race were 0.68%.

There were 1,245 households, 35.6% had children under the age of 18 living with them, 66.1% were married couples living together, 5.8% had a female householder with no husband present, and 23.1% were non-families. 16.1% of households were made up of individuals, and 4.7% were one person aged 65 or older. The average household size was 2.72 and the average family size was 3.06.

The age distribution was 26.1% under the age of 18, 7.6% from 18 to 24, 30.8% from 25 to 44, 26.3% from 45 to 64, and 9.2% 65 or older. The median age was 38 years. For every 100 females, there were 104.8 males. For every 100 females age 18 and over, there were 103.7 males.

The median household income was $51,250 and the median family income was $55,703. Males had a median income of $36,352 versus $27,278 for females. The per capita income for the township was $23,332. About 2.7% of families and 4.1% of the population were below the poverty line, including 4.5% of those under age 18 and 1.9% of those age 65 or over.

== Recreation ==
The Appalachian National Scenic Trail passes through the northwest corner of the township and most of the Pennsylvania State Game Lands Number 182 is located near the southwest corner.

== Transportation ==
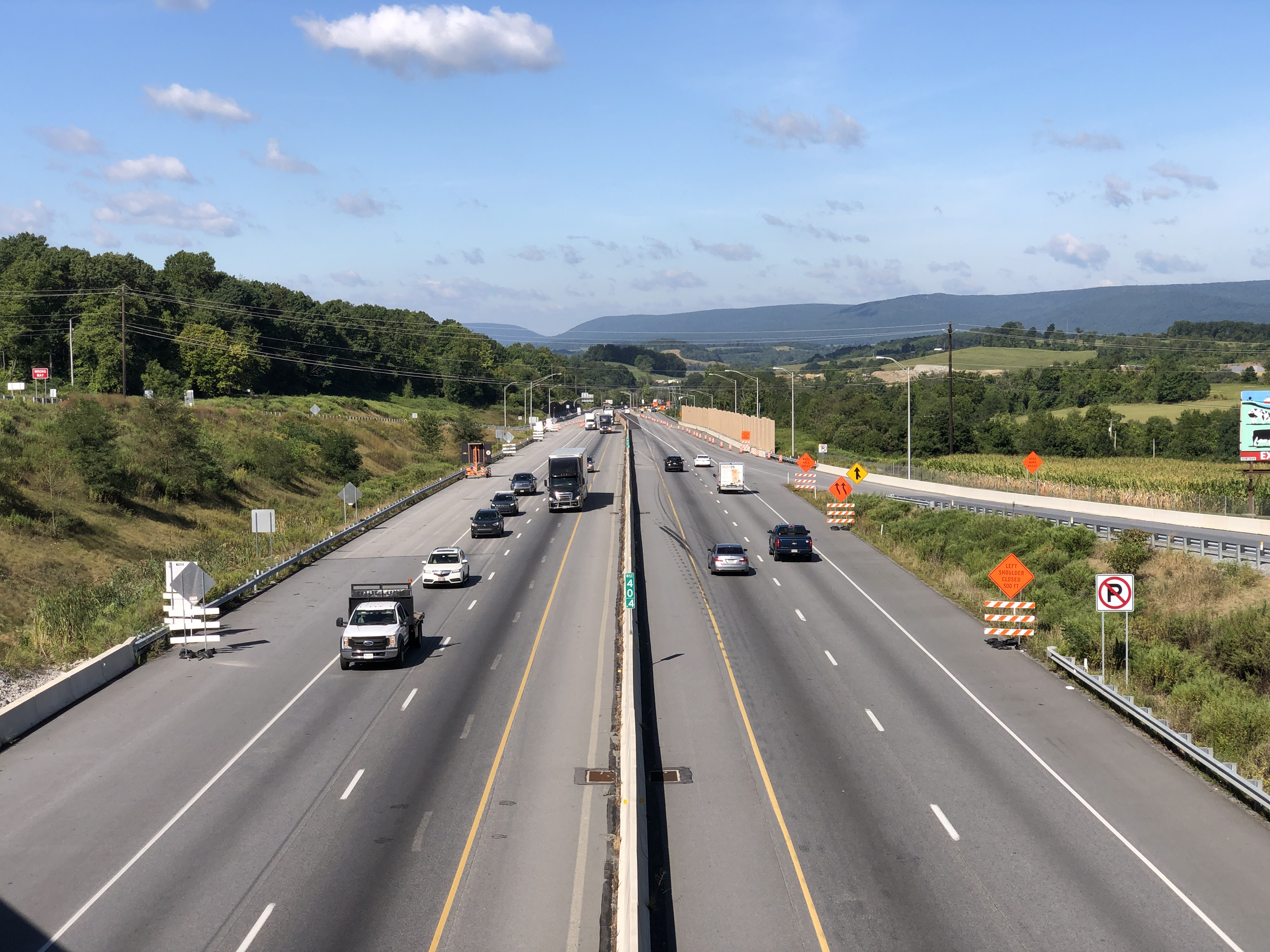
I-78/US 22 westbound in Greenwich Township

As of 2019, there were 113.48 miles (182.63 km) of public roads in Greenwich Township, of which 34.01 miles (54.73 km) were maintained by the Pennsylvania Department of Transportation (PennDOT) and 79.47 miles (127.89 km) were maintained by the township.

The main highway serving Greenwich is Interstate 78/U.S. Route 22, which follows an east–west alignment through the length of the township. I-78/US 22 has interchanges with north-to-south Pennsylvania Route 143 and Pennsylvania Route 737 in the township.

== Pronunciation ==
In Berks County and other adjacent counties of Pennsylvania, the word "Greenwich" is pronounced /ˈɡriːnwɪtʃ/ GREEN-witch rather than the more common /ˈɡrɛnɪtʃ/ GREN-itch. This anomaly in pronunciation often leads to confusion with natives of Greenwich, London, New York City, and other areas containing a Greenwich Township, such as Huron County, Ohio.
