= Maiden Creek =

Tributary of the Schuylkill River in Berks County, Pennsylvania

Coordinates: 40°25′24″N 75°56′57″W

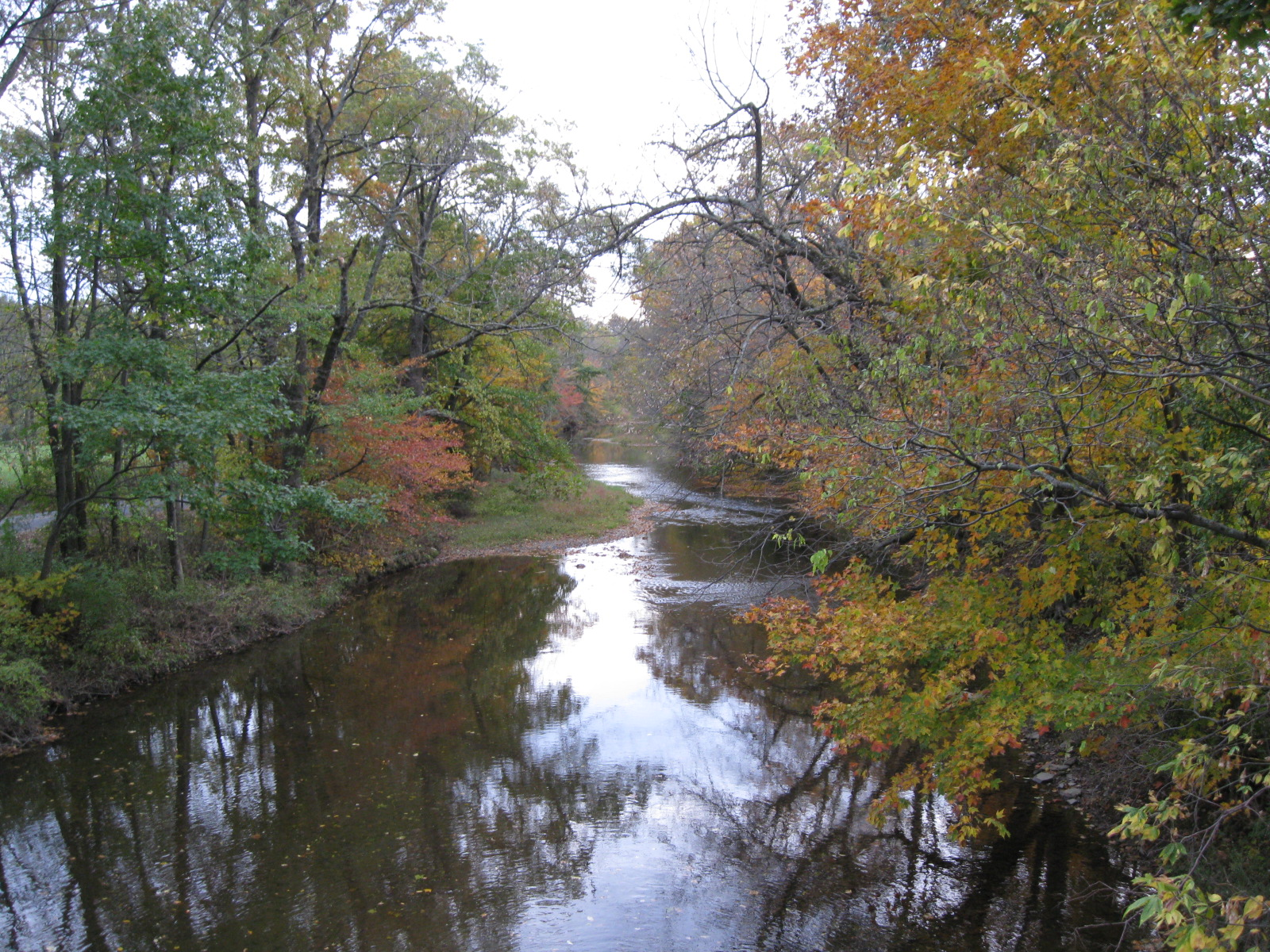
Maiden Creek in Trexler, Pennsylvania in October 2009

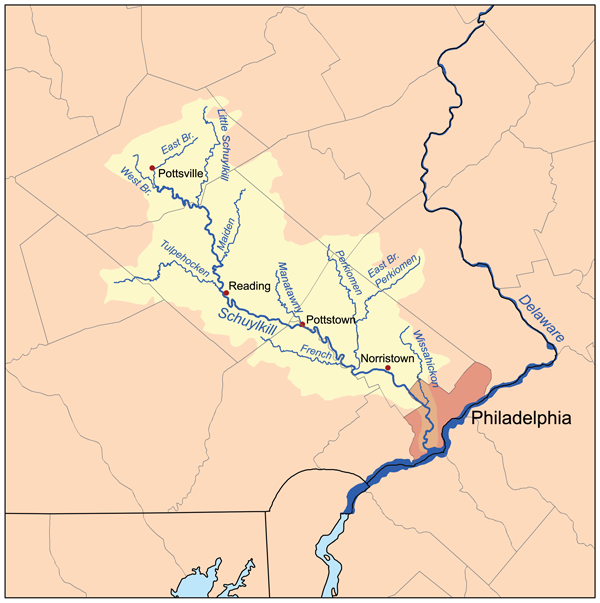
Maiden Creek joins the Schuylkill River north of Reading.

Maiden Creek is a 20.3-mile-long (32.7 km) tributary of the Schuylkill River in Berks County, Pennsylvania. The name "Maiden" is an English translation of the Native American word Ontelaunee. Maiden Creek is formed by the confluence of Ontelaunee and Kistler creeks in the community of Kempton. The tributary Sacony Creek joins at the community of Virginville.

The creek was dammed in 1926 to form Lake Ontelaunee. The creek joins the Schuylkill River north of the city of Reading, for which it serves as the main drinking water supply.

== Buildings and structures ==
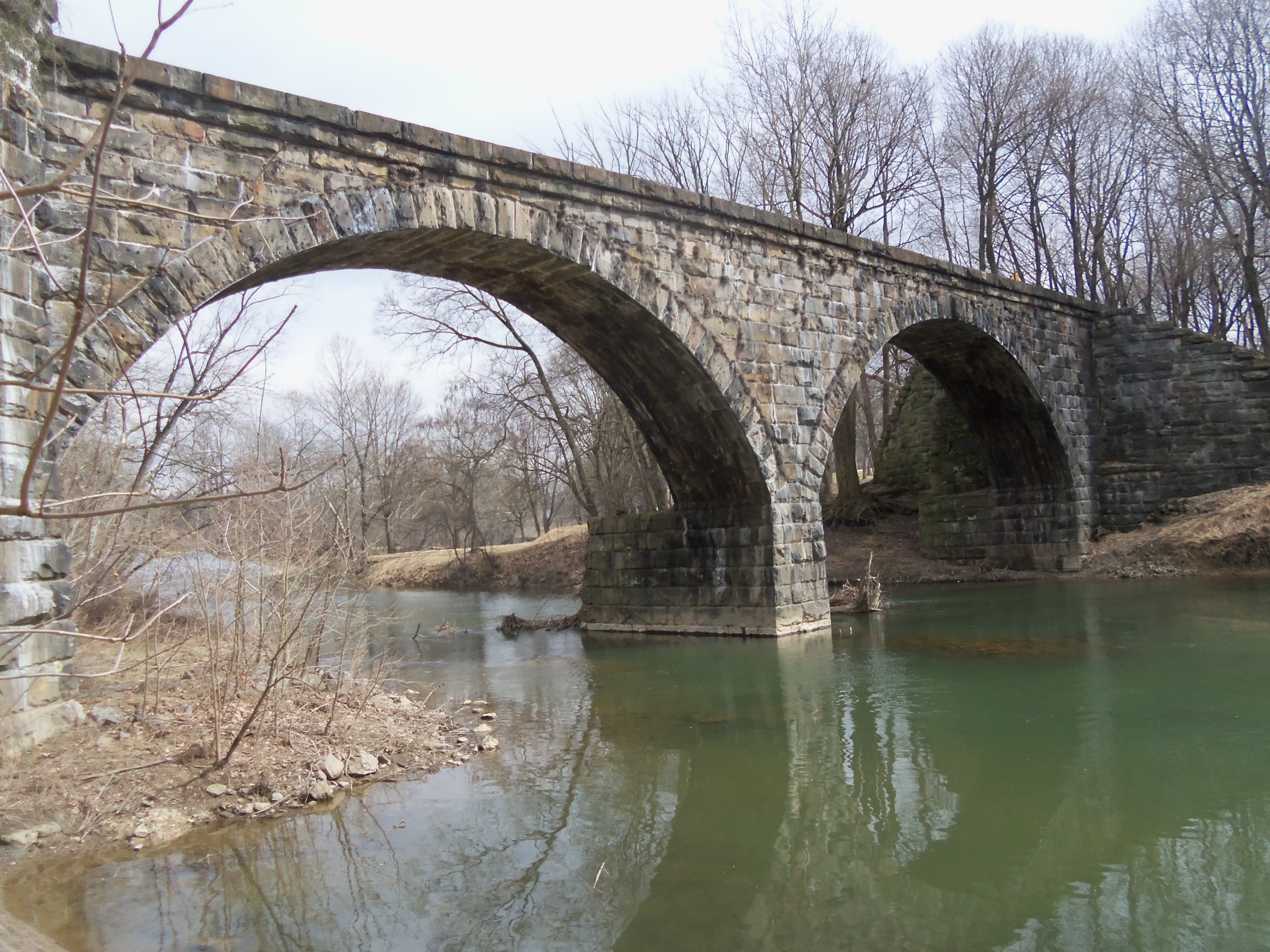
The railroad bridge next to the Schuylkill River

- Merkel Mill is located on Maiden Creek in Greenwich Township, Pennsylvania
- Bridge in Albany Township crosses Maiden Creek at Trexler
- A railroad bridge crosses Maiden Creek just before it empties into the Schuylkill River

== Watershed ==
The Maiden Creek watershed covers approximately 216 square miles (560 km^{2}) with more than 2,100 miles (3,400 km) of perennial streams, including Maiden/Ontelaunee Creek and ten named tributaries (Kistler Creek, Stony Run, Pine Creek, Furnace Creek, Mill Creek, Sacony Creek, Peters Creek, Baileys Creek, Willow Creek, Moselem Springs). The watershed is in the southeast portion of Pennsylvania, lying within the upper Schuylkill River Basin in northeastern Berks County and extreme western Lehigh County. Small portions of eastern Schuylkill County lie within the watershed at the ridgeline of Blue Mountain and in State Gamelands. Nineteen townships and five boroughs, or parts thereof, lie within the watershed. The boroughs of Kutztown, Fleetwood, Lenhartsville and Lyons, along with Greenwich, Maidencreek and Richmond townships lie entirely within the watershed. Nearly all of Albany, Lynn, Maxatawny, and Windsor townships are within the watershed as well.

There are five protected use designations awarded to streams that support the maintenance and propagation of fish species and suitable habitat for flora and fauna. The two highest designations, High Quality (HQ) and Exceptional Value (EV) mandate special water quality protection, as they embody outstanding ecological resources that are required to be maintained at existing quality. The Maiden Creek and its tributaries have achieved high rankings for water quality. Peters Creek and the source waters of Saucony Creek are classified Exceptional Value (EV), the highest designation, reserved for the most pristine waters in the state. The upper portion of Pine Creek and Bailey Creek are listed as High Quality – Cold Water Fisheries (HQ-CWF). Ontelaunee Creek and the lower section of Pine Creek are rated Cold Water Fisheries (CWF), which support trout and native flora and fauna in a cold-water habitat. Upper Maiden Creek and a majority of its tributaries are rated Trout Stocked Fishery (TSF), supporting the maintenance of stocked trout from February 15 to July 31. Lower Maiden Creek and Lake Ontelaunee support the propagation of fish species, flora and fauna that are indigenous to a Warm Waters Fishery.

The 2,100-mile (3,400 km) Appalachian Trail, running from Maine to Georgia, parallels the northern border of the watershed in Albany, Greenwich, and Windsor townships. This is a nationally significant recreational resource that attracts thousands of users each year. The trail follows the crest of Blue Mountain from the north and dips down into both the Pine and Furnace Creek subbasins before exiting the watershed to the west. Several side trails provide access to Hawk Mountain Sanctuary, Blue Rocks and the Pinnacle, three regionally important recreational features.

The 3-million-acre (12,000 km^{2}) Federal Highland Conservation area is another nationally significant area stretching from Connecticut through Pennsylvania providing a green buffer for the metropolis areas of Hartford, New York City and Philadelphia. Saucony Creek originates from the Oley Hills portion of the Pennsylvania section of the Highlands. Saucony Creek is 17.5 miles (28.2 km) in length with a section of the stream having been designated as Exceptional Value by the PA DEP. Saucony Creek is the drinking water source for the Borough of Kutztown and a tributary to the City of Reading's drinking water supply. Saucony Creek and Saucony Marsh are listed as high priority sites for protection in the Berks County Open Space & Recreation Plan, the Maiden Creek Watershed Conservation Plan, the Kutztown/Lyons/Maxatawny draft Joint Comprehensive Plan, the Kutztown Comprehensive, Recreation & Parks Plan and the Berks County Comprehensive Plan. The Saucony Creek corridor is listed in the Berks County Natural Areas Inventory as a high priority site for protection.

== See also ==
- List of rivers of Pennsylvania
