= Kutz Mill =

- U.S. National Register of Historic Places
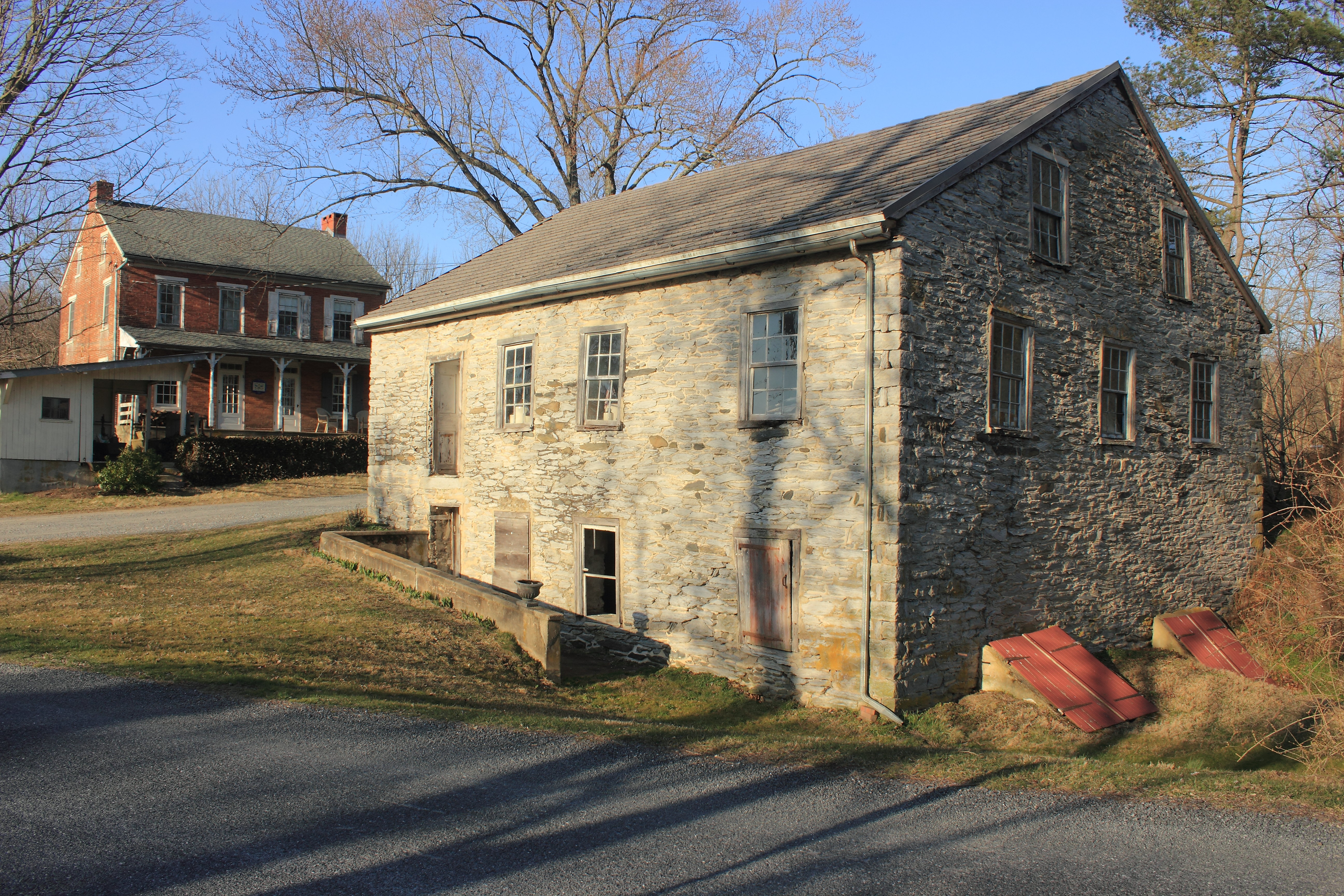
- Kutz Mill, April 2013

- Location within Pennsylvania Location within the United States
- Location: Kutz Mill Road at Sacony Creek, Greenwich Township, Pennsylvania
- Coordinates: 40°32′03″N 75°48′20″W
- Area: 2 acres (0.81 ha)
- Built: c. 1850
- MPS: Gristmills in Berks County MPS
- NRHP reference No.: 90001622
- Added to NRHP: November 8, 1990

The Kutz Mill is an historic grist mill complex that is located next to Sacony Creek in Greenwich Township, Berks County, Pennsylvania, United States.

It was listed on the National Register of Historic Places in 1990.

== History and architectural features ==
Adjacent to the Kutz's Mill Bridge, the complex includes the one-and-one-half-story, stone mill (c. 1850), the brick farmhouse (1855), a one-and-one-half-story, stone, summer kitchen, a stone and frame Pennsylvania German bank barn, and three frame outbuildings. The mill is representative of a country custom mill and was built as part of a working farm.

It was listed on the National Register of Historic Places in 1990.
