= Dreibelbis, Pennsylvania =

Unincorporated community in Pennsylvania, US

- Unincorporated community
- Location within Pennsylvania
- Coordinates: 40°33′17″N 75°52′46″W
- Country: United States
- State: Pennsylvania
- County: Berks
- Township: Greenwich
- Elevation: 335 ft (102 m)
- Time zone: UTC-5 (Eastern (EST))
  - Summer (DST): UTC-4 (EDT)
- Area codes: 610 and 484
- GNIS feature ID: 1203445

Dreibelbis /ˈdraɪbəlbɪs/ is an unincorporated community in Greenwich Township in Berks County, Pennsylvania, United States.
