= J. Nathan Kutz =

American mathematician

José Nathan Kutz is the Robert Bolles and Yasuko Endo Professor within the Department of Applied Mathematics at the University of Washington in Seattle. His main research interests involve non-linear waves and coherent structures (especially in fiber lasers), as well as dimensionality reduction and data-analysis techniques for complex systems.

He graduated from the University of Washington with a B.S. in 1990, and obtained his PhD in 1994 at Northwestern University, supervised by William L. Kath.

He is the author of the book Data-Driven Modeling & Scientific Computation: Methods for Complex Systems & Big Data (Oxford Univ. Press, 2013). He also delivers on a regular basis Scientific Computing and Computational Methods for Data Analysis as Massive Open Online Courses (MOOCs) in the Coursera platform.

He was elected as a Fellow of the Society for Industrial and Applied Mathematics, in the 2022 Class of SIAM Fellows, "for contributions to applied dynamical systems, machine learning, and nonlinear optics".
