= Windsor Township, Berks County, Pennsylvania =

Township in Pennsylvania, US

Windsor Township
- Township
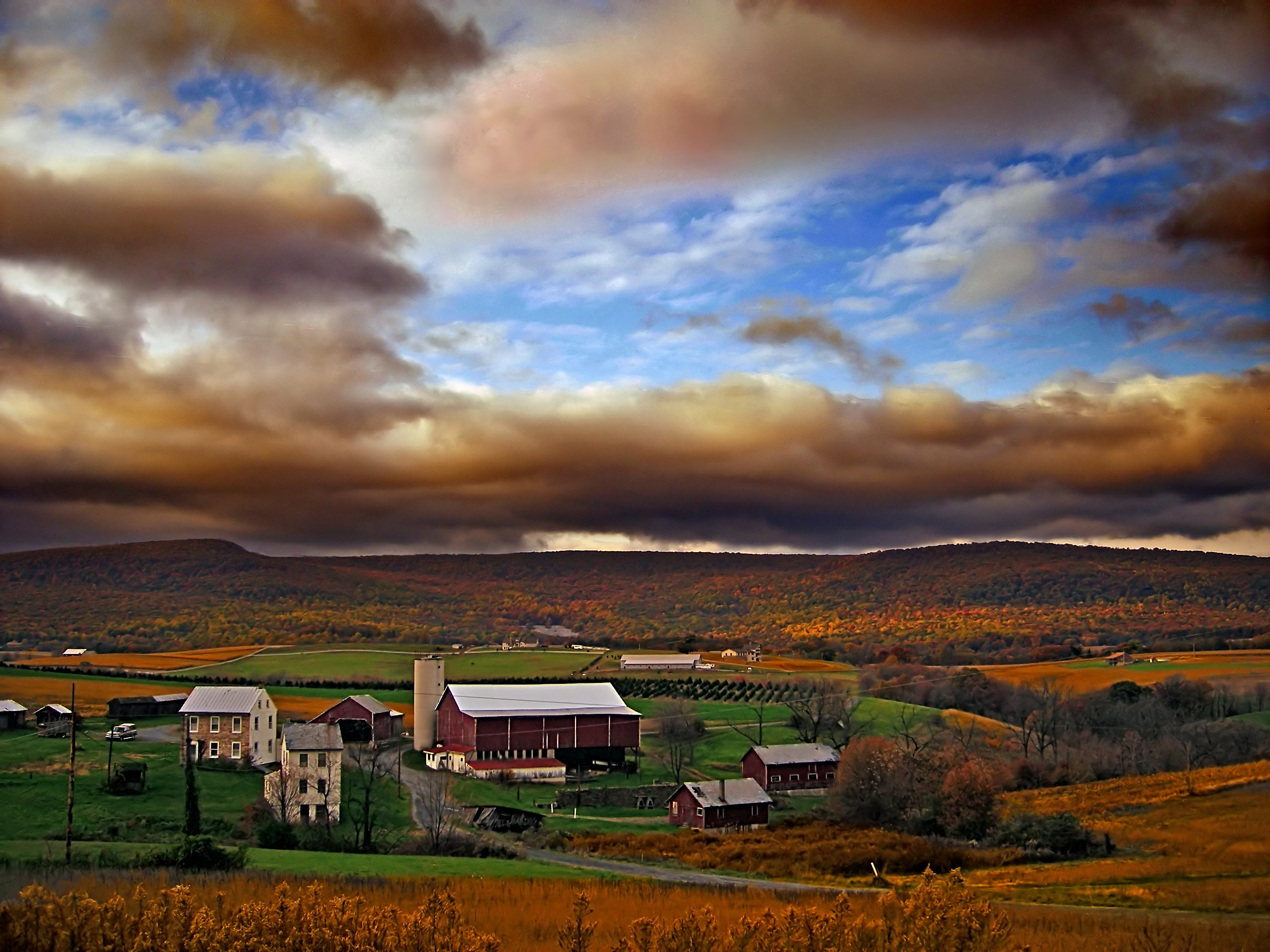
- A farm in Windsor Township in November 2007

- Location of Windsor Township in Berks County, Pennsylvania (left) and of Berks County in Pennsylvania (right)

- Location of Windsor Township in Pennsylvania Windsor Township (the United States)
- Coordinates: 40°35′00″N 76°00′29″W
- Country: United States
- State: Pennsylvania
- County: Berks
- Established: 1740

Area
  - Total: 22.6 sq mi (59 km^{2})
  - Land: 22.5 sq mi (58 km^{2})
  - Water: 0.1 sq mi (0.26 km^{2})
- Elevation: 991 ft (302 m)

Population (2010)
  - Total: 2,279
  - Estimate (2016): 2,333
  - Density: 101/sq mi (39.1/km^{2})
- Time zone: UTC-5 (EST)
  - Summer (DST): UTC-4 (EDT)
- Area code: 610
- FIPS code: 42-011-85720
- Website: https://www.windsortownshipberkscounty.com/

Windsor Township is a township in Berks County, Pennsylvania, United States. The population was 2,279 at the 2010 census.

== Geography ==
According to the U.S. Census Bureau, the township has a total area of 22.6 square miles (58.5 km^{2}), of which 22.5 square miles (58.2 km^{2}) is land and 0.1 square mile (0.3 km^{2}) (0.58%) is water. The town was drained by the Schuylkill River and its northern portion is located on Blue Mountain. The township's villages include Dreibelbis (also in Greenwich Township), Edenburg, and Windsor Castle.

Adjacent municipalities

- Albany Township (northeast)
- Greenwich Township (east)
- Perry Township (south)
- Tilden Township (west)
- Hamburg (west)
- West Brunswick Township, Schuylkill County (northwest)

== Demographics ==
As of the 2000 census, there were 2,392 people, 842 households, and 628 families living in the township. The population density was 106.5 inhabitants per square mile (41.1/km^{2}). There were 939 housing units at an average density of 41.8 per square mile (16.1/km^{2}). The racial makeup of the township was 97.95% White, 0.59% African American, 0.04% Native American, 0.13% Asian, 0.54% from other races, and 0.75% from two or more races. Hispanic or Latino of any race were 1.30%.

There were 842 households, 30.4% had children under the age of 18 living with them, 64.6% were married couples living together, 6.1% had a female householder with no husband present, and 25.4% were non-families. 20.9% of households were made up of individuals, and 9.9% were one person aged 65 or older. The average household size was 2.57 and the average family size was 2.95.

The age distribution was 20.6% under the age of 18, 6.4% from 18 to 24, 31.5% from 25 to 44, 28.1% from 45 to 64, and 13.5% 65 or older. The median age was 41 years. For every 100 females, there were 101.3 males. For every 100 females age 18 and over, there were 100.8 males.

Historical population
Census	Pop.	Note	%±
1980	2,199		—
1990	2,101		−4.5%
2000	2,392		13.9%
2010	2,279		−4.7%
2016 (est.)	2,333		2.4%
Source: US Census Bureau

The median household income was $49,402 and the median family income was $56,800. Males had a median income of $36,379 versus $25,893 for females. The per capita income for the township was $19,259. About 5.4% of families and 6.7% of the population were below the poverty line, including 5.6% of those under age 18 and 7.3% of those age 65 or over.

== Recreation ==
The Appalachian National Scenic Trail passes through the township, and the portions of the Pennsylvania State Game Lands Number 106 is located in the northern part. Kaercher Creek Park is located adjacent to Hamburg.

== Transportation ==
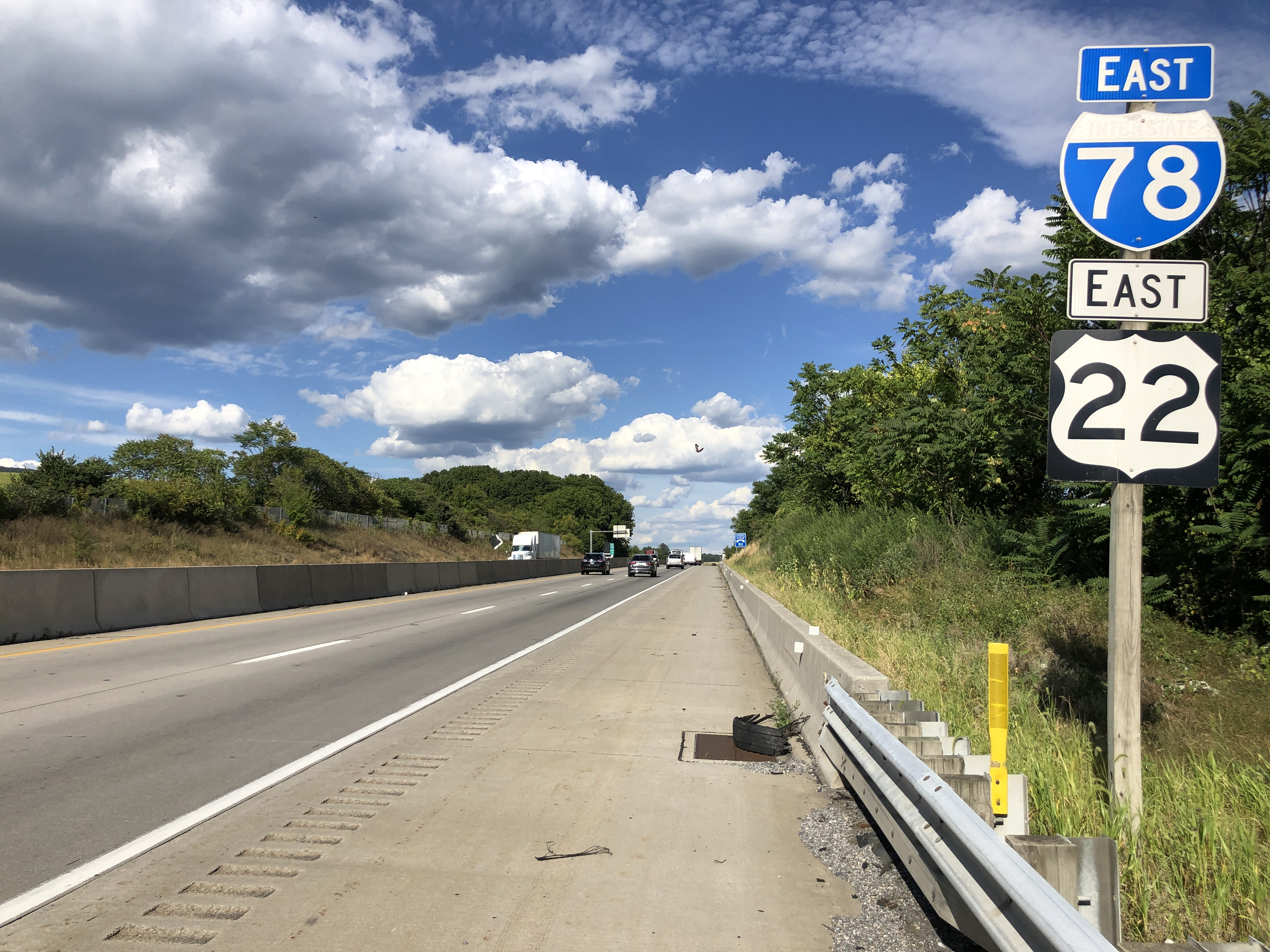
I-78/US 22 eastbound in Windsor Township

As of 2011, there were 53.29 miles (85.76 km) of public roads in Windsor Township, of which 16.50 miles (26.55 km) were maintained by the Pennsylvania Department of Transportation (PennDOT) and 36.79 miles (59.21 km) were maintained by the town itself.

Interstate 78 and U.S. Route 22 pass through the area concurrently along William Penn Highway. It follows a southwest–northeast alignment through the middle of the township, but the nearest exits are in neighboring Hamburg and Greenwich Township. Pennsylvania Route 61 follows Pottsville Pike along a north–south alignment across the southwestern corner of the township. Moreover, Pennsylvania Route 143 follows Dreibelbis Road along a north–south alignment across the southeastern corner of the township.
