= Christian Mertel =

American painter

Christian Mertel (1739–1802) was an American fraktur artist.

A native of Herborn, Mertel was the son of John Jacob and Elizabeth Mertel. He immigrated to the Thirteen Colonies in 1773 aboard the Crawford; a fellow passenger was John Contrad Trevitz, who would also go on to become a teacher and fraktur artist. Mertel followed his father's profession, becoming a dyer of indigo cloth. By 1793 he had acquired land in Conewago Township, Dauphin County; during this period he began to produce fraktur, primarily for his neighbors. He taught school, most likely at the institution operated by Hoffer's Brethren Meeting; even so, he produced mainly baptismal certificates during his career. Raised in the Reformed tradition, he created work for Lutheran families as well. Mertel's paintings bear the influence of other fraktur artists, including Johann Henrich Otto and Johann Jacob Friedrich Krebs, who was a neighbor; nevertheless they are marked with the stamp of individuality, containing images of castles, fish, mermaids, lions, unicorns, the Princess of Brunswick, and flowers of many varieties. He also produced zodiacs, and sent family and other acquaintances New Year's greetings every year. He died in Conewago Township; a list of effects at his death included a box of pictures, an inkstand, and a musical instrument.

Three works by Mertel are held by the Winterthur Museum, and five are in the collection of the Philadelphia Museum of Art. In 2016, a piece of his appeared on Antiques Roadshow, where it was appraised for between $4,000 and $6,000.
