= Aaronsburg, Centre County, Pennsylvania =

Census-designated place in Pennsylvania, US

- Census-designated place
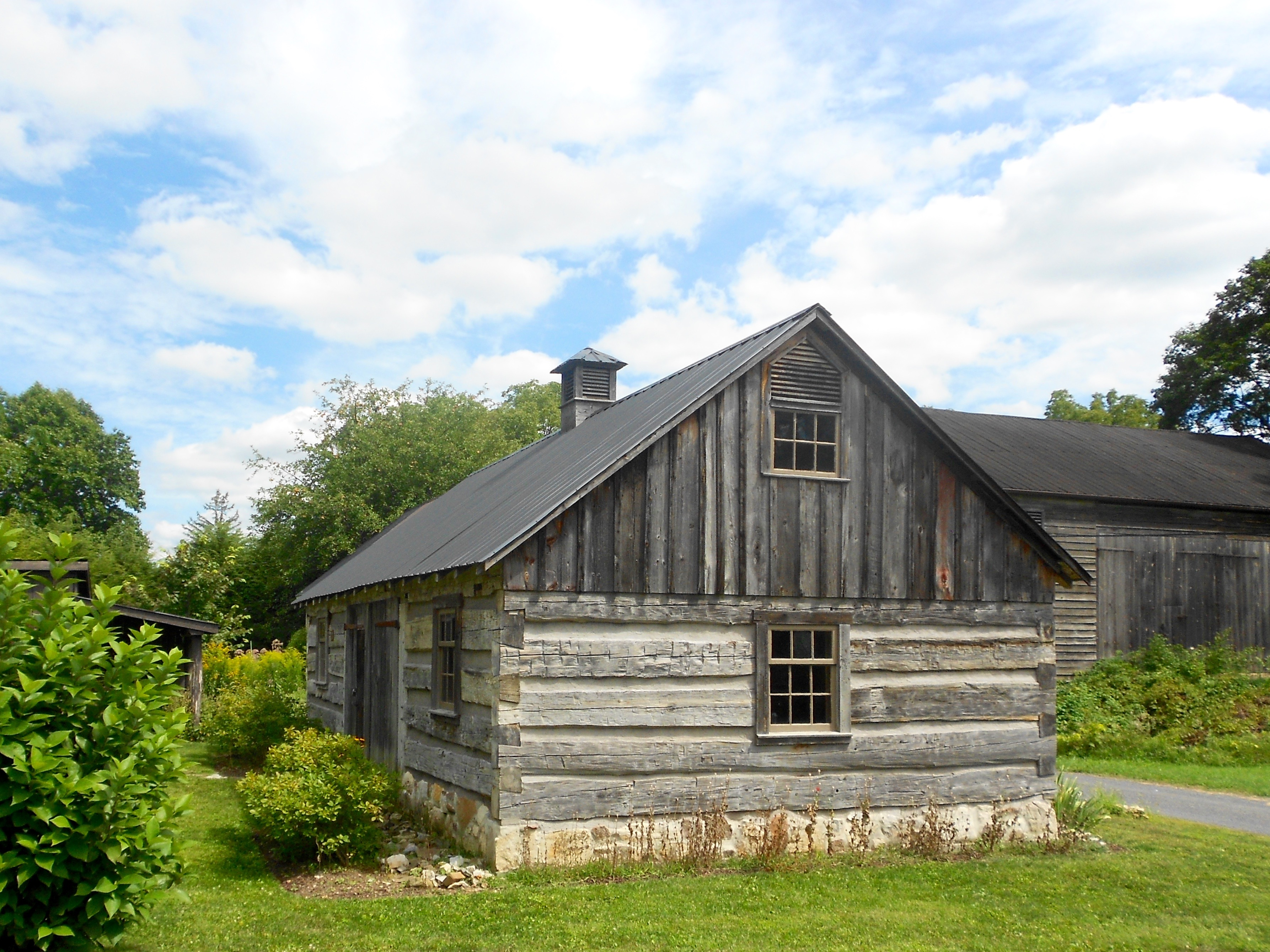
- Log house

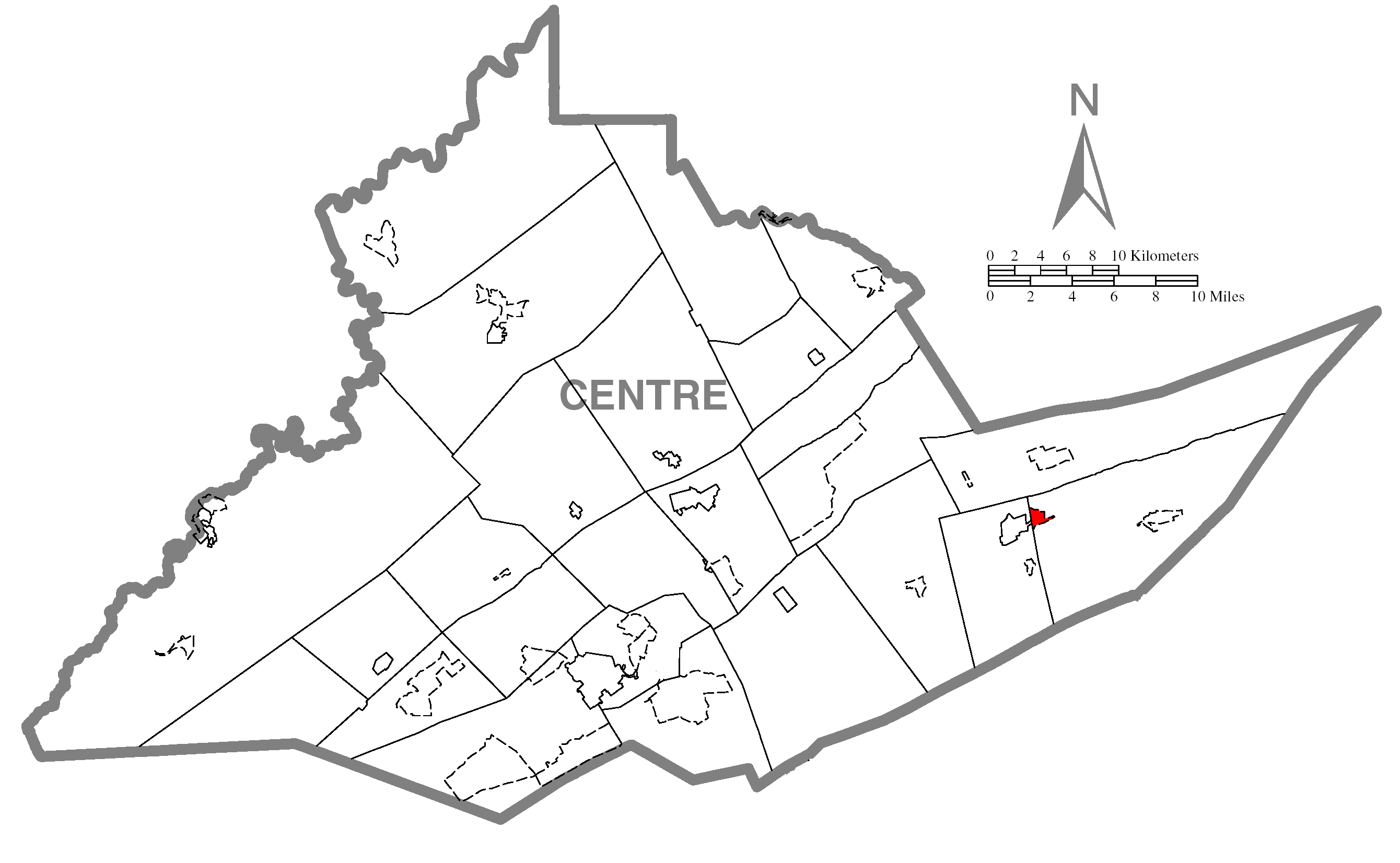
- Location of Aaronsburg in Centre County

- Location of Centre County in Pennsylvania
- Coordinates: 40°53′59″N 77°27′11″W
- Country: United States
- State: Pennsylvania
- County: Centre
- Township: Haines

Area
  - Total: 0.88 sq mi (2.29 km^{2})
  - Land: 0.88 sq mi (2.29 km^{2})
  - Water: 0 sq mi (0.00 km^{2})
- Elevation: 1,180 ft (360 m)

Population (2020)
  - Total: 593
  - Density: 669.7/sq mi (258.59/km^{2})
- Time zone: UTC-5 (Eastern (EST))
  - Summer (DST): UTC-4 (EDT)
- ZIP code: 16820
- FIPS code: 42-00100
- GNIS feature ID: 1168362

Aaronsburg is a census-designated place (CDP) in Centre County, Pennsylvania, United States. It is part of the State College, Pennsylvania Metropolitan Statistical Area. The population was 613 at the 2010 census.

== History ==
Aaronsburg was founded in 1786 by Aaron Levy, of which the town is named for him. It is the first town in Pennsylvania (and possibly in the United States) laid out by and named after a Jew. He laid out the town of right in the geographic center of the state, with hopes of it becoming a major settlement. Its orderly planned and aligned streets were designed that the town might one day be the county seat. This, however, never occurred due to the lack of water. The current county seat is Bellefonte.

Levy was a prominent Jewish merchant who immigrated to Pennsylvania from Amsterdam sometime between 1760 and 1770 to trade with the native peoples and furnished supplies to the proprietary government. After Treaty of Fort Stanwix was signed in 1768, he went west in the land rush and settled at the west branches of the Susquehanna River. There he opened a store to buy and sell to local farmers and native peoples.

During the American Revolutionary War, he moved back to Lancaster. As a creditor, Levy was a major financier of the Continental Congress during the conflict, with his loans never fully being repaid.

In June 1779, Levy bought a tract of 334 acres in Center County known as the Alexander Grant warranty. Upon this he laid out and planned what would become Aaronsburg. A plot of ground named Aaron's Square was reserved by the founder for public uses, and one of the streets was named Rachel's Way in honor of his wife. On November 16, 1789, Levy gave to the trustees of the Salem Evangelical Church a lot upon which to erect a church and schoolhouse.

In 1949 a pageant was held to celebrate Aaronsburg's unique history and namesake. Aaron Levy, a Jewish merchant from Philadelphia, presented members of Salem Lutheran Church with a pewter communion set as a gift. This unusual gesture inspired many, and 50,000 people descended upon Aaronsburg to commemorate it. Attendees included Ralph Bunche, Cornel Wilde, and, later, Ronald Reagan. A short film and a book "The Aaronsburg Story" by Arthur H. Lewis were written about this event, published in 1955.

The Aaronsburg Historic District was added to the National Register of Historic Places in 1980.

== Geography ==
Aaronsburg is located in eastern Centre County, in the northwest corner of Haines Township. It is bordered on the west by the borough of Millheim. It sits in the Penns Valley at the southern base of Shriner Mountain. Pennsylvania Route 45 passes through the town, leading west into Millheim and then on to State College, and east to Lewisburg on the Susquehanna River.

According to the United States Census Bureau, the Aaronsburg CDP has a total area of 0.888 square miles (2.30 km^{2}), all land.

== Demographics ==
Historical population
Census	Pop.	Note	%±
2000	485		—
2010	613		26.4%
2020	593		−3.3%
U.S. Decennial Census

=== 2010 ===
As of the 2010 US census, there were 613 people, 240 households, and 175 families living in the CDP. The racial makeup of the CDP was 99.3% White, 0.2% Native American, with 0.3% from two or more races. Hispanic or Latino of any race were 0.5% of the population. The population density in 2000 was 931.1 people per square mile (360.1/km^{2}).

There were 257 housing units, and 240 households, 28.3% had children under the age of 18 living with them, 59.6% were married couples living together, 5.0% had a male householder with no wife present, 8.3% had a female householder with no husband present, and 27.1% were non-families. 29.6% of households were one person under 18, and 30.4% were one person aged 65 or older. The average household size was 2.55 and the average family size was 3.02.

The age distribution was 24.1% under the age of 18, 5.4% from 20 to 24, 25 from 25 to 44, 27% from 45 to 64, and 16.6% 65 or older. The median age was 40.9 years. For every 100 females there were 105 males.

=== 2000 census ===
At the 2000 census there were 485 people, 201 households, and 146 families living in the CDP. The population density was 931.1 inhabitants per square mile (359.5/km^{2}). There were 209 housing units at an average density of 401.2 per square mile (154.9/km^{2}). The racial makeup of the CDP was 99.59% White, 0.21% Native American, and 0.21% from two or more races. Hispanic or Latino of any race were 0.82%.

There were 201 households, 27.4% had children under the age of 18 living with them, 60.7% were married couples living together, 9.0% had a female householder with no husband present, and 26.9% were non-families. 22.9% of households were made up of individuals, and 10.0% were one person aged 65 or older. The average household size was 2.41 and the average family size was 2.82.

The age distribution was 22.5% under the age of 18, 5.6% from 18 to 24, 30.3% from 25 to 44, 23.3% from 45 to 64, and 18.4% 65 or older. The median age was 40 years. For every 100 females there were 101.2 males. For every 100 females age 18 and over, there were 91.8 males.

The median household income was $40,833 and the median family income was $41,667. Males had a median income of $30,938 versus $28,036 for females. The per capita income for the CDP was $21,011. About 3.2% of families and 3.8% of the population were below the poverty line, including none of those under age 18 and 10.0% of those age 65 or over.

== Notable people ==
- Daniel Otto, fraktur artist
- John H. Stover, (1833–1889), born in Aaronsburg, United States Congressman from Missouri.
