= Anna Weber =

Canadian artist (1814–1888)

- Born: 1814; Earl Township, Lancaster County, Pennsylvania
- Died: 1888 (aged 73–74); Waterloo County, Ontario
- Known for: Fraktur

Anna Weber (1814–1888) was a Canadian Mennonite Fraktur artist.

== Life ==
Weber was born June 3, 1814, in Earl Township, Lancaster County, Pennsylvania, to a Mennonite family of Swiss descent. She was the fifth of ten children born to Johannes Weber and Catherine Gehman. Though she was more widely known as Anna, she was also sometimes called "Nance" and she is recorded as "Nancy Weber" in "A Biographical History of Waterloo Region" by Ezra E. Eby.

In 1721, Anna's great-great-grandfather, Henry ("Heiner") Weber, emigrated to America from Switzerland and purchased about 3,000 acres of land in the Conestoga River valley in Pennsylvania. This area, now known as Weaverland, is where Anna and her parents and grandparents were born and where Anna first attended parochial school. Her father, John Weaver, was ordained a deacon in the Weaverland Mennonite Church in 1820. In April 1825, Anna's family migrated to Woolwich Township in what is now Waterloo Region, Ontario, Canada. As first settlers in the newly opened township, Weber's family had to clear the land before they could begin farming. In 1833, Anna's father was ordained minister to the congregation of the new Martin's Mennonite Meeting House, a mile or two west of their farm.

Weber was noted for her strangeness, difficulty, and rebellious nature by those who knew her. She never married and continued to live in her parents' home until her mother died in 1864, when Anna was 50 years old (her father had died 10 years earlier). In the 24 years after her mother's death, Anna lived with at least eight different Mennonite families in the area, most for only a year or two.

In the mid-1860s, Anna suffered from dropsy, causing her legs and feet to swell so much that she could not get around without assistance, but she seems to have recovered. In 1886, she probably suffered a stroke; after that, she was paralyzed, crippled, and in a lot of pain. In the last few years of her life, she was bed-ridden, but continued to draw and paint while lying on her back, holding her quill pen in crippled fingers. In those years, Anna was taking medicine for her pain and to help her sleep. It appears that she accidentally took the wrong medication or the wrong dosage of one of her medications, and she died in her sleep October 2, 1888.

== Art ==
As a young person, she learned the traditional art of needlework and produced decorative embroidered samplers and show towels. She also produced stuffed animals and hooked mats. She was likely introduced to Fraktur at an early age. In the early 19th century, Fraktur art was commonly found in many areas of Pennsylvania. Several pieces have been retained by family members dating as far back as 1784, including an illuminated Spiritual Labrynth by the renowned Pennsylvanian artist Heinrich Otto. In addition, Fraktur hand was customarily taught in local Mennonite primary schools. The local Fraktur art style, known as the Earl Township school, is characterized by the use of a two-headed bird motif and took the form of Vorschriften, gaudily decorated calligraphy inscribed in Gothic German script. The local schoolmaster at this time, Mr. Altsdorf, was reported to produce very beautiful works of Vorschriften.

By the age of 40, Weber began working with the Fraktur motifs for which she became known. One of her earliest documented art is illustrations she added to her songbook in 1866. Most of her work through the 1870s and 1880s were gifts for birthdays and special occasions. While traditional Fraktur focuses on text with some decorative embellishment, Weber's work is characterized by "imaginitive visual expression". She filled the page with depictions of birds, animals and flowers with only a dedication, signature and date inscribed below. Her artwork was heavily influenced by Mennonite themes such as the Tree of Life. According to the Dictionary of Canadian Biography, Weber was "the most original and prolific of Ontario's fraktur [sic] artists", which was particularly notable given the paucity of female Fraktur artists.
