= Zierenberg =

- Town
- Coat of arms

- Location of Zierenberg within Kassel district
- Interactive map of Zierenberg
- Location within Germany Location within Hesse
- Coordinates: 51°19′N 09°10′E
- Country: Germany
- State: Hesse
- Admin. region: Kassel
- District: Kassel

Government
  - Mayor (2020–26): Rüdiger Gemeroth (SPD)

Area
  - Total: 86.55 km^{2} (33.42 sq mi)
- Elevation: 279 m (915 ft)

Population (2025-12-31)
  - Total: 6,155
  - Density: 71.11/km^{2} (184.2/sq mi)
- Time zone: UTC+01:00 (CET)
  - Summer (DST): UTC+02:00 (CEST)
- Postal codes: 34289
- Dialling codes: 05606
- Vehicle registration: KS
- Website: www.stadt-zierenberg.de

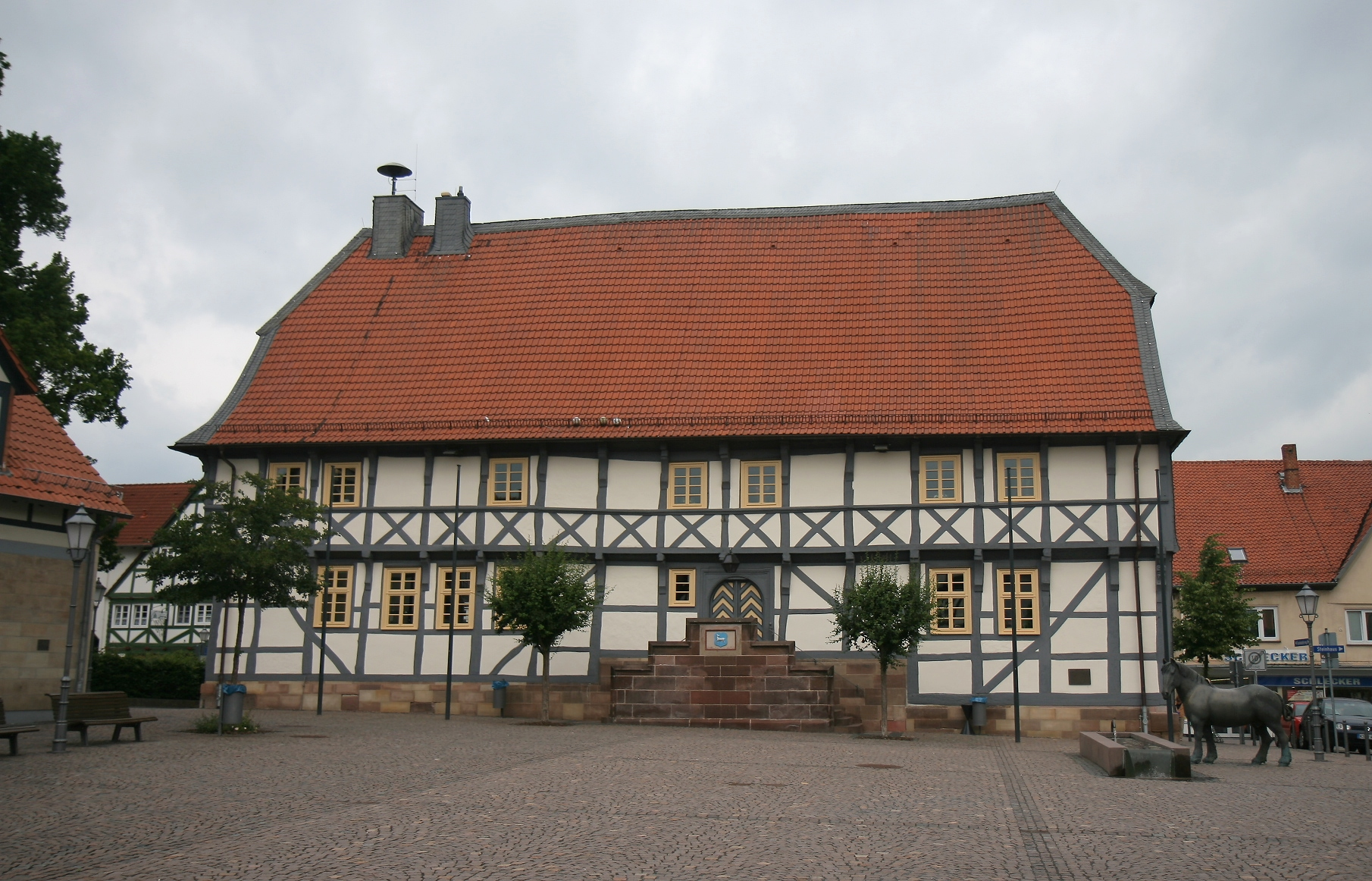
Zierenberg town hall

Zierenberg (German pronunciation: [ˈtsiːʁənˌbɛʁk]) is a town in the district of Kassel, in Hesse, Germany. It is located 19 km east of Bad Arolsen, and 15 km northwest of Kassel on the German Timber-Frame Road.

== Local council ==
The elections from 06. March 2016 showed the following results:

- CDU = 8 seats
- SPD = 14 seats
- FDP = 2 seats
- UFW = 7 seats

== Mayors ==
- Conrad Brede: 1856–1880
- Karl Kupferschläger: 1880–1911
- Wiegand Pitz: 1912–1933
- Wilhelm Schäfer: 1933–1945
- Heinrich Ledderhose: 1945–1948
- Konrad Bürgel: 1948–1956
- Rudi Walther: 1957–1972
- Georg Hildebrandt: 1972–1984
- Horst Buchhaupt: 1984–1990
- Jürgen Pfütze: 1991–2008
- Stefan Denn: 2009–2020
- since 2020: Rüdiger Gemeroth

== Notable people ==
- Johann Jacob Friedrich Krebs, fraktur painter
