= Johann Conrad Gilbert =

American painter

Johann Conrad Gilbert (1734–1812) was an American fraktur artist.

An emigrant from Germany, Gilbert ultimately settled in Berks County, Pennsylvania. By profession he was a Lutheran schoolmaster posted to several churches in Berks and Schuylkill Counties. He was married and had a large family; at his death he left his family Bible, with "writings therein", to a grandson, although this is now lost. Stylistically, Gilbert copied the work of Daniel Schumacher, borrowing also from the work of the Sussel-Washington Artist, whose own work is in turn informed by that of Johann Henrich Otto. His output consisted of baptismal records; presentation pieces, many depicting schoolmasters holding slates; religious texts; and images of the Easter rabbit, the earliest American depictions of the figure. Hallmarks of his frakturs include careful lines, deep color, and exotically dressed angels. His designs are whimsical, and appear meant for children rather than for adults.

Two examples of Gilbert's Easter rabbit paintings are in museum collections, one in the Abby Aldrich Rockefeller Folk Art Museum and the other in the Winterthur Museum.
