= Johannes Spitler =

American painter of furniture

Johannes Spitler (October 2, 1774 – April 18, 1837) was an American painter of furniture.

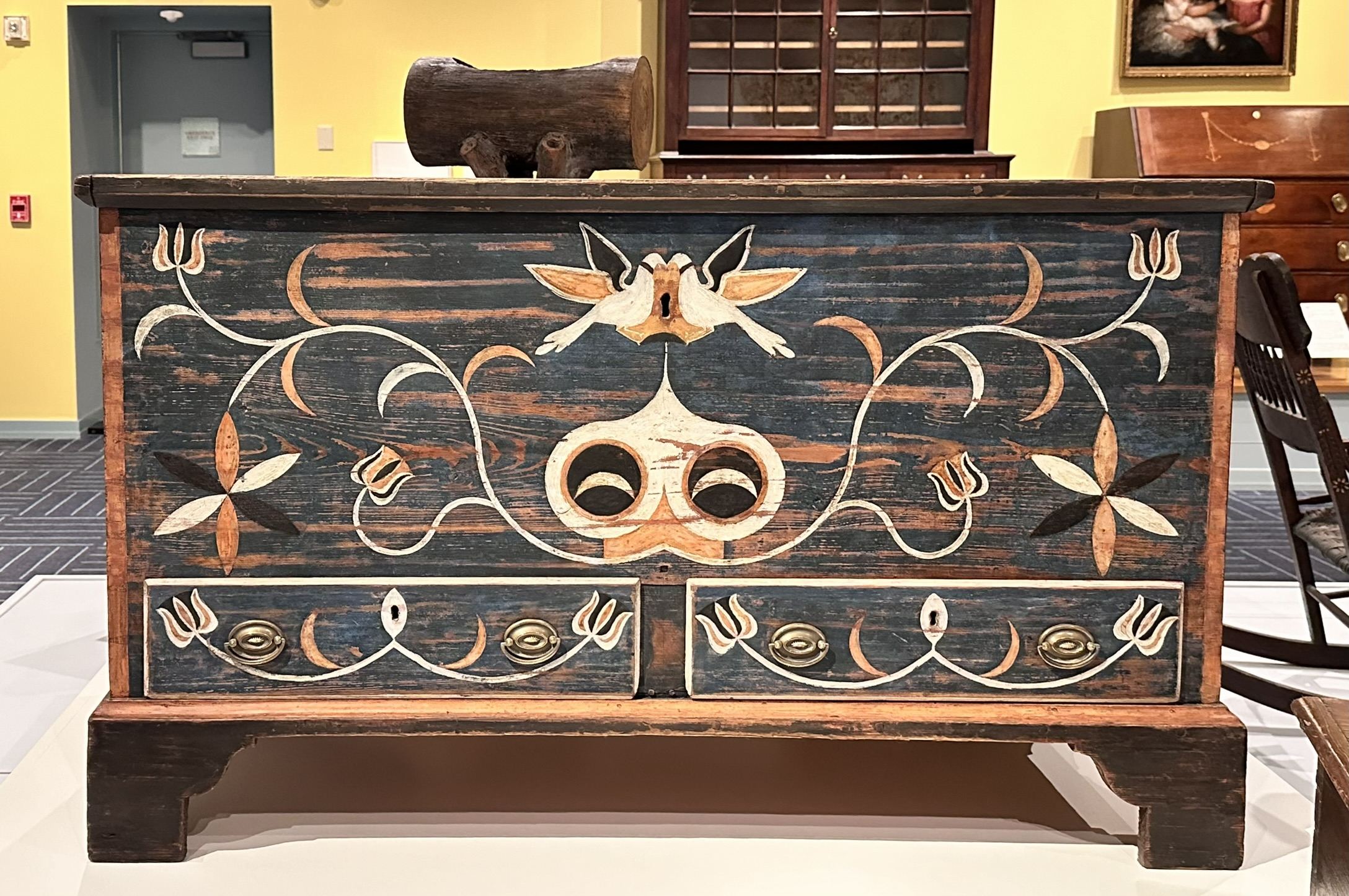
A blanket chest made between 1800-1805 and painted by Johannes Spitler, on display in the Museum of the Shenandoah Valley, Winchester, Virginia.

Little is recorded about Spitler's life, but he is known to have been born in the community of Massanutten, Virginia, in a portion of Shenandoah County which later became part of Page County. He worked from the 1790s until around 1810, by which point he had moved to Fairfield County, Ohio. His style is distinctive; historians have posited that its uniqueness was informed by the geographic and social isolation of the community in which he lived and worked. Many of his pieces were traditional, while others incorporated natural imagery in addition to abstract patterns. He used the same palette throughout his career, red, blue, white, and black. He initialed all of his work, and kept a list of his pieces, which shows that at the peak of his career he was creating nearly twenty-five works a year. The majority of pieces Spitler painted were blanket chests, many of yellow pine; whether or not he made them himself, or merely painted them, is unknown. Two tall clock cases have also been attributed to him. One of the latter bears the signature of Jacob Strickler, a neighbor and relative by marriage who was also a fraktur artist; it underlines the influence which fraktur drawings had on furniture design in the German American community. Two unsigned pieces dating to after Spitler's move to Ohio have been ascribed to him, but their date is unknown; it is not known if he continued his artistic career after moving. He died in Ohio.

Several pieces by Spitler were included in an exhibition of Virginia folk art at Colonial Williamsburg in 1973, an event which led to the identification of a body of work by Donald R. Walters. Today the Abby Aldrich Rockefeller Folk Art Museum owns a chest painted by Spitler, as well as one of the clocks. Other chests are held by the Museum of the Shenandoah Valley, the Winterthur Museum, and the Museum of Early Southern Decorative Arts. The American Folk Art Museum owns two chests and the second clock, which was a gift from Ralph Esmerian. Another chest sold at auction in 2015 for $356,500.
