= New Boston-Morea, Pennsylvania =

New Boston-Morea
- CDP
- Location within the U.S. state of Pennsylvania New Boston-Morea (the United States)
- Coordinates: 40°47′28″N 76°10′3″W
- Country: United States
- State: Pennsylvania
- County: Schuylkill
- Township: Mahanoy

Area
  - Total: 0.46 sq mi (1.2 km^{2})
  - Land: 0.42 sq mi (1.1 km^{2})
  - Water: 0.039 sq mi (0.1 km^{2})

Population (2000)
  - Total: 441
  - Density: 1,000/sq mi (400/km^{2})
- Time zone: UTC-5 (Eastern (EST))
  - Summer (DST): UTC-4 (EDT)
- ZIP codes: 17948

New Boston-Morea (pronounced "Maria") was a census-designated place (CDP) in Schuylkill County, Pennsylvania, United States. The population was 441 at the 2000 census. It uses the Mahanoy City zip code of 17948. For the 2020 census, the area was split into two CDPs, Morea and New Boston.

== Geography ==
New Boston-Morea is located at 40°47′28″N 76°10′3″W (40.791189, -76.167412).

According to the United States Census Bureau, the CDP had a total area of 0.5 square miles (1.3 km^{2}), of which, 0.4 square miles (1.0 km^{2}) of it is land and 0.1 square miles (0.26 km^{2}) of it (10.64%) is water.

== Demographics ==
At the 2000 census there were 441 people, 177 households, and 124 families living in the CDP. The population density was 1,054.2 inhabitants per square mile (407.0/km^{2}). There were 197 housing units at an average density of 470.9 per square mile (181.8/km^{2}). The racial makeup of the CDP was 99.32% White, 0.45% Native American and 0.23% Asian. Of the 177 households 26.0% had children under the age of 18 living with them, 55.4% were married couples living together, 8.5% had a female householder with no husband present, and 29.4% were non-families. 26.6% of households were one person and 13.0% were one person aged 65 or older. The average household size was 2.49 and the average family size was 3.02.

The age distribution was 20.9% under the age of 18, 7.5% from 18 to 24, 27.0% from 25 to 44, 26.3% from 45 to 64, and 18.4% 65 or older. The median age was 40 years. For every 100 females, there were 106.1 males. For every 100 females age 18 and over, there were 105.3 males.

The median household income was $32,054 and the median family income was $38,462. Males had a median income of $26,818 versus $21,250 for females. The per capita income for the CDP was $15,243. About 7.3% of families and 9.9% of the population were below the poverty line, including 10.3% of those under age 18 and 10.0% of those age 65 or over.
