= Franklin Township, York County, Pennsylvania =

Township in Pennsylvania, US

Coordinates: 40°04′00″N 77°07′49″W

- Township
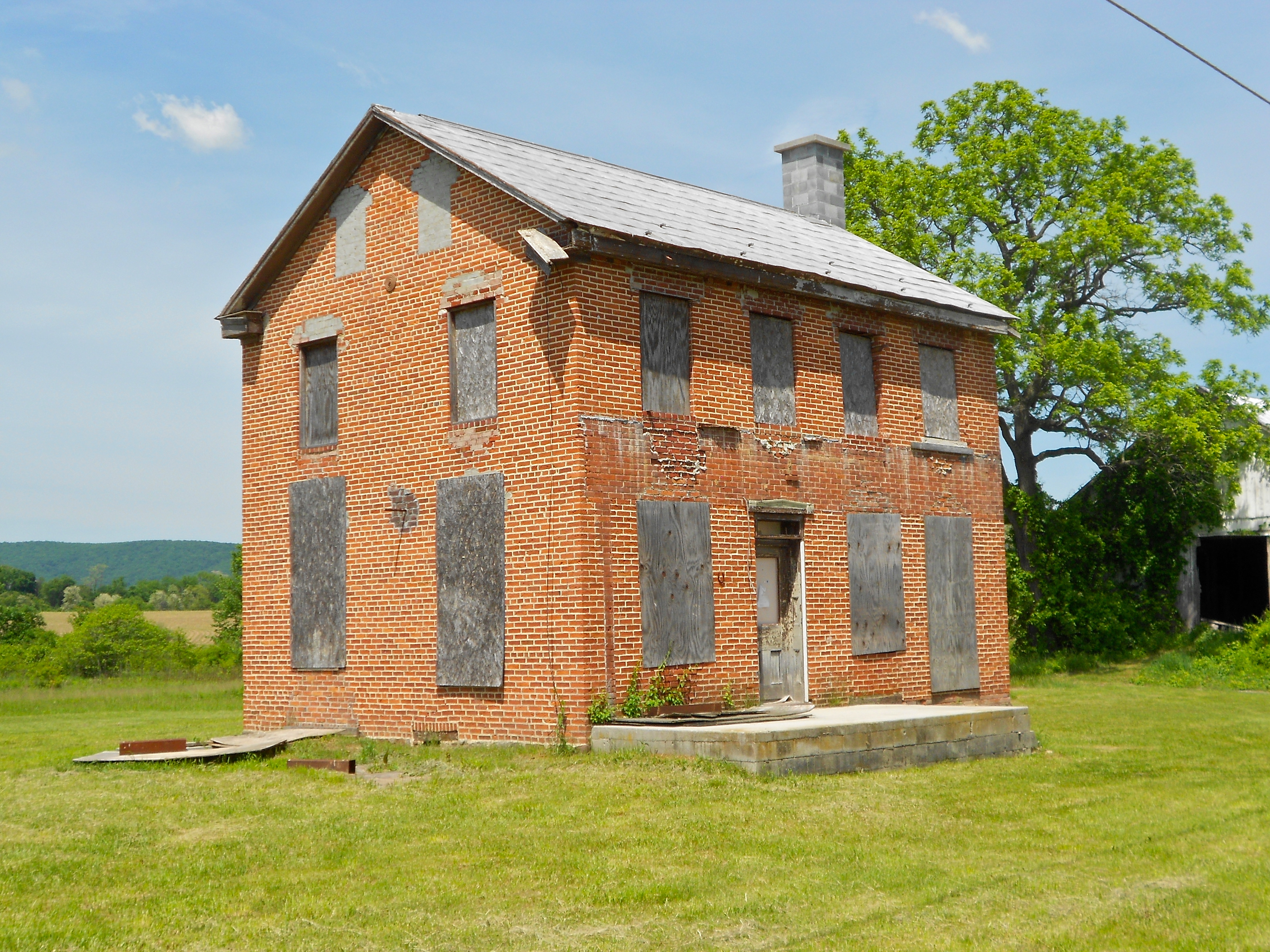
- House on Bypass Road before demolition

- Location in York County and the state of Pennsylvania.
- Country: United States
- State: Pennsylvania
- County: York
- Settled: 1740
- Incorporated: 1809

Government
  - Type: Board of Supervisors

Area
  - Total: 19.24 sq mi (49.82 km^{2})
  - Land: 19.19 sq mi (49.71 km^{2})
  - Water: 0.046 sq mi (0.12 km^{2})

Population (2020)
  - Total: 5,035 ▼
  - Estimate (2023): 5,110
  - Density: 262.1/sq mi (101.19/km^{2})
- Time zone: UTC-5 (Eastern (EST))
  - Summer (DST): UTC-4 (EDT)
- Area code: 717
- FIPS code: 42-133-27480
- Website: https://franklintownship.org/

Historical population
Census	Pop.	Note	%±
1850	815		—
1860	1,017		24.8%
1870	910		−10.5%
1880	952		4.6%
1890	952		0.0%
1900	895		−6.0%
1910	811		−9.4%
1920	718		−11.5%
1930	739		2.9%
1940	825		11.6%
1950	958		16.1%
1960	1,179		23.1%
1970	1,598		35.5%
1980	2,830		77.1%
1990	3,852		36.1%
2000	4,515		17.2%
2010	4,678		3.6%
2020	5,035		7.6%
2023 (est.)	5,110		1.5%
U.S. Decennial Census

Franklin Township is a township in York County, Pennsylvania, United States. The population was 5,035 at the 2020 census.

== History ==
Clear Spring Mill was listed on the National Register of Historic Places in 1996.

== Geography ==
According to the United States Census Bureau, the township has a total area of 19.2 square miles (50 km^{2}), of which 19.1 square miles (49 km^{2}) is land and 0.1 square miles (0.26 km^{2}), or 0.26%, is water. The township occupies the westernmost corner of York County in south-central Pennsylvania, and it surrounds the borough of Franklintown, located near the eastern corner of the township.

== Demographics ==
As of the census of 2020, there were 5,032 people, 1,920 households, and 1,284 families living in the township. The population density was 262.1 inhabitants per square mile (101.2/km^{2}). There was an unknown number of housing units. The racial makeup of the township was 93.3% White, 2.1% African American, 0.0% Native American, 0.9% Asian, 0.00% Pacific Islander, 1.8% Hispanics or Latino, and 3.7% from two or more races.

There were 1,920 households. The average household size was 2.62.

In the township the population was spread out, with 22.7% under the age of 18, 62.5% between the ages of 18 and 65, and 14.8% who were 65 years of age or older. 48.0% of the population consists of females and 52.0 percent of the population consists of males.

The median income for a household in the township was $70.507. The income per capita was $38,728. 7.5% of the population were in poverty.

From 2015 to 2019, there were 367 veterans.

From 2015 to 2019, 90.9% percent of the households had a computer, while 80.7% of the households had a broadband internet subscription. 97.1% of the population age 25 or higher has a high school graduate degree or higher, while 24.4% of the population age 25 or higher has a bachelor's degree or higher.

== Notable person ==
- Francis Charles Portzline, fraktur artist
