= Conewago Township, Dauphin County, Pennsylvania =

Township in Pennsylvania, US

Coordinates: 40°15′01″N 76°35′59″W

- Township
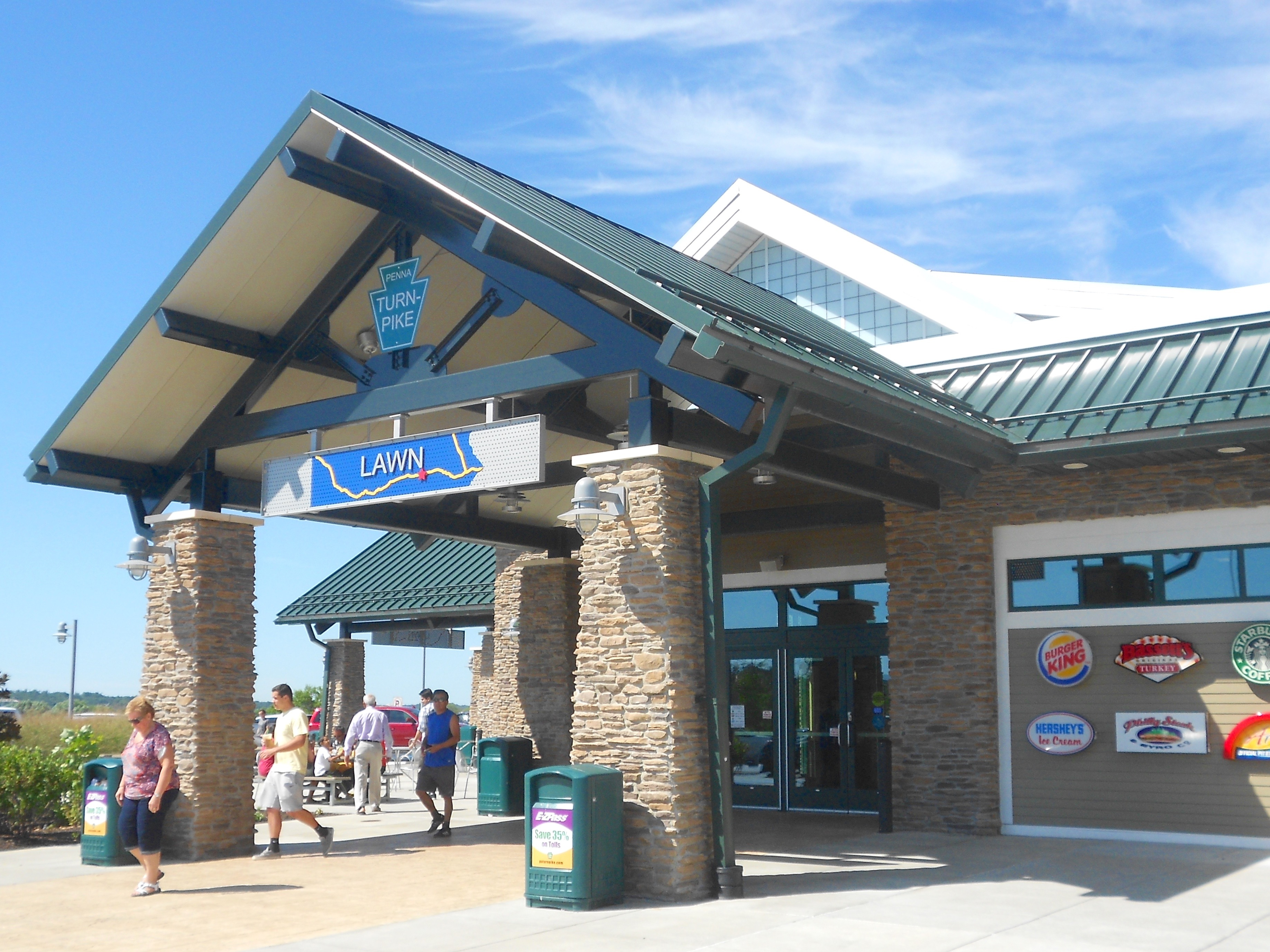
- Lawn Rest Stop on the Pennsylvania Turnpike

- Logo

- Location in Dauphin County and state of Pennsylvania
- Country: United States
- State: Pennsylvania
- County: Dauphin
- Settled: 1755
- Incorporated: 1850

Government
  - Type: Board of Supervisors
  - Chairman: Gary Painter

Area
  - Total: 16.73 sq mi (43.34 km^{2})
  - Land: 16.73 sq mi (43.34 km^{2})
  - Water: 0 sq mi (0.00 km^{2})

Population (2020)
  - Total: 2,949
  - Density: 180.5/sq mi (69.71/km^{2})
- Time zone: UTC-5 (Eastern (EST))
  - Summer (DST): UTC-4 (EDT)
- Area code: 717
- FIPS code: 42-043-15640
- Website: conewagotownship.com

Conewago Township is a township in Dauphin County, Pennsylvania, United States. The population was 2,997 at the 2010 census.

== History ==
Conewago Township was named from Conewago Creek, which forms its southern boundary. The name is an Indian word (either Delaware or Iroquois) meaning "at the place of rapids" (Conewaugha). Conewago Township was created in 1850 from parts of Derry and Londonderry townships. It is located in Dauphin County, which used to be part of Lancaster County, and before that part of Chester County.

== Geography ==
The township occupies the southeastern corner of Dauphin County, bordered to the south (across Conewago Creek) by Lancaster County and to the east by Lebanon County. The unincorporated community of Bachmanville is in the northeastern part of the township, and Deodate is near the center.

According to the United States Census Bureau, the township has a total area of 16.7 square miles (43.3 km^{2}), all land.

== Demographics ==
Historical population
Census	Pop.	Note	%±
2000	2,847		—
2010	2,997		5.3%
2020	2,949		−1.6%
2023 (est.)	3,009		2.0%
U.S. Decennial Census

As of the census of 2000, there were 2,847 people, 1,019 households, and 814 families residing in the township. The population density was 170.1 inhabitants per square mile (65.7/km^{2}). There were 1,069 housing units at an average density of 63.9 per square mile (24.7/km^{2}). The racial makeup of the township was 97.61% White, 0.81% African American, 0.39% Asian, 0.14% Pacific Islander, 0.35% from other races, and 0.70% from two or more races. Hispanic or Latino of any race were 0.95% of the population.

There were 1,019 households, out of which 37.0% had children under the age of 18 living with them, 69.6% were married couples living together, 7.2% had a female householder with no husband present, and 20.1% were non-families. 15.8% of all households were made up of individuals, and 4.1% had someone living alone who was 65 years of age or older. The average household size was 2.79 and the average family size was 3.08.

In the township the population was spread out, with 26.5% under the age of 18, 7.4% from 18 to 24, 29.0% from 25 to 44, 27.6% from 45 to 64, and 9.5% who were 65 years of age or older. The median age was 39 years. For every 100 females, there were 101.8 males. For every 100 females age 18 and over, there were 100.9 males.

The median income for a household in the township was $58,922, and the median income for a family was $65,195. Males had a median income of $43,438 versus $28,514 for females. The per capita income for the township was $26,898. About 4.3% of families and 5.7% of the population were below the poverty line, including 10.8% of those under age 18 and 7.4% of those age 65 or over.

== Notable person ==
- Christian Mertel, fraktur artist
