= Heinrich Engelhard =

Heinrich Engelhard may refer to:

- Heinrich Engelhard (priest) (fl. 1476–1551), Swiss canon, humanist, and supporter of the Reformation in Zürich.
- George Heinrich Engellhard (fl. 1805), American fraktur artist.
- Henry E. Steinway (1797–1871), born Heinrich Engelhard Steinweg, German-American piano maker.
