= Mahanoy Township, Pennsylvania =

Township in Pennsylvania, US

Coordinates: 40°50′00″N 76°07′59″W

- Township
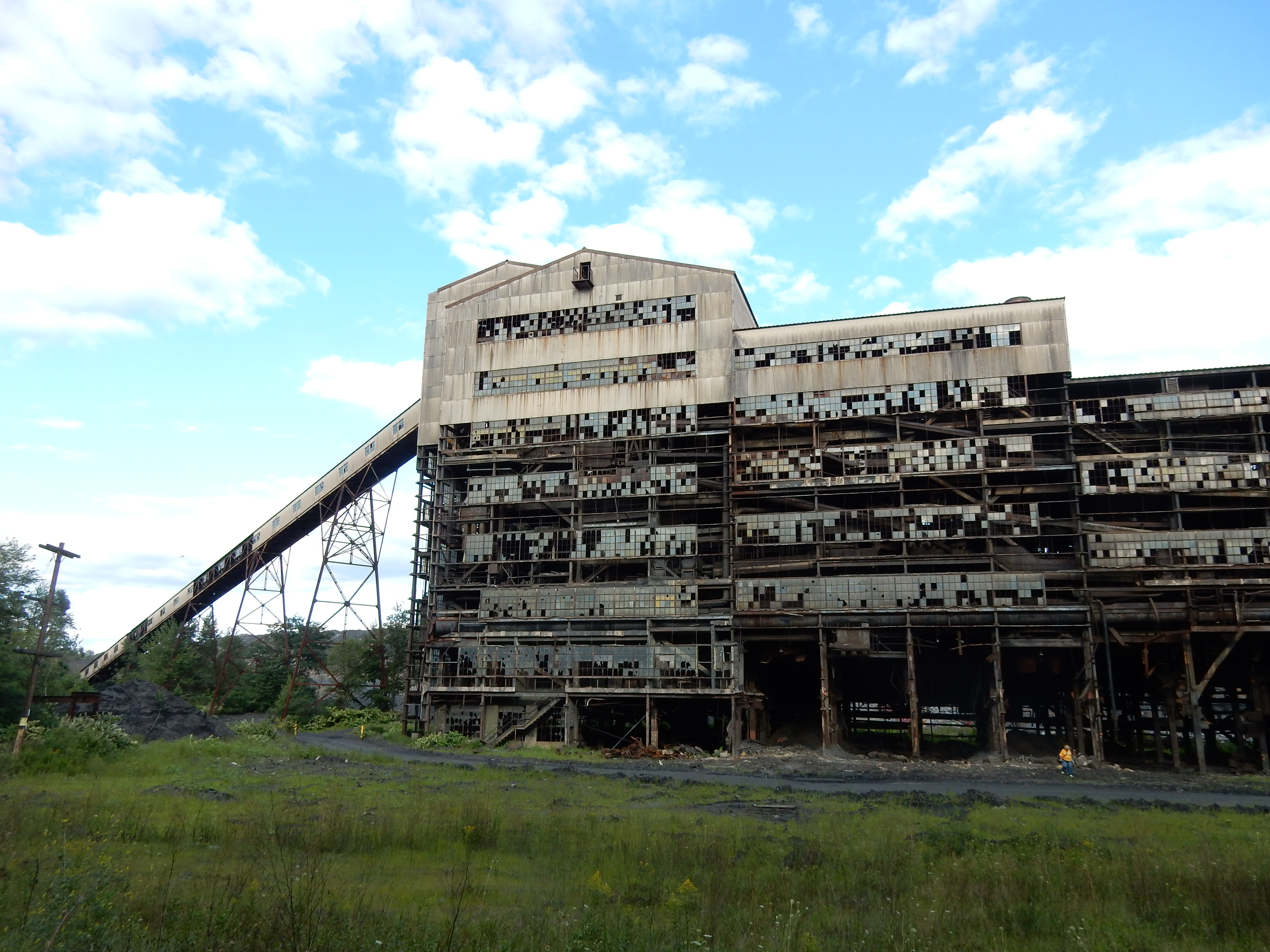
- Old St. Nicholas coal breaker near village of St. Nicholas in Mahanoy Township

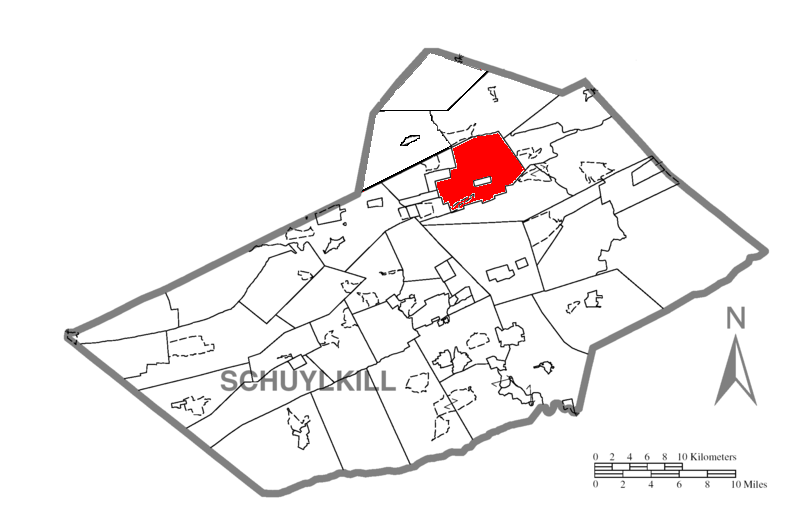
- Map of Schuylkill County, Pennsylvania Highlighting Mahanoy Township

- Map of Schuylkill County, Pennsylvania
- Country: United States
- State: Pennsylvania
- County: Schuylkill
- Settled: 1791
- Incorporated: 1849

Area
  - Total: 21.27 sq mi (55.09 km^{2})
  - Land: 21.08 sq mi (54.59 km^{2})
  - Water: 0.19 sq mi (0.50 km^{2})

Population (2020)
  - Total: 3,192 ▲
  - Estimate (2023): 3,001
  - Density: 156.4/sq mi (60.39/km^{2})
- Time zone: UTC-5 (Eastern (EST))
  - Summer (DST): UTC-4 (EDT)
- FIPS code: 42-107-46584

Mahanoy Township is a township in Schuylkill County, Pennsylvania, United States. The population was 3,192 at the 2020 census.

== Geography ==
According to the United States Census Bureau, the township has a total area of 21.1 square miles (54.7 km^{2}), of which 20.9 square miles (54.0 km^{2}) is land and 0.3 square mile (0.7 km^{2}) (1.28%) is water. Its southern boundary areas are on Broad Mountain and the northern tier is also mountainous, so most of the people live in the valley of the Mahanoy Creek, which flows westward into the Susquehanna River.

Its unincorporated communities include Bear Run, Boston Run, Bowmans, Buck Mountain, Craigs, Ellen Gowen, Hills Terrace, Maple Hill, Morea, New Boston, Park Place, St. Nicholas, Shoemakers, Turkey Run, Yatesville and Vulcan. Other localities and patch towns include Coles Patch, Foundry Row, Glendon, Meyers, Patriotic Hill and Robinsons. Suffolk and Wiggans are the latter two patches within Boston Run and St. Nicholas. The borough of Mahanoy City is surrounded by Mahanoy Township.

The township is served by Interstate 81, east-to-west Route 54, and north-to-south Route 339. 339 starts in Mahanoy City on 54 and proceeds northwest through Brandonville to provide access to Columbia County. I-81 access is obtained via Route 54 in the southeastern part of the township near Vulcan or from Route 61 just south of Frackville. Other important local roads include Buck Mountain Road, Centre Street, Delano Road, Main Street, Morea Road, and Park Place Road.

== Demographics ==
Historical population
Census	Pop.	Note	%±
2000	1,112		—
2010	3,152		183.5%
2020	3,192		1.3%
2023 (est.)	3,001		−6.0%
U.S. Decennial Census

As of the census of 2000, there were 1,112 people, 436 households, and 299 families living in the township. The population density was 53.3 inhabitants per square mile (20.6/km^{2}). There were 490 housing units at an average density of 23.5/sq mi (9.1/km^{2}). The racial makeup of the township was 99.73% White, 0.18% Native American and 0.09% Asian. Hispanic or Latino people of any race were 0.09% of the population.

There were 436 households, out of which 25.5% had children under the age of 18 living with them, 49.5% were married couples living together, 12.2% had a female householder with no husband present, and 31.4% were non-families. 27.5% of all households were made up of individuals, and 14.2% had someone living alone who was 65 years of age or older. The average household size was 2.49 and the average family size was 3.05.

In the township the population was spread out, with 20.5% under the age of 18, 7.4% from 18 to 24, 25.4% from 25 to 44, 25.6% from 45 to 64, and 21.0% who were 65 years of age or older. The median age was 43 years. For every 100 females, there were 105.2 males. For every 100 females age 18 and over, there were 99.5 males.

The median income for a household in the township was $30,625, and the median income for a family was $35,625. Males had a median income of $28,906 versus $21,250 for females. The per capita income for the township was $14,755. About 9.2% of families and 13.4% of the population were below the poverty line, including 16.8% of those under age 18 and 6.5% of those age 65 or over.

== Government ==
=== Supervisors ===
- Theodore Styka, chairman
- James Stevens
- Bill Pecika

=== Legislators ===
- State Representative Neal Goodman, Democrat, 123rd district
- State Senator Dave Argall, Republican, 29th district
- US Representative Dan Meuser, Republican, 9th district

== Government and infrastructure ==
The prison State Correctional Institution – Mahanoy is in the township.

== Education ==
It is in the Mahanoy Area School District.

== Notable people ==
- Daniel Otto, fraktur artist
- Johann Henrich Otto, fraktur artist
