= John Van Minian =

American painter

John Van Minian (active 1791-1835) was an American fraktur artist.

Little information about Van Minian is known, and he remains an obscure figure despite continued efforts to develop a biography for him. He was initially identified by his signature on a birth record in the collection of the Abby Aldrich Rockefeller Folk Art Museum, which has aided in the identification of a body of birth, baptismal, marriage, and family records and decorated religious texts. Examples of his art are known from Berks and Montgomery Counties, Pennsylvania, and Baltimore County, Maryland; a marriage and family record for a couple in Dorset, Vermont, dated 1826, is also his. The bride listed on the Vermont fraktur, Sidanna Shannon, was actually Sidney Shannon of Northampton, PA and was the daughter of Mary Ammerman, of German or Dutch heritage, which may explain the connection. The latest work ascribed to him, of around twenty in total, dates to 1835. Stylistically, Van Minian divided his compositions into carefully ruled sections in which he depicted figures in profile. Men are often seen looking through spyglasses. Other elements of his pictures include stylized floral designs, symbolic, and patriotic elements, such as eagles. Texts are in English or German, often written in an ornate Gothic calligraphy but sometimes in cursive. The drawing is precise, as is the application of watercolor.

A family register by Van Minian sold at auction in 2011 for $36,250. One of his religious pieces is in the collection of the American Folk Art Museum.
