= Earl Township, Lancaster County, Pennsylvania =

Township in Pennsylvania, US

Coordinates: 40°07′00″N 76°07′35″W

- Township
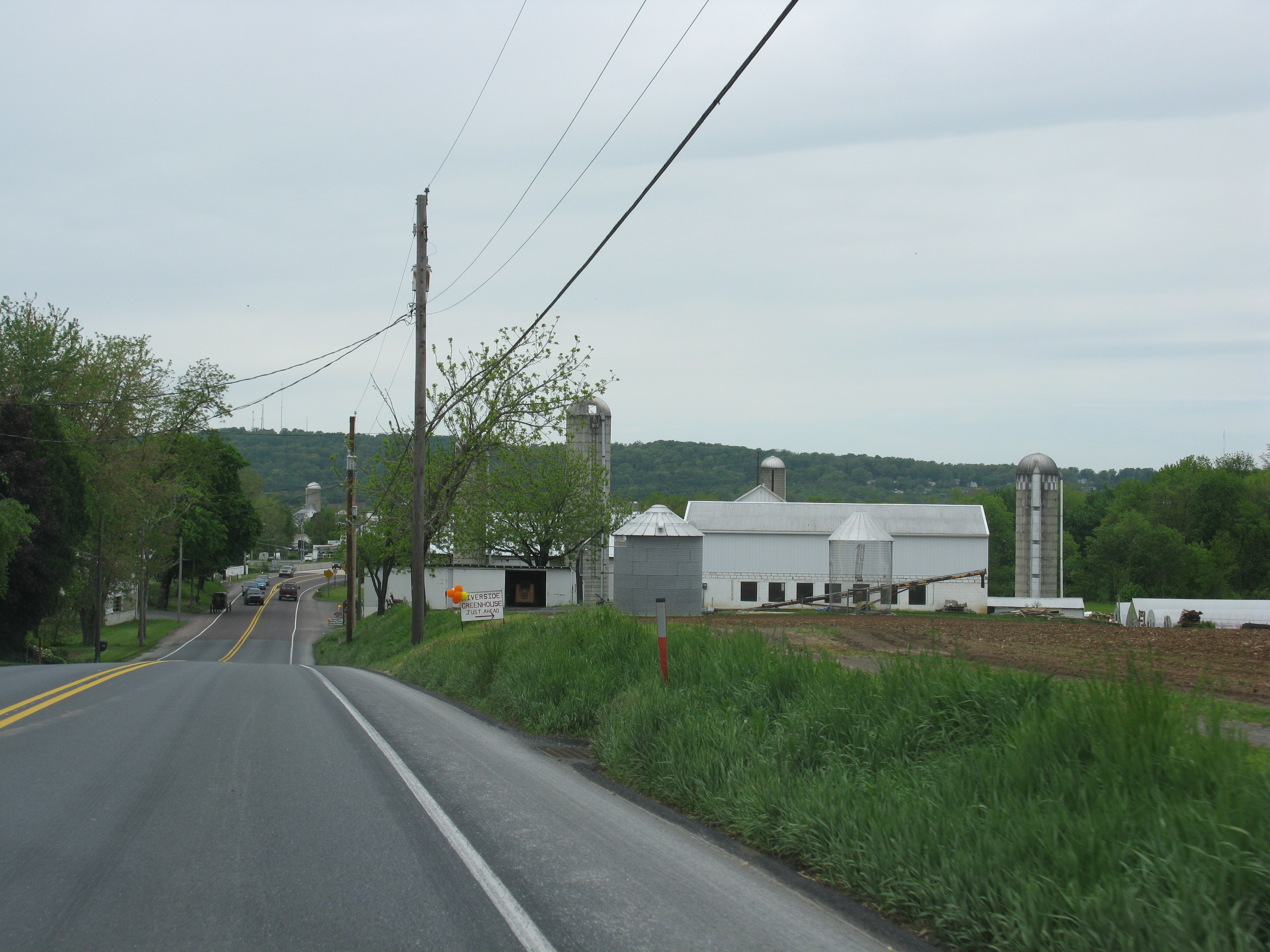
- Hinkletown, a small community in Earl Township

- Seal

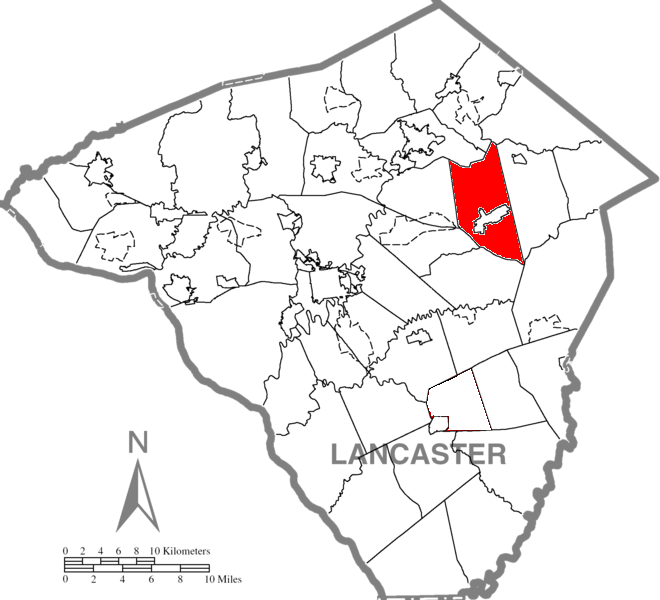
- Map of Lancaster County highlighting Earl Township
- Country: United States
- State: Pennsylvania
- County: Lancaster
- Settled: 1717
- Incorporated: 1729

Government
  - Type: Board of Supervisors

Area
  - Total: 22.10 sq mi (57.24 km^{2})
  - Land: 21.96 sq mi (56.87 km^{2})
  - Water: 0.14 sq mi (0.36 km^{2})

Population (2020)
  - Total: 7,144
  - Estimate (2025): 7,149 ▲
  - Density: 325.8/sq mi (125.79/km^{2})
- Time zone: UTC-5 (Eastern (EST))
  - Summer (DST): UTC-4 (EDT)
- Area code: 717
- FIPS code: 42-071-20688
- Website: earltownship.com

Earl Township is a township in northeastern Lancaster County, Pennsylvania, United States. The population was 7,149 at the 2020 census.

== History ==
The David Davis Farm was listed on the National Register of Historic Places in 1994.

== Geography ==
According to the U.S. Census Bureau, the township has a total area of 22.0 square miles (57 km^{2}), 22.0 square miles (57 km^{2}) of which is land and 0.04 square miles (0.10 km^{2}) (0.14%) of which is water. It contains the communities of Martindale, Hinkletown, Vogansville, and Laurel Hill, and it surrounds the borough of New Holland, a separate municipality.

== Demographics ==
Historical population
Census	Pop.	Note	%±
2000	6,183		—
2010	7,024		13.6%
2020	7,144		1.7%
2025 (est.)	7,149		0.1%
U.S. Decennial Census

As of the census of 2000, there were 6,183 people, 2,019 households, and 1,617 families living in the township. The population density was 281.7 inhabitants per square mile (108.8/km^{2}). There were 2,126 housing units at an average density of 96.9 per square mile (37.4/km^{2}). The racial makeup of the township was 97.27% White, 0.60% African American, 1.15% Asian, 0.19% from other races, and 0.79% from two or more races. Hispanic or Latino of any race were 1.07% of the population.

There were 2,019 households, out of which 34.5% had children under the age of 18 living with them, 72.4% were married couples living together, 5.4% had a female householder with no husband present, and 19.9% were non-families. 17.9% of all households were made up of individuals, and 11.1% had someone living alone who was 65 years of age or older. The average household size was 3.06 and the average family size was 3.50.

In the township the population was spread out, with 31.6% under the age of 18, 9.3% from 18 to 24, 21.0% from 25 to 44, 20.3% from 45 to 64, and 17.9% who were 65 years of age or older. The median age was 34 years. For every 100 females, there were 92.3 males. For every 100 females age 18 and over, there were 89.1 males.

The median income for a household in the township was $39,266, and the median income for a family was $42,667. Males had a median income of $32,635 versus $21,211 for females. The per capita income for the township was $17,503. About 9.5% of families and 15.0% of the population were below the poverty line, including 25.9% of those under age 18 and 8.4% of those age 65 or over.

== Notable person ==
- Christian Alsdorff, fraktur artist
