= Daniel Otto =

American painter

Daniel Otto (c. 1770–1822) was an American fraktur artist.

== Biography ==
Otto was born in Lebanon County, Pennsylvania, the son of fraktur artist Johann Henrich Otto. When his father moved from Schaefferstown, Daniel followed suit, moving with him to Mahanoy Township, then in Northumberland County, where the elder Otto took up a post at St. Peter's Church. Eventually he moved to Brush Valley, Miles Township, Centre County, later moving to Aaronsburg in the same county. In 1821 his name was removed from that community's tax list, indicating that he may have moved elsewhere. For much of his life Otto worked as a schoolmaster; he was married, and had a large family. He is believed to have died in Centre County, in Haines Township.

Otto has also been called the "Flat Tulip Artist" due to the large, flat tulips which feature in many of his paintings. Other symbols which recur in his art include parrots, birds with long necks, mermen and mermaids, alligators, and paired lions. On certificates he tended to compartmentalize his texts, unlike his father. He favored ochres and yellows when painting his works, which tend to be more vivid than those of his father and brothers. Three pieces by Otto are in the collection of the Winterthur Museum, Another is held in the collection of Franklin & Marshall College.
