= Sussel-Washington Artist =

American painter

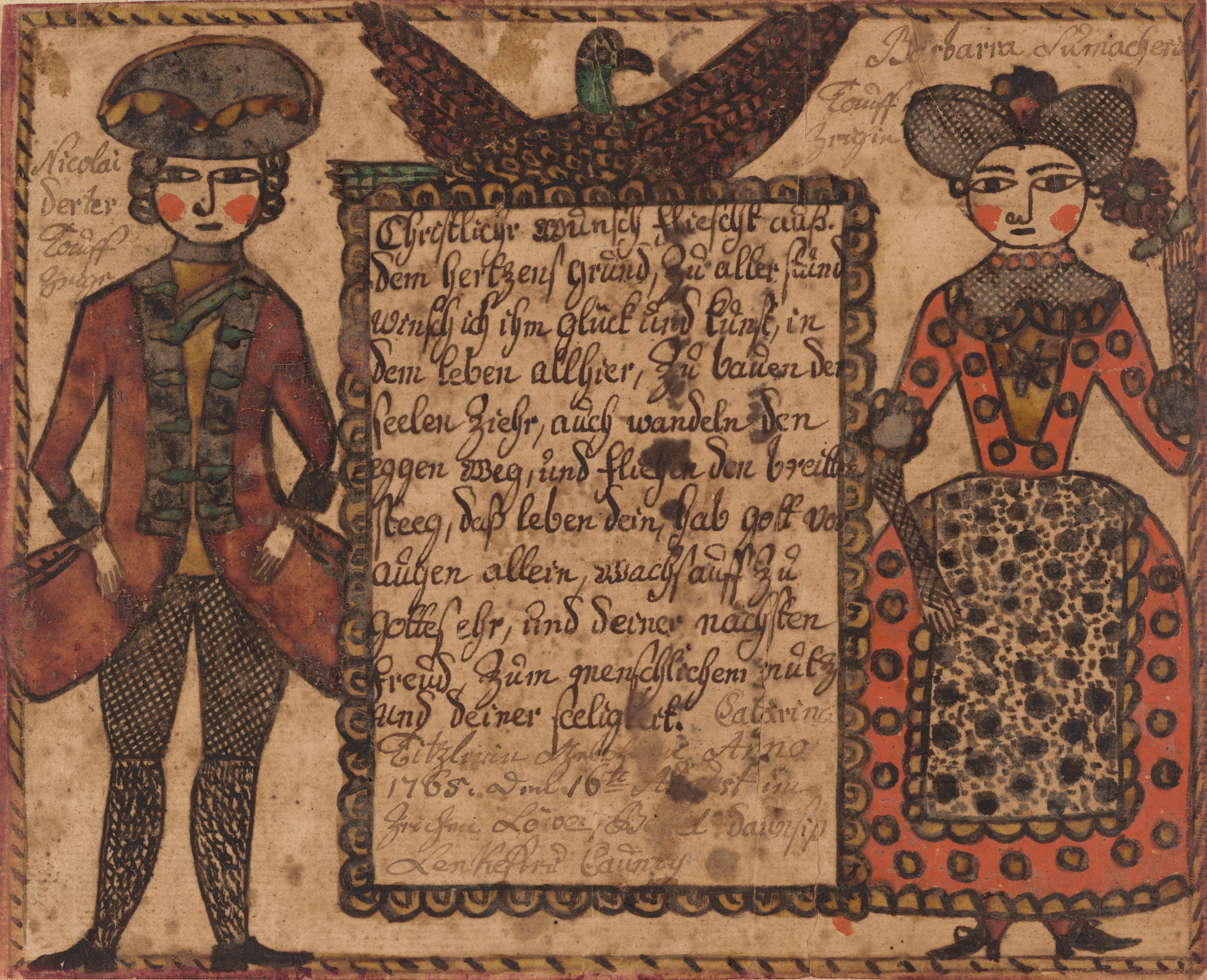
Baptismal Wish for Catarina Titzlir of c. 1765, in the collection of the National Gallery of Art

The Sussel-Washington Artist was an American fraktur artist active during the 1770s and 1780s.

Several dozen drawings, mainly baptismal greetings, have been identified as being by this artist, whose name comes from a depiction of George and Martha Washington in the collection of Arthur Sussel. The artist is considered among the most important among the Pennsylvania Germans, and much has been gleaned from the drawings which he, or she, left behind. Texts included in the artist's pieces are the same as those used in European Goettlebriefe, which are souvenirs of baptism given to the child by its sponsors. The imagery of the pictures is unique in American fraktur, including such things as women in "bee-bonnet"-type hats. Relatively few works by the artist are known, but they have been found all over Pennsylvania, with examples known from Berks, Lebanon, Dauphin, Lancaster, York, and Schuylkill Counties. They speak to an artist who traveled a great deal, a fact which has hampered the process of identification; a similar case is that of the Ehre Vater Artist. None of the artist's surviving work is signed or initialed. Surviving images, besides baptismal records, include drawings for animals and of children, and images of people on horseback, including depictions of the Washingtons, the Princess of Sudbury, and Adam and Eve; these pieces are especially fine in their execution. Some images include birds carrying cherries; another includes a possible depiction of wallpaper in the background. Sources of the artist's designs are unknown, but the work of Johann Conrad Gilbert suggests their influence. Examples of work by the artist survive in which the outlines have been filled in by another hand, suggesting the presence at death of a collection of blank forms that continued in use. A group of the artist's frakturs is associated with Bethel Township in Berks County.

A depiction of Martha Washington by the Sussel-Washington Artist is owned by the American Folk Art Museum, while an image of her and her husband is held by the Abby Aldrich Rockefeller Folk Art Museum. A drawing of George Washington is owned by Independence National Historical Park. Five works are in the Winterthur Museum collection, and six are in the Philadelphia Museum of Art. Two works are in the National Gallery of Art. Another piece ascribed to the artist appeared on Antiques Roadshow in 2014, where it was appraised at between $25,000 and $35,000.
