= Johannes Ernst Spangenberg =

American painter

Johannes Ernst (sometimes Ernestus) Spangenberg (1755–1814) was an American fraktur artist.

Spangenberg was for many years called the "Easton Bible artist" because he decorated a Bible for the German Reformed church located in Easton, Pennsylvania. Most of his pieces were created for children in the vicinities of Easton and Greenwich Township, Sussex County, New Jersey, on the other side of the Delaware River; he also worked in Nockamixon Township, Bucks County, Pennsylvania. He produced birth and baptismal ledgers and ownership pages for ledgers and books, and decorated two Bibles during his career, both for religious congregations. He was a veteran of the American Revolutionary War and a member of the Lutheran Church. By profession a schoolmaster, Spangenberg was a resident of Easton along with his wife, Elizabeth Blantz, with whom he had eleven children. He is buried in the Hays Cemetery in Easton.

For many years Spangenberg's name was unknown, until he was identified by Smithsonian Institution curator Monroe Fabian. A unique feature of his work is the depiction, in many of his pieces, of musicians carrying and playing their instruments. He was bilingual, sometimes producing inscriptions for the same individual in both English and German. Examples of his work are in the collections of the American Folk Art Museum and the Winterthur Museum.
