= Martindale, Pennsylvania =

Unincorporated community in Pennsylvania, US

- Unincorporated community
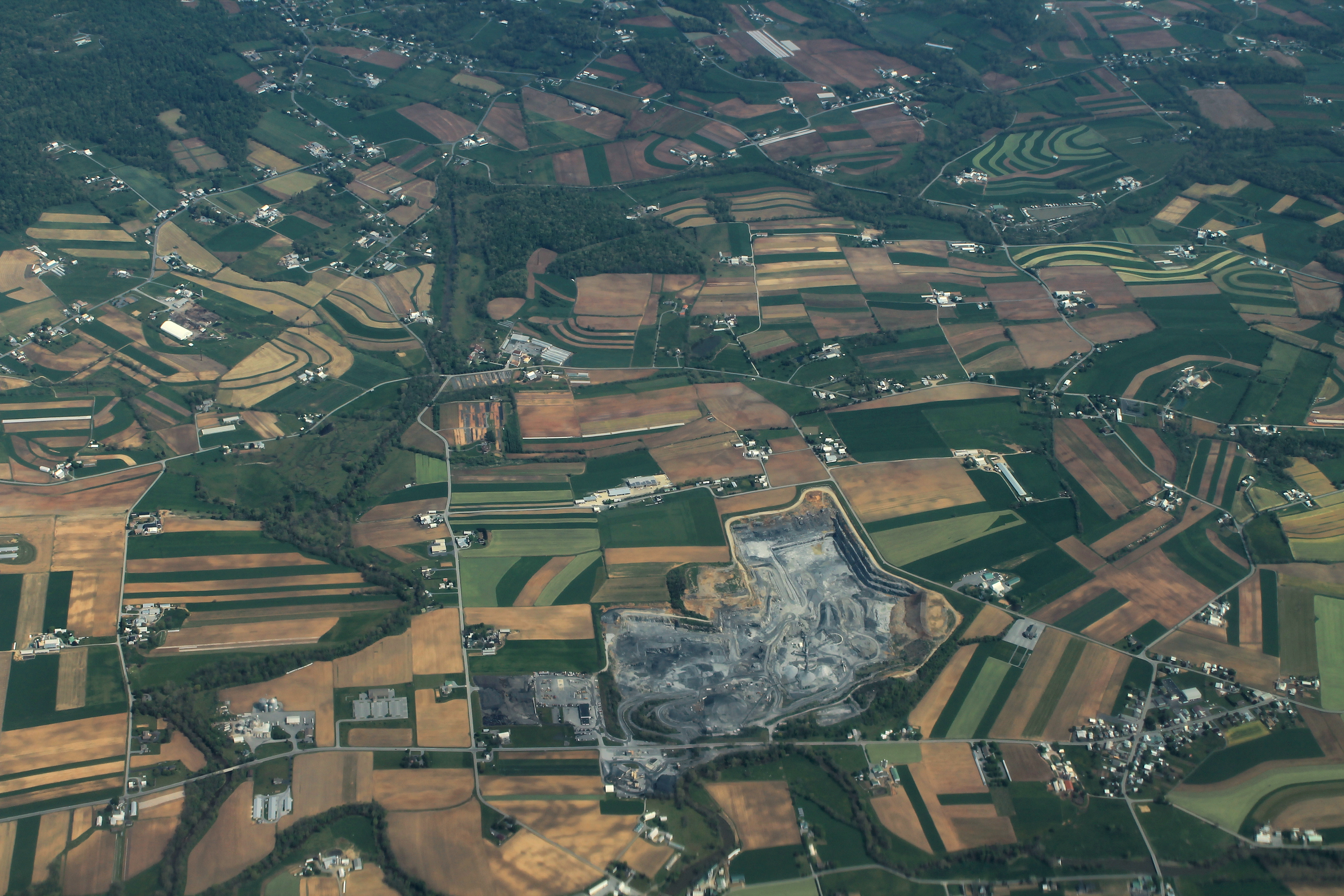
- Aerial view of Martindale
- Interactive map of Martindale, Pennsylvania
- Coordinates: 40°9′11.34″N 76°5′18.81″W
- Country: United States
- State: Pennsylvania
- County: Lancaster
- Township: Earl
- Elevation: 377 ft (115 m)
- Time zone: UTC-5 (Eastern (EST))
  - Summer (DST): UTC-4 (EDT)
- GNIS feature ID: 1180499

Martindale is an unincorporated community located in Earl Township in Lancaster County, Pennsylvania, United States.

The center of Martindale is located at the intersection of Martindale Road and Gristmill Road. Eby's General Store currently sits at this intersection.
