= Aaronsburg Historic District =

Historic district in Pennsylvania, United States

- U.S. National Register of Historic Places
- U.S. Historic district
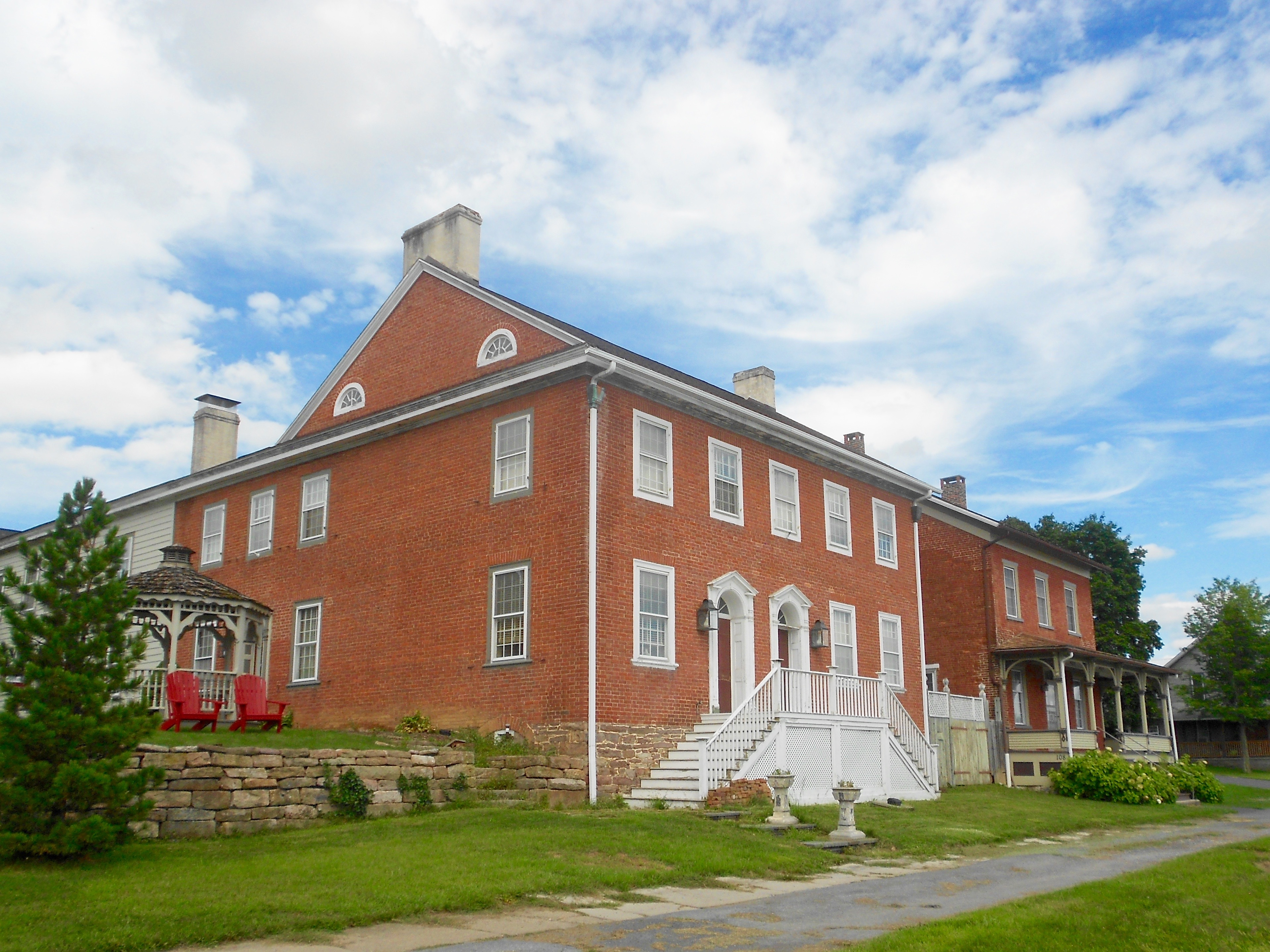
- Aaronsburg Inn

- Location within Pennsylvania Location within the United States
- Location: PA 45, Aaronsburg, Pennsylvania
- Coordinates: 40°54′2″N 77°27′10″W
- Area: 99.7 acres (40.3 ha)
- Built: 1786
- Architectural style: Late Victorian, Georgian, Gothic Revival
- NRHP reference No.: 80003452
- Added to NRHP: September 2, 1980

The Aaronsburg Historic District is a national historic district located in Aaronsburg, Centre County, Pennsylvania. The district includes two hundred and seventy-seven contributing buildings, three contributing sites, and one contributing object in Aaronsburg.

It was added to the National Register of Historic Places in 1980.

== History and features ==
The district is almost exclusively residential with one grocery store and a post office. Among the types of residential building types present are the two deep / sidehall type, English "I"-type, connected or double houses, simple Gothic type, and an eclectic cubic type. Notable dwellings include the Jacob Oliver House (c. 1820), Bollinger House and Shop (c. 1806), Dr. Michael Kloepper House (c. 1803), John Donner House (c. 1816), George Hess House and Shop (c. 1812), and the George Bowersox House (c. 1806).

== Gallery ==
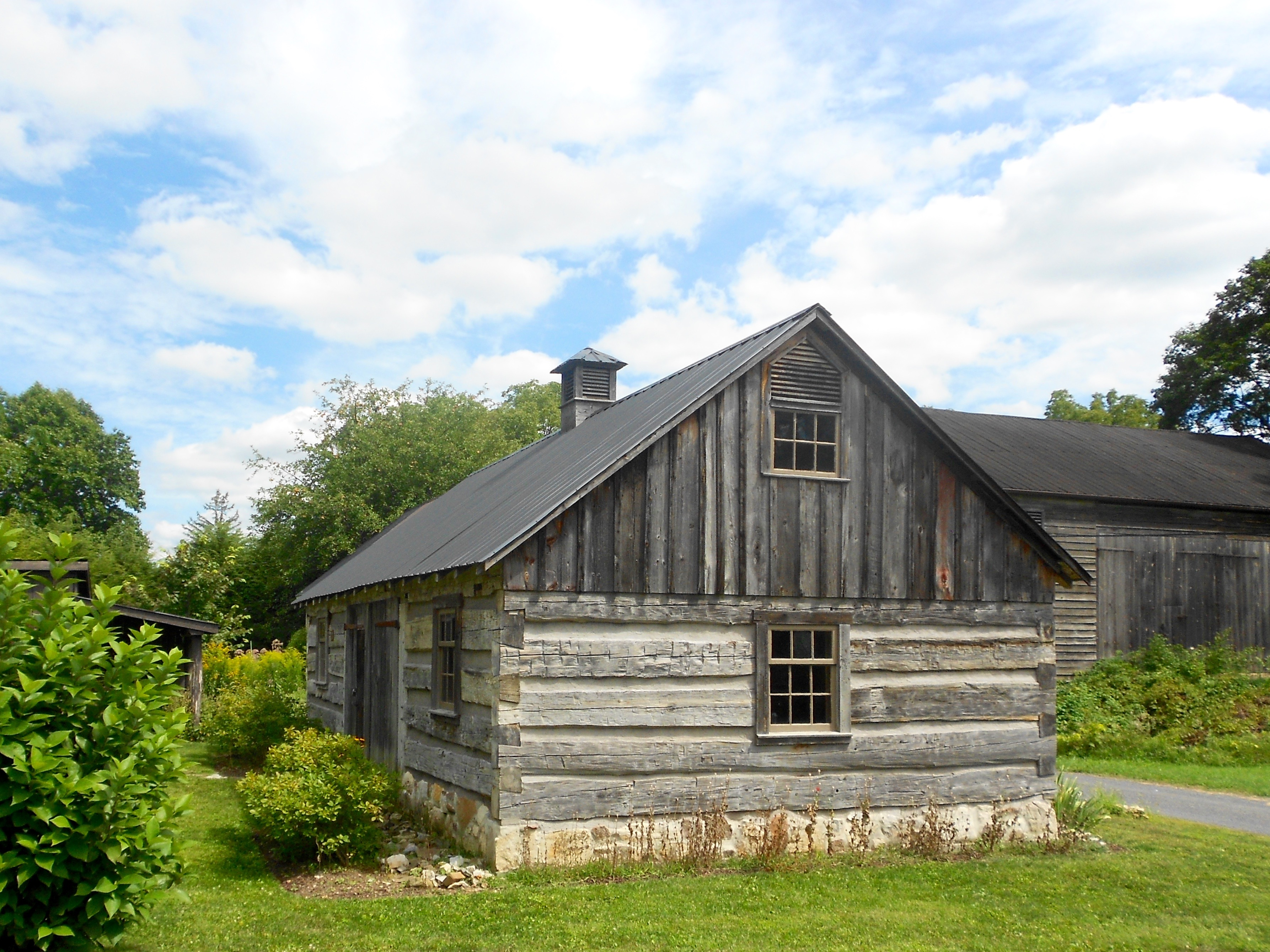
Log house

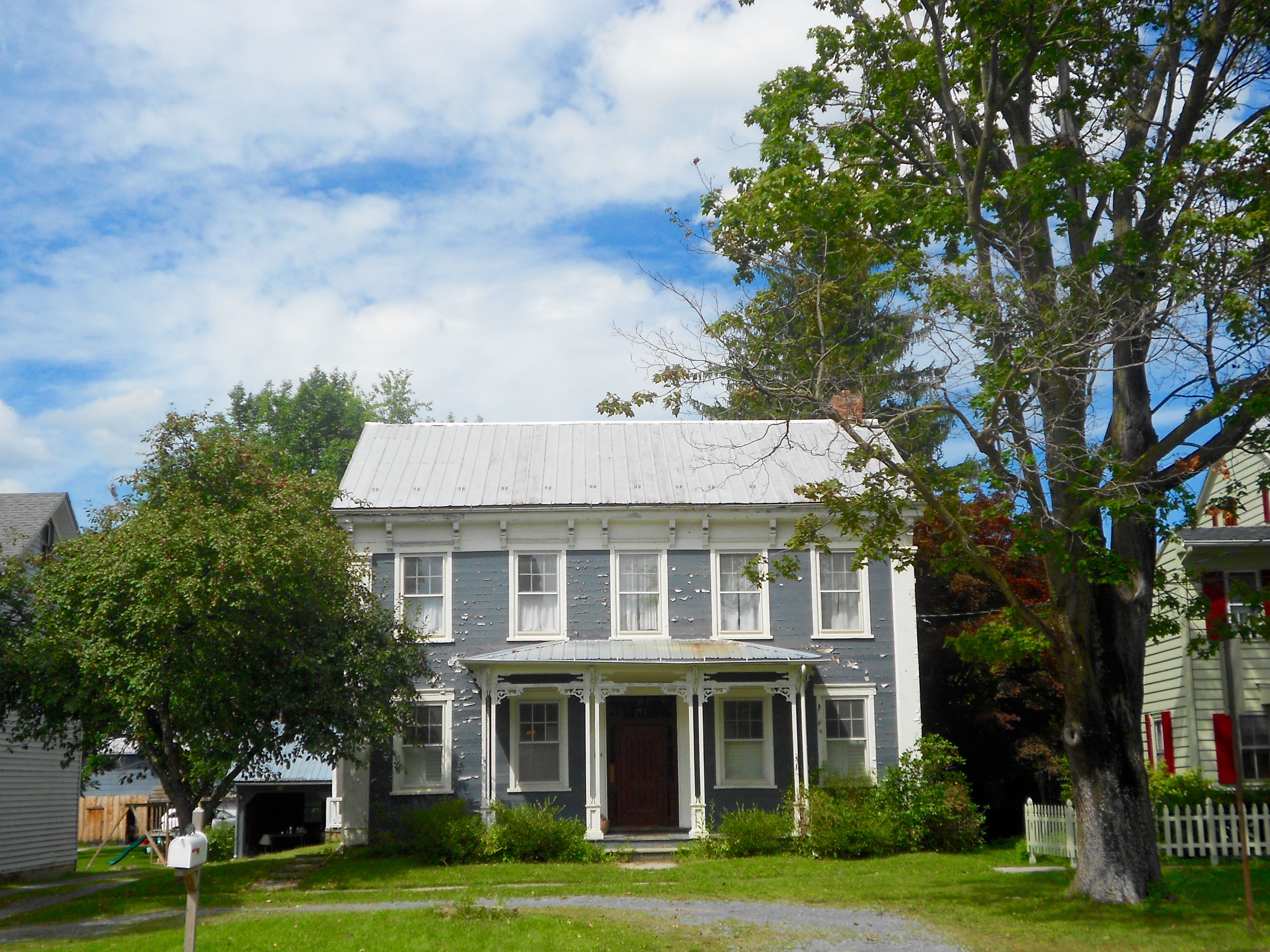
5-bay house

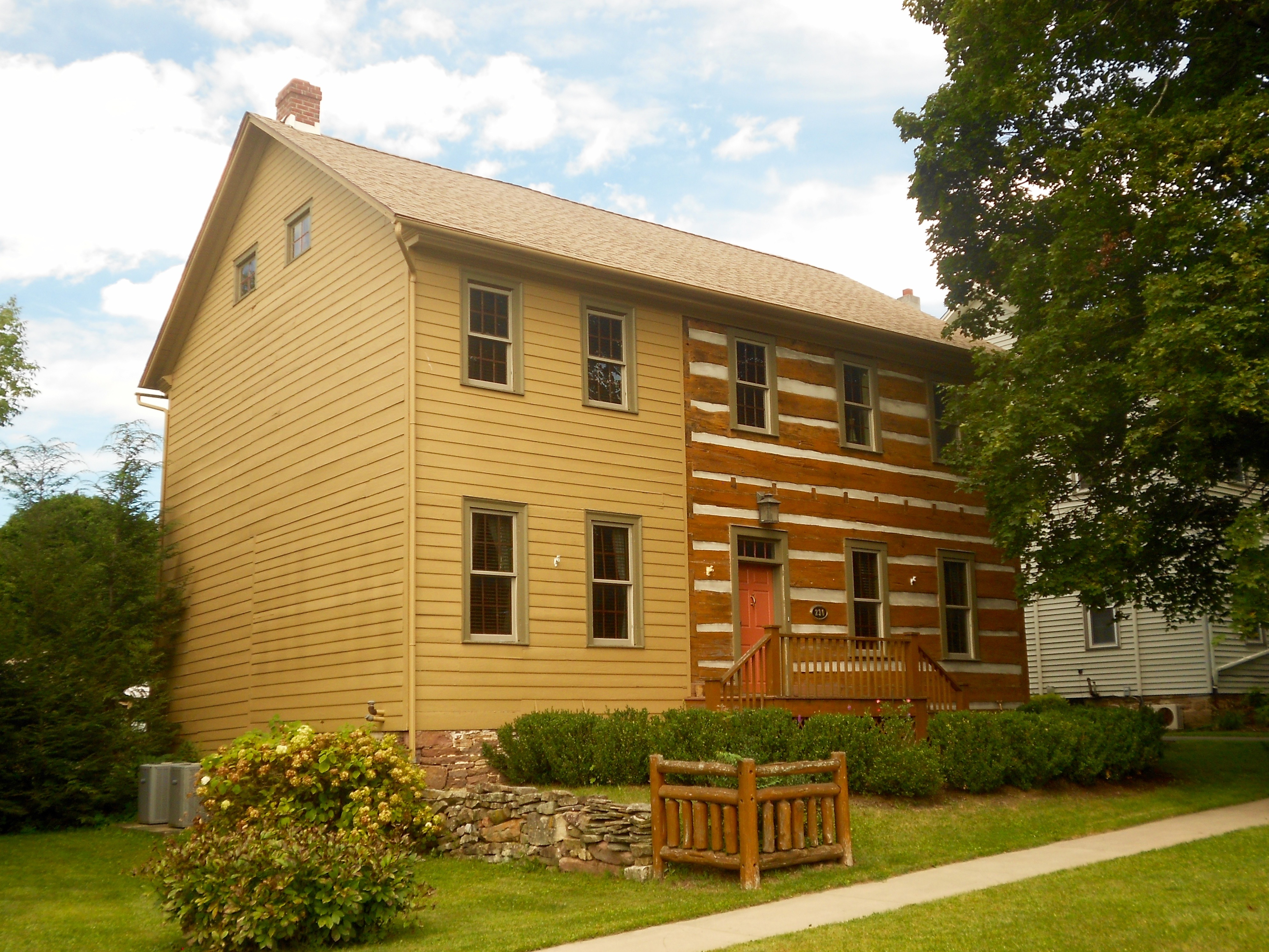
Plank house
