= George Peter Deisert =

American fraktur artist

George Peter Deisert (1732 – c. 1810) was an American fraktur artist.

A native of Niederhochstadt in the Palatinate, Deisert arrived in Pennsylvania in 1764. He is next recorded in the vicinity of Littlestown, in the records of the Christ Reformed Church, at which he most likely served as schoolmaster. He married Wilhelmina Hund, and with her had several children, his son John succeeding him in his educational role. In 1776 the couple were serving as baptismal sponsors in the Middletown Valley of Frederick County, Maryland. He died intestate near Littletown. Deisert produced mostly baptismal records, distinguished by the careful crosshatching of their backgrounds. No influence on his work has been detected, although he was contemporary to a group of printers working in nearby Hanover who published such certificates from the 1790s until the 1840s. It has been posited that the fraktur artist Johannes Bard was a pupil. Deisert also produced new years' greetings for neighbor girls, and wrote at least two sheets with German-language hymns. His work is distinguished by its careful lettering.

Four examples of Deisert's work are in the collection of the Winterthur Museum.
