= Daniel Peterman =

American painter (1797–1871)

Daniel Peterman (1797–1871) was an American fraktur artist. A third-generation American, Peterman was a native of Shrewsbury Township, York County, Pennsylvania, where he died. A member of the Reformed Church, he was a schoolmaster in that tradition, and in the Lutheran Church as well. He was married and had children. Much of his fraktur was produced for the children of York County, and many of his pieces are similar to one another in their format, in which two female figures border the text and various flowers and birds are added as decoration. For his family, he created more elaborate pictures, in which a variety of objects, from sailing ships to pianos, are shown. One baptismal record for a nephew includes in its decorative scheme a market house, chickens, and a dog. Sometimes he added Adam and Eve into his compositions; he also drew courting couples. His palette is bright. Peterman used ruled paper to continue his art when hand-milled paper became unavailable; he continued to work well into the 1860s. He was among the most prolific fraktur artists active in York County, alongside Johannes Bard. Nearly all of his pieces were made for families in Paradise, Codorus, Shrewsbury and Manheim townships.

A piece by Peterman sold at auction in 2015 for $9,680.
