= Hinkletown, Pennsylvania =

Unincorporated community in Pennsylvania, US

Hinkletown, Pennsylvania Hinkelschteddel (Pennsylvania German)
- Unincorporated community
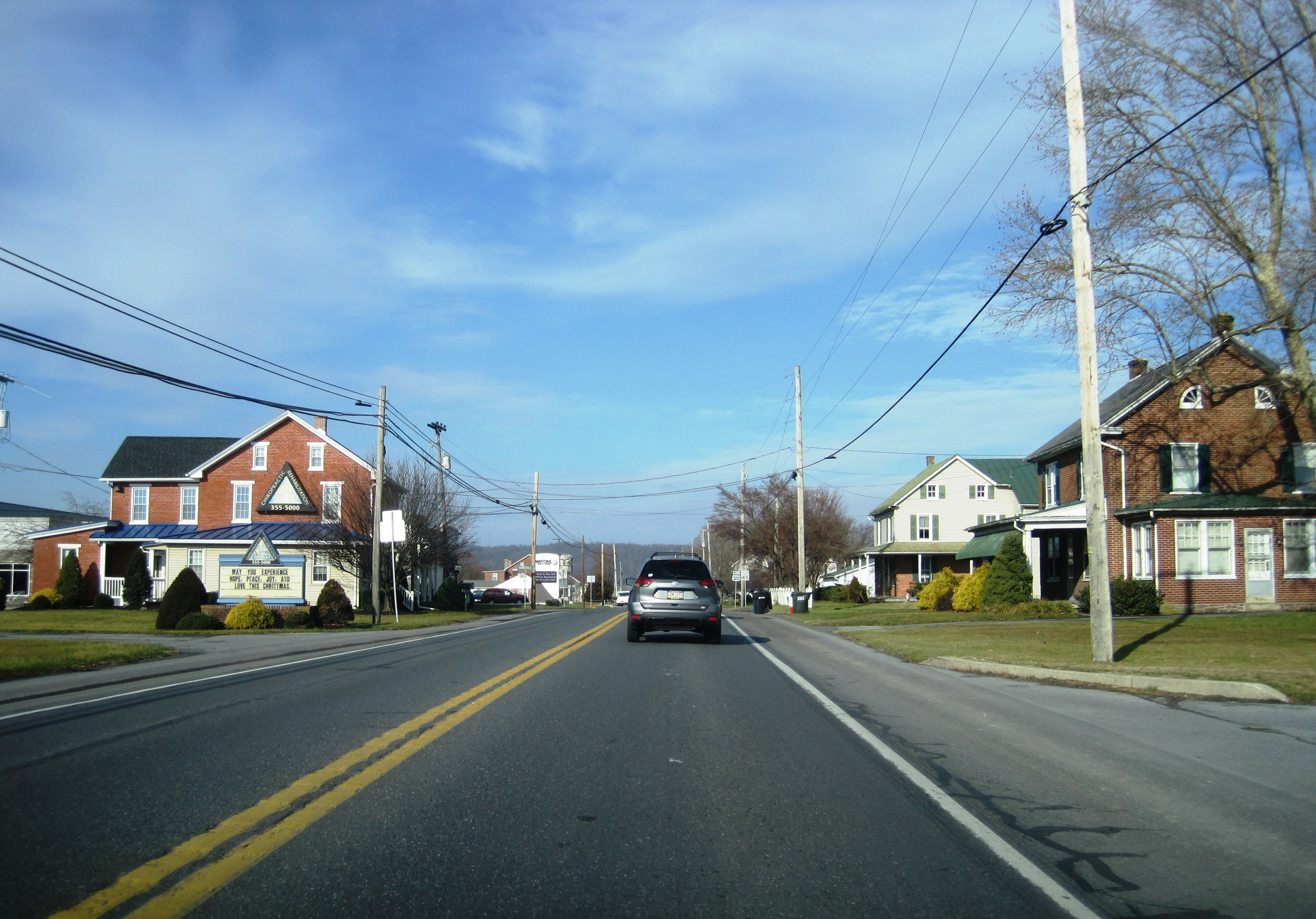
- US 322 westbound in Hinkletown

- Location within Pennsylvania Location within the United States
- Coordinates: 40°8′53″N 76°7′18″W
- Country: United States
- State: Pennsylvania
- County: Lancaster
- Township: Earl
- Elevation: 371 ft (113 m)
- Time zone: UTC-5 (Eastern (EST))
  - Summer (DST): UTC-4 (EDT)
- GNIS feature ID: 1177137

Hinkletown (Pennsylvania German: Hinkelschteddel) is an unincorporated community located in Earl Township in Lancaster County, Pennsylvania, United States. Hinkletown is located along U.S. Route 322.

== Demographics ==
Historical population
Census	Pop.	Note	%±

The United States Census Bureau defined Hinkletown as a census designated place (CDP) in 2023.
