= Ludwig Denig =

American painter

Ludwig Denig (1755–1830) was an American folk artist.

A native of Lancaster, Pennsylvania, he became a member of the Reformed Church, whose congregational school he attended. He served in the American Revolution and worked as a shoemaker before, in 1787, moving to Chambersburg, Pennsylvania and taking up work as an apothecary. He died in Chambersburg.

Denig is remembered for a 200-page illuminated manuscript he produced in 1784. The book, filled with spiritual texts and sermons and illustrated in watercolor, contains mainly scenes from the New Testament, including images from the passion of Jesus and the martyrdoms of the apostles. Also incorporated into its pages are pictures of symbolic flowers and other items, as well as twenty hymns. The pages measure six-and-one-half by eight-and-one-half inches, and the whole is bound in leather. The book contains a family register recording births, marriages, and deaths; his own death was noted in the ledger by one of his children. Denig's illustrations depict their subjects dressed in the costume of contemporary Pennsylvania German people. They were painted when the fraktur tradition in Pennsylvania was at its height, and accordingly they bear its imprint, as well as the influence of Christian devotional prints and illustrated Bibles popular during the period. Theologically, the book contains moralistic texts and illustrations of sacrifice, reflective of the Pietism then in vogue among some members of the Pennsylvania German Community.

Denig's book was published in 1990 as The Picture-Bible of Ludwig Denig: A Pennsylvania German Emblem Book. At the time it was owned by Esther Ipp Schwartz, who had offered it to folklorist Don Yoder for study. Early in 2020, it was donated to the Winterthur Museum, Garden and Library.
