= New Boston, Pennsylvania =

Unincorporated community in Pennsylvania, US

- Census-designated place
- Location within Pennsylvania Location within the United States
- Coordinates: 40°47′49″N 76°9′9″W
- Country: United States
- State: Pennsylvania
- County: Schuylkill
- Township: Mahanoy

Area
  - Total: 0.14 sq mi (0.36 km^{2})
  - Land: 0.14 sq mi (0.36 km^{2})
  - Water: 0 sq mi (0.00 km^{2})
- Elevation: 1,560 ft (480 m)

Population (2020)
  - Total: 231
  - Density: 1,660.3/sq mi (641.04/km^{2})
- Time zone: UTC-5 (Eastern (EST))
  - Summer (DST): UTC-4 (EDT)
- ZIP Code: 17948
- Area codes: 570/272
- FIPS code: 42-53272
- GNIS feature ID: 2805585

New Boston is an unincorporated community and census-designated place (CDP) in Schuylkill County, Pennsylvania, United States. It was first listed as a CDP prior to the 2020 census. Before that, it was part of the New Boston-Morea CDP.

New Boston is in northern Schuylkill County, in the south part of Mahanoy Township. It sits at around 1,600 feet (490 m) above sea level in a high valley on top of Broad Mountain, which rises to an elevation over 1,760 feet (540 m) 1 mile (1.6 km) to the south.

Morea Road runs along the northern edge of the community, leading northeast 2 miles (3 km) to Mahanoy City and southwest 1 mile (1.6 km) to Morea and 4 miles (6 km) to Frackville. Interstate 81 passes south of New Boston, with access from exits near Frackville and Mahanoy City.

== Demographics ==
Historical population
Census	Pop.	Note	%±
2020	231		—
U.S. Decennial Census
