= Christian Alsdorff =

American artist

Christian Alsdorff (died 1838) was an American Fraktur artist.

Nothing is known of Alsdorff's origins, and no record of his birth has been discovered. For many years he was a schoolmaster; his name appeared in a history of Lancaster County, Pennsylvania, years after his death.

Alsdorff's earliest dated Fraktur is a piece made for a student in Earl Township in that county in December 1791. Evidence shows that his career took him to Montgomery and Dauphin Counties as well as Lancaster County, and later in life to Mifflin County as well. Stylistically his paintings indicate a familiarity with the work of the brothers Johann Adam and Johann Friedrich Eyer; in turn, his work influenced the art of Christian Strenge.

He also appears to have been aware of the work made at Ephrata Cloister. Much of Alsdorff's work was made for the Mennonites. It includes books of musical notation, religious texts, writing examples, bookplates, and presentation pieces, all related in some fashion to educational endeavors.

Five works attributed to Alsdorff, all originally from Earl Township, are in the collection of the Philadelphia Museum of Art.
