= Clear Spring Mill =

- U.S. National Register of Historic Places
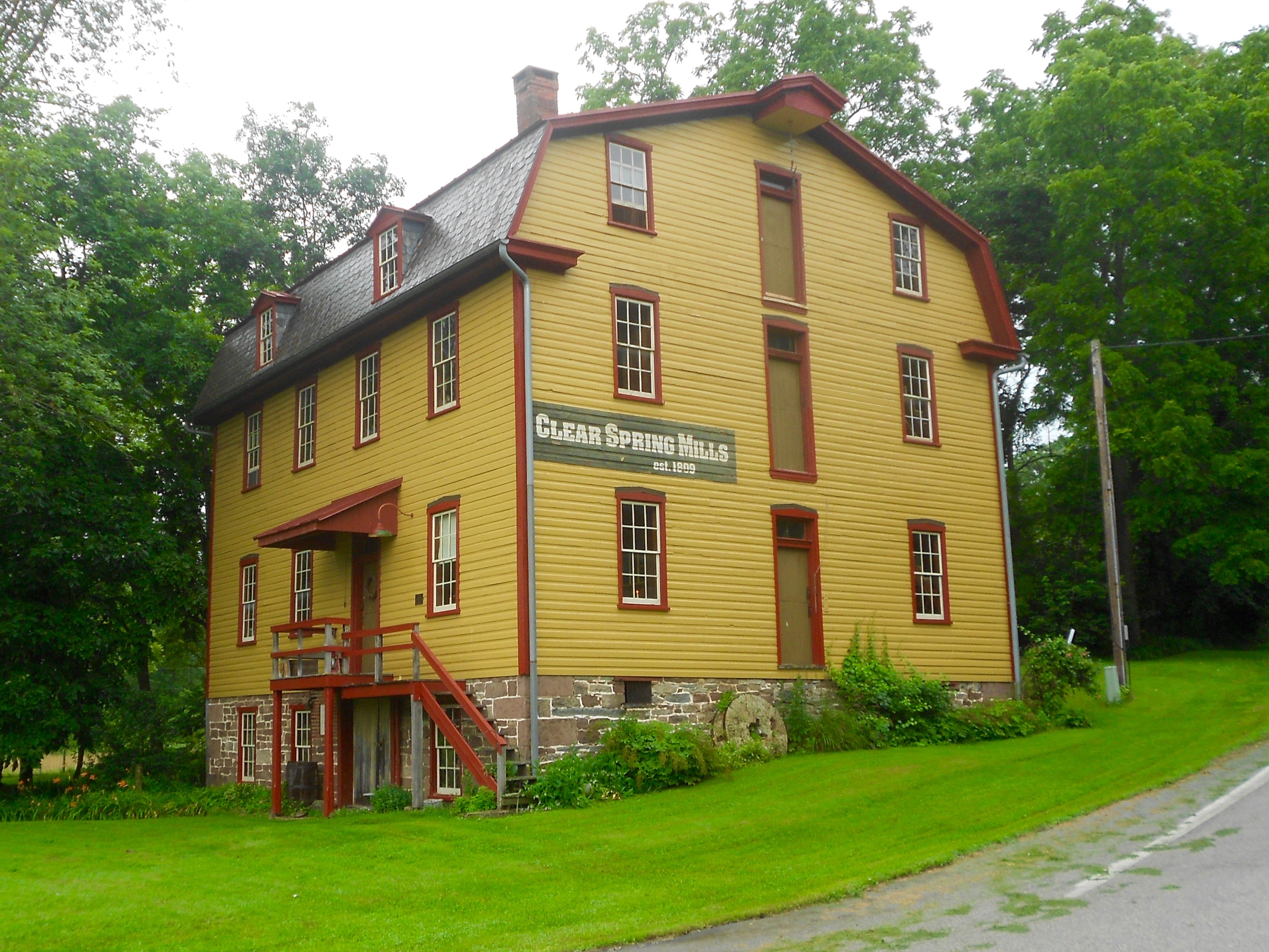

- Location within Pennsylvania Location within the United States
- Location: Western corner of the junction of Capitol Hill and Clear Spring Roads, south of Dillsburg, Franklin Township, Pennsylvania
- Coordinates: 40°3′25″N 77°3′53″W
- Area: 5.4 acres (2.2 ha)
- Built: 1886
- Architectural style: Late Victorian
- NRHP reference No.: 96001199
- Added to NRHP: November 4, 1996

Clear Spring Mill is a historic mill complex located at Franklin Township, York County, Pennsylvania. The complex includes the grist mill, sawmill, and corn crib. The grist mill was built in 1886, and is a 2 1/2-story, heavy timber frame building on a banked sandstone foundation. It has a gambrel roof and three interior levels. The sawmill was built about 1809, and is a one-story timber frame building on a foundation of banked stone, stone piers, and wood posts. It measures 12 feet deep by 40 feet wide, with a rear porch extension. The corncrib was built about 1930.

It was added to the National Register of Historic Places in 1997.
