= Ehre Vater Artist =

American painter

The Ehre Vater Artist was an American fraktur artist active in the late eighteenth and early nineteenth centuries.

Work by this artist has been traced in almost every county in Pennsylvania, Virginia, North Carolina, and Ontario that saw the settlement of German immigrants; it is the prolific nature of the artist's career that has made identification difficult, similar to the case of the Sussel-Washington Artist. Evidence suggests that the artist lived among the Moravians of Salem, North Carolina, but accepted patrons from among other religious groups, such as Roman Catholics, that practiced the baptism of infants. The artist's work includes aspects of Moravian hymnody, and evinces a particular skill in its cursive penmanship; it is also drawn on special paper with engraved scenes, unique in the work of known fraktur creators. The designs favored by this artist are bold, frequently geometric, and dominated by the use of green and red. Other common symbols include pilasters, used as portions of borers; large, geometric balls, sometimes surrounded by a piece of verse; and snakes twined with texts such as hymn lyrics. The name given to the artist comes from the German phrase meaning "honor father and mother", frequently found in pieces attributed to the painter.

Four pieces by the Ehre Vater Artist are in the collection of the Museum of Early Southern Decorative Arts. Other works are owned by the Abby Aldrich Rockefeller Folk Art Museum and the Winterthur Museum.
