= Francis Charles Portzline =

American painter

Francis Charles Portzline (1771 - 1857) was an American fraktur artist of German birth.

A native of Solingen, Portzline migrated to the United States in 1777, and settled in Franklin Township, York County, Pennsylvania, around 1800. There he operated a general store; its account book still exists in the hands of his descendants. He married Sabina Heiges, a member of a local family, and is believed to have been a schoolteacher at the Franklin Church. Achieving American citizenship in 1804, in 1812 he sold his York County property and moved to Perry County; some years later he moved again, to Snyder County, which would be his home until his death. His property was located along the Susquehanna River, in Perry Township, at the time part of Union County. While living there he continued to farm and teach. The Portzline family cemetery, containing the artist's grave, still exists in Perry Township.

As an artist Portzline is remembered today for a handful of baptismal records for children in the neighborhood, distinguished by their border designs of brightly colored animals. His work incorporates both German and English. Several pieces, primarily certificates for his own children, are known to survive. Six of his pieces are held by the Philadelphia Museum of Art; other collections holding examples of his work include those of the Winterthur Museum, which owns three works; the Abby Aldrich Rockefeller Folk Art Museum, which owns two; and the Free Library of Philadelphia, which owns one, as does the Hood Museum of Art at Dartmouth College. He was among the folk artists featured in an exhibit at the Museum of Modern Art in 1932 and 1933.
