= Jacob Strickler =

American painter

Jacob Strickler (1770 – June 24, 1842) was an American fraktur artist.

Strickler was born in the community of Massanutten, Virginia, in a portion of Shenandoah County which later became part of Page County. He was descended from the company of Mennonites who had moved to the region from Lancaster County, Pennsylvania by 1733. Evidence suggests that he was a Mennonite preacher and schoolteacher in addition to creating fraktur. His earliest surviving work, dated 1787, already reveals him to be an accomplished calligrapher with his own distinctive personal vocabulary of symbols, including inverted hearts with flowers at their tips, sawtooth patterns, and comma-shaped serifs. Nearly a dozen surviving pieces, dating from 1787 to 1815, are known, including two birth records; two writing exercises; three uncolored practice designs; two religious allegories; a third, secular writing exercise; and another small drawing. These last two bear motifs reminiscent of those found on a tall-case clock made by a neighbor and relative, Johannes Spitler. The nature of Strickler's training is unknown, but his work bears certain similarities to that by more prolific fraktur artists from Pennsylvania, such as Daniel Schumacher. He evinced great confidence in his own work, in 1794 writing: "the paper is my field and the pen is my plow. This is why I am so clever. The ink is my seed with which I write my name." At his death Strickler was interred in the family cemetery on his property.

Several works by, or attributed to, Strickler are held by the Abby Aldrich Rockefeller Folk Art Museum. Another piece is in the collection of the Winterthur Museum; one is also owned by the American Folk Art Museum.
