= Bachmanville, Pennsylvania =

Unincorporated community in Pennsylvania, US

- Unincorporated community
- Location within Pennsylvania
- Coordinates: 40°24′30″N 76°40′5″W
- Country: United States
- State: Pennsylvania
- County: Dauphin
- Township: Conewago
- Elevation: 607 ft (185 m)
- Time zone: UTC-5 (Eastern (EST))
  - Summer (DST): UTC-4 (EDT)
- Area code: 717

Bachmanville is an unincorporated community in northeastern Conewago Township, Dauphin County, Pennsylvania, United States and is part of the Harrisburg-Carlisle Metropolitan Statistical Area.

Bachmanville was named for a family of settlers.
