= Johannes Bard =

American painter

Johannes (sometimes John) Bard (1797–1861) was an American fraktur artist.

A blacksmith by trade, Bard was also a lay leader in the German Methodist Church; he passed his career in Adams and York Counties, Pennsylvania, and Frederick County, Maryland. He is among the most prolific fraktur artists known to have lived or worked in York County, alongside Daniel Peterman. A large portion of his work consists of copies of baptismal certificates published by a printer in Hanover, Pennsylvania. It has been posited that he was a pupil of George Peter Deisert. Unusually, some of his pieces incorporate American symbols and themes into their decorative schemes. Others depict prominent figures, including American presidents. Many examples of Bard's work, mainly writing samples but including other pieces as well, can be found in the collection of the Winterthur Museum.
