= Christian Strenge =

American painter

Johann Christian Strenge
- Born: October 24, 1757; Altenhasungen, Hesse-Kassel, Holy Roman Empire (modern-day Germany)
- Died: 1825 (aged 67–68) East Petersburg, Pennsylvania, U.S.
- Allegiance: Hesse-Kassel
- Branch: Hessian Mercenaries
- Service years: 1776–1783
- Conflicts: American Revolutionary War; Battle of Trenton (POW)
- Spouses: unnamed spouse (died c. early-mid 1780s) unnamed spouse (c. late 1780s)
- Children: 6
- Other work: Artist

Johann Christian Strenge (October 24, 1757 – 1825) was a German-born American fraktur artist.

The only son of Johann Henrich Strenge and his wife, Maria Catharina Romer, Strenge was a native of the village of Altenhasungen in Hesse. He became one of many Hessians who served the British crown in the American Revolution, Strenge enlisted in 1776 and, under the command of Johann Rall, arrived in New York in August of that year. Taken prisoner in the aftermath of the Battle of Trenton, he was later released to the British. By the time his military unit had been discharged in 1783, he had deserted. He moved to Hempfield in Lancaster County, Pennsylvania; he married and had a daughter, but both wife and child died. With his second wife he would have five children. The family moved in the 1790s to East Petersburg, Pennsylvania, where he began a teaching career; he taught at least one term in Chester County as well. He worked as a scrivener as well, and in 1811 was named justice of the peace.

Although he himself had been baptized in the Reformed Church, Stenge was a schoolmaster for the Mennonite community, which informed the style of his fraktur; he produced writing samples, family records, Bible entries, bookplates, and a variety of presentation pieces. From Christian Alsdorff he learned the tradition of making books of musical notation. He also made baptismal records for Lutheran and Reformed neighbors. His presentation pieces incorporate symbols such as birds and hearts, as well as sayings. Strenge also produced complex love letters designed for young men to give to young women; also surviving is an image of the Crucifixion. His paintings are distinguished by their color scheme, incorporating bright oranges and reds. One of Strenge's love letters is held by the American Folk Art Museum. Three pieces are in the collection of the Winterthur Museum.
