= Cross-Legged Angel Artist =

The Cross-Legged Angel Artist (Southeastern Pennsylvania, active c. 1791-1815) was an anonymous American fraktur artist.

The artist's name is derived from the repeated use of an angel with crossed legs as a decorative element in their work; similar figures are encountered in Baroque church decoration in Europe from the eighteenth century and earlier. The artist's handwriting was poor, judging by surviving certificates, some of which were printed before being completed by hand. Surviving pieces suggest the artist was active in northeastern Lancaster County, Pennsylvania and adjoining Berks County, and it has been posited that the artist was a schoolteacher in the area. Other symbols prevalent in the artist's paintings include birds posed on the shoulders of figures depicted.

Work by the Cross-Legged Angel Artist may be found in the collections of the Reading Public Museum and Franklin and Marshall College.
