= Morea, Pennsylvania =

Unincorporated community in Pennsylvania, US

- Census-designated place
- Location within Pennsylvania Location within the United States
- Coordinates: 40°47′22″N 76°10′18″W
- Country: United States
- State: Pennsylvania
- County: Schuylkill
- Township: Mahanoy

Area
  - Total: 0.17 sq mi (0.43 km^{2})
  - Land: 0.17 sq mi (0.43 km^{2})
  - Water: 0 sq mi (0.00 km^{2})
- Elevation: 1,510 ft (460 m)

Population (2020)
  - Total: 200
  - Density: 1,207/sq mi (466.2/km^{2})
- Time zone: UTC-5 (Eastern (EST))
  - Summer (DST): UTC-4 (EDT)
- ZIP Code: 17948
- Area codes: 570/272
- FIPS code: 42-50924
- GNIS feature ID: 2805582

Morea is an unincorporated community and census-designated place (CDP) in Schuylkill County, Pennsylvania, United States. It was first listed as a CDP prior to the 2020 census. Before that, it was part of the New Boston-Morea CDP.

Morea is in northern Schuylkill County, in the southwestern part of Mahanoy Township. It sits at 1,500 feet (460 m) above sea level in a high valley on top of Broad Mountain, which rises to an elevation over 1,760 feet (540 m) approximately 1 mile (1.6 km) to the east.

Morea Road follows the northern edge of the community, leading northeast 1 mile (1.6 km) to New Boston and 3 miles (5 km) to Mahanoy City. To the southwest, Morea Road leads 3.5 miles (5.6 km) to Frackville. Interstate 81 passes just south of Morea, with access from exits near Frackville and Mahanoy City.

== Demographics ==
Historical population
Census	Pop.	Note	%±
2020	200		—
U.S. Decennial Census
