= Johann Jacob Friedrich Krebs =

American painter

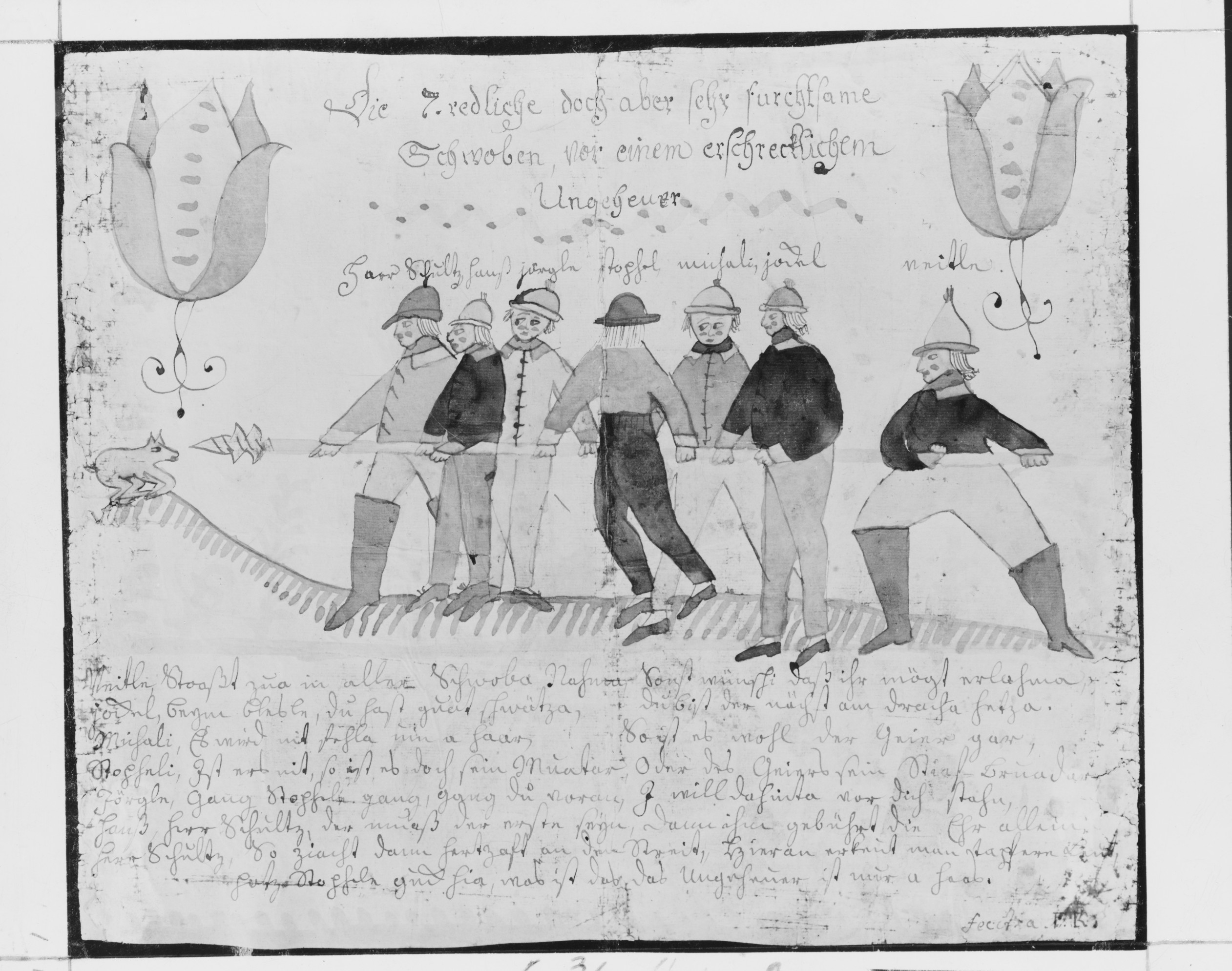
"Drawing of a Hunt" by Friedrich Krebs

Johann Jacob Friedrich Krebs, commonly known as Friedrich Krebs (c. 1749–1815) was an American fraktur artist. He was the most prolific of the Pennsylvania German fraktur artists.

Born in Zierenberg, Hesse, Krebs was one of the Hessians who fought under the British crown during the American Revolutionary War. It has been reported that he returned to Germany, but this is uncertain, and it seems more likely that he remained in the United States at the conclusion of the war. In 1787 he established a business purchasing pre-printed baptismal records which he would then further embellish for sale; eventually he had forms of his own printed, many in Reading, Pennsylvania. He also painted many handmade examples. The majority of his work consists of baptismal certificates, but he produced many other pieces as well. These include drawings of various sacred and secular subjects; broadsides of Adam and Eve, used as marriage certificates; mazes; a clock face; and handboxes. During his career he was also active as a Lutheran schoolmaster in the vicinity of Harrisburg, Pennsylvania. He died in Dauphin County, in Swatara Township, leaving behind hundreds of blank forms for his executors to sell, as well as others that he had himself decorated.

Examples of frakturs by or attributed to Krebs may be found in the collections of the Metropolitan Museum of Art, the Museum of Fine Arts, Boston; the Museum of Fine Arts, Houston; the Philadelphia Museum of Art; the Winterthur Museum; the Library of Congress; and the Phillips Museum of Art at Franklin and Marshall College.
