= George Heinrich Engellhard =

American painter

George Heinrich Engellhard was an American fraktur artist. His name is sometimes given as George Hennerich Engelhard.

Engellhard is recorded as a member of the Lutheran congregation at New Holland, Pennsylvania, in 1805. Several of his existing works were painted for families in the vicinity of Schwaben Creek in Northumberland County; one of these, for Johannes Braun, is dated 1818. In that same year the artist married in the Tulpehocken region of Pennsylvania, whereupon he relocated to Bethel in Berks County, where he took up a post as schoolmaster for the Salem Church. He and his wife would become the parents of six. For many years Engellhard was known as the "Haus-Segen Artist", but in 1973 a signed example of his work was discovered. He painted house blessings, bookplates, baptismal certificates, and presentation drawings. More unusual works include a depiction of a mouthless girl and a picture of a boy singing; the latter is captioned, in both Italian and German, "I sing in a beautiful way to the Lord."

Engellhard's drawing of a singing boy is owned by the Winterthur Museum. Other works are owned by Franklin and Marshall College.
