= Johann Henrich Otto =

American fraktur artist

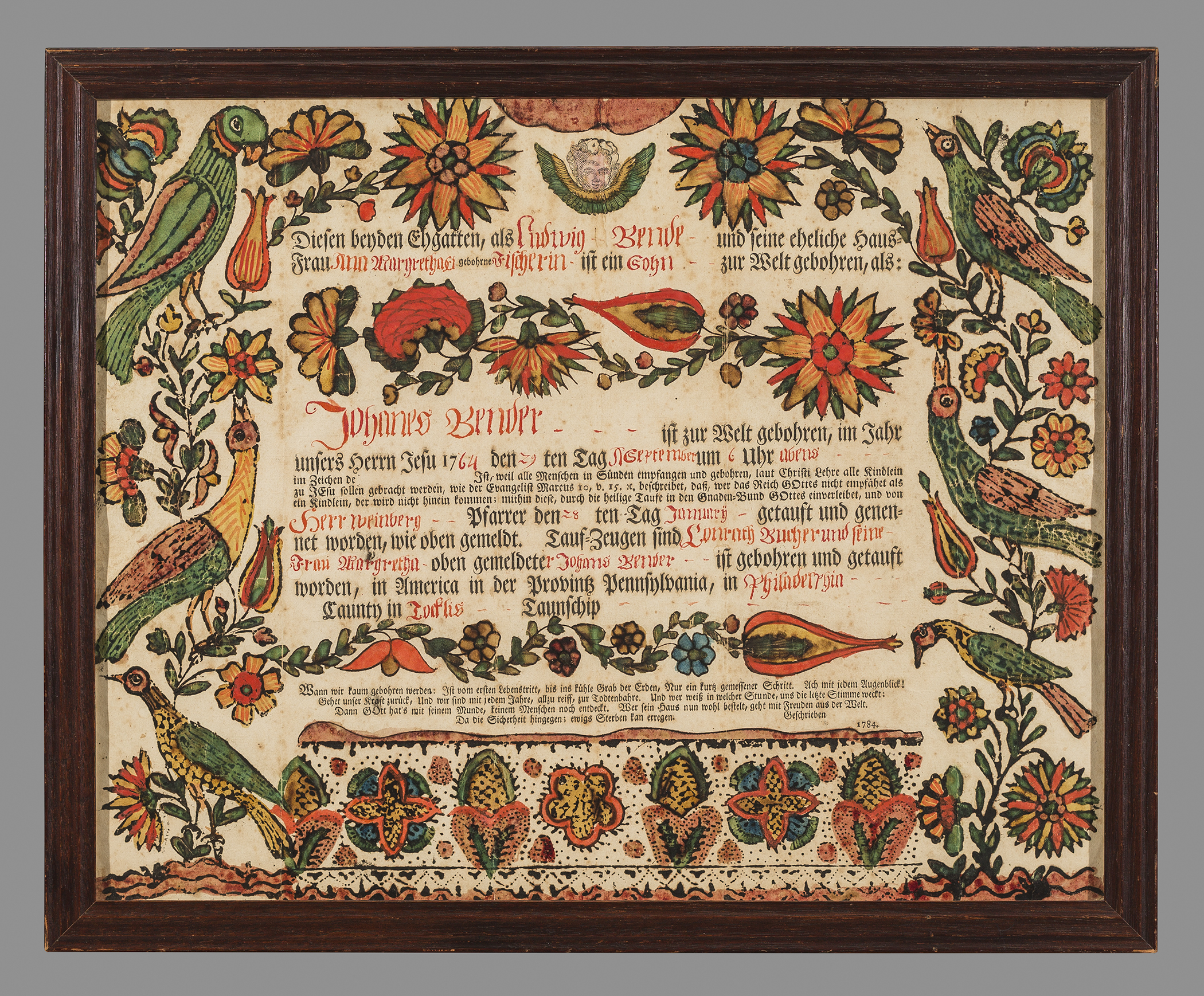
Fraktur birth and baptismal certificate (Geburts und Taufschein) of Johanes Bender, in the collection of the Winterthur Museum

Johann Henrich (sometimes Heinrich) Otto (1733 - c. 1800) was an American fraktur artist.

Otto came to the Thirteen Colonies as a young man, arriving aboard the ship Edinburgh on October 2, 1753, his age given as 20 years. He was possibly a native of Schwarzerden, at that time in the parish of Pfeffelbach in the Western Palatinate, for one Joh. Henrich Otto was born there on February 5, 1733. He married Anna Catharine Dauterich; their children were born in Lancaster and Montgomery Counties in Pennsylvania. Beginning in 1755 he advertised himself as a weaver. From 1777 until 1780 he saw military service in the American Revolutionary War. He appears to have worked as a schoolmaster for numerous Reformed Protestant churches; from around 1769 until 1779 he was associated with an institution in Schaefferstown, Pennsylvania, and later he lived in Mahanoy Township, then in Northumberland County, where he likely taught at St. Peter's Lutheran and Reformed Church. Otto began producing fraktur in the 1760s; he was among the first artists to create birth certificates using the style. His earliest pieces are completely hand-drawn, very colorful and detailed. By 1784 he was having baptismal certificates printed at the press of the Ephrata Cloister; the woodblocks used to decorate the pieces may have been designed by him as well. Some of them contain longer certificates which appear to justify infant baptism, a practice generally disdained by Mennonites in the area. Otto also created broadsides featuring Adam and Eve during his career, as well as spiritual mazes, bookplates, and presentation pieces. The birds that he drew were later copied by other artists, who also borrowed the style of his text. His four sons, Jacob, William, Daniel, and Conrad became fraktur artists, as did Conrad's son Peter. Johann Otto died in Mahanoy Township.

Five works either known to be by Otto or ascribed to him are in the collection of the Metropolitan Museum of Art. Five more are owned by the Winterthur Museum, while four are in the collection of the Museum of Fine Arts, Boston. Six are held by the Phillips Museum of Art at Franklin & Marshall College.
