= Fraktur (folk art) =

Illuminated folk art from Pennsylvania

- Geographical indication
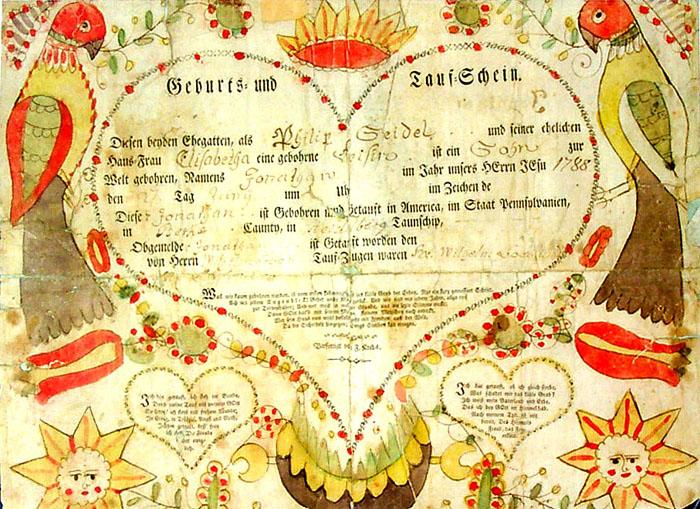
- An ornate Taufschein, or baptismal certificate
- Description: Highly artistic and elaborate illuminated folk art
- Type: Folk art
- Area: Pennsylviania
- Country: United States

Fraktur is a highly artistic and elaborate illustrated folk art created by the Pennsylvania Dutch, named after the Fraktur script associated with it. Place of creation also includes Alsace, Switzerland, and the Rhineland which also contributed to the folk art. Most Fraktur were created between 1740 and 1860.

Fraktur drawings were executed in ink and/or watercolors and are found in a wide variety of forms: the Vorschriften (writing samples), the Taufzettle (baptismal certificate), and the Taufpatenbreif (Baptism letter from Godparents), book plates, and floral and figurative scenes. The earlier Fraktur were executed entirely by hand, while printed text became increasingly common in later examples. Common artistic motifs in Fraktur include birds (distelfinks), hearts, and tulips, as well as blackletter (Fraktur) and italic calligraphy.

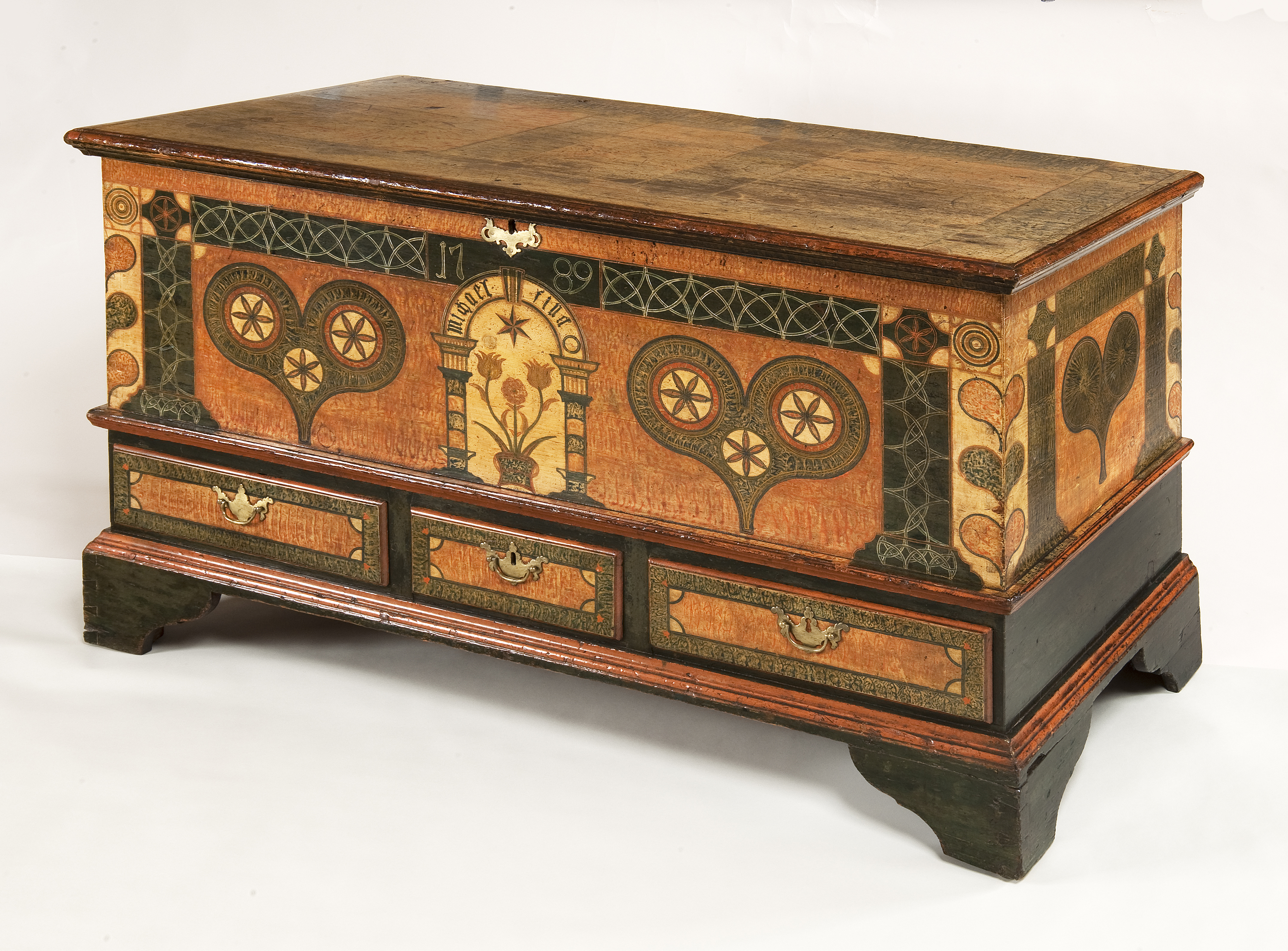
This 1789 Pennsylvania German chest of drawers show many of the traditional forms that are used in fraktur

Many major American museums, including the American Folk Art Museum, the Metropolitan Museum of Art, the Philadelphia Museum of Art, the Mercer Museum, and the Winterthur Museum have Fraktur in their collections. Important Fraktur have been sold by major American auction houses and antique dealers for prices in excess of $100,000. The definitive text on Fraktur is widely considered to be The Fraktur-Writings or Illuminated Manuscripts of the Pennsylvania Germans, written by Dr. Donald A. Shelley and published by the Pennsylvania German Society in 1961. In late 2004, the majority of Dr. Shelley's Fraktur collection was sold at public auction at Pook & Pook, Inc. in Downingtown, Pennsylvania, for $913,448.

== Notable artists ==
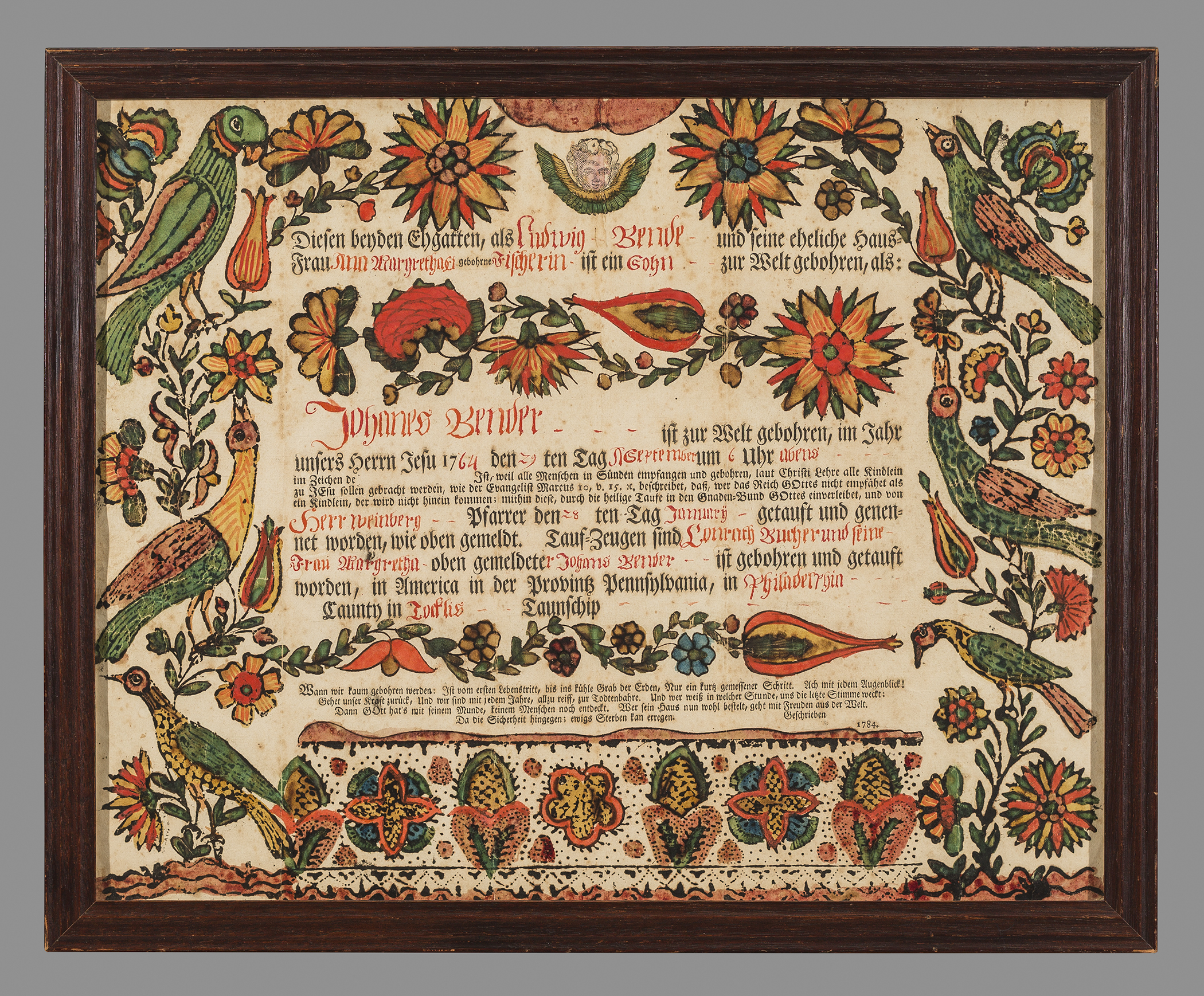
Fraktur birth and baptismal certificate (Geburts und Taufschein) of Johanes Bender by Johann Heinrich Otto

Notable fraktur artists within the Pennsylvania German community include:

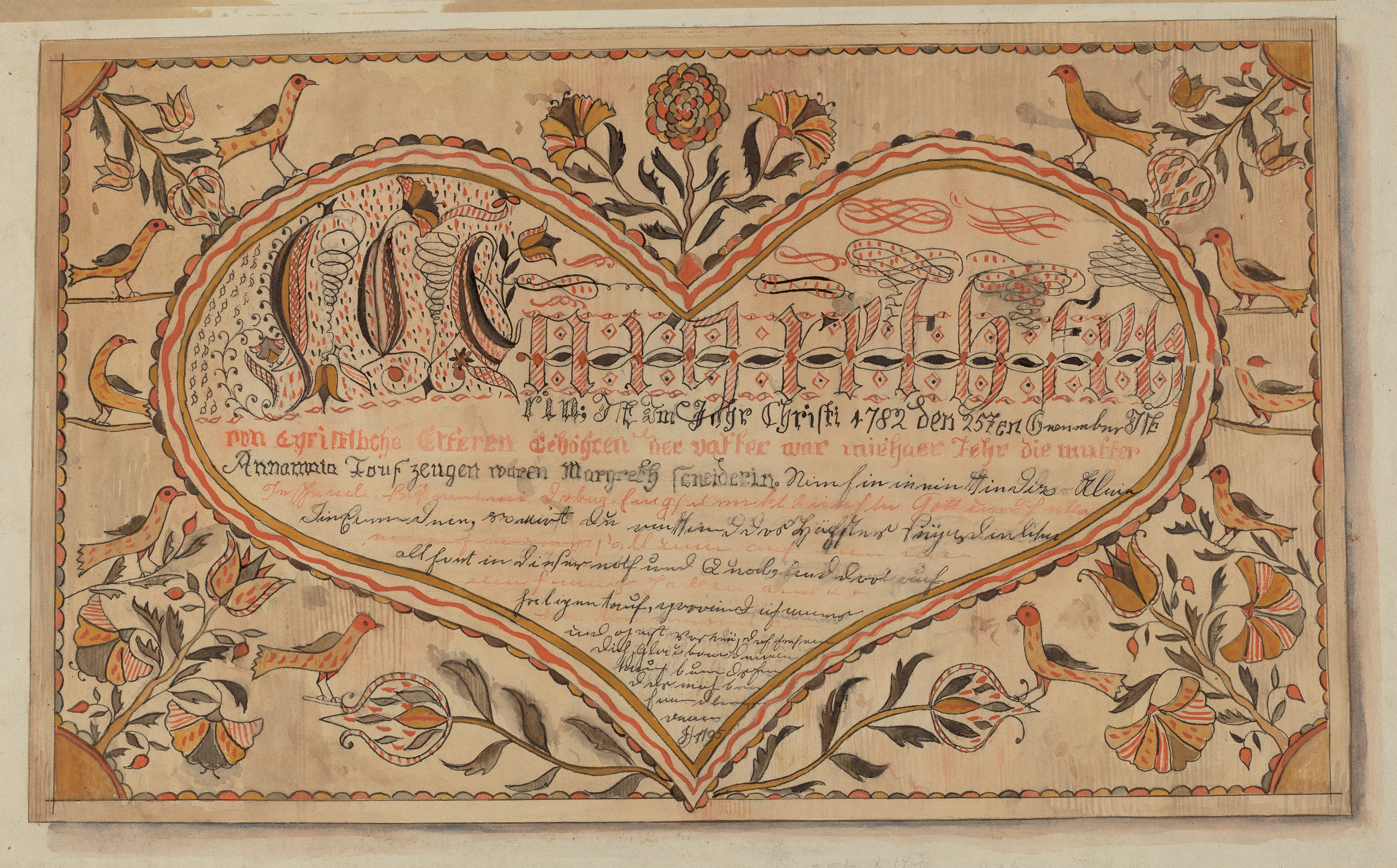
Fraktur Christening Certificate, c. 1936, by Ella Josephine Sterling, Index of American Design. Image from the National Gallery of Art

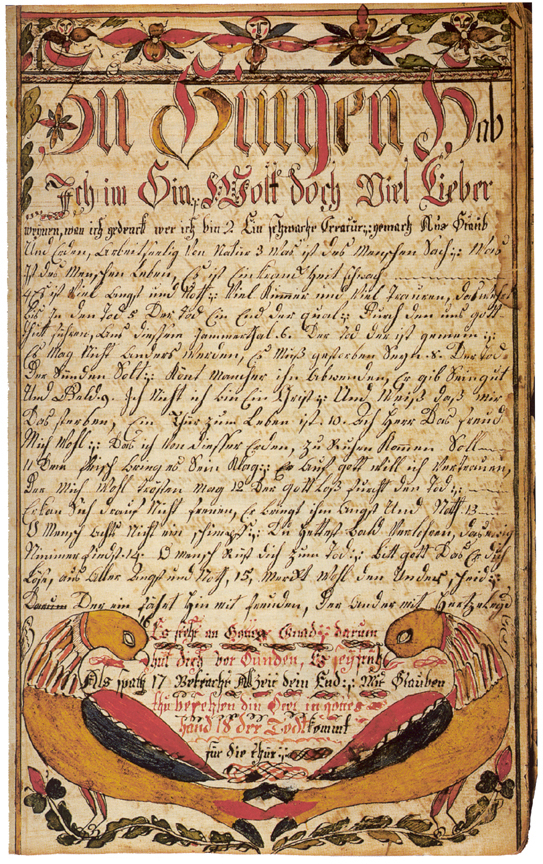
A religious poem produced in Bucks County, PA in 1785

- Christian Alsdorff
- Johannes Bard
- Samuel Bentz
- Martin Brechall
- George Peter Deisert
- George Heinrich Engellhard
- Johann Adam Eyer
- Johann Conrad Gilbert
- Samuel Gottschall
- Johann Jacob Friedrich Krebs
- Christian Mertel
- Conrad Trevitz
- Daniel Otto
- Johann Henrich Otto
- Daniel Peterman
- Francis Charles Portzline
- Daniel Schumacher
- Johannes Ernst Spangenberg
- Christian Strenge
- John Van Minian

Other artists of note include Jacob Strickler, from the Shenandoah Valley of Virginia, and Anna Weber, an Ontario resident and one of a few fraktur artists active in Canada. Anonymous artists whose work is recognized include the Cross-Legged Angel Artist, the Ehre Vater Artist, and the Sussel-Washington Artist. Stylistically related work was produced by Ludwig Denig.

== See also ==
Other notable artists include Roma Ruth of Harleysville, Pennsylvania.

- Hex sign
