= Pennsylvania Route 863 =

State highway in Lehigh County, Pennsylvania, US

Pennsylvania Route 863

Route information
- Maintained by PennDOT
- Length: 13.988 mi (22.512 km)
- Existed: March 8, 1962–present

Major junctions
- South end: US 222 in Upper Macungie Township
- I-78 / US 22 in Weisenberg Township
- North end: PA 143 in Lynnport

Location
- Country: United States
- State: Pennsylvania
- Counties: Lehigh

Highway system
- Pennsylvania State Route System; Interstate; US; State; Scenic; Legislative
← PA 862	→ PA 864

Pennsylvania Route 863 (PA 863) is a state highway in Lehigh County, Pennsylvania, in the Lehigh Valley region of the state. The route runs 13.99 mi (22.51 km) from U.S. Route 222 (US 222) in Upper Macungie Township north to PA 143 in Lynnport in Lynn Township. The route is a two-lane undivided road that runs southeast–northwest through rural areas in western Lehigh County. Along the way, PA 863 has an interchange with Interstate 78 (I-78)/US 22 in Weisenberg Township.

The road, which was originally unpaved, was turned into a bituminous road in the 1940s and a paved road by 1950. It was designated PA Route 863 on March 8, 1962.

== Route description ==
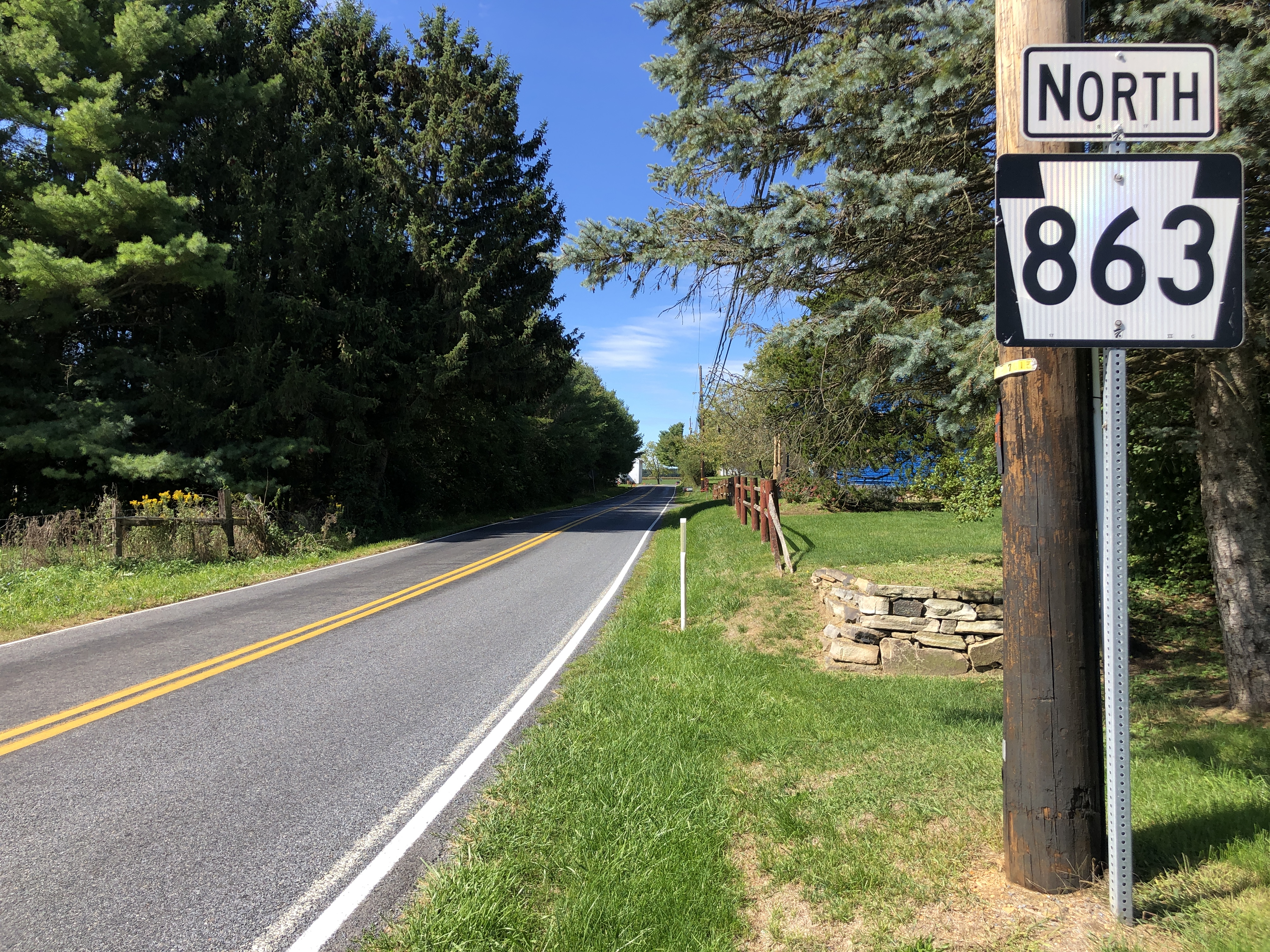
PA 863 northbound in Lynn Township

PA 863 begins at a roundabout intersection with US 222 in Upper Macungie Township, Lehigh County, which is in the Lehigh Valley. It uses two-lane undivided Independent Road after turning left off Schantz Road immediately north of the roundabout and heads northwest through agricultural areas with some trees and homes, entering Weisenberg Township. The route winds through wooded areas and curves to the west, turning north as it passes more farms. PA 863 crosses Old Route 22 and becomes Golden Key Road, passing businesses as it intersects I-78/US 22 at a diamond interchange. The road continues through commercial areas and passes to the east of a few warehouses, heading through an S-curve.

The route passes through Hynemansville and runs northwest through a mix of farms, woods, and residences. PA 863 heads through Seiberlingville and continues northwest through agricultural areas with some woods and homes. The route heads west into Lynn Township and passes through Stines Corner before it winds north through wooded areas. The road heads west by farms before it turns north and crosses Kistler Creek, winding through forested areas with some fields. The route turns east onto Allemaengel Road and curves north into farmland. Allemaengel Road splits to the east and PA 863 continues north along Behler Road, crossing Ontelaunee Creek before coming to Lynnport, where it ends at PA 143.

== History ==
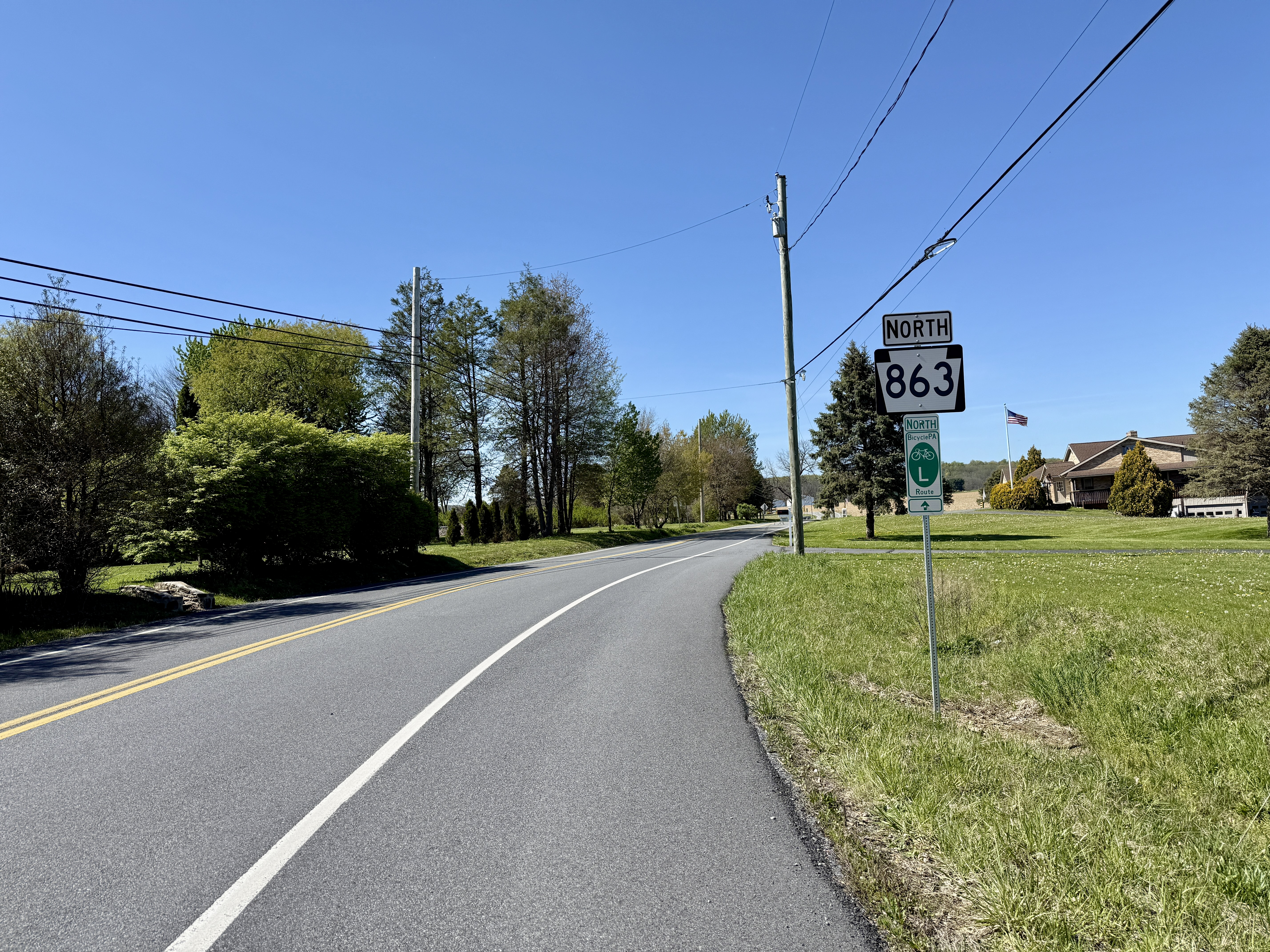
PA 863 northbound in Upper Macungie Township

When Pennsylvania first legislated routes in 1911, present-day PA 863 was not legislated as part of a route. The present route of PA 863 existed as an unpaved road by 1915. By 1941, the road was a low-type bituminous road between US 222 and Kistler Valley Road and a high-type bituminous road between Kistler Valley Road and PA 143. By 1950, this roadway was paved. PA 863 was designated on March 8, 1962, to follow its current alignment between US 222 and PA 143. The route was created in order to provide a route number at the interchange with I-78/US 22 near New Smithville. The route has remained on the same alignment since.

== Major intersections ==
The entire route is in Lehigh County.

Location	mi	km	Destinations	Notes
Upper Macungie Township	0.000	0.000	US 222 (Hamilton Boulevard) – Allentown, Reading	Roundabout; southern terminus
Weisenberg Township	3.444	5.543	I-78 / US 22 – Harrisburg, Allentown	Exit 45 (I-78/US 22)
Lynn Township	13.988	22.512	PA 143 (Kings Highway) – Lenhartsville, New Tripoli	Northern terminus
1.000 mi = 1.609 km; 1.000 km = 0.621 mi

== See also ==
- Pennsylvania Route 737, a route that parallels PA 863 to the west
