= Trexler Historic District =

Historic district in Pennsylvania, United States

- U.S. National Register of Historic Places
- U.S. Historic district
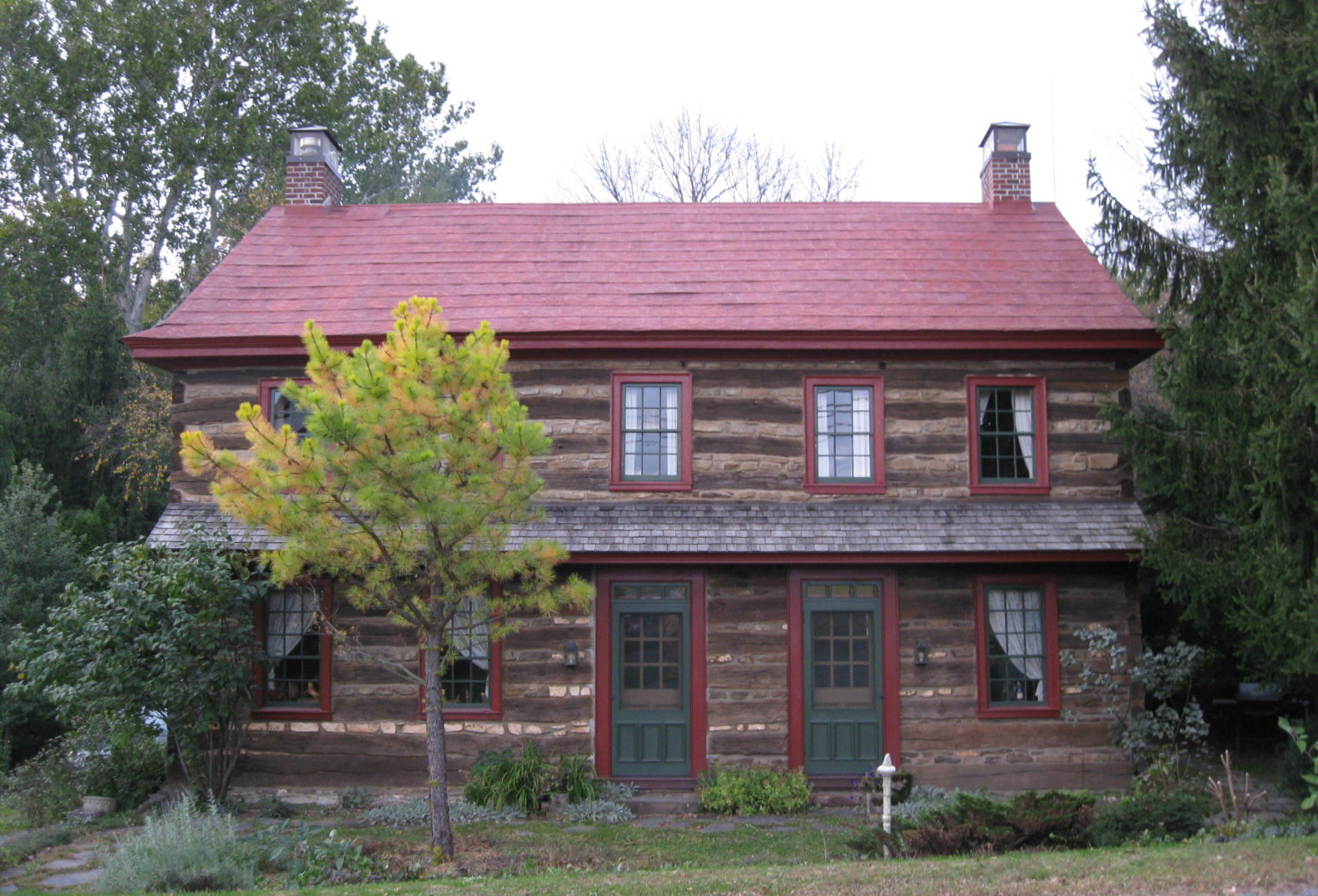
- Ritter House (1790), October 2009

- Location within Pennsylvania Location within the United States
- Location: 375–424 Old Philadelphia Pike, Albany Township, Pennsylvania
- Coordinates: 40°38′9″N 75°51′12″W
- Area: 8 acres (3.2 ha)
- Built: 1863
- Architectural style: Georgian, Colonial Revival, et al.
- NRHP reference No.: 01000957
- Added to NRHP: September 7, 2001

The Trexler Historic District, also known as Trexler Station, is a national historic district located in Albany Township, Berks County, Pennsylvania. The district encompasses 8 acres (3.2 ha) along Old Philadelphia Pike (Old Philly Pike) and contains fifteen contributing buildings representing the architectural history of a small commercial center from 1790 to 1930. The village progressed from a single farmstead to a commercial center serving the surrounding agricultural community before declining with the rise of automobile transportation. It was listed on the National Register of Historic Places on September 7, 2001.

== History ==
=== Early settlement ===
The Ritter family was one of the first European families to settle in Albany Township. In 1733, Richard and Thomas Penn issued the family a land grant for 301 acres along the Ontelaunee Creek. After 1750, a road was built roughly parallel to Pine Creek, crossing the Ontelaunee at the Ritter farm. This road, now known as Old Philly Pike, forded the creek behind the Ritter house, leading to the property's use as a stagecoach stop. Combined with an early mill established along the creek, the farmstead became a local center of commerce. In 1841, a three-arch stone bridge was constructed over the Ontelaunee to replace the ford.

=== Founding and growth ===
By 1857, Joel Kistler owned the former Ritter farm and opened a tannery adjacent to the mill. The village of Trexler was founded in 1863 when Nathan Trexler purchased the Henry Kerper and Company Tannery and relocated its operation to the site along the Ontelaunee. Nathan and his younger brother Amos became partners in the tannery and mill for the next thirty years until the tannery closed in 1892. Nathan lived in the log house and operated a general store in one of its front rooms, while Amos and his family lived in the small frame house.

The village economy boomed in 1874 with the establishment of the Lehigh and Schuylkill branch of the Reading Railroad. Amos Trexler, who ran a business selling coal, grain, lime, feed, sand, and other agricultural and building supplies to local farmers, helped bring the railroad to Trexler by organizing local farmers to fund the continuation of railroad construction through Albany Township. A freight depot was constructed in front of the Pennsylvania barn; it was primarily used for freight and mail, though local passengers also used it, including workers commuting to the rail yards in Reading. The 1876 township map shows the village with a hotel (the inn in the log house), the railroad depot, the J.D. Trexler store and post office, and the mill and tannery complex.

Between 1874 and 1930, the Trexler family businesses prospered. Amos built a new two-and-a-half-story frame house across the road in 1886. Nathan built a new home on the north side of the railroad for his family and another for tenants. By 1890, the brothers had erected the General Store building. They also operated the Washington Inn in the log house. Agriculture became more specialized, and in 1917 Amos built a new warehouse facility to store grain and potatoes grown by local farmers before shipment. Potatoes were a major cash crop, and the combined stations in Albany Township loaded as many as thirteen railroad cars of potatoes for shipment to cities along the East Coast.

=== Decline ===
The construction of improved roads, including State Route 143 to the west of the district, in the late 1920s and early 1930s contributed to decreased use of Old Philly Pike. Large trucks using the new roads could pick up loads directly from farmers, making the storage facility in Trexler increasingly unnecessary. In 1929, Albert Trexler began a business in the family warehouse adapting manual potato seed cutters to electric operation, selling 250 machines to farmers across the northeastern United States in his first year. However, the bank collapse the following year caused the Trexler family to lose some real estate holdings to mortgage foreclosures.

By the time of the Great Depression, Albert Trexler's was the only business remaining in the village. The tannery buildings, which had ceased operation in 1892, were demolished around 1920. The cider mill went out of use at the turn of the twentieth century. When the Trexler brothers declined to initiate the new rural delivery system in the late 1930s, the post office was transferred from the Trexler Store to nearby Kempton, and the General Store closed permanently. The Lehigh and Schuylkill railroad line was disbanded in the late 1950s, and the section of track through Trexler began being used by the Wanamaker, Kempton and Southern tourist railroad in 1962. At the turn of the twenty-first century, Trexler was a strictly residential community with no active businesses.

== Architectural features ==
The district contains fifteen contributing buildings erected between 1790 and 1930, arranged in a roadside alignment typical of rural villages in Berks County. The buildings illustrate the materials, design, and workmanship of northern Berks County homes and businesses from the colonial period through the Great Depression.

Notable buildings in the district include:

- Ritter House (1790) – An unusually large, three-story log structure built in the Georgian style, it retains many original exterior and interior features. A kitchen addition was constructed in 1813 when the building was converted to a public house and hotel, known as the Washington Inn. The building later housed a store and post office. It was used for storage from 1930 until being converted back to a single-family residence in the 1970s, when a two-story addition was built.
- Log house (c. 1800) – A one-and-one-half-story log house
- Cider mill (c. 1850) – A former cider press that operated from approximately 1830 to 1970, powered by a mill race
- Nathan Trexler House (1875)
- Amos Trexler House (1886) – A two-and-a-half-story frame house
- Trexler General Store (1890) – An intact example of a community store retaining decorative elements inside and out
- Grain and Feed Warehouse (1917) – A three-story frame storage building whose first floor was devoted to potatoes and whose second floor held different types of grain in bins; it now serves as the headquarters of the Albany Township Historical Society

The Late Victorian–style homes in the district demonstrate the continued popularity of Victorian design elements in rural Pennsylvania long after they had fallen out of favor in more urban areas. The district also includes a Pennsylvania Dutch bank barn constructed in the early 1800s. Also located in the district is the separately listed Bridge in Albany Township, a three-arch stone bridge built in 1841.

== Context ==
The Trexler Historic District illustrates a pattern common to small commercial centers in Berks County during the eighteenth and nineteenth centuries. Commerce in colonial times was generally conducted along the few existing roads at sites where water was available to power mills. The introduction of railroads generated commercial centers around depots collecting surplus produce for shipment to distant markets. When trucks and automobiles became the dominant form of transport, commercial activity shifted to major highways, bypassing villages like Trexler. The National Register–listed Virginville Historic District, seven miles to the south, has a similar history as an early trading center along a creek that experienced considerable growth when the railroad arrived in the 1870s and then declined after the railroad was supplanted by highways.

== See also ==
- National Register of Historic Places listings in Berks County, Pennsylvania
- Bridge in Albany Township
- Wanamaker, Kempton and Southern Railroad
