= Wanamaker =

Wanamaker may refer to:

== People ==
- Brad Wanamaker (born 1989), American basketball player
- Elizabeth Wanamaker (1911–1958), American civil rights activist
- John Wanamaker (1838–1922), American merchant, founder of Wanamaker's Department Store, considered by some to be the father of modern advertising
- Madeleine Wanamaker (born 1995), American rower
- Reuben Melville Wanamaker (1866–1924), American judge from Ohio Supreme
- Rick Wanamaker (born 1948), American athlete and basketball player
- Rodman Wanamaker (1863–1928), donor of the Wanamaker Trophy, son of John
- Sam Wanamaker (1919–1993), American actor and movie director, founder of Shakespeare's Globe Theatre in London
- Zoë Wanamaker (born 1949), American-British actress; daughter of Sam

== Places ==
- Wanamaker, Indiana, a community of Indianapolis, US
- Wanamaker, Pennsylvania, a rural community in Lehigh County, US
- Wanamaker, South Dakota, a ghost town

== Other ==
- Wanamaker's, one of the first US department stores, founded in 1861
- The Wanamaker Organ, the world's largest operational pipe organ
- Wanamaker, Kempton & Southern, a railroad with a terminal at Wanamaker, Pennsylvania
- Wanamaker Mile, an annual mile-long race held in Madison Square Garden
- Wanamaker Trophy, the trophy awarded to the winner of the PGA Championship
