= Pennsylvania Route 737 =

State highway in Berks County, Pennsylvania

Pennsylvania Route 737

Route information
- Maintained by PennDOT
- Length: 10.588 mi (17.040 km)
- Existed: March 8, 1962–present

Major junctions
- South end: US 222 in Kutztown
- I-78 / US 22 in Krumsville
- North end: PA 143 in Kempton

Location
- Country: United States
- State: Pennsylvania
- Counties: Berks

Highway system
- Pennsylvania State Route System; Interstate; US; State; Scenic; Legislative
← PA 732	→ PA 739

Pennsylvania Route 737 (PA 737) is a state highway in Berks County, Pennsylvania. The route runs from U.S. Route 222 (US 222) in the borough of Kutztown north to PA 143 in Albany Township. PA 737 heads north from an interchange with US 222 north of Kutztown on Krumsville Road. It continues north through a small part of Maxatawny Township into Greenwich Township. The road features an interchange with Interstate 78 (I-78)/US 22 in the village of Krumsville. PA 737 then heads northwest into Albany Township, where it ends at PA 143 near the village of Kempton.

PA 737 was assigned to a formerly unnumbered road between Kutztown and Kempton on March 8, 1962. Around that time, US 222 served as the southern terminus in downtown Kutztown. When the Kutztown Bypass was constructed in the 1970s, US 222 was realigned off of Main Street in Kutztown and onto the bypass. PA 737, at that point, ended at unnumbered Main Street until 1978, when the south end of the designation was truncated to its current location. Since then, the route has remained on the same alignment. Two bridges along the route between Kutztown and Krumsville were replaced in 2011. The interchange with I-78/US 22 was reconstructed between 2015 and 2019, shifting the route slightly to the east.

== Route description ==
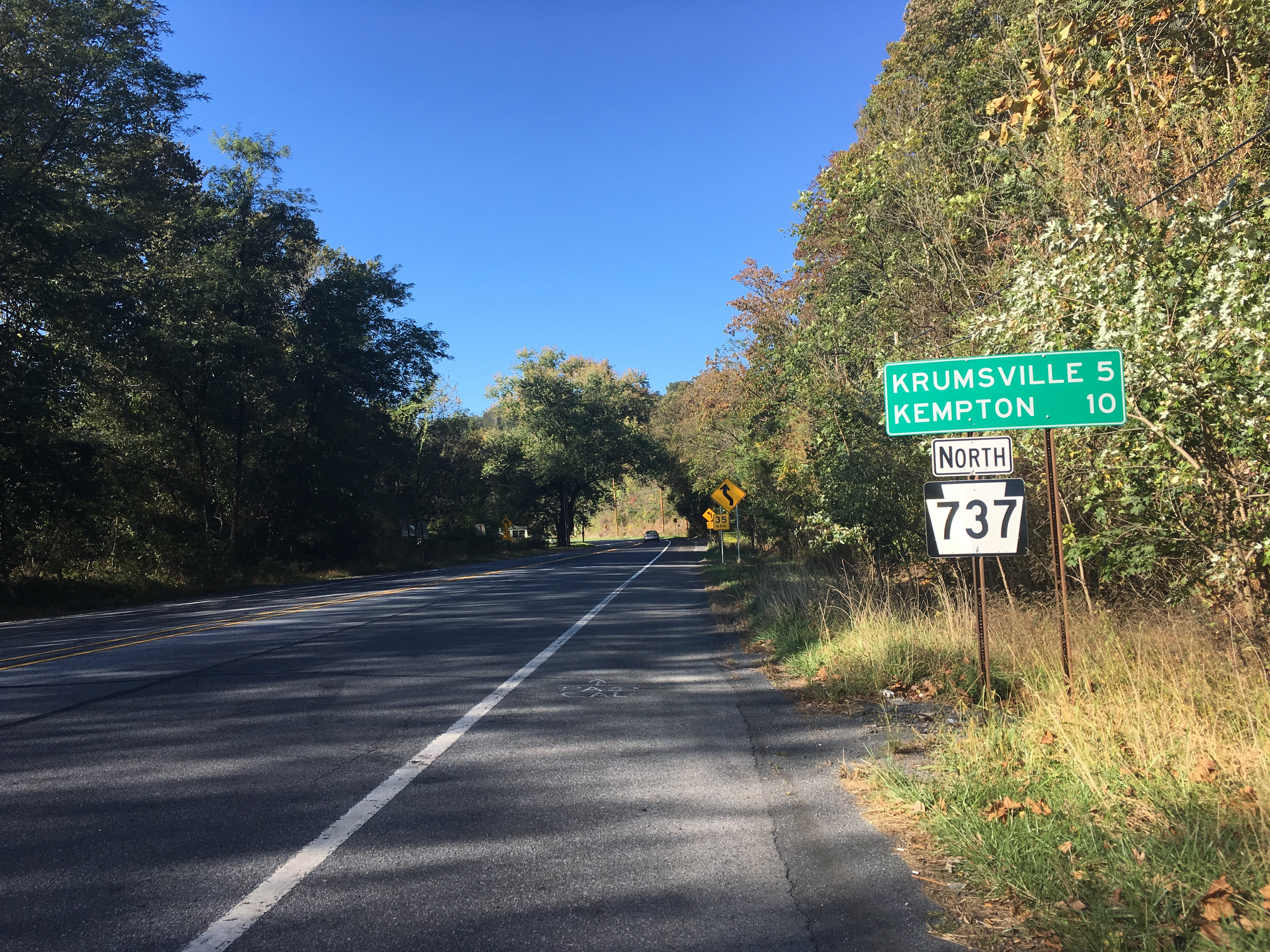
PA 737 northbound past the southern terminus at US 222 in Kutztown

PA 737 begins at a partial cloverleaf interchange with the US 222 freeway on the northern edge of the borough of Kutztown in Berks County as a four-lane divided highway. South of this interchange, the road continues as Greenwich Street, which is designated as an unsigned quadrant route numbered State Route 1021, toward downtown Kutztown. From US 222, the route heads north into Maxatawny Township and soon becomes two-lane undivided Krumsville Road as it runs through forested areas to the east of Sacony Creek. The road heads northwest and then north through an S-curve past a few homes before it turns west and enters Greenwich Township. PA 737 continues through forested land alongside the creek before it turns north away from the Sacony Creek and winds through a hilly mix of woods and farm fields with some homes, passing through an S-curve to the northeast and then northwest before a curve to the north. Farther north, the route heads northeast near a few homes and businesses before it comes to a diamond interchange with I-78/US 22. Past this interchange, the road curves to the north and heads into the community of Krumsville, where it intersects Old Route 22 near residences and a few businesses.

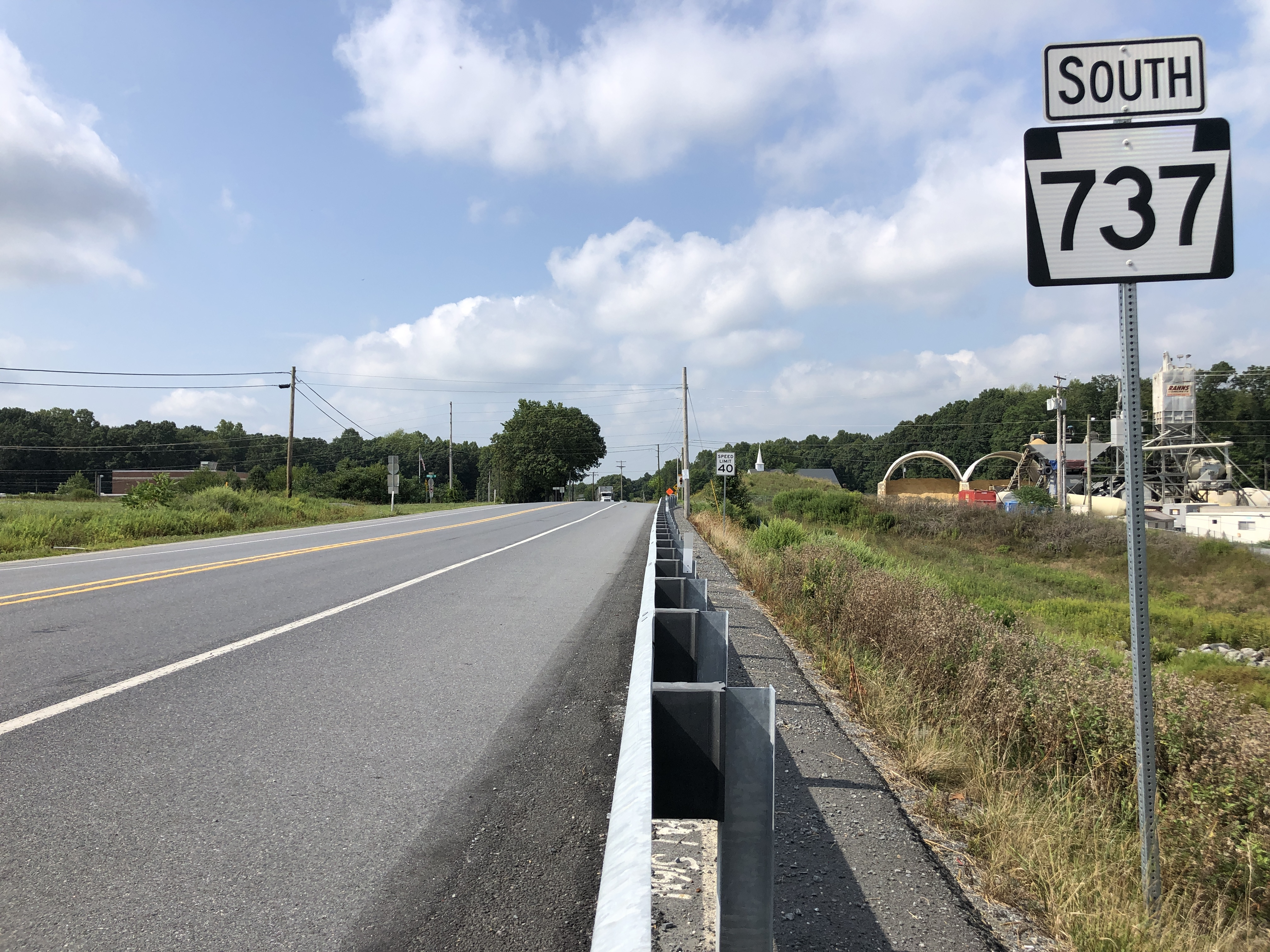
PA 737 southbound past I-78/US 22 in Krumsville

Past Krumsville, PA 737 becomes an unnamed road and enters agricultural areas with some trees and homes, curving to the northwest. The route turns to the north and crosses into Albany Township, where it runs through farmland and woodland. The road passes through forests before it curves northwest and reaches the residential community of Stony Run. PA 737 continues west through a mix of farm fields and woods before it turns to the north and comes to the community of Kempton. Here, the route runs past homes prior to turning west and crossing the Wanamaker, Kempton and Southern Railroad at-grade. PA 737 passes to the south of a mill and heads across Maiden Creek before it continues past rural residences and reaches its northern terminus at an intersection with PA 143.

== History ==
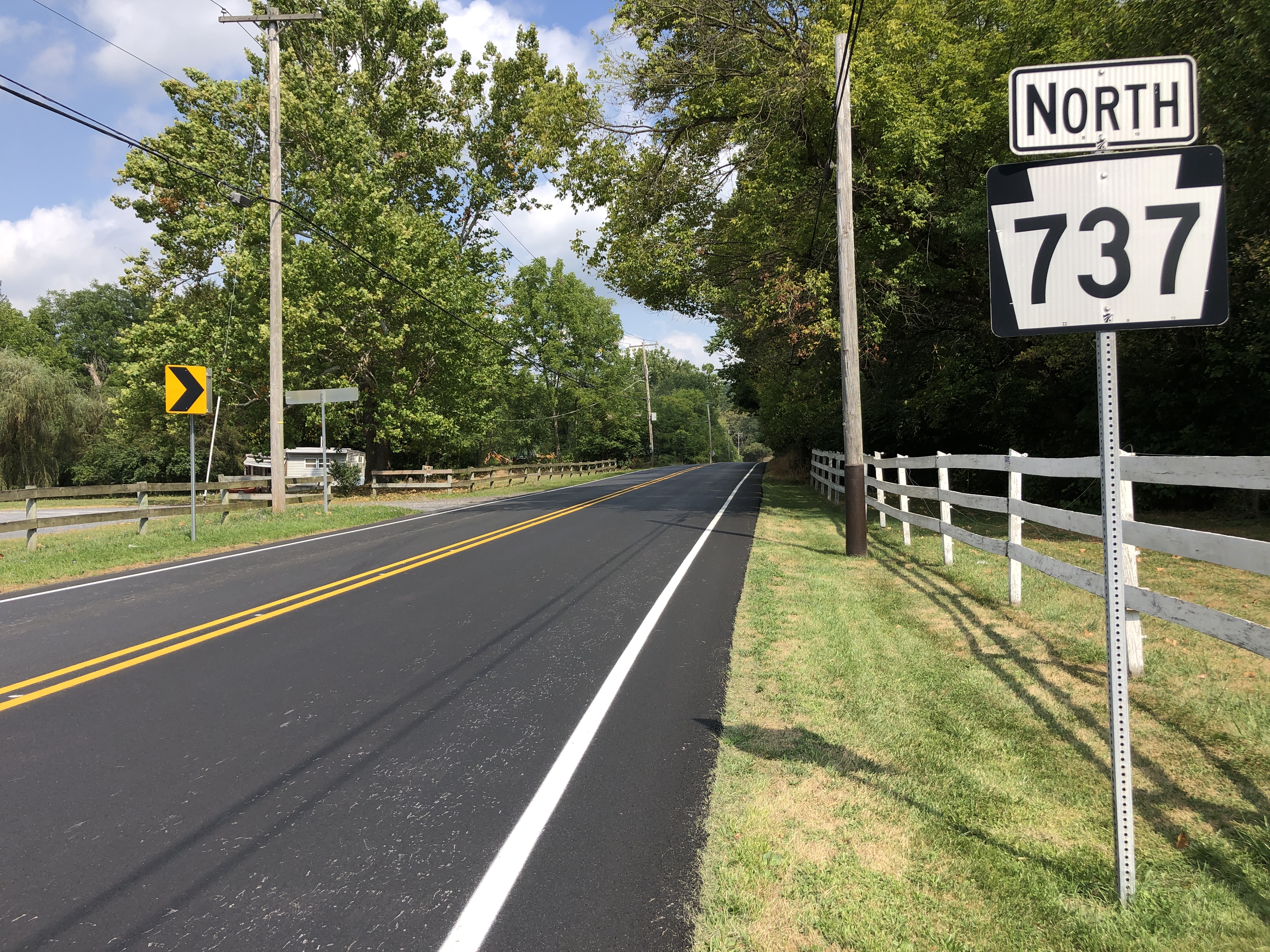
PA 737 northbound in Greenwich Township

PA 737 originated as an unnumbered arterial highway from US 222 (Main Street) in downtown Kutztown north to PA 143 at an intersection in Kempton. On March 8, 1962, this highway was designated by the state as PA 737, which ran north on Greenwich Street out of Kutztown before following its present alignment to Kempton. In 1971, the newly formed Pennsylvania Department of Transportation began construction on the Kutztown Bypass, a freeway alignment of US 222 that was planned to bypass downtown Kutztown. The bypass was constructed in September 1972 and US 222 was realigned onto the new highway in 1973. After the realignment, PA 737 now ended at unnumbered Main Street in downtown Kutztown for a short time. By 1978, the southern terminus of PA 737 was moved to the interchange with the US 222 freeway to the north of Kutztown. The route has remained on the same alignment since.

In 2009, Berks County began to work on design for a new "Accelerated Bridge Program" for several bridges, one on PA 737 and two on nearby quadrant routes. The bridge projects used stimulus money from the American Recovery and Reinvestment Act of 2009, which cost the county about $180,000 (2009 USD) for the studies. In January 2011, work began on replacing the bridge over Mill Creek between Kutz Mill Road and Eagle Point Road, with completion slated for August of that year. Another bridge over Mill Creek between Kohlers Hill Road and Wessner Road closed on July 11, 2011 for replacement. The replacement of this bridge, which cost over $963 thousand and was funded by the state, was completed on December 9, 2011, six months ahead of schedule. Plans were made to reconfigure PA 737 at its interchange with I-78/US 22. This project replaced the partial cloverleaf interchange with a diamond interchange and shifted PA 737 to the east. A roundabout was planned at the ramps serving the eastbound lanes of I-78/US 22 and Zettlemoyer Road but was dropped from the plans. Work on reconstructing the interchange began on June 15, 2015. The interchange reconstruction was completed in 2019.

== Major intersections ==
The entire route is in Berks County.

Location	mi	km	Destinations	Notes
Kutztown–Maxatawny Township line	0.000	0.000	US 222 (Kutztown Bypass) – Allentown, Reading	Interchange; southern terminus
Greenwich Township	4.686	7.541	I-78 / US 22 – Harrisburg, Allentown	Exit 40 (I-78/US 22)
Albany Township	10.588	17.040	PA 143 – Lenhartsville, New Tripoli, Tamaqua	Northern terminus
1.000 mi = 1.609 km; 1.000 km = 0.621 mi

== See also ==
- Pennsylvania Route 863, a highway that follows a similar alignment to PA 737 to the east.
