= Pennsylvania Route 143 =

20-mile-long (32 km) state highway in Pennsylvania

Pennsylvania Route 143

Route information
- Maintained by PennDOT
- Length: 20.039 mi (32.250 km)
- Existed: 1928–present

Major junctions
- South end: PA 662 in Richmond Township
- I-78 / US 22 near Lenhartsville; PA 737 in Kempton; PA 863 in Lynnport
- North end: PA 309 in New Tripoli

Location
- Country: United States
- State: Pennsylvania
- Counties: Berks, Lehigh

Highway system
- Pennsylvania State Route System; Interstate; US; State; Scenic; Legislative
← PA 142	→ PA 144

Pennsylvania Route 143 (PA 143) is a 20-mile-long (32 km) state highway in Pennsylvania. It runs from PA 662 in Richmond Township, Berks County northeast to PA 309 near New Tripoli in Lehigh County, and is signed north-south. The route passes through rural areas, intersecting Interstate 78 (I-78)/U.S. Route 22 (US 22) in Lenhartsville, PA 737 near Kempton, and PA 863 in Lynnport.

What is now PA 143 north of Lenhartsville was originally designated Legislative Route 285 in 1911. PA 143 was designated to in 1928 to run from PA 43 in Lenhartsville to PA 29 near New Tripoli. The route was extended slightly east through New Tripoli by 1940 following a realignment of PA 29. PA 143 was extended south to PA 662 in 1962.

== Route description ==
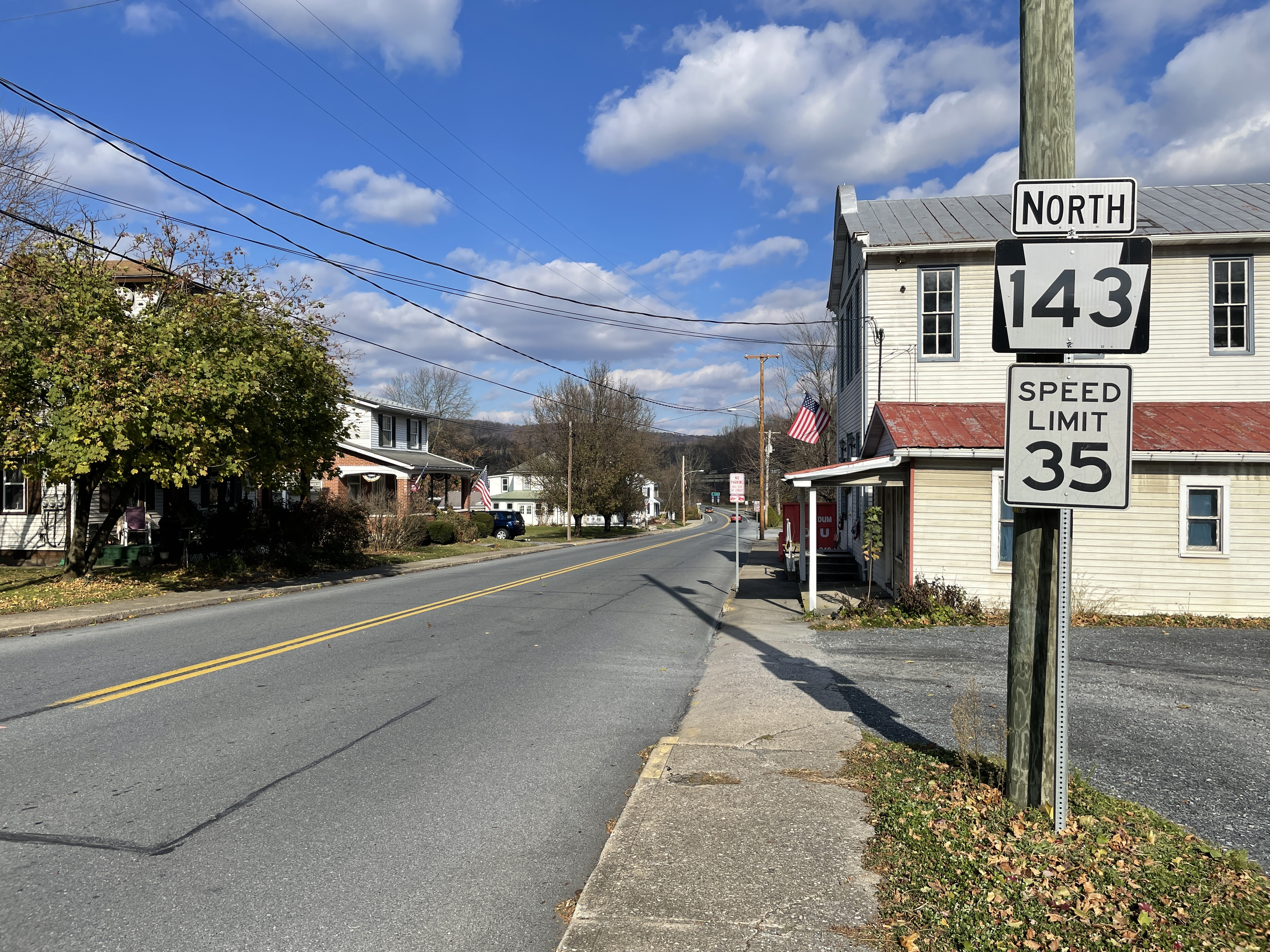
PA 143 northbound in Lenhartsville

PA 143 begins at an intersection with PA 662 in Richmond Township, Berks County, heading to the north on two-lane undivided Hard Hill Road. It turns northwest through a mix of hilly farms and woods with some homes, reaching the Virginville and becoming Main Street. In Virginville, the road crosses the Maiden Creek at the confluence with Sacony Creek into Perry Township, where it runs a short distance to the west of the Maiden Creek with woods to the east and farm fields to the west as an unnamed road. PA 143 continues through rural surroundings as it passes through Windsor Township and into Greenwich Township. The road enters more wooded surroundings and makes a few sharp turns prior to heading west into the borough of Lenhartsville. Here, the road becomes Chestnut Street and passes homes and businesses. The route intersects East Penn Street (Old Route 22) and heads west on East Penn Street for a short distance before turning north onto Willow Street.

Upon leaving Lenhartsville for Greenwich Township again, PA 143 becomes unnamed and reaches a partial cloverleaf interchange with I-78/US 22. From this point, the road winds north through more forested areas, still running to the west of Maiden Creek. The route enters Albany Township and enters a mix of woods and farms as it comes to an intersection with the northern terminus of PA 737 west of Kempton. Following this intersection, the road passes through more rural areas as it runs to the west of Ontelaunee Creek and the Wanamaker, Kempton and Southern Railroad.

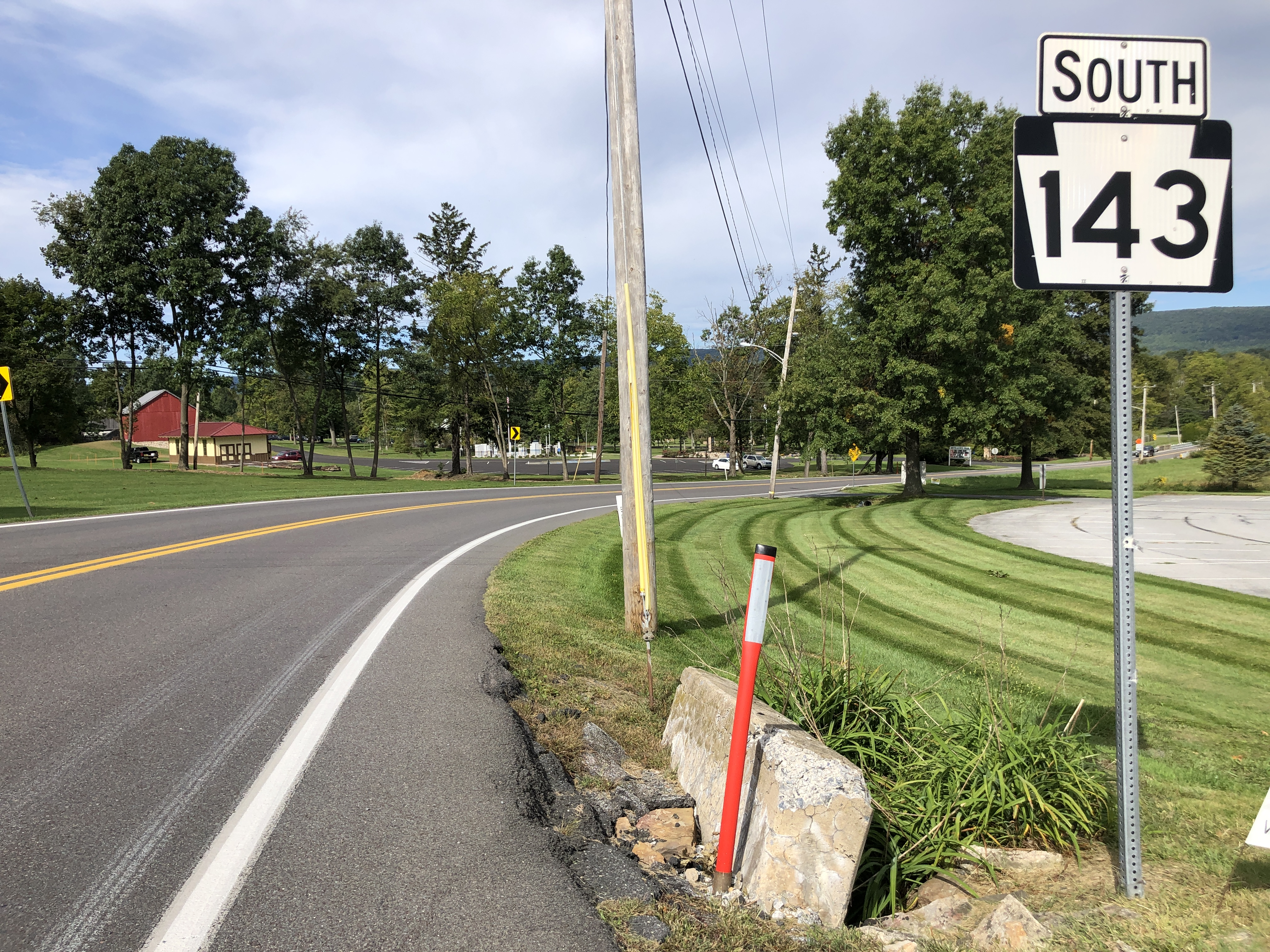
PA 143 southbound in Lynn Township

PA 143 crosses into Lynn Township in Lehigh County, which is in the Lehigh Valley, and continues northeast to Wanamakers as Kings Highway. At this point, the road turns more to the east and passes the terminus of the Wanamaker, Kempton and Southern Railroad as it heads into more agricultural areas with some homes. The route curves northeast and runs through Jacksonville before it turns to the east. Upon reaching Lynnport, PA 143 comes to a junction with the northern terminus of PA 863. From this intersection, the route continues farther east, curving southeast and crossing Ontelaunee Creek. PA 143 turns east and passes through New Tripoli as Decatur Street before reaching its northern terminus at PA 309.

In 2015, PA 143 had an annual average daily traffic count ranging from a high of 2,700 vehicles between PA 863 and PA 309 to a low of 1,000 vehicles between PA 662 and I-78/US 22. None of PA 143 is part of the National Highway System.

== History ==
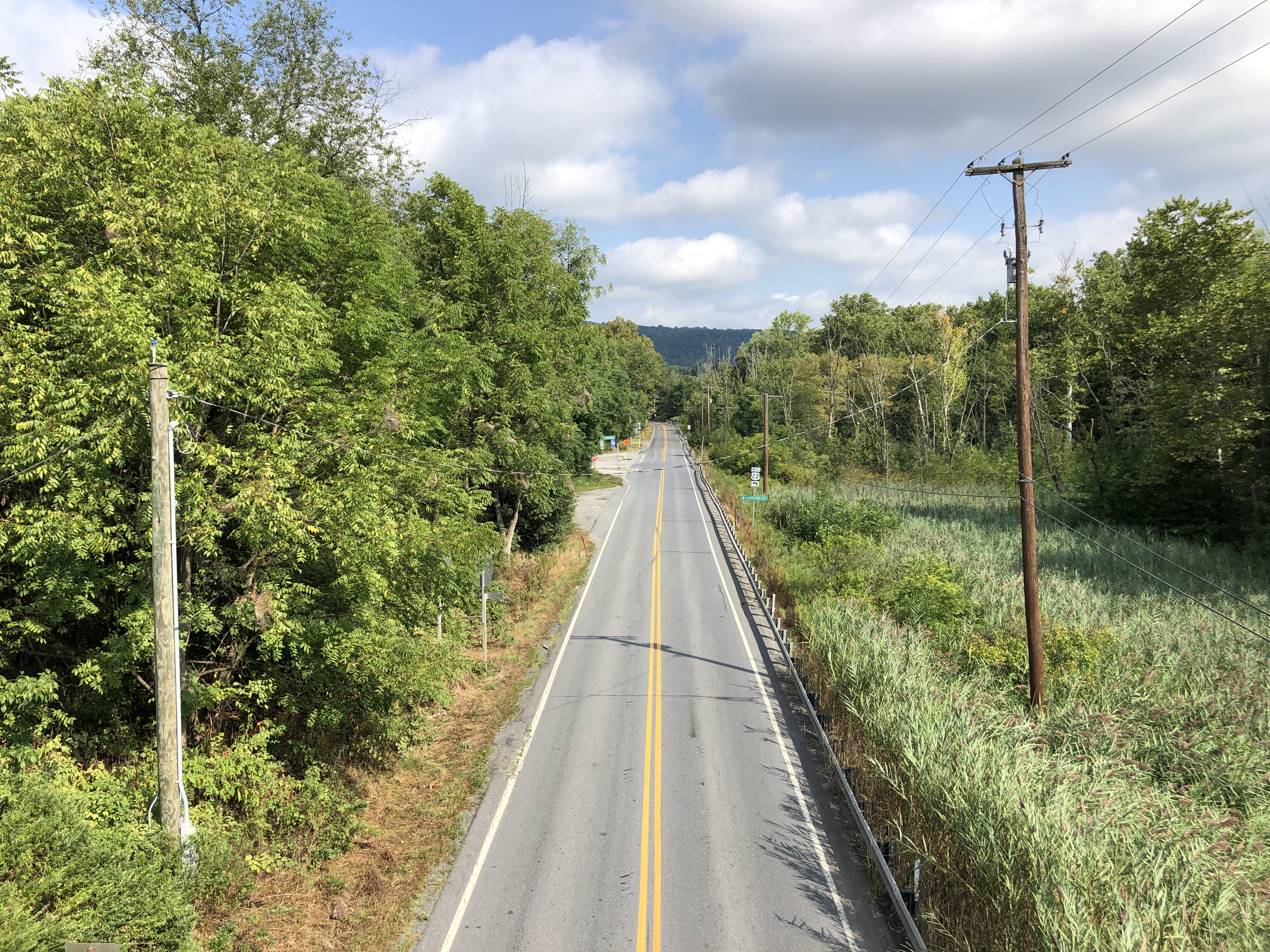
PA 143 northbound at I-78/US 22 in Greenwich Township

What is now PA 143 north of Lenhartsville was designated as part of Legislative Route 285, a legislative route that ran from Hamburg to New Tripoli, in 1911. PA 143 was designated in 1928 to follow its current alignment from PA 43 (now Old Route 22) in Lenhartsville northeast to PA 29 west of New Tripoli. The route was originally unpaved between Lenhartsville and Kempton while the section between Kempton and New Tripoli was paved. By 1940, PA 143 was paved between Lenhartsville and Kempton. Also by this time, PA 143 was extended through New Tripoli to end at PA 29 (now PA 309) to the east of following a realignment of PA 29. PA 143 was extended south from Lenhartsville to its current southern terminus at PA 662 on March 8, 1962.

== Major intersections ==
County	Location	mi	km	Destinations	Notes
Berks	Richmond Township	0.000	0.000	PA 662 (Moselem Springs Road) – Moselem Springs, Shoemakersville	Southern terminus
Berks	Greenwich Township	6.643	10.691	I-78 / US 22 – Harrisburg, Allentown	Exit 35 (I-78 / US 22)
Berks	Albany Township	10.971	17.656	PA 737 south – Kempton, Krumsville	Northern terminus of PA 737
Lehigh	Lynn Township	16.293	26.221	PA 863 south (Behler Road) – New Smithville	Northern terminus of PA 863
Lehigh	Lynn Township	20.039	32.250	PA 309 – Tamaqua, Hazleton, Allentown	Northern terminus
1.000 mi = 1.609 km; 1.000 km = 0.621 mi
