= Lenhart Farm =

- U.S. National Register of Historic Places
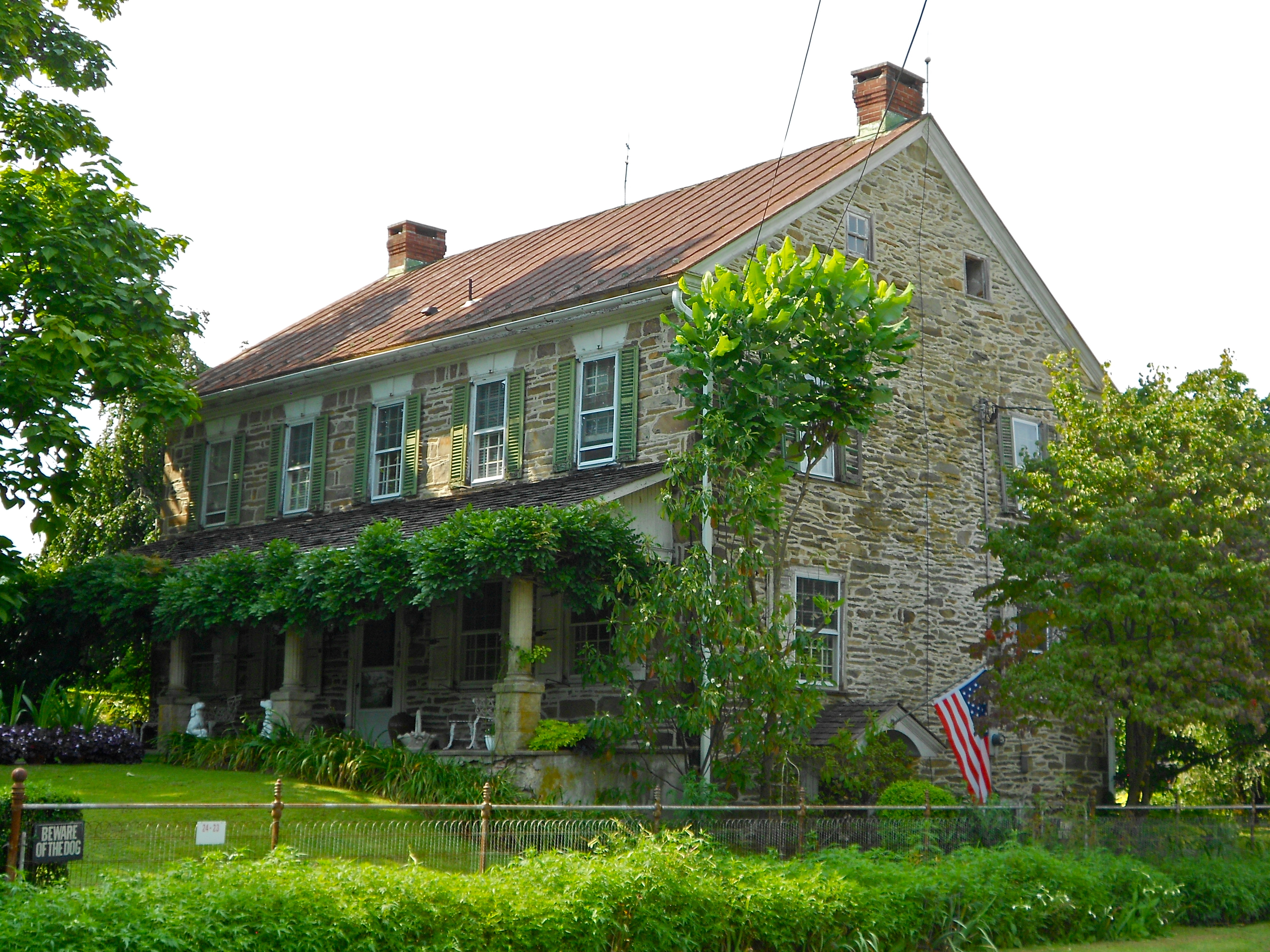
- Lenhart Farm in August 2013

- Location within Pennsylvania Location within the United States
- Location: Jct. of U.S. 22 and PA 143, Lenhartsville, Pennsylvania, U.S.
- Coordinates: 40°34′33″N 75°53′18″W
- Area: 0.2 acres (0.081 ha)
- Architectural style: Georgian
- NRHP reference No.: 78002345
- Added to NRHP: September 18, 1978

Lenhart Farm is a historic house and farm complex located in Lenhartsville, Berks County, Pennsylvania. The house was built by about 1830, and is a 2 1/2-story, five-bay, brownstone dwelling in the Georgian style. Also on the property are a stone and frame bank barn (1841), springhouse, carriage house, and a number of farm-related outbuildings.

It was listed on the National Register of Historic Places in 1978.
