= Lynnport, Pennsylvania =

Unincorporated community in Pennsylvania, US

- Unincorporated community
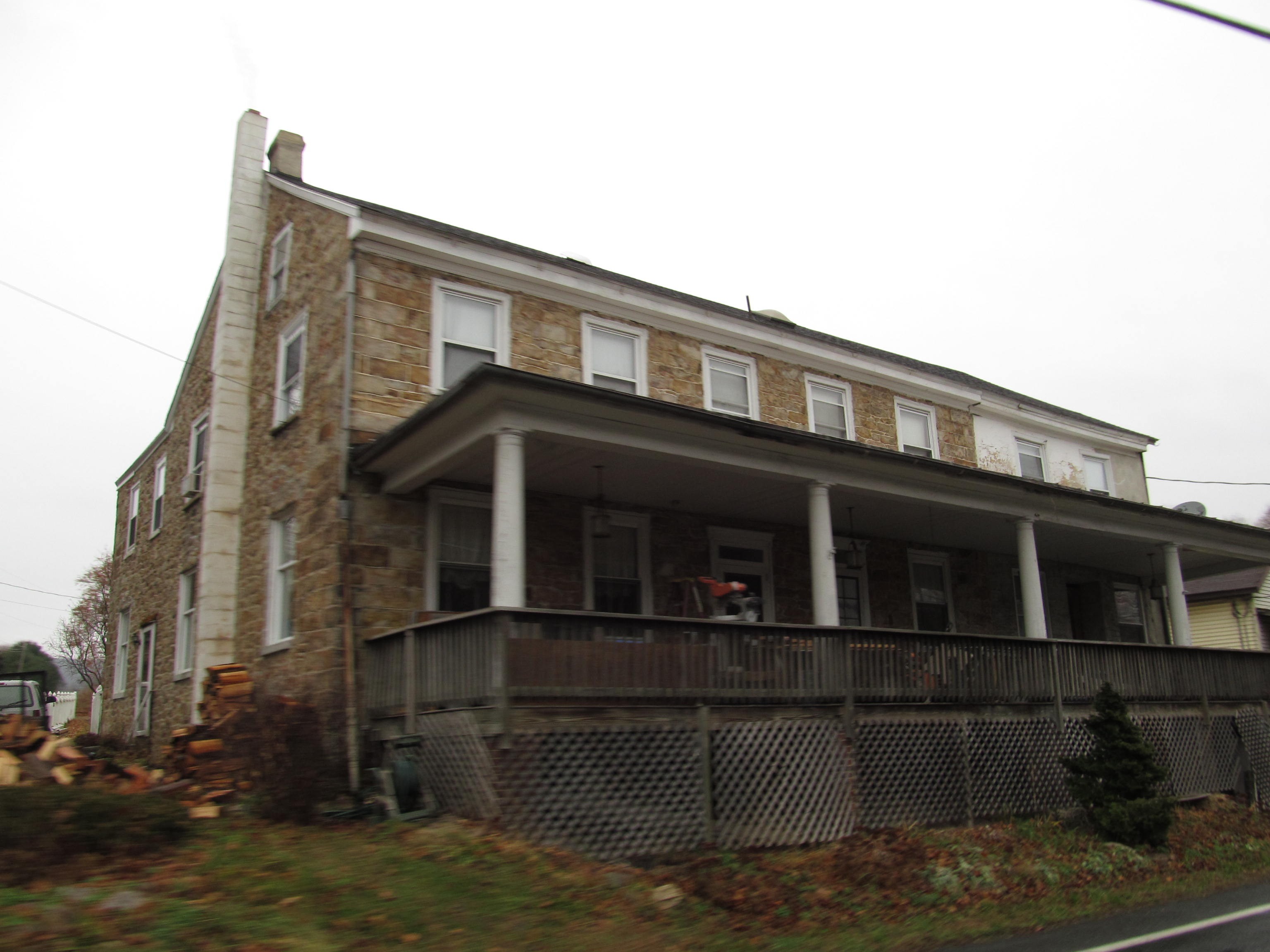
- House in Lynnport, December 2012

- Location within Pennsylvania Location within the United States
- Coordinates: 40°40′31″N 75°48′18″W
- Country: United States
- State: Pennsylvania
- County: Lehigh
- Township: Lynn
- Elevation: 482 ft (147 m)

Population
  - Metro: 865,310 (US: 68th)
- Time zone: UTC-5 (Eastern (EST))
  - Summer (DST): UTC-4 (EDT)
- ZIP Code: 18066
- Area codes: 610 and 484
- GNIS feature ID: 1180128

Lynnport is a small unincorporated community in Lynn Township in Lehigh County, Pennsylvania, United States. It is part of the Lehigh Valley, which has a population of 861,899 and is the 68th-most populous metropolitan area in the U.S. as of the 2020 census.

Lynnport is located on PA Route 143 and has an elevation of 486 feet (148 m).

== Relation to Lynn Township ==
Lynnport is part of Lynn Township in Lehigh County. It is located next to the small village of New Tripoli. Together, these two separate entities make up Lehigh County's largest township.

== Location and demographics ==
Lynn Township is the largest township by geographic size in Lehigh County. Located in the northwestern corner of the county, it neighbors Heidelberg Township to the east, Weisenberg Township to the south, Albany Township in Berks County to the west and West Penn Township in Schuylkill County to the north. The township has 41.3 square miles (110 km^{2}) of mountains and rolling hills and beautiful countryside. The population was 4,150 as of 2009.

== Emergency services and community ==
Lynnport is served by the Lynnport Community Fire Company #1. This station houses five trucks, a social hall, and large parking areas. It is located in the center of Lynnport. Emergency medical services are provided by the Cetronia Ambulance Corps. Police response is provided by the Pennsylvania State Police, many coming from the Fogelsville barracks. While response time for fire and EMS is very low, due to the proximity of the stations, police response can sometimes be higher due to the lack of a municipal or regional police force. All emergency services are backed up by surrounding organizations, such as the New Tripoli Fire Company, or Northern Valley EMS (NoVa).

Lynnport also is home to Jacobs UCC Church, which provides services as well as a large social and recreation hall.
