= Bridge in Albany Township =

Historic place in the United States

- U.S. National Register of Historic Places
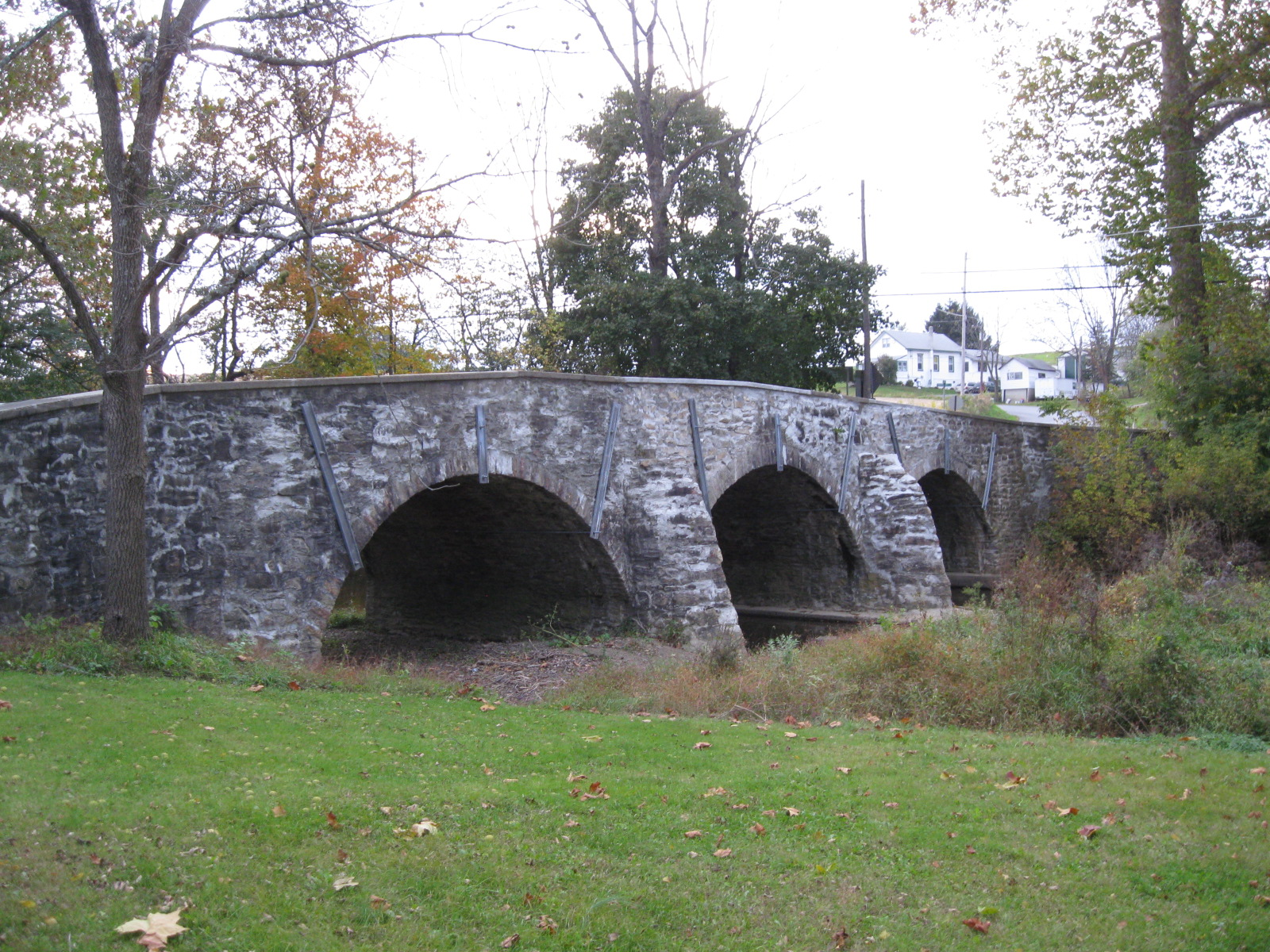
- Bridge in Albany Township, October 2009

- Location within Pennsylvania Location within the United States
- Location: Legislative Route 06173 over Maiden Creek, Albany Township, Pennsylvania
- Coordinates: 40°38′7″N 75°51′21″W
- Area: less than one acre
- Built: 1841
- Architectural style: Multiple span stone arch
- MPS: Highway Bridges Owned by the Commonwealth of Pennsylvania, Department of Transportation TR
- NRHP reference No.: 88000769
- Added to NRHP: June 22, 1988

Bridge in Albany Township, also known as Trexler Bridge, is a historic stone arch bridge located at Albany Township in Berks County, Pennsylvania. It is a multiple span 100-foot-long (30 m), stone arch bridge with three spans, constructed in 1841. It crosses Maiden Creek.

It was listed on the National Register of Historic Places in 1988. It is located in the Trexler Historic District.
