= Kistler Creek =

River in Pennsylvania, United States

Coordinates: 40°37′35″N 75°51′19″W

Kistler Creek is a 6.8-mile-long (10.9 km) tributary of Maiden Creek in Berks County, Pennsylvania in the United States.

Kistler Creek and Ontelaunee Creek join in the community of Kempton to form Maiden Creek.

== See also ==
- List of rivers of Pennsylvania
