= Wanamaker, South Dakota =

Coordinates: 43.4605552°N 101.3543134°W

Wanamaker is a ghost town in Jackson County, in the U.S. state of South Dakota.

== History ==
A post office called Wanamaker was established in 1914, and remained in operation until 1951. The town had the name of John Wanamaker, proprietor of Wanamaker's department store and 35th United States Postmaster General.
