= New Smithville, Pennsylvania =

Unincorporated community in Pennsylvania, US

- Unincorporated community
- Location within Pennsylvania Location within the United States
- Coordinates: 40°34′47″N 75°43′42″W
- Country: United States
- State: Pennsylvania
- County: Lehigh
- Township: Weisenberg
- Elevation: 554 ft (169 m)

Population
  - Metro: 865,310 (US: 68th)
- Time zone: UTC-5 (Eastern (EST))
  - Summer (DST): UTC-4 (EDT)
- ZIP Codes: 18031, 19530
- Area codes: 610 and 484
- GNIS feature ID: 1204280

New Smithville is an unincorporated community in Weisenberg Township in Lehigh County, Pennsylvania, United States. It is located west of the city of Allentown and near the border with Berks County. It is part of the Lehigh Valley, which has a population of 861,899 and is the 68th-most populous metropolitan area in the U.S. as of the 2020 census.

It is located at the intersection of Pennsylvania Route 863 and Interstate 78/U.S. Route 22. It is split between the Breinigsville ZIP code of 18031 and the Kutztown ZIP code of 19530. It is in the Schuylkill watershed and is drained via the Mill Creek and Sacony Creek into the Maiden Creek. The New Smithville telephone exchange uses area code 610.
