= Wanamaker, Pennsylvania =

Coordinates: 40.6610°N 75.8457°W

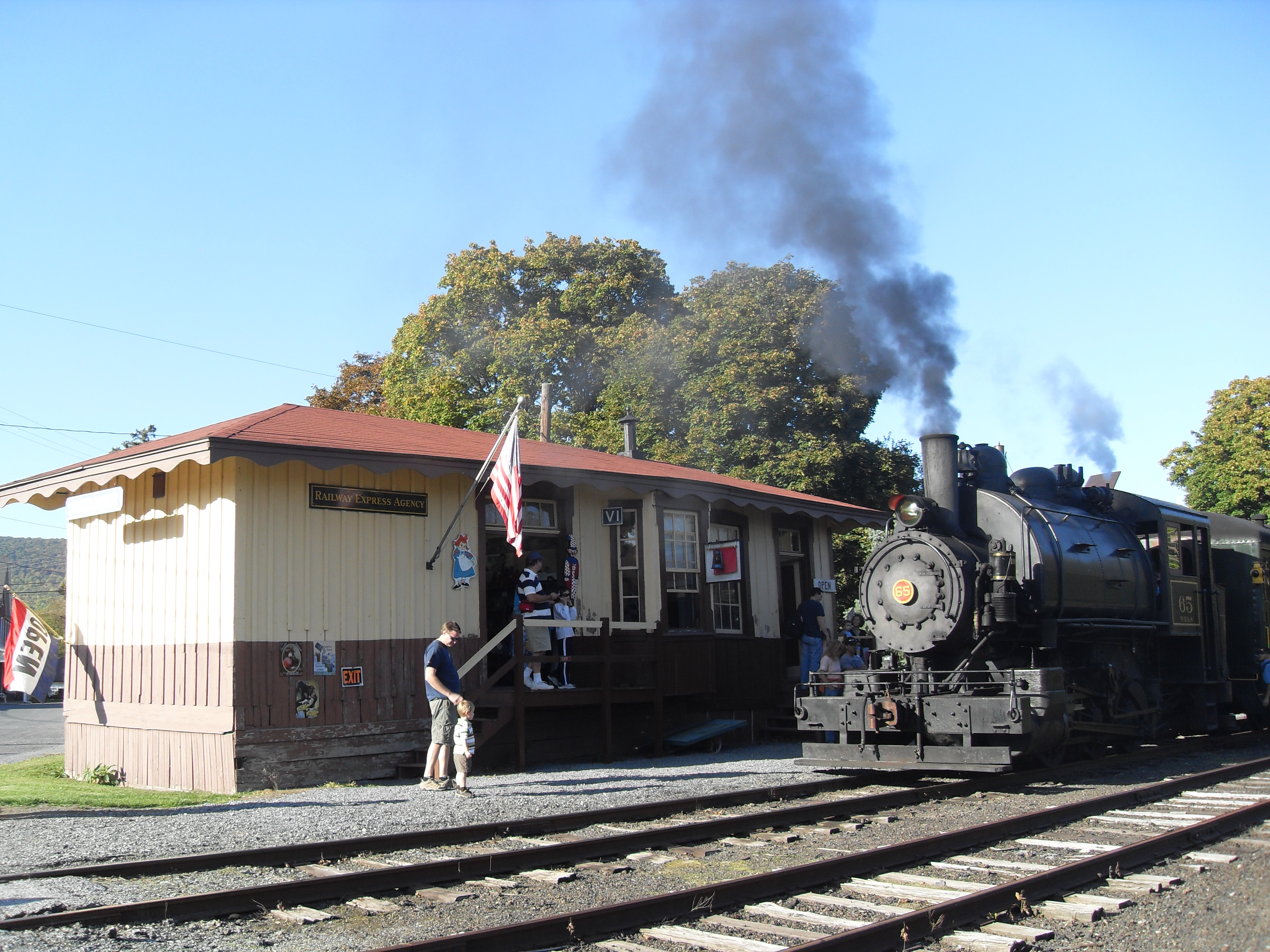
Wanamaker, Pennsylvania train station, January 2010

Wanamaker is small community in Lehigh County, Pennsylvania. It is part of the Lehigh Valley metropolitan area, which had a population of 861,899 and was the 68th most populous metropolitan area in the U.S. as of the 2020 census.

Philip Wanamaker settled at the location about 1791. His son, Christian, later operated a grist mill. The railway station of the Berks County Railroad, later the Schuylkill and Lehigh Branch of the Reading Company, was opened in 1874. Regular passenger service ceased in 1949. Today, the Wanamaker station is the end station for the Wanamaker, Kempton and Southern Railroad, a local scenic railroad.
