= Lenhartsville, Pennsylvania =

Borough in Pennsylvania, US

- Borough
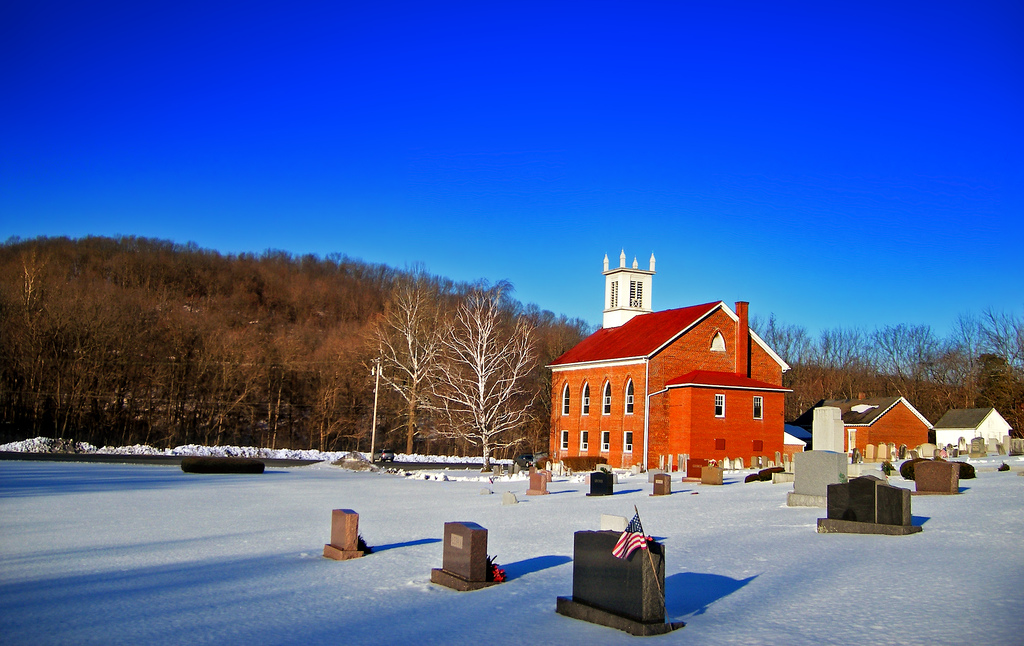
- A winter day in Lenhartsville

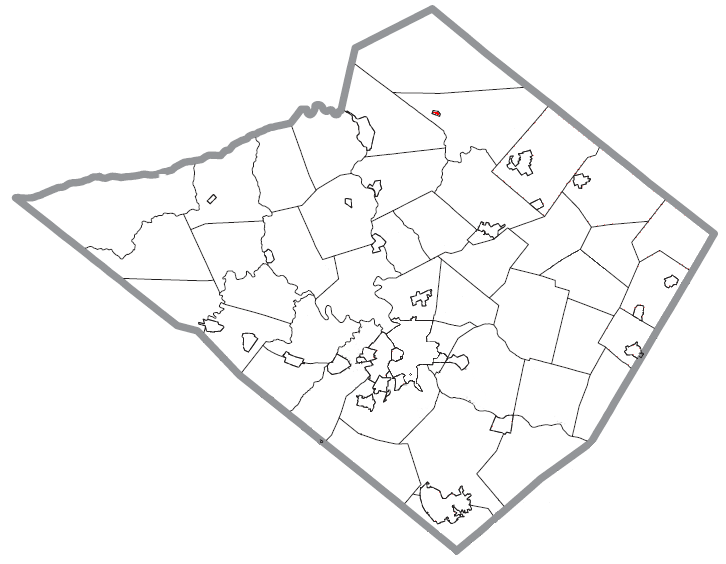
- Location of Lenhartsville in Berks County in Pennsylvania

- Location of Lenhartsville in Pennsylvania Lenhartsville (the United States)
- Coordinates: 40°34′24″N 75°53′12″W
- Country: United States
- State: Pennsylvania
- County: Berks

Area
  - Total: 0.19 sq mi (0.49 km^{2})
  - Land: 0.19 sq mi (0.48 km^{2})
  - Water: 0.0039 sq mi (0.01 km^{2})
- Elevation: 381 ft (116 m)

Population (2020)
  - Total: 180
  - Density: 973.3/sq mi (375.79/km^{2})
- Time zone: UTC-5 (EST)
  - Summer (DST): UTC-4 (EDT)
- ZIP Code: 19534
- Area code: 610
- FIPS code: 42-42688
- Website: https://lenhartsville.com/

Lenhartsville is a borough in Berks County, Pennsylvania, United States. The population was 180 at the 2020 census.

== Geography ==
Lenhartsville is located in northern Berks County at 40°34′24″N 75°53′12″W (40.573438, -75.886717), in the valley of Maiden Creek. It is surrounded by Greenwich Township but is separate from it. According to the U.S. Census Bureau, Lenhartsville has a total area of 0.14 square miles (0.35 km^{2}), of which 0.004 square miles (0.01 km^{2}), or 2.75%, is water.

== History ==
Heinrich (Henry) Lenhart, 1773–1837, son of Jacob Lenhart, is considered the founder of Lenhartsville, on land once owned by his grandfather Johan Peter Lenhart.

The Lenhart Farm was listed on the National Register of Historic Places in 1978.

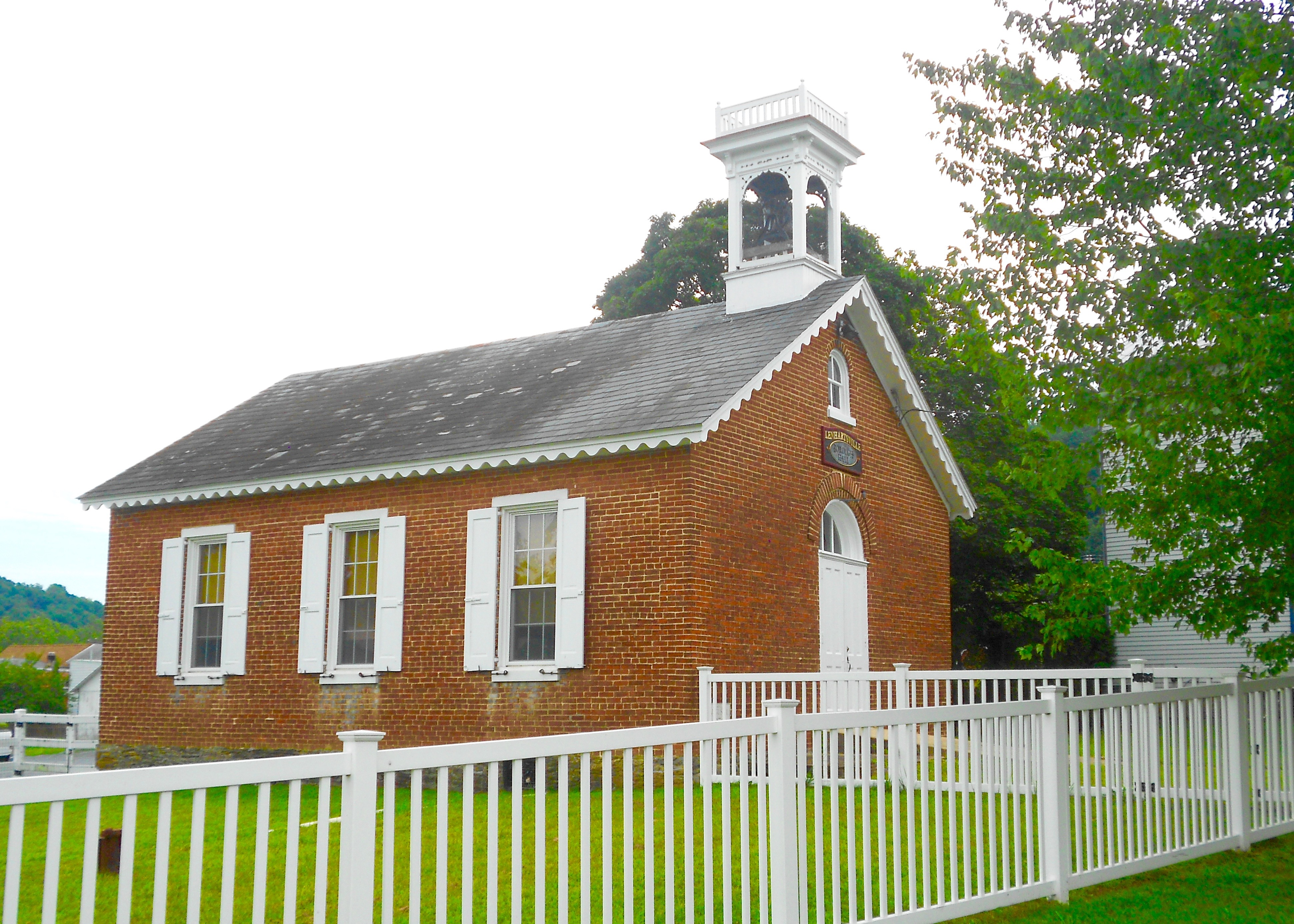
Borough Hall

== Demographics ==
Historical population
Census	Pop.	Note	%±
1880	161		—
1890	152		−5.6%
1900	144		−5.3%
1910	153		6.3%
1920	144		−5.9%
1930	204		41.7%
1940	211		3.4%
1950	229		8.5%
1960	209		−8.7%
1970	220		5.3%
1980	200		−9.1%
1990	195		−2.5%
2000	173		−11.3%
2010	165		−4.6%
2020	180		9.1%

At the 2000 census, there were 173 people, 78 households, and 47 families living in the borough. The population density was 1,296.6 inhabitants per square mile (500.6/km^{2}). There were 82 housing units at an average density of 614.6 per square mile (237.3/km^{2}). The racial makeup of the borough was 100.00% White. Hispanic or Latino of any race were 0.58%. Historically there is a large Pennsylvania Dutch population.

There were 78 households, 23.1% had children under the age of 18 living with them, 53.8% were married couples living together, 7.7% had a female householder with no husband present, and 38.5% were non-families. 28.2% of households were made up of individuals, and 14.1% were one person aged 65 or older. The average household size was 2.22 and the average family size was 2.73.

The age distribution was 17.3% under the age of 18, 8.7% from 18 to 24, 31.2% from 25 to 44, 26.0% from 45 to 64, and 16.8% 65 or older. The median age was 37 years. For every 100 females there were 96.6 males. For every 100 females age 18 and over, there were 93.2 males.

The median household income was $36,071 and the median family income was $36,964. Males had a median income of $35,000 versus $20,500 for females. The per capita income for the borough was $16,998. About 9.4% of families and 9.8% of the population were below the poverty line, including 7.1% of those under the age of eighteen and 8.3% of those sixty five or over.

== Transportation ==
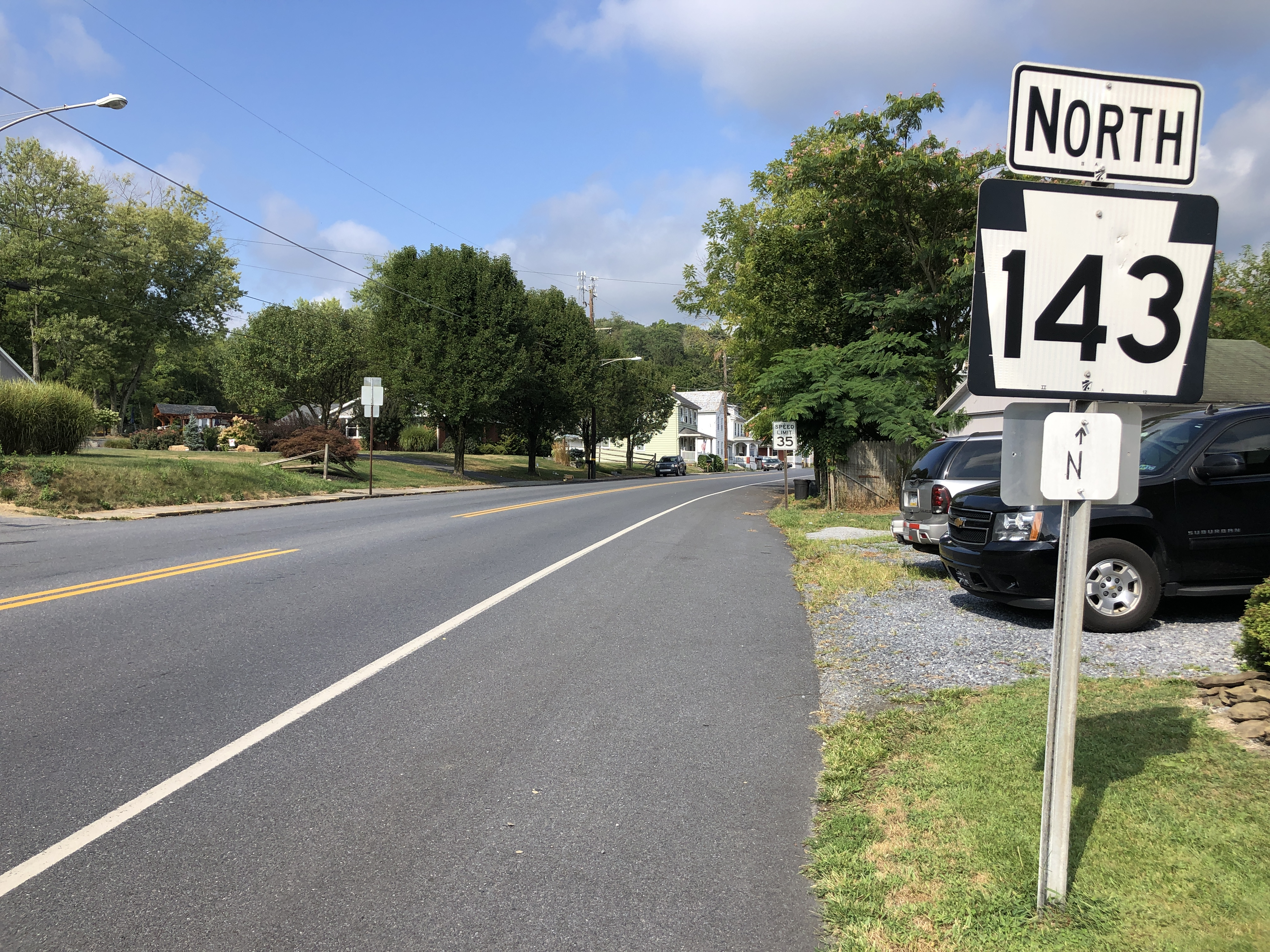
PA 143 northbound in Lenhartsville

As of 2007, there were 1.00 mile (1.61 km) of public roads in Lenhartsville, of which 0.52 miles (0.84 km) were maintained by the Pennsylvania Department of Transportation (PennDOT) and 0.48 miles (0.77 km) were maintained by the borough.

Pennsylvania Route 143 is the only state highway serving Lenhartsville. It follows a southeast-to-northwest alignment through the borough via Chestnut Street and Willow Street. From Lenhartsville, PA 143 leads south 8 miles (13 km) via Pennsylvania Route 662 to U.S. Route 222 between Kutztown and Reading, and northeast 13 miles (21 km) to New Tripoli.

The Interstate 78/U.S. Route 22 freeway passes just north of the borough, with access to Lenhartsville via Exit 35. I-78/US 22 leads east 23 miles (37 km) to Allentown and west 59 miles (95 km) to Harrisburg.
