= New Tripoli, Pennsylvania =

Unincorporated community in Pennsylvania, US

- Census-designated place
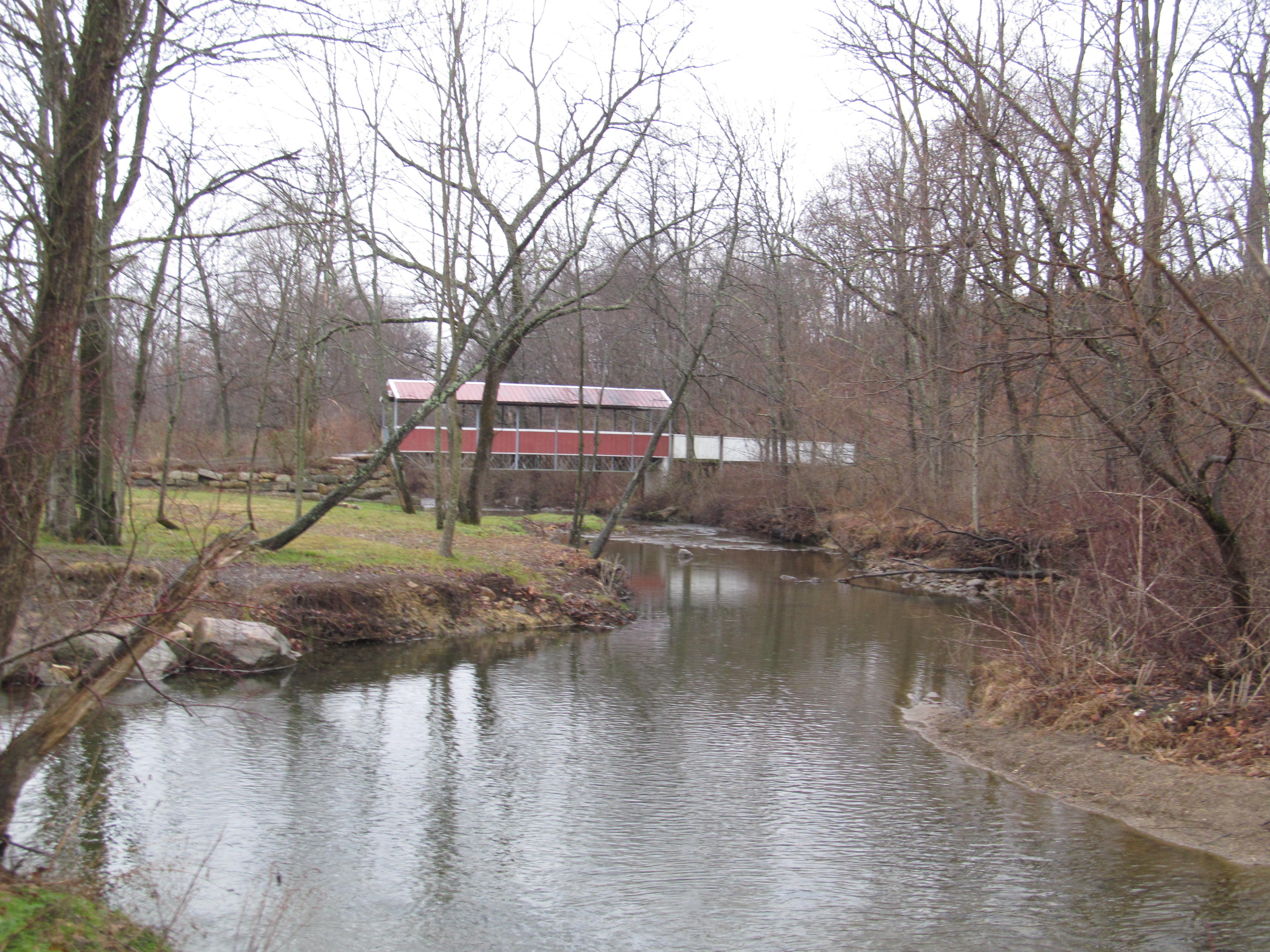
- School Creek in New Tripoli in December 2012

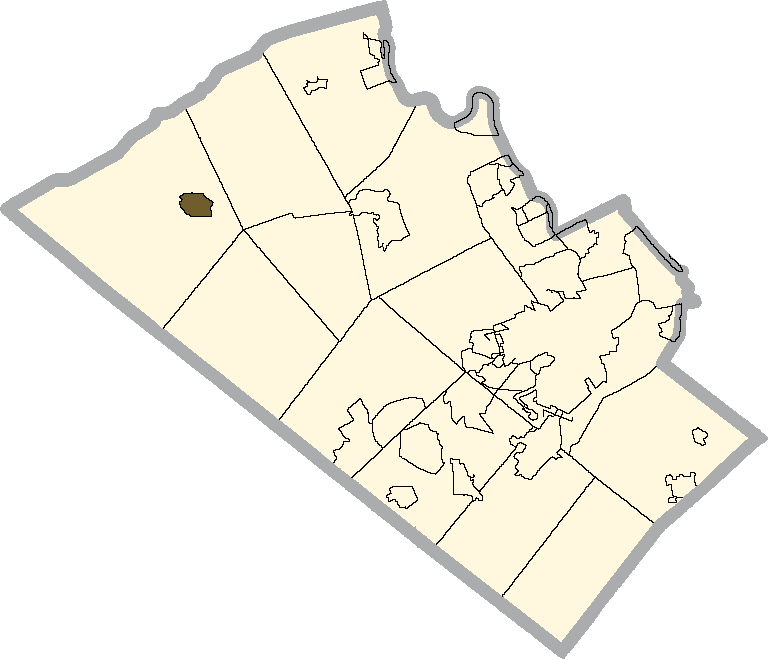
- Location of New Tripoli in Lehigh County, Pennsylvania

- Location of New Tripoli in Pennsylvania Location in the United States
- Coordinates: 40°40′51″N 75°45′07″W
- Country: United States
- State: Pennsylvania
- County: Lehigh
- Township: Lynn

Area
  - Census-designated place: 0.92 sq mi (2.38 km^{2})
  - Land: 0.92 sq mi (2.37 km^{2})
  - Water: 0 sq mi (0.00 km^{2})
- Elevation: 578 ft (176 m)

Population (2020)
  - Census-designated place: 840
  - Density: 916.4/sq mi (353.83/km^{2})
  - Metro: 865,310 (US: 68th)
- Time zone: UTC-5 (Eastern (EST))
  - Summer (DST): UTC-4 (EDT)
- ZIP Code: 18066
- Area codes: 610 and 484
- FIPS code: 42-54288
- GNIS feature ID: 1182377

New Tripoli (/trɪˈpoʊli/ trih-POH-lee) is an unincorporated community and census-designated place (CDP) in Lynn Township in Lehigh County, Pennsylvania. As of the 2020 census, the population was 840. New Tripoli is part of the Lehigh Valley.

New Tripoli was originally founded in 1812 as Saegersville, but was changed in 1816 to New Tripoli in honor of the success of the American navy in 1815 during the Barbary Wars at Tripoli in what is now Libya. Unlike how the capital of the country Libya is normally pronounced by Americans, the pronunciation of New Tripoli is with the stress on "PO", as many non-natives make the mistake of stressing the first syllable which will often be corrected by natives. The New Tripoli ZIP Code is 18066 and it is in area code 610, exchange 298.

== Geography ==
New Tripoli is located at the intersection of Madison Street and Pennsylvania Route 143 near Pennsylvania Route 309 on the northern edge of the Lehigh Valley region of eastern Pennsylvania. It is in northwestern Lehigh County, in the eastern part of Lynn Township. PA 143 leads east 0.5 miles (0.8 km) to PA 309 and southwest 8 miles (13 km) to Kempton. PA 309 leads southeast 14 miles (23 km) to the west side of the Allentown area and northwest across Blue Mountain 16 miles (26 km) to Tamaqua.

According to the U.S. Census Bureau, New Tripoli has a total area of 0.93 square miles (2.4 km^{2}), of which 41,340 square feet (3,841 m^{2}), or 0.16%, are water. School Creek flows westward through the north side of town, joining Ontelaunee Creek just west of the CDP border. Water runoff from the town flows via School Creek, Ontelaunee Creek, and Maiden Creek to the Schuylkill River, part of the Delaware River watershed.

== Education ==
The village is served by Northwestern Lehigh School District, which is located in New Tripoli.

Historical population
Census	Pop.	Note	%±
2000	654		—
2010	898		37.3%
2020	840		−6.5%
