= Wanamaker, Kempton and Southern Railroad =

Heritage railroad company in US

Coordinates: 40.6304°N 75.8503°W

Wanamaker, Kempton & Southern Railroad
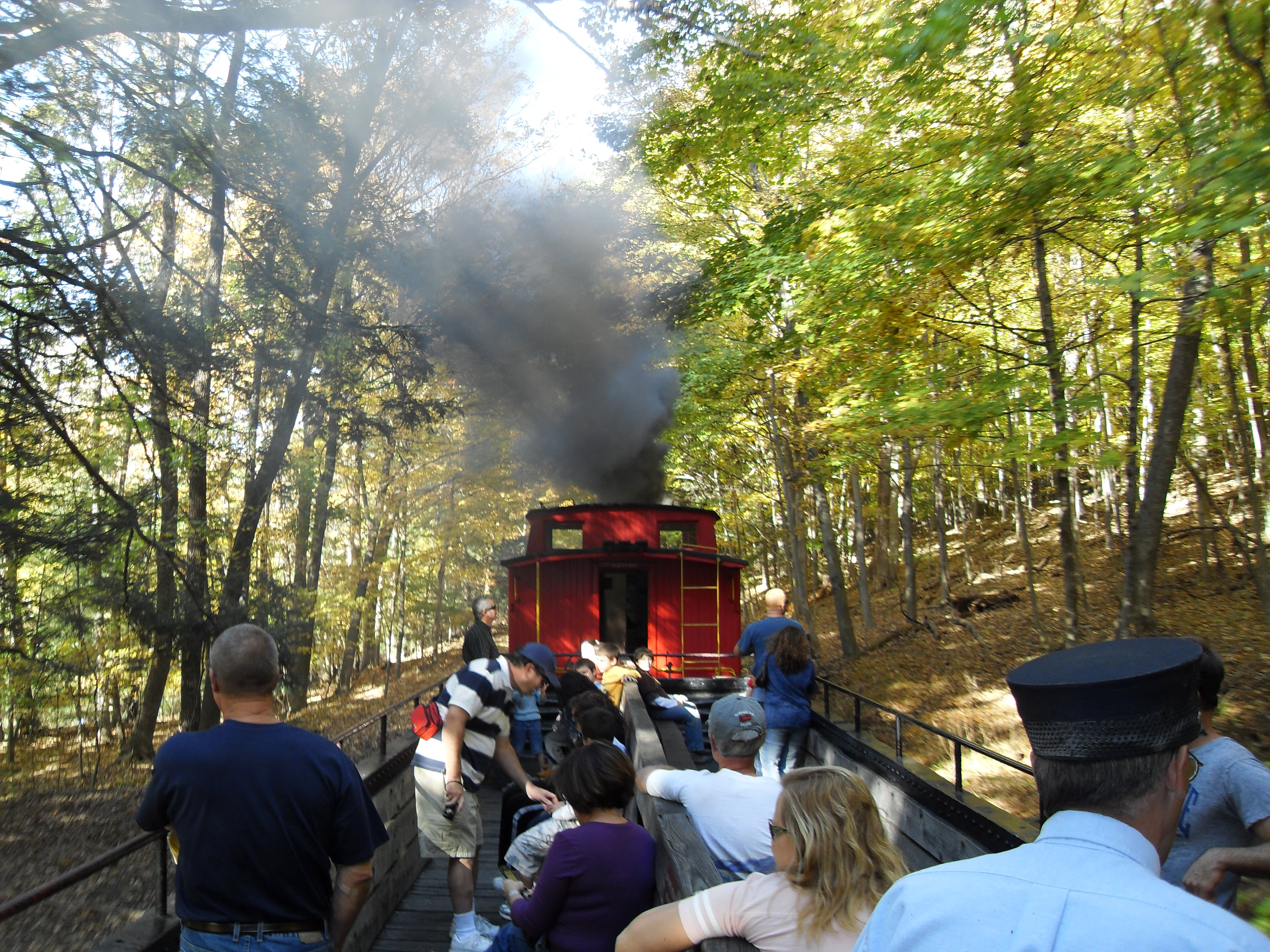

Overview
- Headquarters: Kempton, Pennsylvania, U.S.
- Reporting mark: WKS
- Locale: Pennsylvania
- Dates of operation: 1963–present

Technical
- Track gauge: 4 ft 8 1/2 in (1,435 mm) standard gauge

Other
- Website: kemptontrain.com

The Wanamaker, Kempton & Southern, Inc. (WK&S) is a privately owned heritage railroad company in Kempton, Pennsylvania. The company was founded in 1963 and operates over an isolated remnant of a former Reading Company line. Its nickname is the Hawk Mountain Line due to its proximity to the Hawk Mountain range. The line runs along Ontelaunee Creek near areas favored by birdwatchers.

== Operations ==
The WK&S operates tourist trains on about three miles (4.8 km) of track between Kempton and Wanamaker regularly on weekends between May and November as well as on special occasions using either diesel or steam engines. Its Kempton station is not the original one, but consists of buildings from the Reading Company that were brought to their current location. The ticket office was the original station at Joanna, Pennsylvania.

The company owns a shop building and an additional 1.5 miles (2.4 km) of track south of Kempton.

== History ==
The origins of the Wanamaker, Kempton & Southern date back to 1870 with the charter of a new railroad, the Berks County Railroad and later the Berks and Lehigh Railroad. In a very short time, the new line was bankrupt. It went to the Philadelphia and Reading Railroad as the renamed Schuylkill and Lehigh line, a small branch line from Reading to Slatedale where the Reading connected with the Lehigh Valley Railroad. With the decline of railroads, the Reading Company filed abandonment of the Schuylkill and Lehigh line.

In 1963 a group of volunteers founded the Wanamaker, Kempton & Southern Railroad with its main purpose to preserve railroad history. The original plan for the line was to operate 11.5 miles (18.5 km) of track from Kempton to Germansville. However this did not happen because an uncooperative land owner forced the new railroad to stop where the owner's land started, which is why the railroad stops just a north of Wanamaker along Route 143. The new railroad purchased three miles (4.8 km) of track for $65,000. After the rest of the line was abandoned, the tracks south of Kempton were next on the list to be scrapped, but the WK&S had no money to purchase the line. However, the scrapper donated 1.2 miles (1.9 km) of track south of Kempton. The end of the line to the south became North Albany.

== Motive power ==
No.	Builder	Year	Type	Status	Notes
2	H.K. Porter	1920	0-4-0 steam locomotive	Out of service	No future plans
4	Baldwin	1914	2-6-2 steam locomotive	Stored, awaiting restoration	Purchased 2008; will be restored for operation
65	H.K. Porter	1930	0-6-0ST steam locomotive	Undergoing 1,472-day inspection and overhaul	Being rebuilt and brought up to FRA code to be returned to service
250	Baldwin	1926	2-6-2 steam locomotive	Restoration	Awaiting restoration at the Grafton and Upton Railroad, Grafton, Massachusetts
602	Whitcomb	1944	diesel-electric locomotive	Out of service	
734	General Electric	1956	65-ton switcher locomotive	Operational	Restoration completed in 2010; received in trade from Railway Restoration Project 113 for Jersey Central business car 98
7258	General Electric	1941	45-ton switcher locomotive	Operational	

== Gallery ==
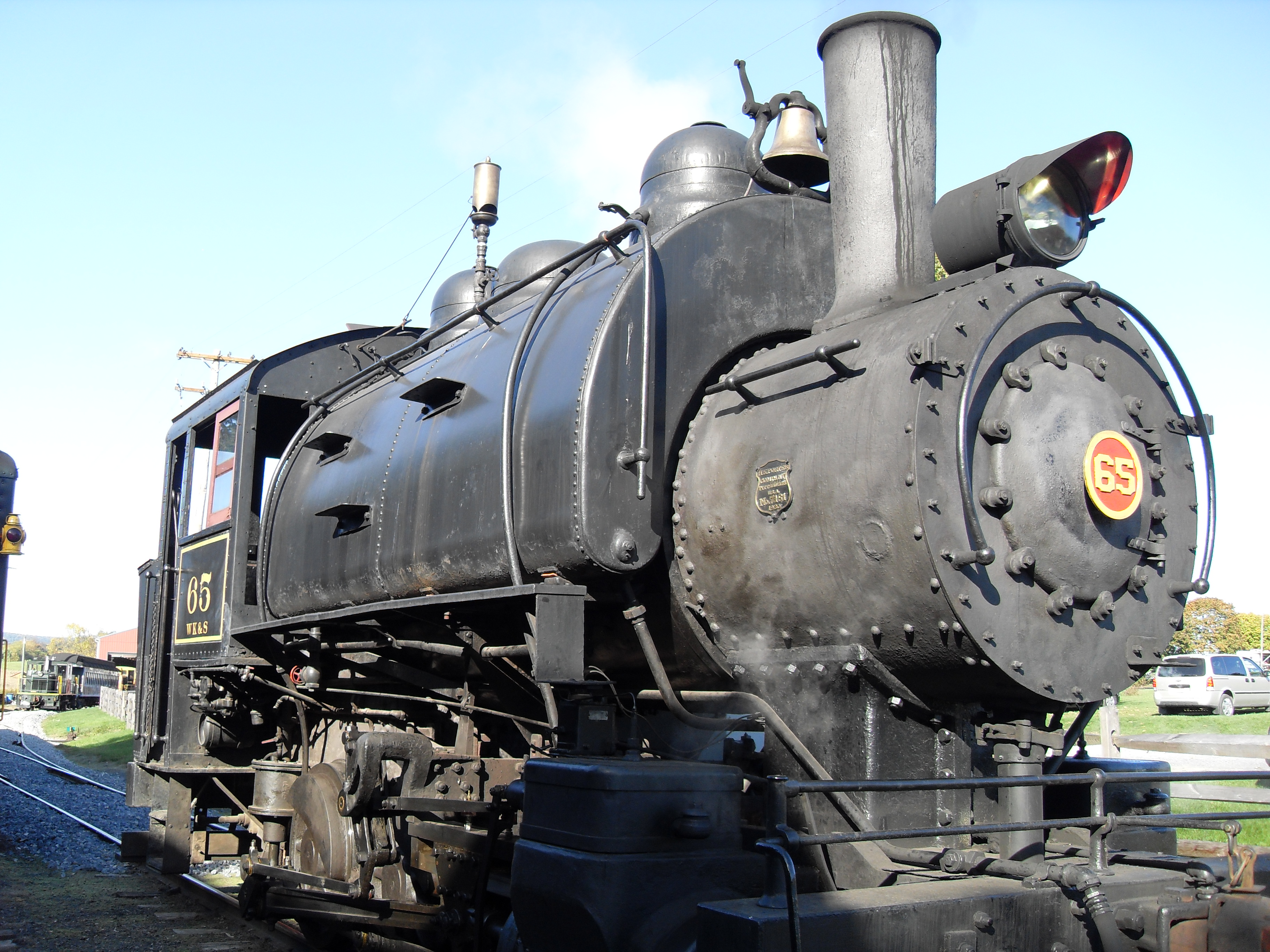
0-6-0 H.K. Porter locomotive, #65

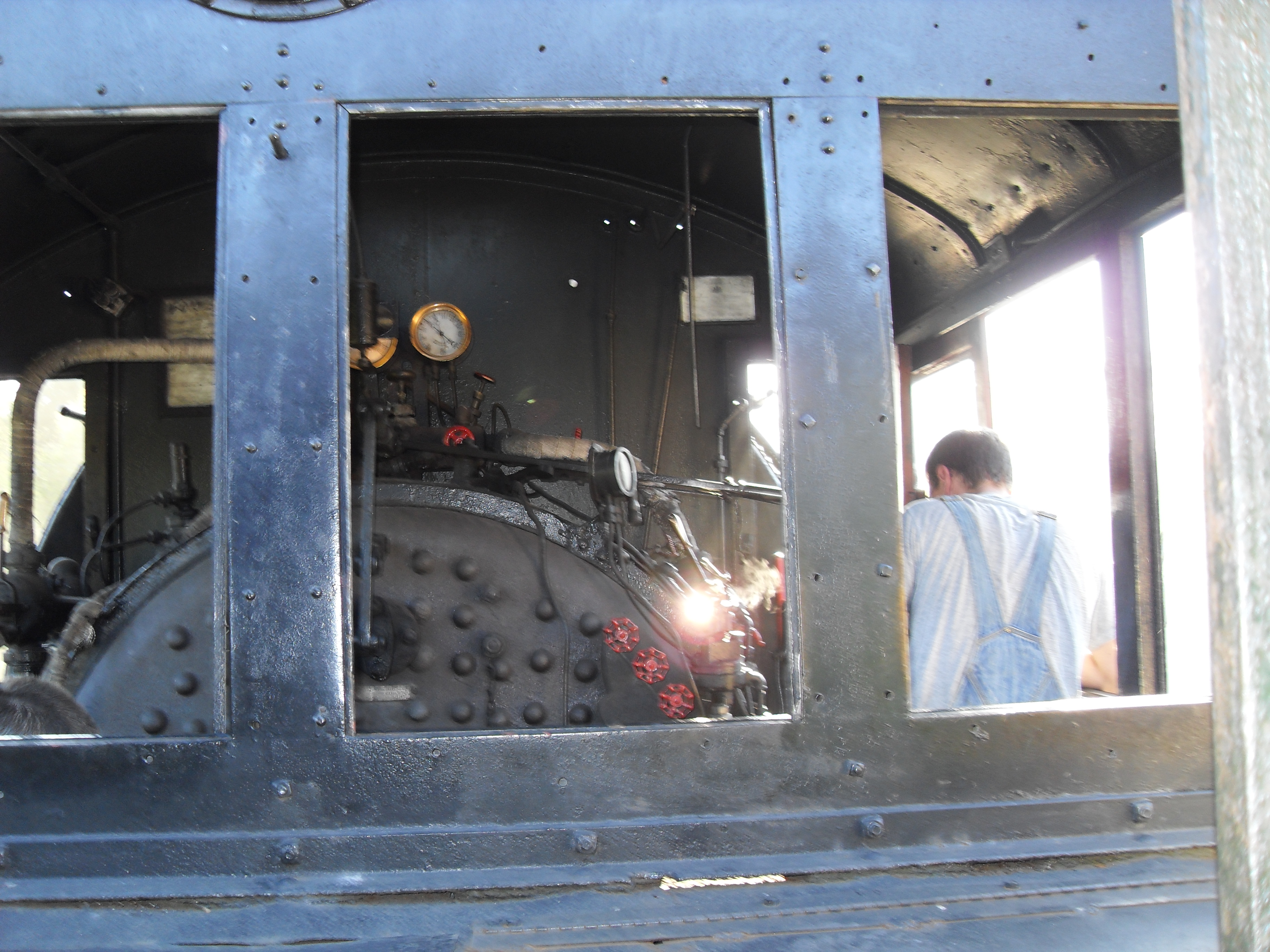
'#65, inside

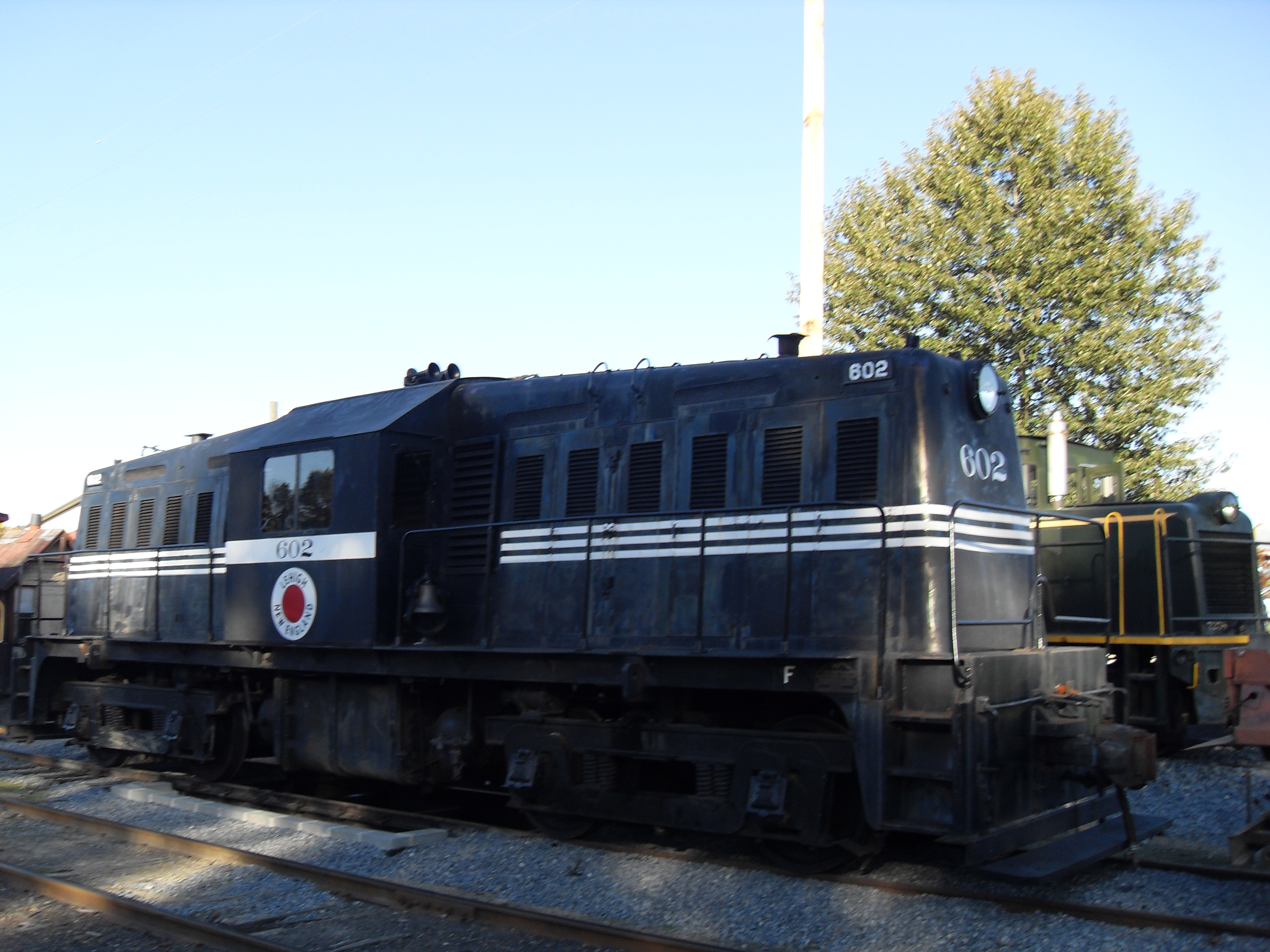
Whitcomb engine

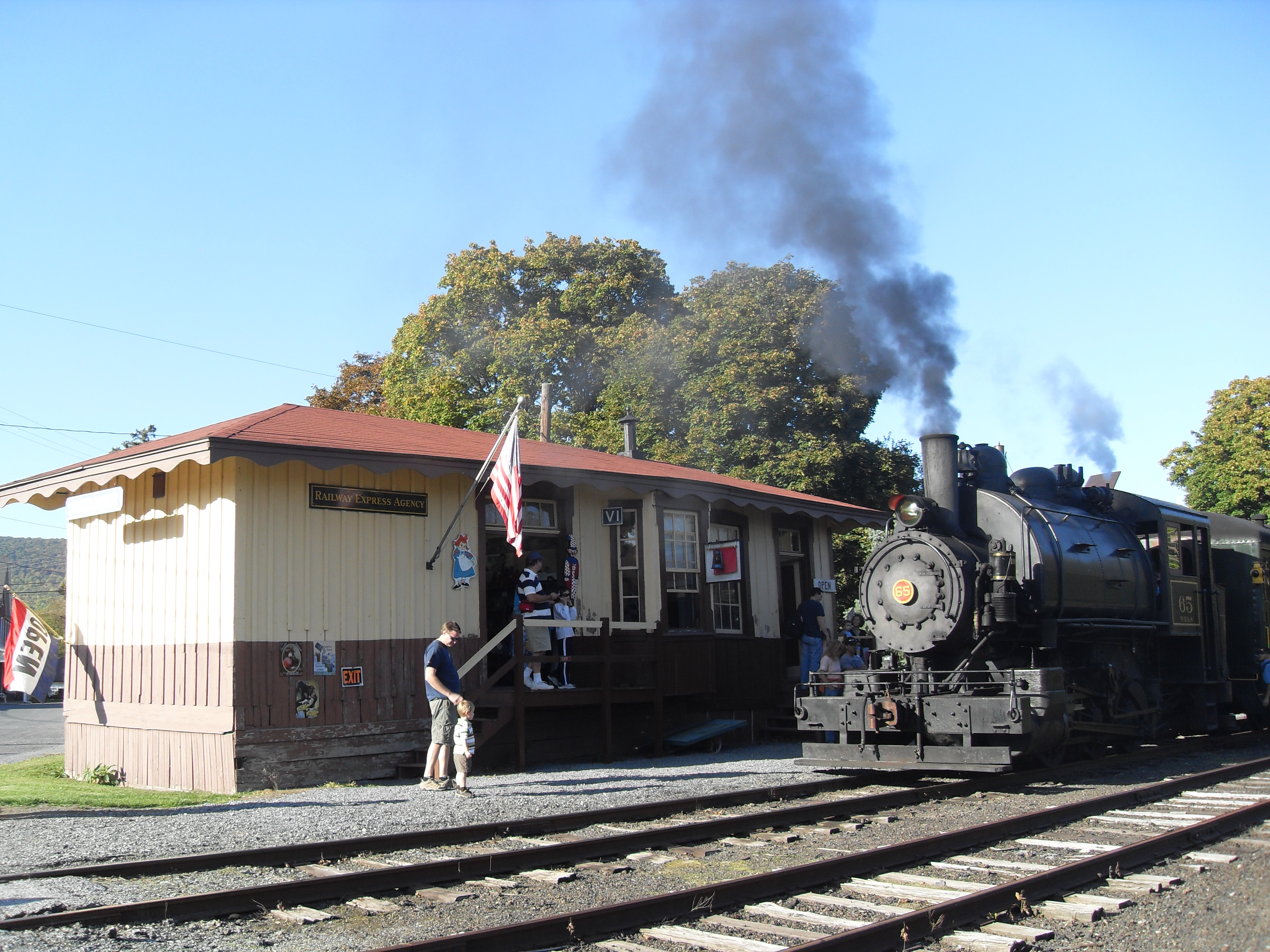
Wanamaker Station

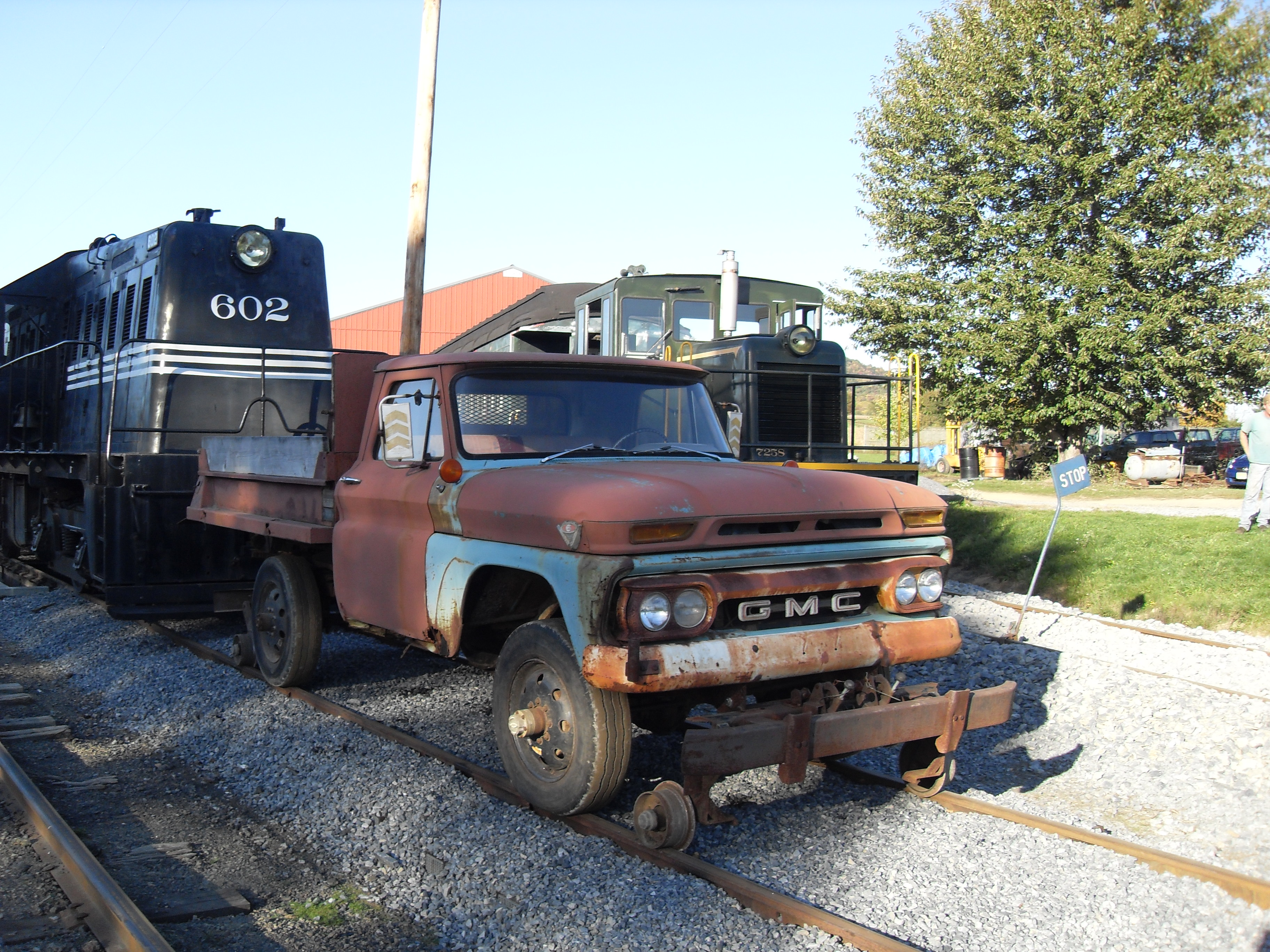
1966 GMC Hyrail truck

== See also ==
- List of heritage railroads in the United States
