= Ontelaunee Creek =

River in Pennsylvania, United States

Coordinates: 40°37′35″N 75°51′19″W

Ontelaunee Creek is a 12.2-mile-long (19.6 km) tributary of Maiden Creek in Berks County, Pennsylvania in the United States. The name "Ontelaunee Creek" is derived from a Native American (Indian) language meaning "maiden creek".

Ontelaunee Creek and Kistler Creek join in the community of Kempton to form Maiden Creek.

== See also ==
- List of rivers of Pennsylvania
