= Kempton, Pennsylvania =

Unincorporated community in Pennsylvania, US

- Census-designated place
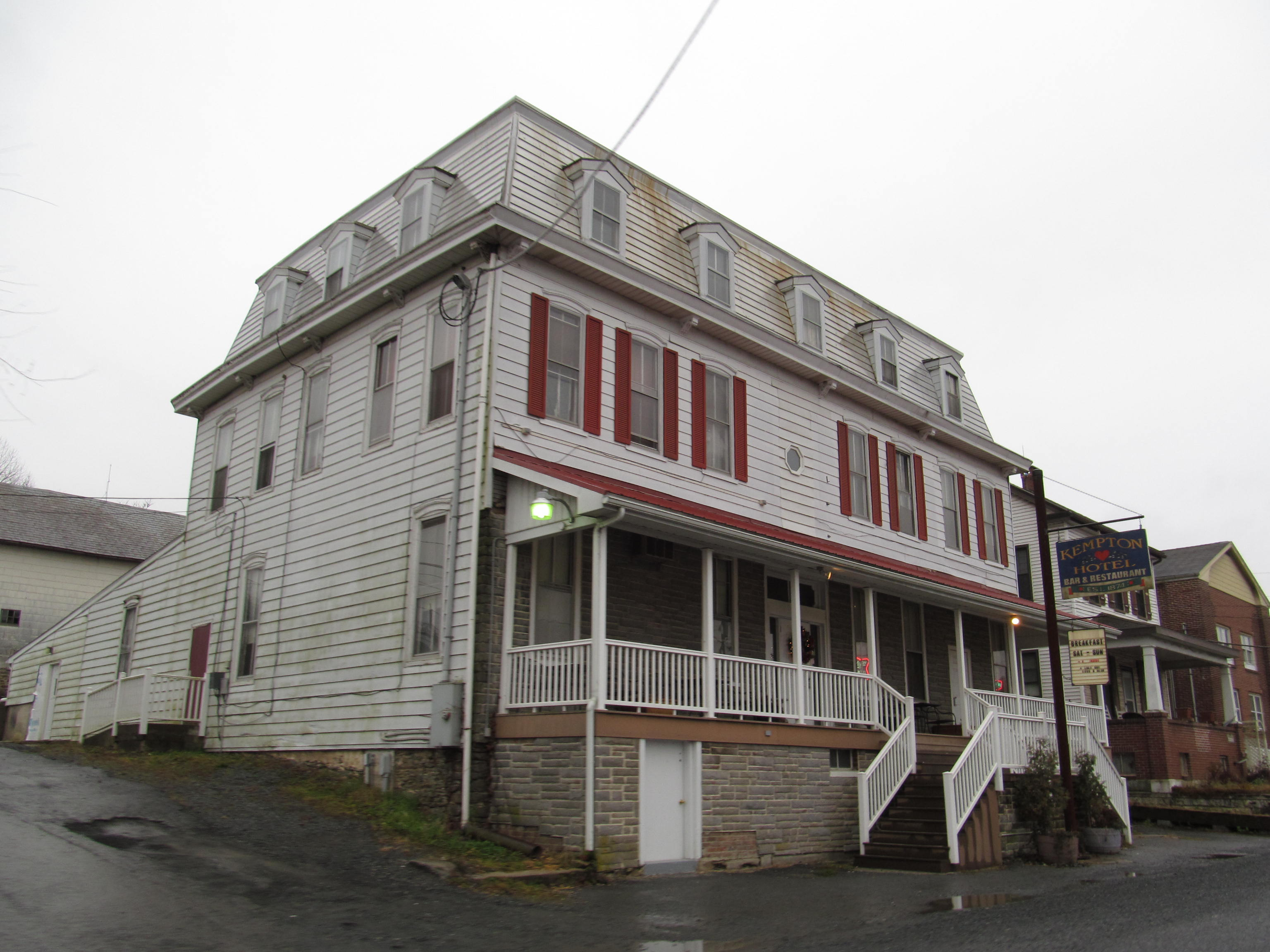
- Kempton Hotel

- Location within Pennsylvania Location within the United States
- Coordinates: 40°37′30″N 75°51′12″W
- Country: United States
- State: Pennsylvania
- County: Berks
- Township: Albany

Area
  - Total: 0.80 sq mi (2.07 km^{2})
  - Land: 0.79 sq mi (2.05 km^{2})
  - Water: 0.0077 sq mi (0.02 km^{2})
- Elevation: 427 ft (130 m)

Population (2020)
  - Total: 159
  - Density: 200.4/sq mi (77.39/km^{2})
- Time zone: UTC-5 (Eastern (EST))
  - Summer (DST): UTC-4 (EDT)
- ZIP code: 19529
- Area codes: 610 and 484
- FIPS code: 42-39224
- GNIS feature ID: 1178350

Kempton is a census-designated place in Albany Township, Berks County, Pennsylvania.

== Demographics ==
Historical population
Census	Pop.	Note	%±
2010	169		—
2020	159		−5.9%
U.S. Decennial Census

== Description ==
Kempton is located at 40.625°N, 75.853°W at the junction of PA Route 737 and Kistler Valley Road. The community is approximately six miles north of the borough of Lenhartsville.

The Kempton Country Fair is held annually in Kempton in June, which features farm animals, farm tools, and vehicles. Tourist attractions in the Kempton area include the Hawk Mountain Sanctuary, WK&S Railroad, Appalachian Trail, Kempton Hotel, and Kempton Community Center. The Community Center hosts the Pennsylvania Renewable Energy Festival annually during the fall.

== Popular culture ==
A postcard of Kempton is featured in the opening introduction of the 1983 film, National Lampoon's Vacation.

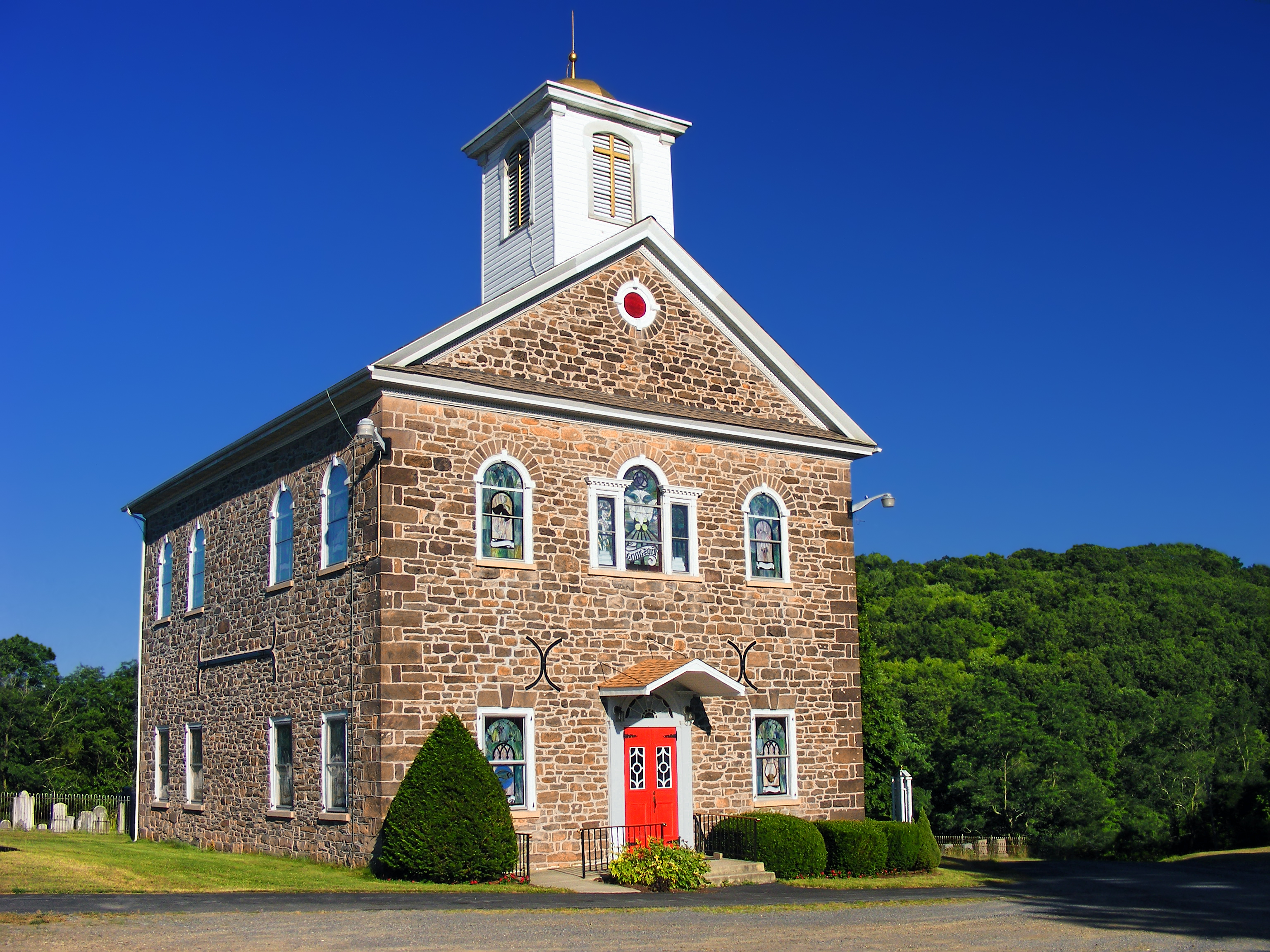
Church in Kempton

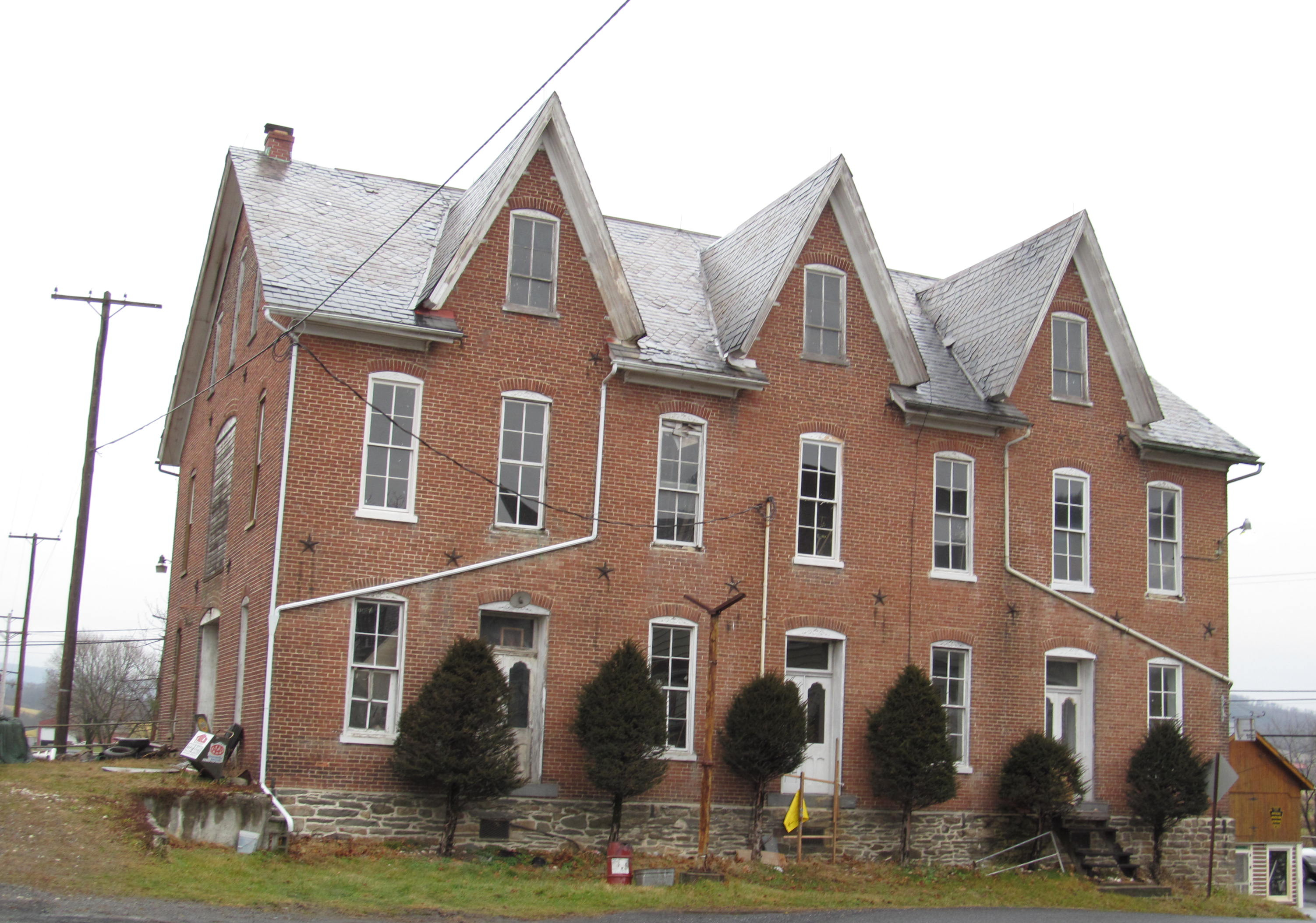

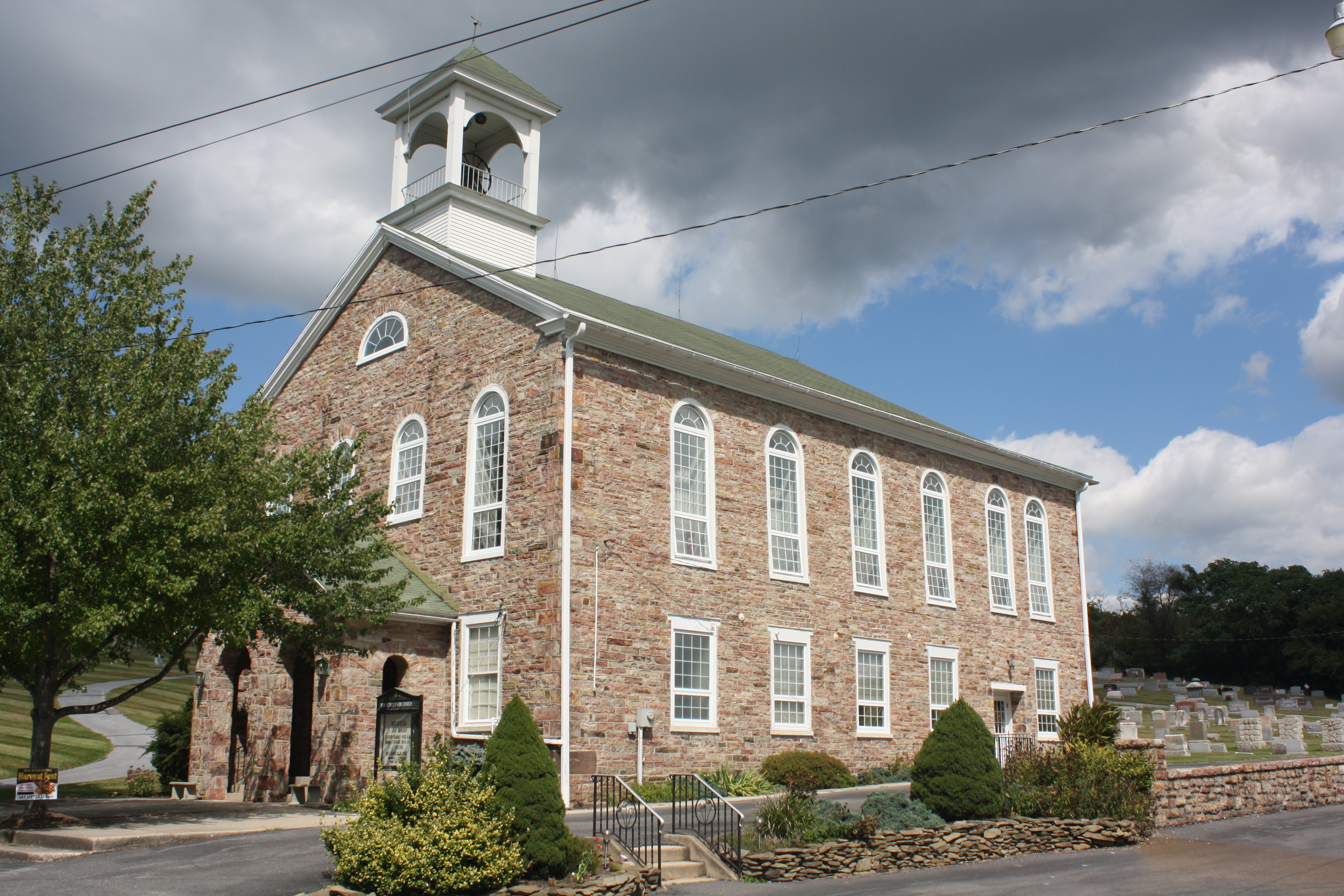
New Bethel Union Church
