= Lease (disambiguation) =

A lease is a type of contractual arrangement.

Lease may also refer to:

== People with the name ==
- Alva Lease Duckwall (1877–1937), American businessman
- Mary Elizabeth Lease (1850–1933), American writer and activist
- Rex Lease (1903–1966), American actor

== Other uses ==
- Lease (computer science)
- Lease Corporation International
- Lease Islands, a group of islands in Indonesia

== See also ==
- Leaser Lake
- Leasing Foundation
- Rent (disambiguation)
- Let (disambiguation)
