= Letts =

Letts may refer to:

== People ==
- Arthur Letts (1862–1923), American businessman, developer of Holmby Hills, Los Angeles, California
- Barry Letts (1925–2009), British actor, television director, producer
- Billie Letts (née Gipson; 1938–2014), American novelist and educator
- David Vanian (born David Letts, 1956), English punk rock musician
- Dennis Letts (1934–2008), American college professor and actor
- Don Letts (born 1956), British film director and musician
- E. A. Letts (1852–1918), English chemist
- Elizabeth Letts (born 1961), American author
- F. Dickinson Letts (1875–1965), American politician and judge
- Goff Letts (1928–2023), Australian politician
- Jack Letts (born 1995), Canadian alleged member of the Islamic State, formerly of dual British-Canadian nationality
- John Letts, multiple persons
- Judge Letts, multiple persons
- Ken Letts, Archdeacon of France from 2007 to 2012
- Michael Letts (born 1985), Australian–Filipino rugby union player
- Quentin Letts (born 1963), British journalist
- Richard Letts (born 1935), music advocate and administrator
- Rose West (née Letts; born 1953), English serial killer
- Tracy Letts (born 1965), American playwright and actor
- Winifred Mary Letts (1882–1972), English-born writer, with Irish connections

== Places ==
- Camp Letts, co-educational summer residence camp and conference center, Maryland
- Letts Valley, California
- Letts, Indiana, United States
- Letts, Iowa, United States

== Other uses ==
- Letts, obsolete for "Latvians", the indigenous people of Latvia
- Letts nitrile synthesis, chemical reaction

== See also ==
- Lets (disambiguation)
