= Let =

Let or LET may refer to:

== Sports ==
- Let serve, when the served object in certain racket sports hits the net and lands in the correct service court, such as;
  - Let (badminton)
  - Let (pickleball)
  - Let (table tennis)
  - Let (tennis)
- Ladies European Tour, the ladies professional golf tour of Europe

== Terminology ==
- -let as an English diminutive suffix
- Let expression, a name binding construct in computer programming languages
- Let statement, a statement used in word problems requiring algebraic equations
- Letting, a system of payment for the temporary use of something owned by someone else, also known as "rental"

== People, titles, characters ==
- Licensed engineering technologist
- Let, a fictional character from the anime series Rave Master

== Places, locations ==
- County Leitrim, Ireland, Chapman code LET
- Let, West Virginia
- Leț, a village in Boroșneu Mare Commune, Covasna County, Romania

== Transportation ==
- Alfredo Vásquez Cobo International Airport (IATA code LET), Leticia, Colombia
- Lei Tung station (station code LET) of the Hong Kong MTR
- Letchworth Garden City railway station (station code LET) of the National Rail

== Groups, organizations, companies ==
- Lashkar-e-Taiba (LeT), a militant Pakistani Islamist organization
- Aircraft Industries, a.s., a Czechoslovak and Czech aircraft manufacturer operating as Let
- LET, part of a font name indicating the font is owned by Letraset; for example, Academy Engraved LET

== Other uses ==
- Linear energy transfer, a property of ionizing radiation's interactions with matter
- Lorentz ether theory, a scientific theory
- LET solution or gel, a topical anesthetic consisting of 4% lidocaine, 1:2,000 epinephrine, and 0.5% tetracaine
- Light-emitting transistor, a future technology
- "Let", a song by Pinegrove from 11:11 (2022)

== See also ==
- lets (disambiguation)
- IET (disambiguation)
- Lease (disambiguation)
- Rent (disambiguation)
