= XtreemFS =

Distributed file system

- Stable release: 1.5.1 / March 12, 2015
- Repository: github.com/xtreemfs/xtreemfs
- Written in: Java
- Operating system: Linux, Windows, Mac OS X
- Type: Distributed file system
- License: New BSD
- Website: www.xtreemfs.org

XtreemFS is an object-based, distributed file system for wide area networks. XtreemFS' outstanding feature is full (all components) and real (all failure scenarios, including network partitions) fault tolerance, while maintaining POSIX file system semantics. Fault-tolerance is achieved by using Paxos-based lease negotiation algorithms and is used to replicate files and metadata. SSL and X.509 certificates support make XtreemFS usable over public networks.

XtreemFS has been under development since early 2007. A first public release was made in August 2008. XtreemFS 1.0 was released in August 2009. The 1.0 release includes support for read-only replication with failover, data center replica maps, parallel reads and writes, and a native Windows client. The 1.1 added automatic on-close replication and POSIX advisory locks. In mid-2011, release 1.3 added read/write replication for files. Version 1.4 underwent extensive testing and is considered production-quality. An improved Hadoop integration and support for SSDs was added in version 1.5.

XtreemFS is funded by the European Commission's IST programme.

The original XtreemFS team founded Quobyte Inc. in 2013. Quobyte offers a professional storage system as a commercial product.

== Features ==
- Secure connections to Contrail (software)
- Clients for Linux, Windows and OS X
- Open source (New BSD License since release 1.3)
- Cross-site file replication with auto-failover
- Partial replicas, objects fetched on demand
- POSIX compatibility
- Plugins for authentication policies, replica selection
- RAID0 (striping) with parallel I/O over stripes
- Read-only replication
- Security (SSL, X.509 certificates)
- Servers for Linux and Solaris Natively and Non-Native Windows Java & ANT based server.
- experimental file system driver for Hadoop (added in version 1.2)

== Use cases ==
- as a filer replacement (home directories and group shares),
- in HPC cluster,
- in Hadoop clusters,
- for VM block storage
- cross-branch data sharing
- and many more use cases, all in a single system.

== See also ==
- List of file systems, the distributed parallel fault-tolerant file system section
- Grid computing
- XtreemOS
- BeeGFS
