= Lets =

Lets or variation may refer to:

- let's (vocabulary)
- Local exchange trading system
- Lunar Exploration Transportation Services, the NASA follow-on program to the Human Landing System
- Linear Energy Transfer Spectrometer, an instrument on the failed lunar lander Peregrine Mission One
- Low-Energy Telescope System, a part of the Cosmic Ray Subsystem on the Voyager spacecraft
- Suzuki Let's motorscooter
- Let's! TV Play Classic, the Let's brand of TV game consoles
- Let's, a popular fictional company present across various films and television series

== See also ==
- Let (disambiguation)
- IETS
- Letts (disambiguation)
