= Lynn, Pennsylvania =

Lynn, Pennsylvania can refer to the following places in the U.S. commonwealth of Pennsylvania:

- Lynn, Susquehanna County, Pennsylvania, an historic community now part of Springville in Susquehanna County
- Lynn Township, Pennsylvania, a township in Lehigh County, Pennsylvania
