= Rent =

Rent may refer to:

== Economics ==
- Renting, an agreement where a payment is made for the temporary use of a good, service or property
- Economic rent, any payment in excess of the cost of production
- Rent-seeking, attempting to increase one's share of existing wealth without creating wealth
- Rentboy or rent boy, a male prostitute

== Entertainment ==
- Rent (musical), a stage musical by Jonathan Larson
  - Rent (film), a 2005 movie version of the musical
  - Rent: Filmed Live on Broadway, 2008 film of the final Broadway performance of the musical
- Rent (MUD), a game mechanic in some MUDs
- "Rent" (song), a 1987 pop music hit from the Pet Shop Boys
- "Rent", a song by Lights from Pep
- Gross rentals, also known as distributor rentals, the distributor's share of a film's theatrical revenue at the box office
- Mark Renton, also known as "Rents", the protagonist of Trainspotting and its film adaptations

== See also ==
- Rental (disambiguation)
- Rentier (disambiguation)
- Lease (disambiguation)
- Let (disambiguation)
