= Remi Gribonval =

Remi Gribonval from the INRIA, Rennes Cedex, France was named Fellow of the Institute of Electrical and Electronics Engineers (IEEE) in 2014 for contributions to the theory and applications of sparse signal processing.
