= Leasing Foundation =

UK-based foundation

The Leasing Foundation
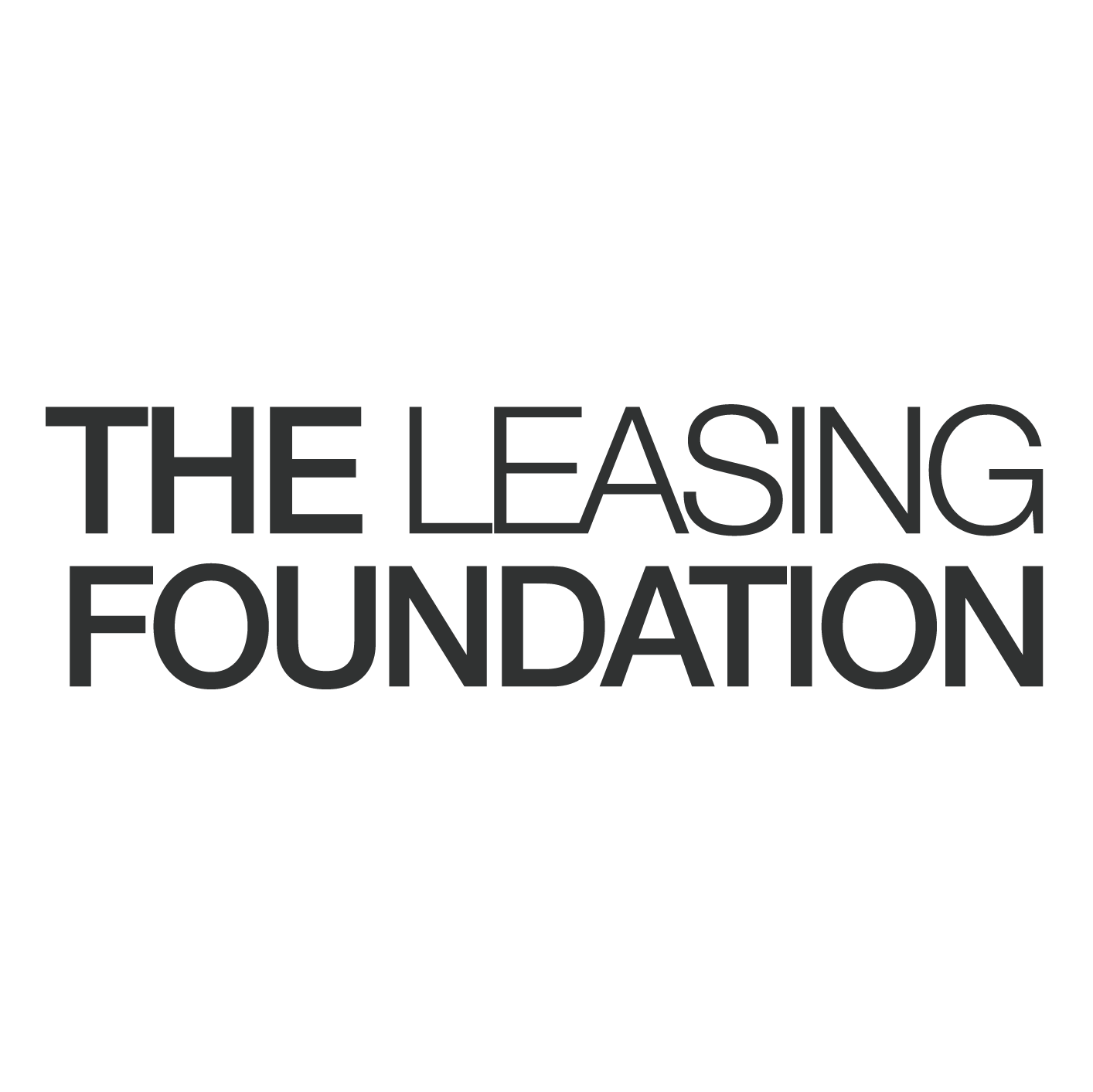
- The Leasing Foundation
- Founded: 2012; 14 years ago
- Founder: Andrew Denton, Peter J. Thomas
- Type: Non-profit organisation
- Purpose: Leasing and asset finance
- Location(s): London, EC2; United Kingdom
- Region served: Europe, Asia, Africa
- Products: Leasing Foundation Fellows, Diversity and Inclusion, The Asset Finance Observatory, The Leasing Foundation Future Leaders, MA Leasing Asset Finance, Young Business Finance Professionals, The Certified Business Finance Professional (CBFP).
- Services: industry research, education, training, professional development, philanthropy
- Members: c. 150
- Key people: Andrew Denton (co-founder), Carol Roberts (Chair), Peter Thomas (co-founder).
- Website: leasingfoundation.org

The Leasing Foundation (The Leasing Industry Philanthropic and Research Foundation Limited), established in 2012, is a non-profit organisation based in the City of London.

== Mission ==
The mission of The Leasing Foundation is to support the business finance industry through personal and professional developments.

== Directors and Fellows ==
The Directors of the Leasing Foundation represent organisations including Lombard, Siemens Financial Services, Hitachi, Alfa, Aldermore, 1pm, Metro Bank, Wesleyan, Simply Asset Finance, Ricoh Europe and Locke Lord. The patron of the Leasing Foundation is Jonathan Andrew, Group Chief Executive, Siemens Financial Services. The Foundation has over 150 Fellows (as of February 2018) representing finance organisations from across Europe.
