= Augustus Frederick Sherman =

American photographer (1865–1925)

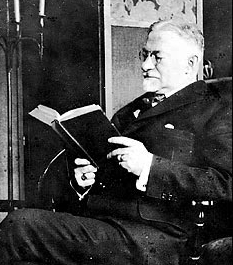
- Born: July 9, 1865; Lynn Township, Pennsylvania, U.S.
- Died: February 16, 1925 (aged 59); New York City, U.S.
- Resting place: Pennsylvania, U.S.
- Occupations: clerical administrator, Ellis Island; amateur photographer
- Employer: U.S. Bureau of Immigration
- Title: Chief Clerk

Augustus Frederick Sherman (July 9, 1865 – February 16, 1925) was an American clerk and photographer. He worked in senior clerical positions at Ellis Island. He was there briefly in 1893 as a clerk in the Executive Division; and permanently, in more senior positions, from 1895 to 1925. He was division chief, with the title of chief clerk, 1909–1921; and, finally, confidential secretary to the Commissioner, 1921–1925.

In 1916, in the absence of the Commissioner and the Assistant Commissioner, Sherman took over routine affairs on the island, as he was regarded as third in command. He was an untrained, yet highly gifted photographer who created hundreds of images documenting the new arrivals to America. Sherman was fascinated by the diverse origins and cultural backgrounds of his subjects, and created a series of portraits offering viewers a perspective on this period in American history.

== Early life and education ==
Sherman was born on July 9, 1865, in Lynn, Pennsylvania. He was of English descent on both sides of his family and was a member of the Protestant Episcopal Church. His father, Henry Nathaniel Sherman (1832-1887), was a commission merchant; his mother was Estella Theresa Sherman, née Handrick, (1838-1912). Augustus was graduated from high school in Wilkes-Barre, Pennsylvania.

== Career ==
In 1884, he relocated to New York City to join his older brother, Henry Handrick Sherman (1860-1918); both pursued careers as clerks in the Democratic Party's Tammany Hall political machine.

In 1887, Augustus was private secretary to John R. Voorhis (1829-1932), a prominent Tammany politician and former New York City Police commissioner. In 1893, Sherman was hired as a clerk under Ellis Island's Democratic immigration commissioner, Joseph H. Senner. He later left after being appointed private secretary to the New York City Police Commissioner, a position he held from 1893 to December 1894.

In January 1895, he entered federal service in the Bureau of Immigration as a senior stenographer at Ellis Island, succeeding his brother there. During his years as chief clerk of Ellis Island he was in charge of the station's large clerical staff as well as its extensive correspondence. He also supervised immigrant appeals to the Commissioner made by those who had been excluded from entry by a board of special inquiry.

== Photographic work ==
Sherman took photographs from about 1904 until 1924. Considering the state of the art of photography in that era, with long exposures and huge box cameras, the fact he was able to capture so many images during his working life is noteworthy.

Sherman took photographs of families, groups, and individuals who were being detained either for medical reasons or for further interrogation.

In some cases, such as his images of a gypsy family, the subjects of photographs were deported. Over the course of his career at Ellis Island, Sherman took more than 200 pictures, often encouraging his subjects to open their suitcases and put on their elaborate national costumes or folk dress. He captured images of Romanian shepherds, German stowaways, circus performers and women from Guadeloupe.

Sherman's photographs were not taken in an official capacity, but they were used by immigration officials to promote the work of Ellis Island. They were published in some of the annual reports of the Commissioner General of Immigration and provided by Ellis Island Commissioner William Williams to The New York Times to promote William's work at Ellis Island. Sherman's photograph collections are housed at the Ellis Island Immigration Museum and the New York Public Library.

On July 4, 2008, the Minnesota History Center opened a new exhibit celebrating the human story of the more than twelve million immigrants who entered the United States through the federal immigration station. The exhibit features 75 framed black-and-white photographs reflecting the cultural and ethnic diversity of people arriving at the beginning of the 20th century.

William Williams papers / Photographs of immigrants
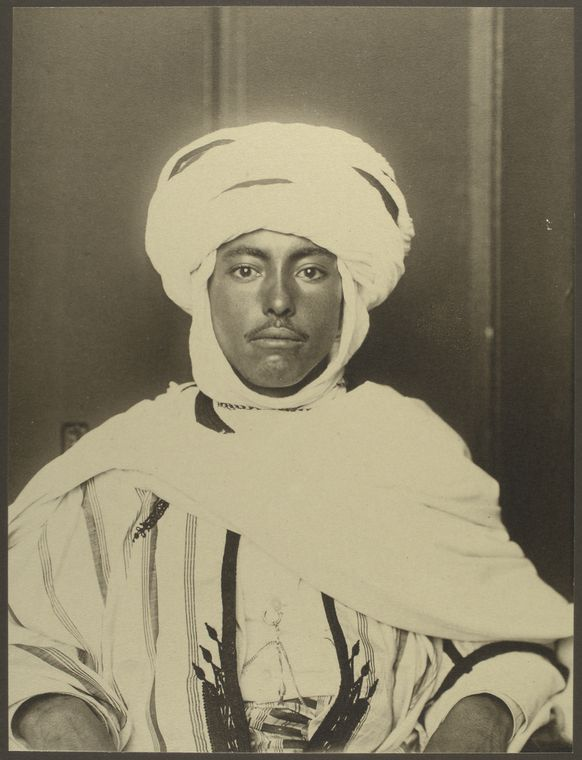
Algerian immigrant

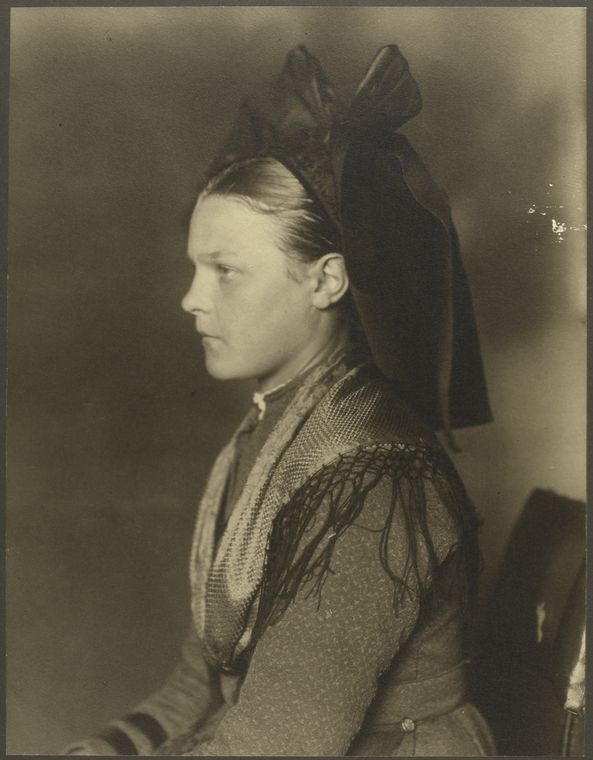
Girl from the Kochersberg region near Strasbourg, Alsace

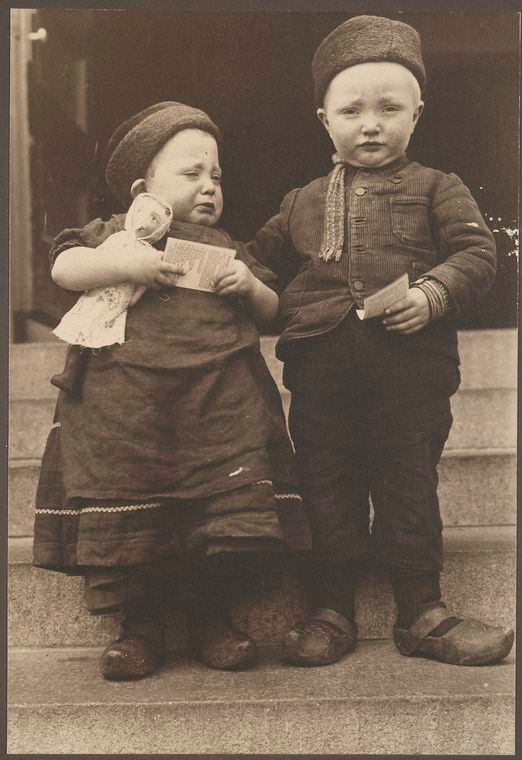
Dutch siblings from the Island of Marken, holding religious tracts

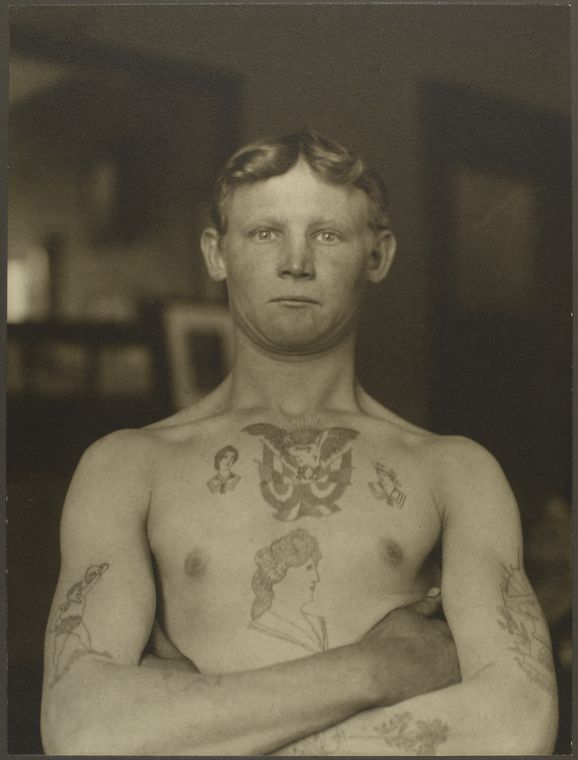
Tattooed German stowaways deported May, 1911

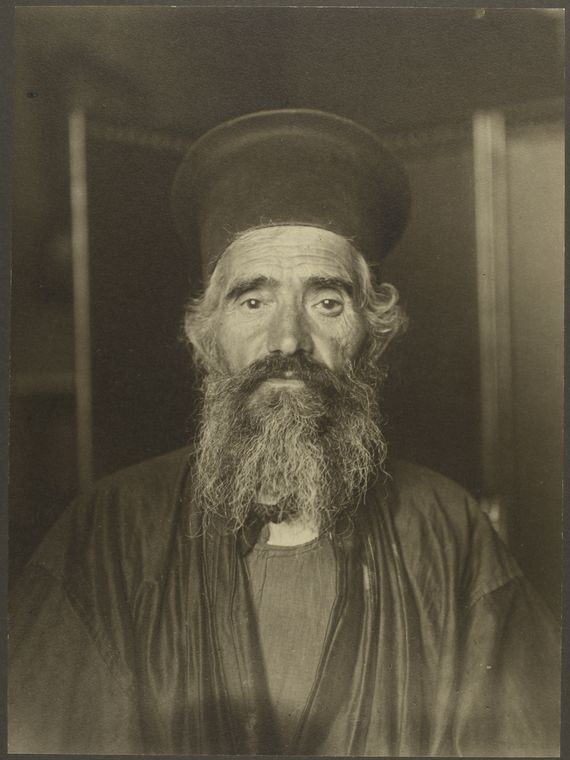
Rev. Joseph Vasilon, Greek-Orthodox priest
