= Medicine Unboxed =

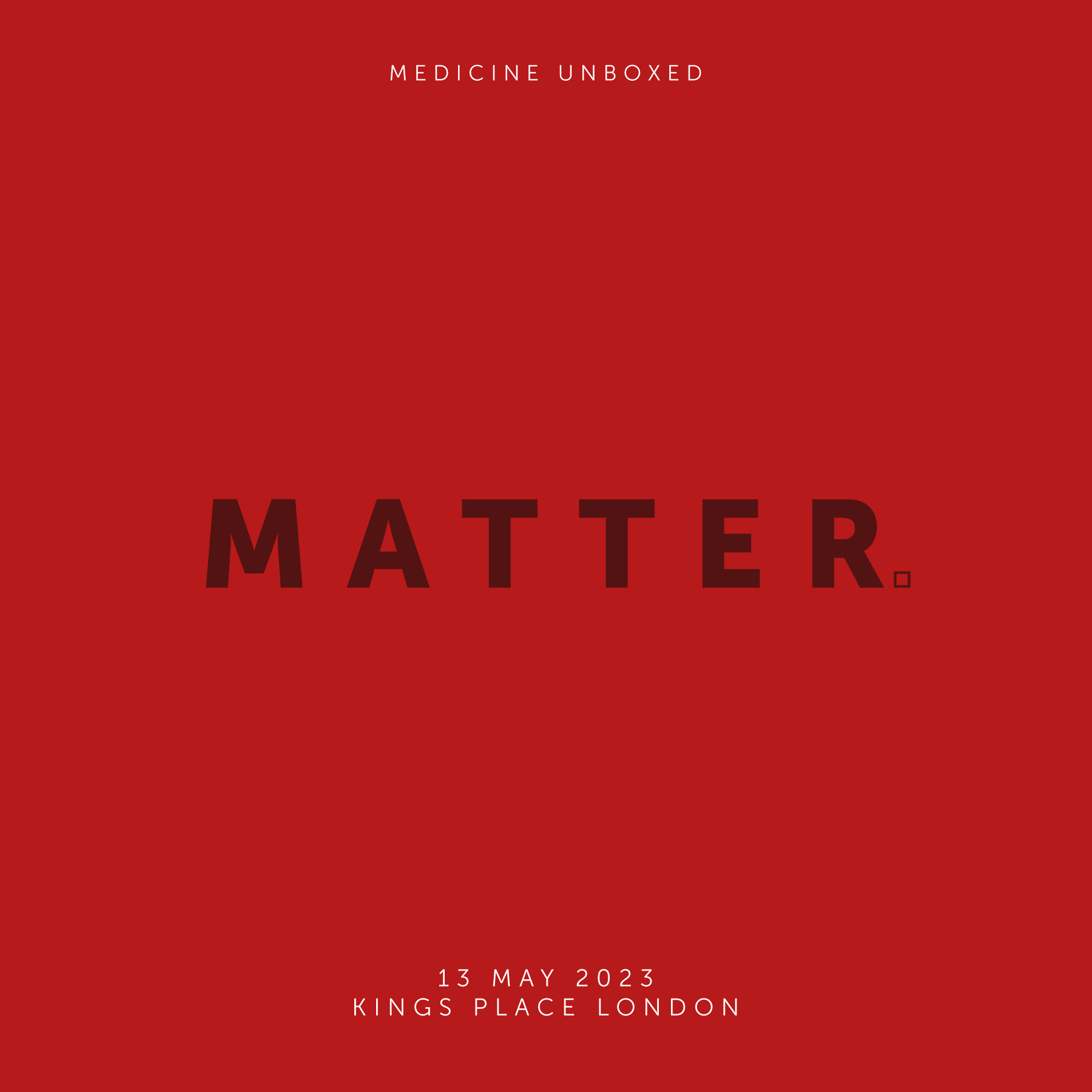
- Medicine Unboxed 2023: MATTER event poster.
- Date: November
- Begins: 2009
- Frequency: annual
- Venue: Parabola Arts Centre, Cheltenham, UK
- Locations: Cheltenham, UK
- Founder: Dr. Samir Guglani
- Most recent: Medicine Unboxed 2018:love
- Attendance: 1600
- Area: international
- Patrons: Jo Shapcott, Raymond Tallis
- Organiser: Medicine Unboxed
- People: Samir Guglani (Curator), Peter Thomas (Creative Director)
- Website: https://medicineunboxed.org
- Medicine Unboxed is supported by the Wellcome Foundation, The Arts Council, Gloucestershire Hospitals NHS Foundation Trust, and The Summerfield Trust.

Medicine Unboxed is a project arising from a view that good medicine demands more than scientific and technical expertise, and that it necessitates ethical judgment, an understanding of human experience, empathy, professionalism and wisdom.

== History ==
Medicine Unboxed is a not-for-profit organisation that has held ten international conferences (Unboxing Medicine, 2009; Stories, Language and Medicine, 2010; Medicine and Values, 2011; Belief, 2012; Voice, 2013; Frontiers, 2014; Mortality, 2015; Wonder, 2016; MAPS, 2017; LOVE, 2018) in Cheltenham, UK.

The aim of Medicine Unboxed is to explore understanding medicine through the arts and humanities and engage the public and front-line National Health Service staff with a view of medicine that is infused and elaborated by the humanitiesand promote dialogue about the goals and values of medicine within society. Contributors to the conferences include artists, writers, the clergy, poets, philosophers, lawyers, linguists, musicians, ethicists, academics and doctors.

Medicine Unboxed is curated by Dr. Sam Guglani, Consultant Oncologist at Gloucestershire Hospitals NHS Foundation Trust, which supports the organisation, along with the Wellcome Trust and The Arts Council. The Creative Director is Peter Thomas. Its advisors are Dr. Sean Elyan and Dame Janet Trotter and its patrons are Jo Shapcott and Raymond Tallis.

Medicine Unboxed has been widely reported in the medical press including The Guardian, The Lancet, The British Medical Journal Online and Lapidus.

Following a move to a larger venue at the Parabola Arts Centre, Cheltenham, the third event in the Medicine Unboxed series was Medicine and Values, which took place on 15 October 2011 and included contributions by Lionel Shriver, Jo Shapcott, Revd. John Bell, Raymond Tallis, John Carey, Paul Bailey, Michael Arditti, Havi Carel and Tom Isaacs (of The Cure Parkinson's Trust).

In 2012, the Medicine Unboxed theme was Belief. Contributors included Sebastian Faulks, John Burnside, Marius Brill, Bryan Appleyard, Rupert Sheldrake, Tim Parks, Richard Holloway, Iona Heath, Matthew Flinders, Richard Horton, Clare Short, Darian Leader, Raymond Tallis, Jo Shapcott, Jan Royall, Jane Macnaughton, Adam Kay, Charles Fernyhough and Rhidian Brook. Medicine Unboxed 2012: belief took place on November 24–25, 2012 at the Parabola Arts Centre in Cheltenham.

In 2013, the theme of Medicine Unboxed was Voice, and the event took place on 23–24 November 2013. Speakers included: Andrew Motion, Jocelyn Pook, Roger Kneebone, Eleanor Longden, Fi Glover, Jackie Kay, Bobby Baker, Melanie Pappenheim, Charlotte Blease, Deborah Bowman, Rebecca Askew, Eduardo Miranda, Allyson Pollock, Jo Shapcott, Rhys Morgan, Julian Baggini, Richard Bentall, Charles Fernyhough, Roger Taylor, Bob Heath, Birmingham Medical School Choir and Raymond Tallis.

In 2014, Medicine Unboxed explored Frontiers. The event took place on 22–23 November 2014 at the Parabola Arts Centre in Cheltenham. Those appearing included Camilla Batmenjelidgh, Sophie de Oliveira Barata, Richard Horton, Philip Gross, Christopher Potter, William Fiennes, Jackie Kay, Iain McGilchrist, Daljit Nagra, Sarah Moss, Gabriel Weston, Joanna Bourke, Melanie Pappenheim, Philip Hoare, Tim Dee, Yasmin Gunaratnam, Susan Aldworth, Bob Heath, Iona Heath, Raymond Tallis, Jo Shapcott, Deborah Bowman, Tom de Freston and Roger Kneebone. In 2014 Medicine Unboxed awarded the inaugural Medicine Unboxed Creative Prize, a single prize of £10,000 for a creative work that illuminates the relationship between the arts and medicine. The winner was poet Tiffany Atkinson for her series of poems called 'Dolorimeter'. The prize was sponsored by D&D Leasing.

In 2015, Medicine Unboxed explored Mortality. The event took place on 21–22 November 2015 at the Parabola Arts Centre in Cheltenham. Those appearing included Nick Lane, Peter Stanford, Jay Carver, Henry Marsh, Allan Kellehear, Marion Coutts, Jane Draycott, Rebecca Goss, Jo Shapcott, Dave Goulson, Sue Black, Raymond Tallis, Salley Vickers, Tom de Freston, Rhidian Brook, Michael Symmons Roberts, Julian Baggini, Bob Heath, Katie Sidle, Peter Thomas, Rob George, Iona Heath, Paul McMaster, Sean Elyan, Ann Wroe and Sam Guglani. In 2015, The Medicine Unboxed Creative Prize was won by French photographer Christian Berthelot for his 'CESAR' series of images taken immediately after the birth of babies born by cesarean section. The prize was sponsored by D&D Leasing UK and Bibby Leasing.

In 2016, the eighth in the Medicine Unboxed series of events explored the theme of wonder on 19–20 November 2016. Speakers include Roger Penrose, Michel Faber, Gavin Francis, James Rhodes, David Almond, Lavinia Greenlaw, Gaia Vince, Max Porter, Vahni Capildeo, Lynsey Hanley, Helen Pearson, Caspar Henderson, Jon Copley, David Nicholl, Joe May, Robert Beckford, Paul Fletcher, Phil Hammond and Anil Seth.

In 2017 the ninth conference in the series is themed Maps. Speakers include Liz Berry, Sarah Perry, Denise Riley, Sarah Wheeler, Lara Pawson, Kate Clanchy, Mona Arshi, Eimar McBride, David Mitchell, Philip Marsden, Danny Dorling, Laurence Rees, Tim Dee, Mark O’Connell, Caspar Henderson, Richard Horton, Sheldon Thomas and David Nott.

In 2018 the tenth conference in the series was entitled Love. Speakers included Eley Williams, Jason Barker, Will Eaves, Xaffar Kunial, Daniel Locke, Helen Jukes, Nina Conti and Max Porter.

In 2023 the theme of Medicine Unboxed will be MATTER and the event will be held on 13 May at Kings Place, London.

== Events ==
- 2009 Unboxing Medicine
- 2010 Stories, Language and Medicine
- 2011 Medicine and Values
- 2012 Belief
- 2013 Voice
- 2014 Frontiers
- 2015 Mortality
- 2016 Wonder
- 2017 Maps
- 2018 Love
- 2023 MATTER
