= Personal and Ubiquitous Computing =

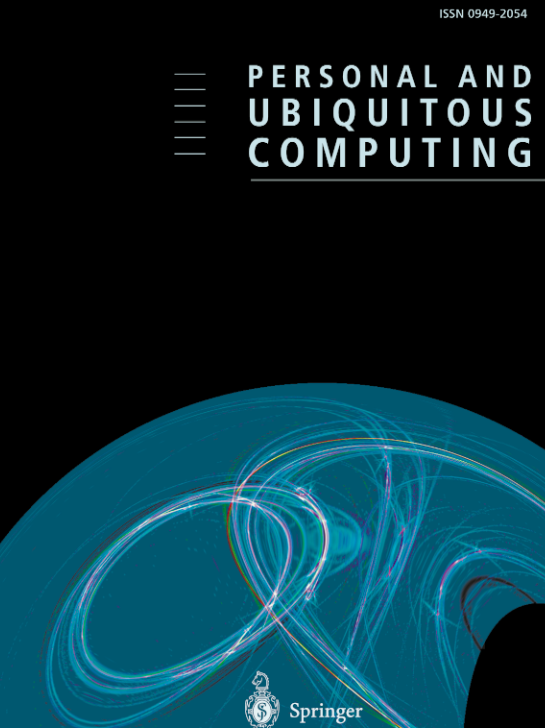
- Discipline: Ubiquitous computing
- Language: English

Publication details
- Former name(s): Personal Technologies
- History: 1997–present
- Publisher: Springer Science+Business Media
- Frequency: Bimonthly
- Open access: Partly
- License: CC-BY-NC 2.5

Standard abbreviations
- ISO 4: Pers. Ubiquitous Comput.

Indexing
- ISSN: 1617-4909 (print); 1617-4917 (web)

Links
- Journal homepage; Online access

Personal and Ubiquitous Computing is a peer-reviewed scientific journal that was established in 1997. It covers original research on ubiquitous and pervasive computing, ambient intelligence, and wearable and mobile information devices, with a focus on user experience and interaction design issues. The journal publishes a mixture of issues themed on specific topics, or organised around scientific workshops, and original research papers.

The journal was founded by former editor-in-chief Peter Thomas. The journal is published by Springer Nature.

== Abstracting and indexing ==
The journal is abstracted and indexed in Academic OneFile, Academic Search, Compendex, Computer Science Index, Current Abstracts, Current Contents/Engineering, Computing and Technology, Digital Bibliography & Library Project, Ergonomics Abstracts, Inspec, io-port.net, Science Citation Index Expanded, and Scopus.

According to Journal Citation Reports, the journal has a 2020 impact factor of 3.006.
