= Wanamakers, Pennsylvania =

Unincorporated community in Pennsylvania, US

- Unincorporated community
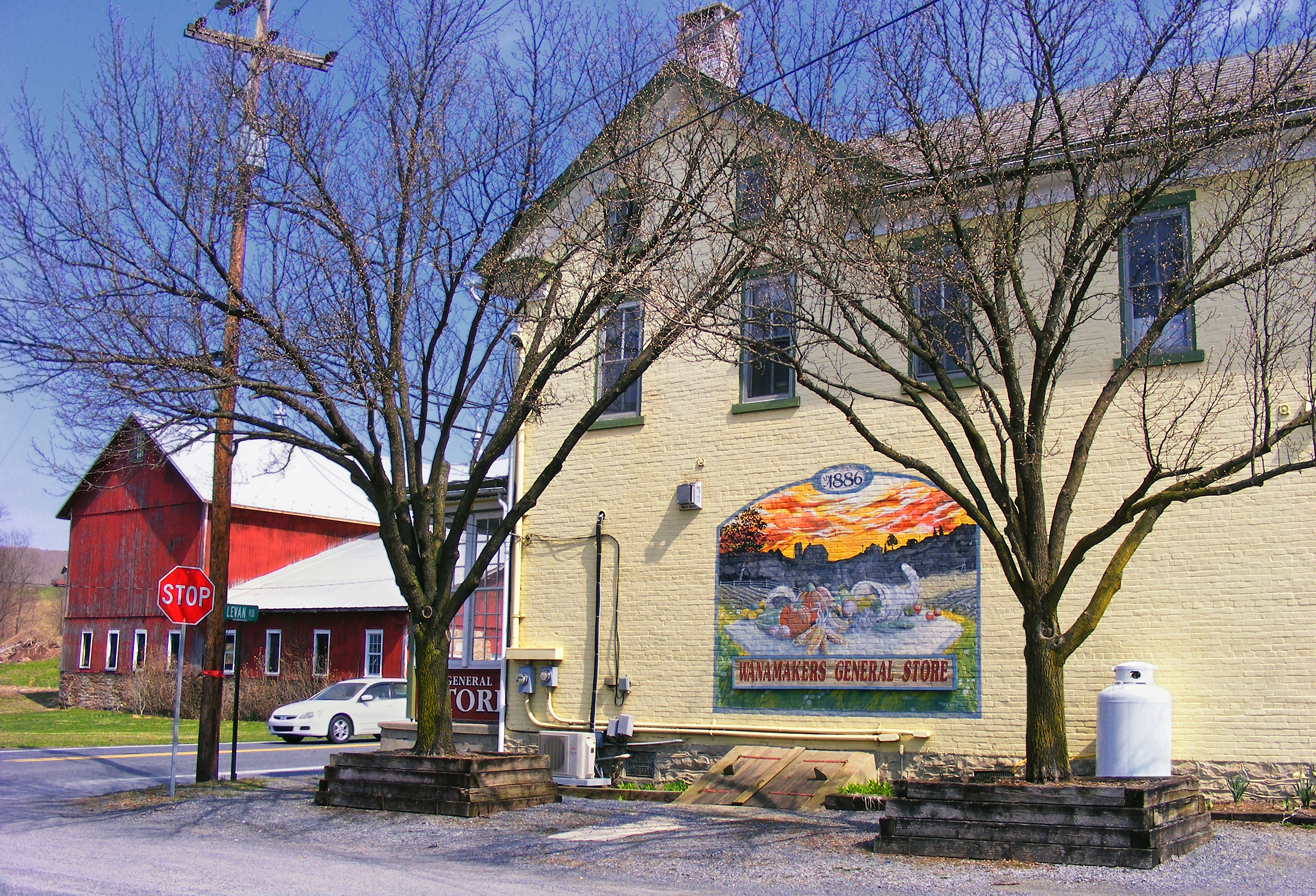
- Wanamakers General Store

- Location within Pennsylvania Location within the United States
- Coordinates: 40°39′39″N 75°50′45″W
- Country: United States
- State: Pennsylvania
- County: Lehigh
- Township: Lynn
- Elevation: 440 ft (130 m)

Population
  - Metro: 865,310 (US: 68th)
- Time zone: UTC-5 (Eastern (EST))
  - Summer (DST): UTC-4 (EDT)
- Area codes: 610 and 484
- GNIS feature ID: 1190576

Wanamakers is an unincorporated community in Lynn Township in Lehigh County, Pennsylvania. It is part of the Lehigh Valley, which has a population of 861,899 and is the 68th-most populous metropolitan area in the U.S. as of the 2020 census.

Wanamakers is located at the intersection of Pennsylvania Route 143 and Steinsville Road.
