= Rentier =

Rentier may refer to:

- Rentier capitalism, economic practices of gaining profit by monopolizing access to property
- Rentier state, a state which derives national revenues from the rent of indigenous resources
- Operation Rentier, a German military operation in Finland in World War II

== See also ==
- Rent (disambiguation)
