= Jacksonville, Lehigh County, Pennsylvania =

Unincorporated community in Pennsylvania, US

- Unincorporated community
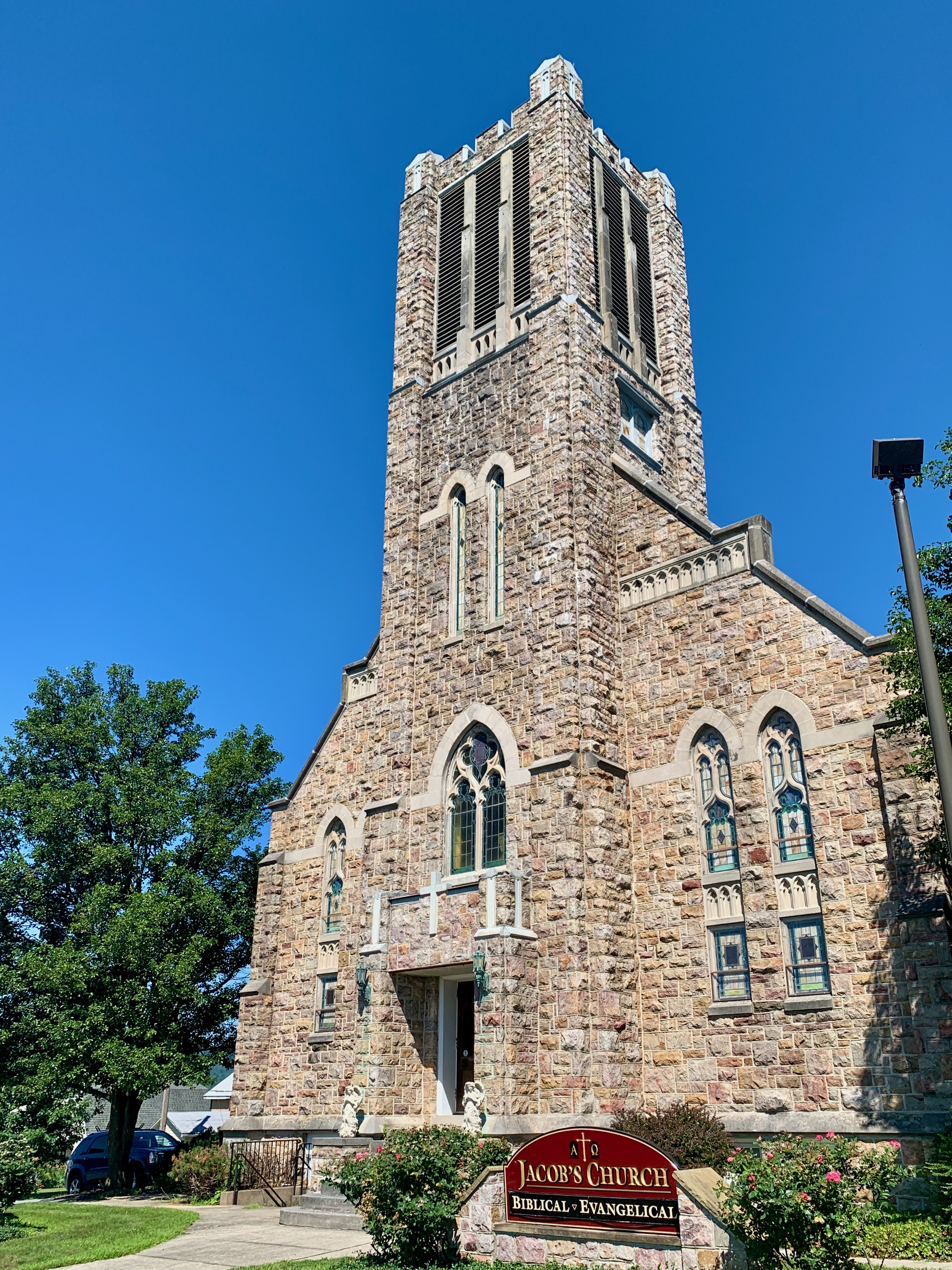
- Jacob's Church in Jacksonville, Pennsylvania

- Location within Pennsylvania Location within the United States
- Coordinates: 40°40′15″N 75°49′43″W
- Country: United States
- State: Pennsylvania
- County: Lehigh
- Township: Lynn
- Founded: 1820
- Named after: Andrew Jackson
- Elevation: 518 ft (158 m)

Population
  - Metro: 865,310 (US: 68th)
- Time zone: UTC-5 (Eastern (EST))
  - Summer (DST): UTC-4 (EDT)
- ZIP Code: 19529
- GNIS feature ID: 1177939

Jacksonville is an unincorporated community that is located in Lynn Township in Lehigh County, Pennsylvania. It is part of the Lehigh Valley, which has a population of 861,899 and was the 68th-most populous metropolitan area in the U.S. as of the 2020 census.

== History ==
After land was donated for a church and churchyard, the first house was built in 1820. The village was named after President Andrew Jackson in 1845.

== Points of interest ==
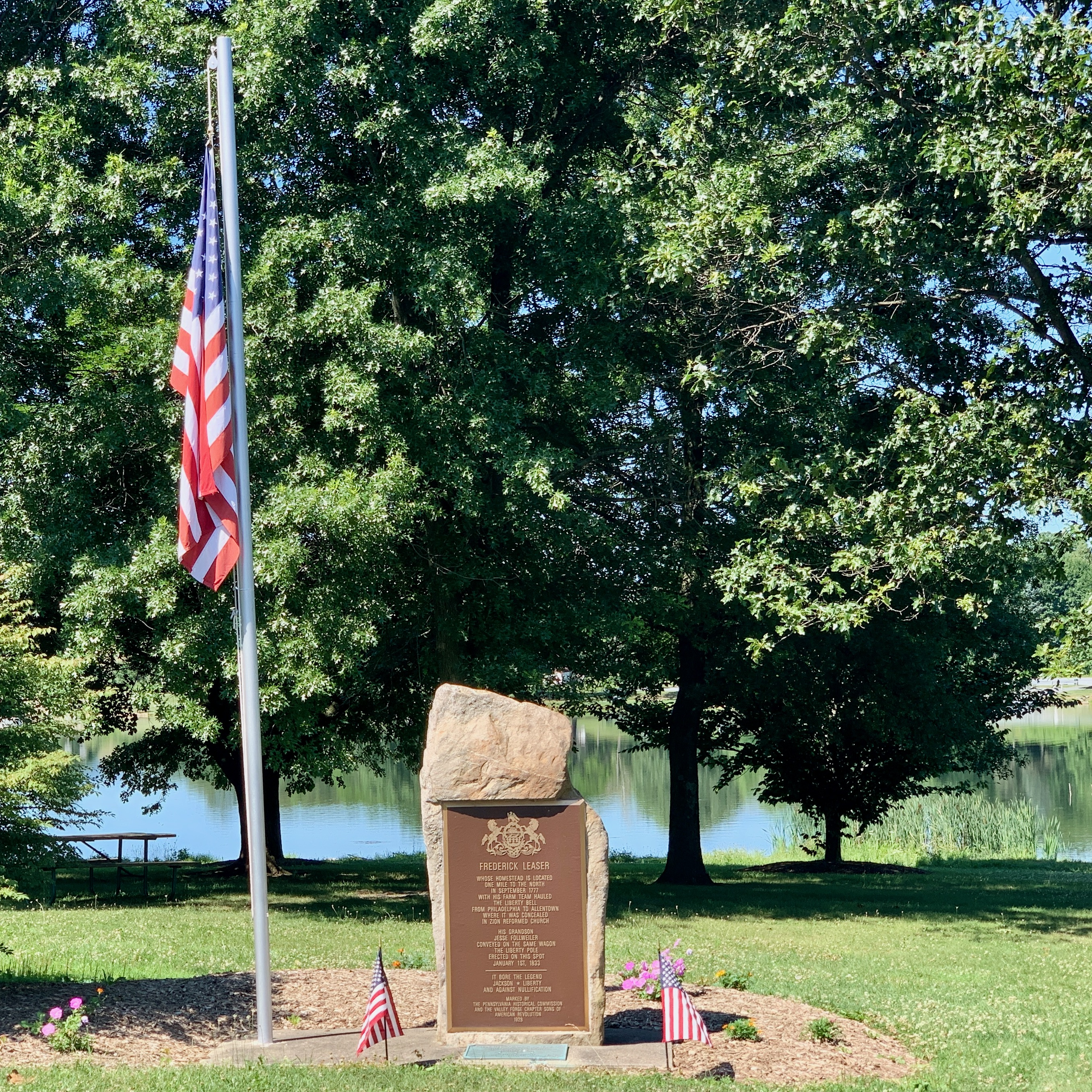
Monument to Frederick Leaser at Leaser Lake in Jacksonville

- Jacob's Church, the third building for the congregation, was built here in 1864.
- Leaser Lake, including the 1928 monument to Frederick Leaser, who transported the Liberty Bell to the Zion Reformed Church in Allentown during the American Revolutionary War.
