= Frederick Leaser =

American revolutionary soldier

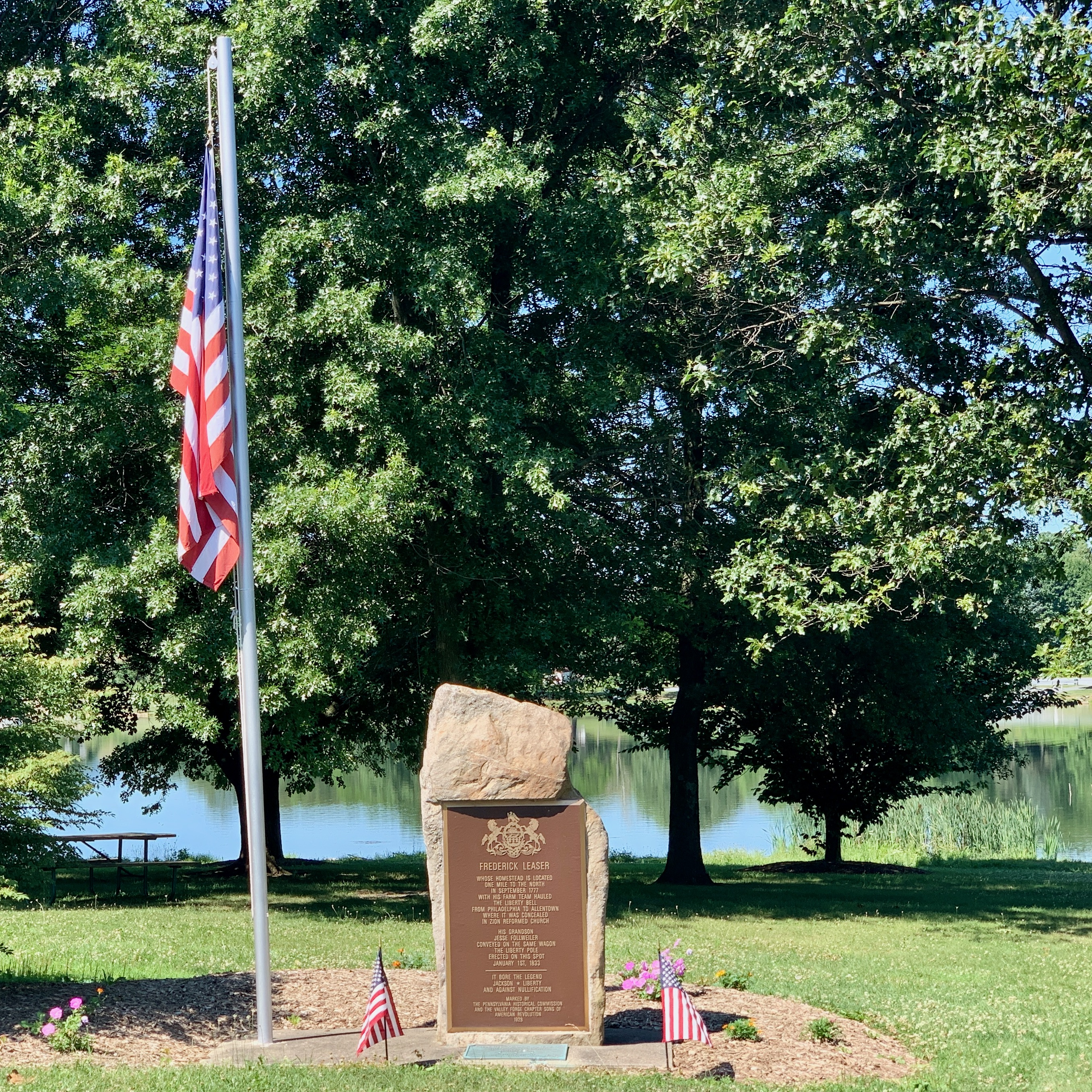
- Monument to Frederick Leaser at Leaser Lake in Lynn Township, Pennsylvania
- Born: c. 1738; Germany
- Died: 1810
- Occupations: Farmer, patriot, soldier
- Known for: Transporting the Liberty Bell to Zion Reformed Church in Allentown, Pennsylvania during the Revolutionary War

Frederick Leaser (1738–1810) was a Pennsylvanian German farmer, patriot and soldier from Lynn in Lehigh County, Pennsylvania. During the American Revolutionary War, he transported the Liberty Bell to the Zion Reformed Church in Allentown, Pennsylvania, where it was successfully hidden and protected from the British for nine months during the British occupation of Philadelphia, then the revolutionary capital of the Thirteen Colonies.

== Early life and family ==
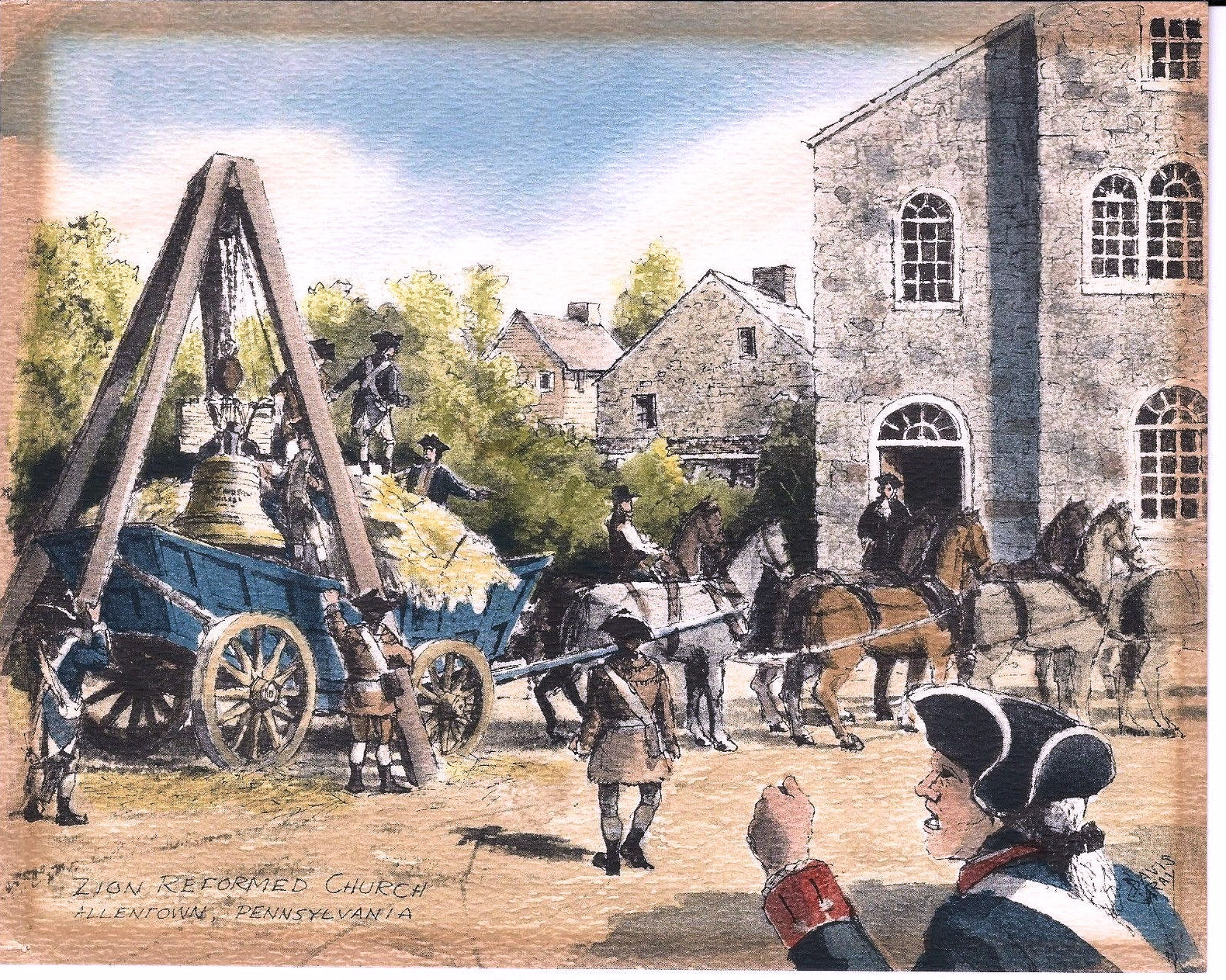
A watercolor painting depicting Leaser's transport of the Liberty Bell from Philadelphia to Zion Reformed Church in Allentown, Pennsylvania on September 24, 1777, during the Revolutionary War. The Liberty Bell was hidden under the Allentown church's floor boards for nine months, from September 1777 until June 1778, to avoid being seized by the British Army

c. 1750, Frederick Leaser, age twelve, accompanied his father, Jacob Leaser, from Switzerland to Philadelphia. At that time, his father acquired one hundred and fifteen acres in what was then Northampton County and is present-day Lynn Township in Lehigh County.

c. 1757, Leaser served in the French and Indian War (part of the Seven Years' War fought from 1754 to 1763).

== Liberty Bell transport ==
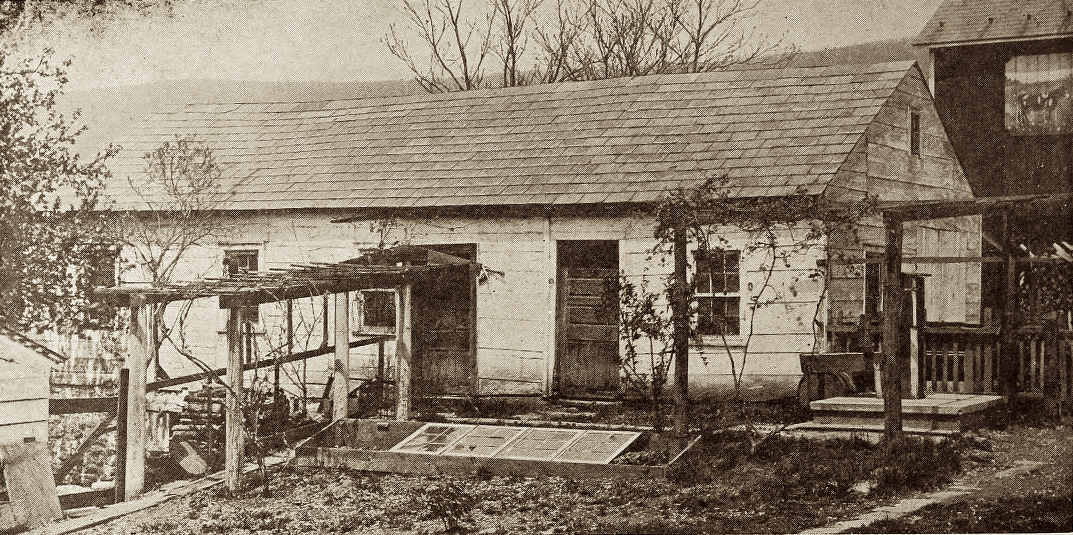
Frederick Leaser Homestead in present-day Lynn Township, Pennsylvania, c. 1914

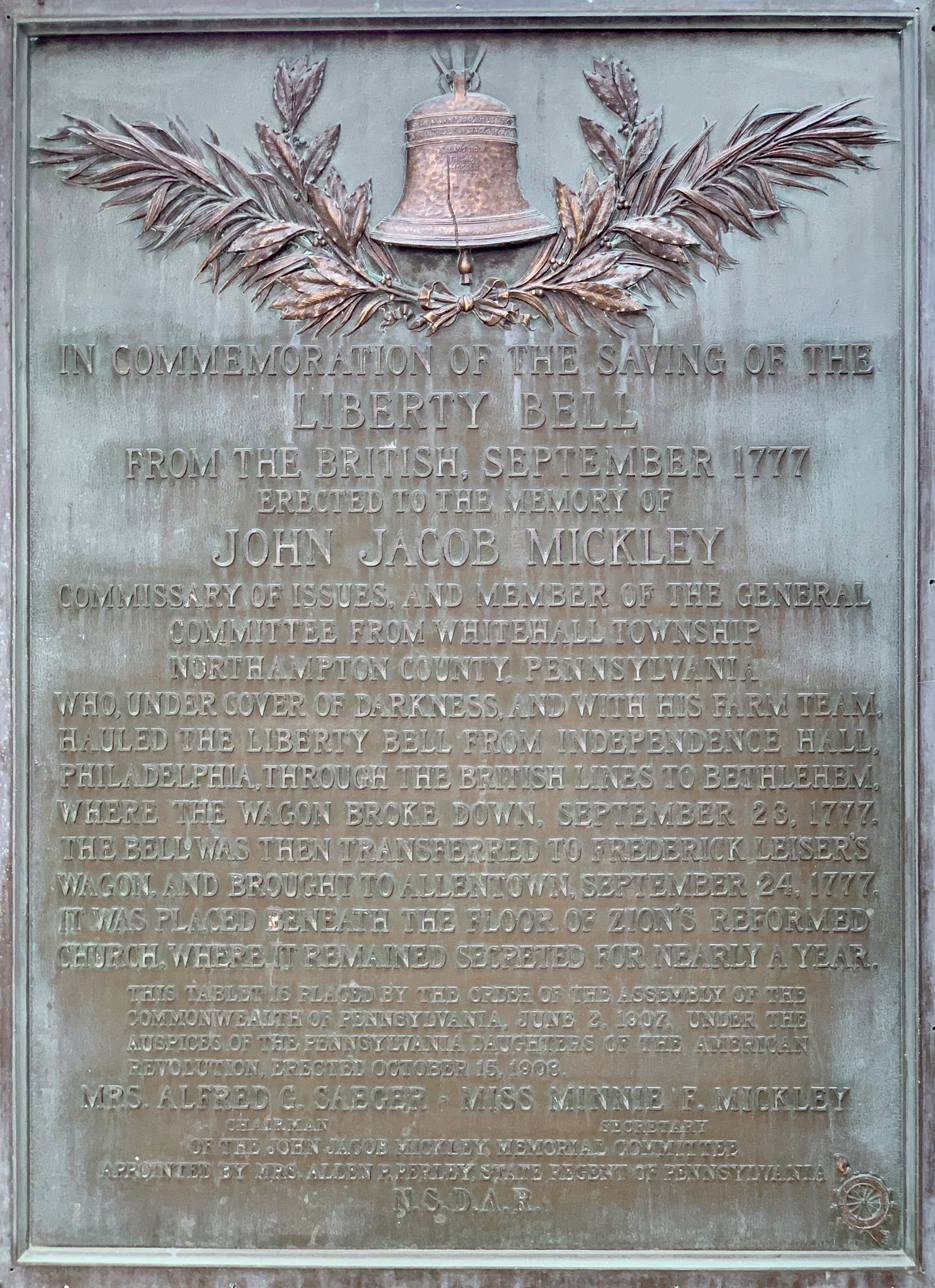
The Saving of the Liberty Bell Plaque at Zion Reformed Church

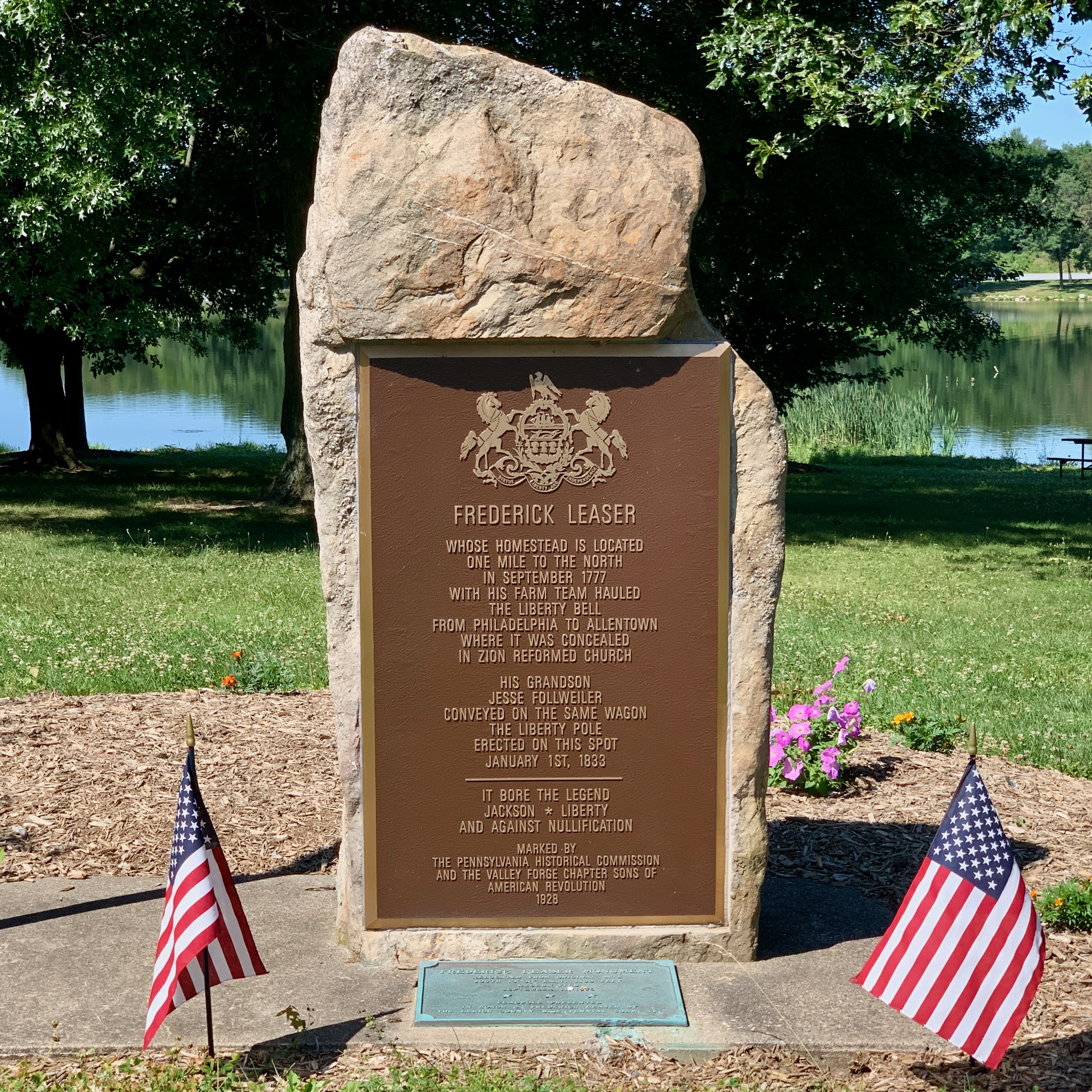
Frederick Leaser Monument at Leaser Lake

After then Continental Army commander George Washington's defeat at the Battle of Brandywine on September 11, 1777, Philadelphia, then capital for the Second Continental Congress, faced imminent attack by the British Army under General Sir William Howe. On September 14, to prevent capture of the city's tower bells, which could be melted into cannonballs, the Supreme Executive Council of the Commonwealth of Pennsylvania ordered that the bells be taken down and transported out of the city. The Liberty Bell from Independence Hall, also known as the State House Bell, was among the bells that was secured on the wagon of John Jacob Mickley and transported north.

The wagon broke down on September 23 in Bethlehem. The bell was then transferred to the wagon of Frederick Leaser, who delivered it on September 24 to the Zion Reformed Church in Allentown, where it was hidden under the church's floor boards for nine months until June 1778 when the British departed Philadelphia.

== Personal life ==
He married Catherine Smith and they had three surviving children: Daniel, Anna Maria, and Maria Dorothea. Daniel Follweiler (1769–1847) married Maria Dorothea Leaser (1769–1828) and inherited the farm after Frederick's death in 1810.

== Legacy ==
On November 19, 1908, the Liberty Bell Chapter of the Daughters of the American Revolution unveiled the Saving of the Liberty Bell Plaque, describing the efforts of Mickley and Leaser, at Zion Reformed Church in Allentown. Leaser's contribution is recognized at the Liberty Bell Museum within the church.

On November 29, 1928, the Pennsylvania Historical Commission and the Valley Forge Chapter of the Sons of the American Revolution erected a memorial monument near his home. Five direct descendants participated in the ceremony, which drew nearly a thousand people.

On January 1, 1833, Leaser's grandson, Jesse Follweiler, erected a liberty pole for President Andrew Jackson at the site, transporting the pole on the same wagon used for the Liberty Bell. The monument is now on the shore of Leaser Lake at Jacksonville.

Leaser's homestead, the Frederick and Catherine Leaser Farm, was added to the National Register of Historic Places on January 14, 2004, for its significance in agriculture and architecture.

== See also ==
- Liberty Bell Museum
- List of Pennsylvania state historical markers in Lehigh County
- Pennsylvania Dutch
