= Contrail (software) =

Cloud federation computing project

- Stable release: 1.3 / October 7, 2013
- Written in: Bash, Java, XML, Python
- Operating system: XtreemOS, Linux, Debian, Ubuntu
- Type: Cloud computing
- License: BSD, Apache License 2.0
- Website: contrail-project.eu

Contrail was a cloud federation computing project that ran from 1 October 2010 until 31 January 2014. Contrail produced open-source cloud stack software including Security, PaaS components, Distributed file system, Application Lifecycle management middleware, and SLA Management. Contrail supports OVF standard and runs on OpenStack and OpenNebula. Contrail software is a full IaaS + PaaS Cloud stack ready to implement Cloud Federations.

The most recent release is version 1.3, allowing:

- Cloud federation
- SLA Management
- Usage CONtrol
- Login over Google
- XtreemFS support
- SAML Support
- OAuth2 standard
- Virtual infrastructure Network (VIN)
- Virtual Execution Platform (VEP)
- Single Sign On (SSO)* Cloud federations*PAAS*IAAS*
- Authorization Server
- Dynamic-CA
- Hadoop

Contrail is partially funded by the FP7 Programme of the European Commission under Grant Agreement FP7-ICT-257438.

Contrail also allows virtualization, alongside Infrastructure-as-a-Service, Platform-as-a-Service. and Hybrid clouds.
