= Frederick and Catherine Leaser Farm =

- U.S. National Register of Historic Places
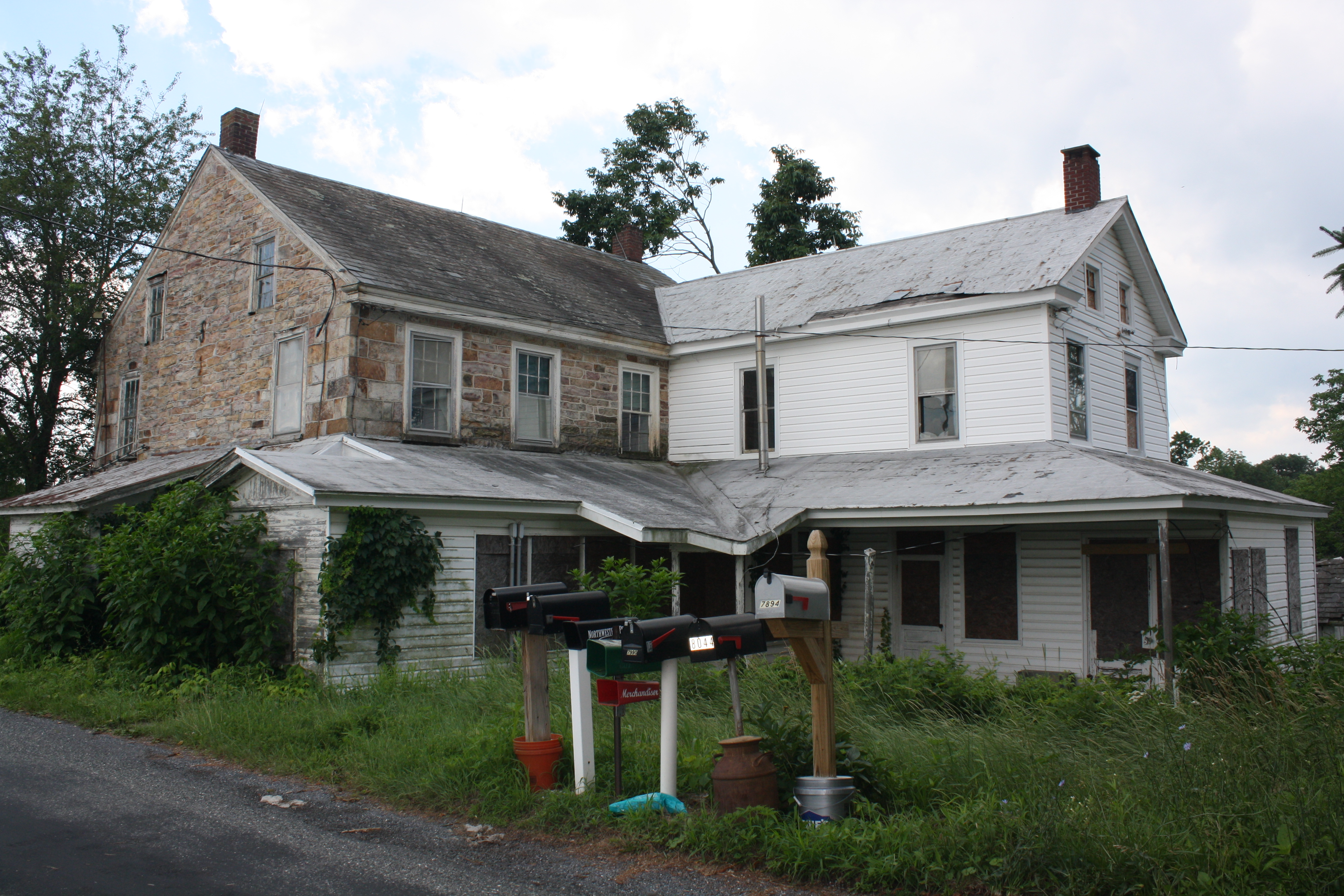
- Farmhouse at the Frederick and Catherine Leaser Farm in Lynn Township, Pennsylvania

- Location within Pennsylvania Location within the United States
- Location: 7654 Leaser Rd., Lynn Township, Pennsylvania
- Coordinates: 40°40′32″N 75°50′47″W
- Area: 76 acres (31 ha)
- NRHP reference No.: 03001420
- Added to NRHP: January 14, 2004

The Frederick and Catherine Leaser Farm, also known as the Frederick Leaser Farm, is an historic home and farm located in Lynn Township, Lehigh County, Pennsylvania. It was built by Frederick Leaser, who was one of the men involved in transporting the Liberty Bell to the Zion Reformed Church in Allentown, thereby preventing British attempts to capture the symbol of American independence during the American Revolutionary War.

The property was added to the National Register of Historic Places in 2004.

== History and features ==
Erected sometime around the mid-eighteenth century, the Frederick and Catherine Leaser Farm was held by members of the Leaser family from 1750 to 1998. Its originator, Frederick Leaser, was one of the men involved in keeping the Liberty Bell from falling into British hands during the American Revolutionary War by transporting it to the Zion Reformed Church in Allentown.

The farm property includes the original log cabin (c. 1750), Pennsylvania German vernacular farmhouse (1849), Pennsylvania bank barn (1888), outhouse (c. 1900), smokehouse (c. 1900), summer kitchen / baking house (c. 1850), wagon shed (1906), poultry shed (c. 1875), two frame storage sheds, and a corn crib (c. 1910), as well as the family burial ground and an archaeological site surveyed in 1981–1982.

== Gallery ==
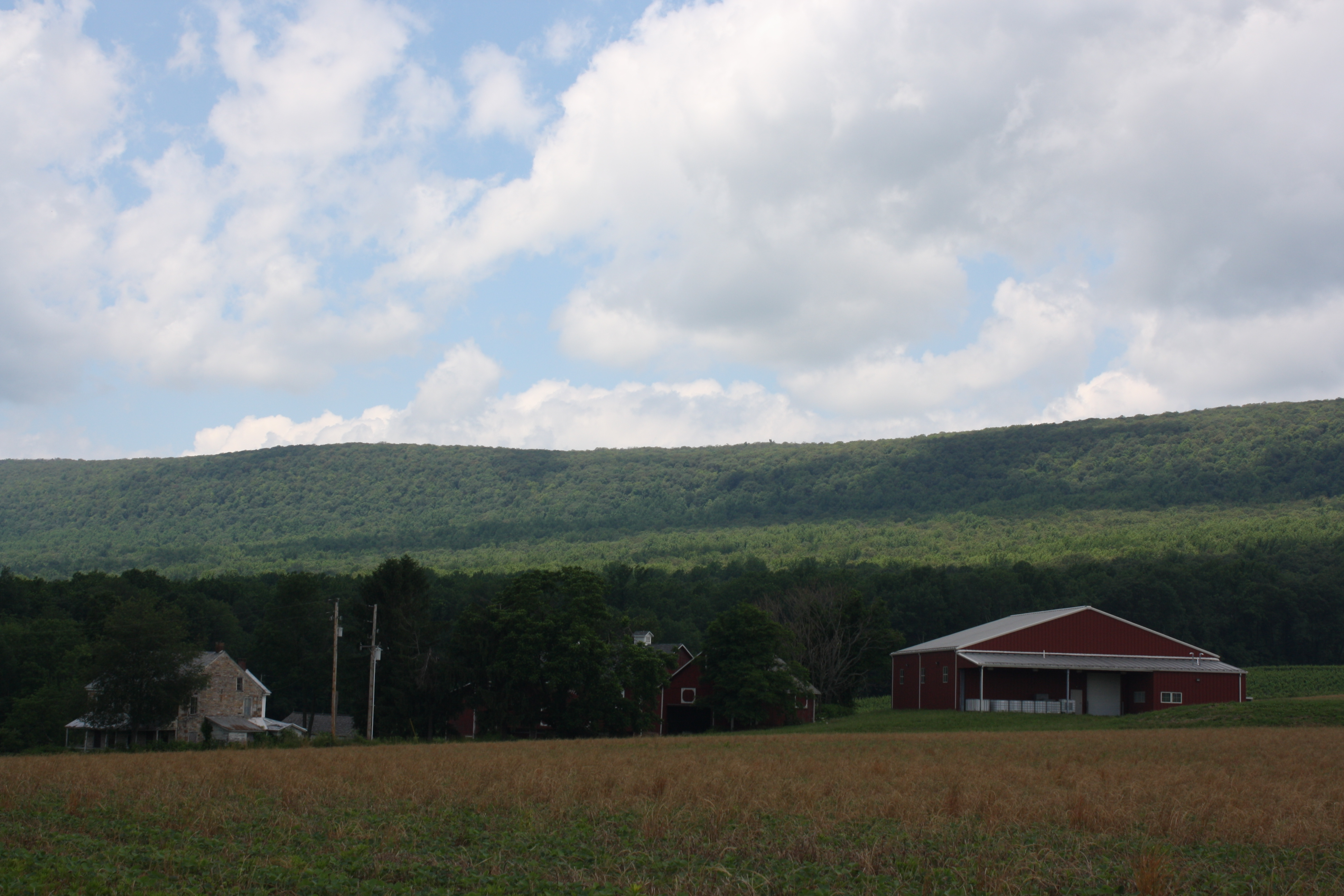
General view

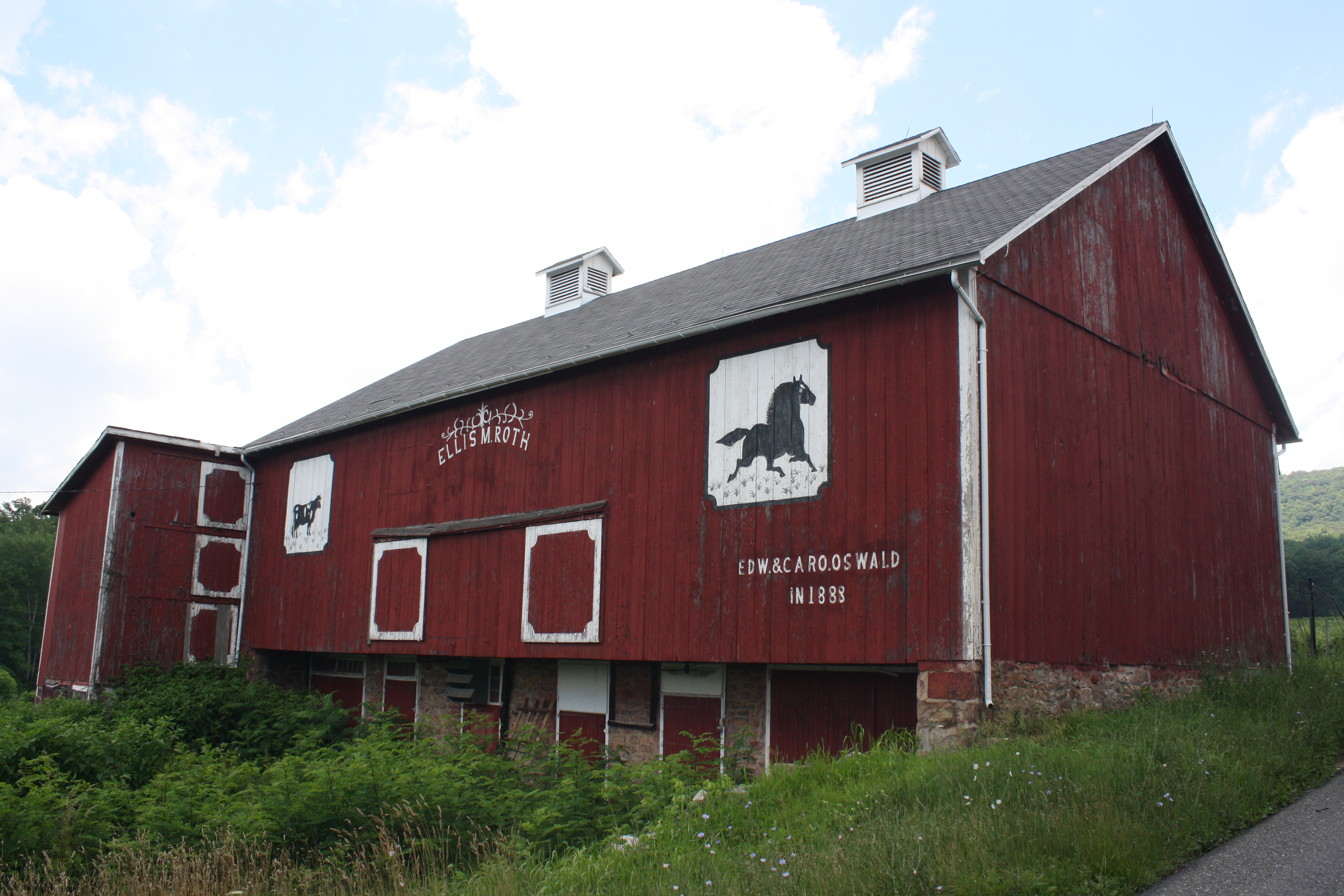
Barn

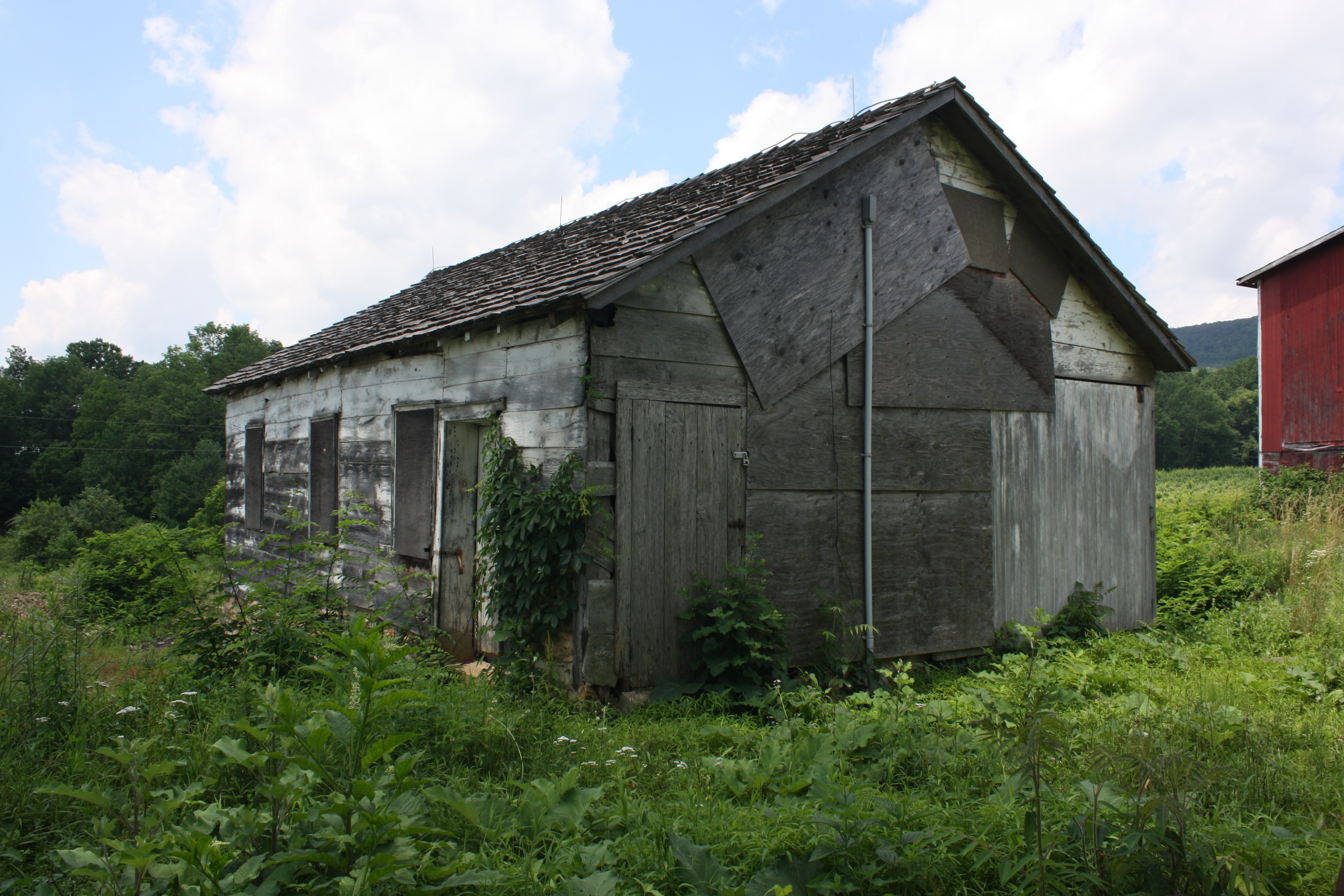
Log cabin

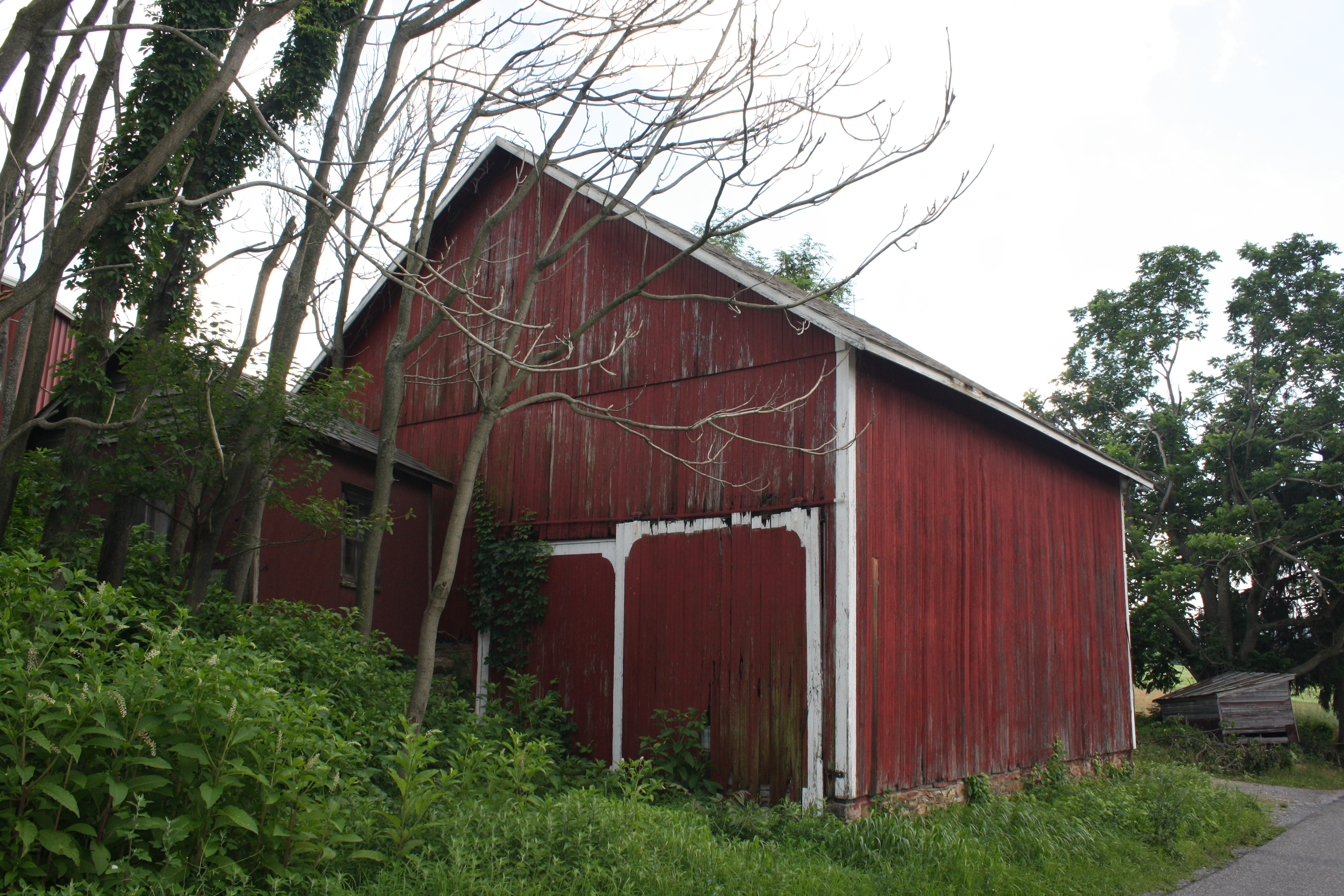
Wagon shed

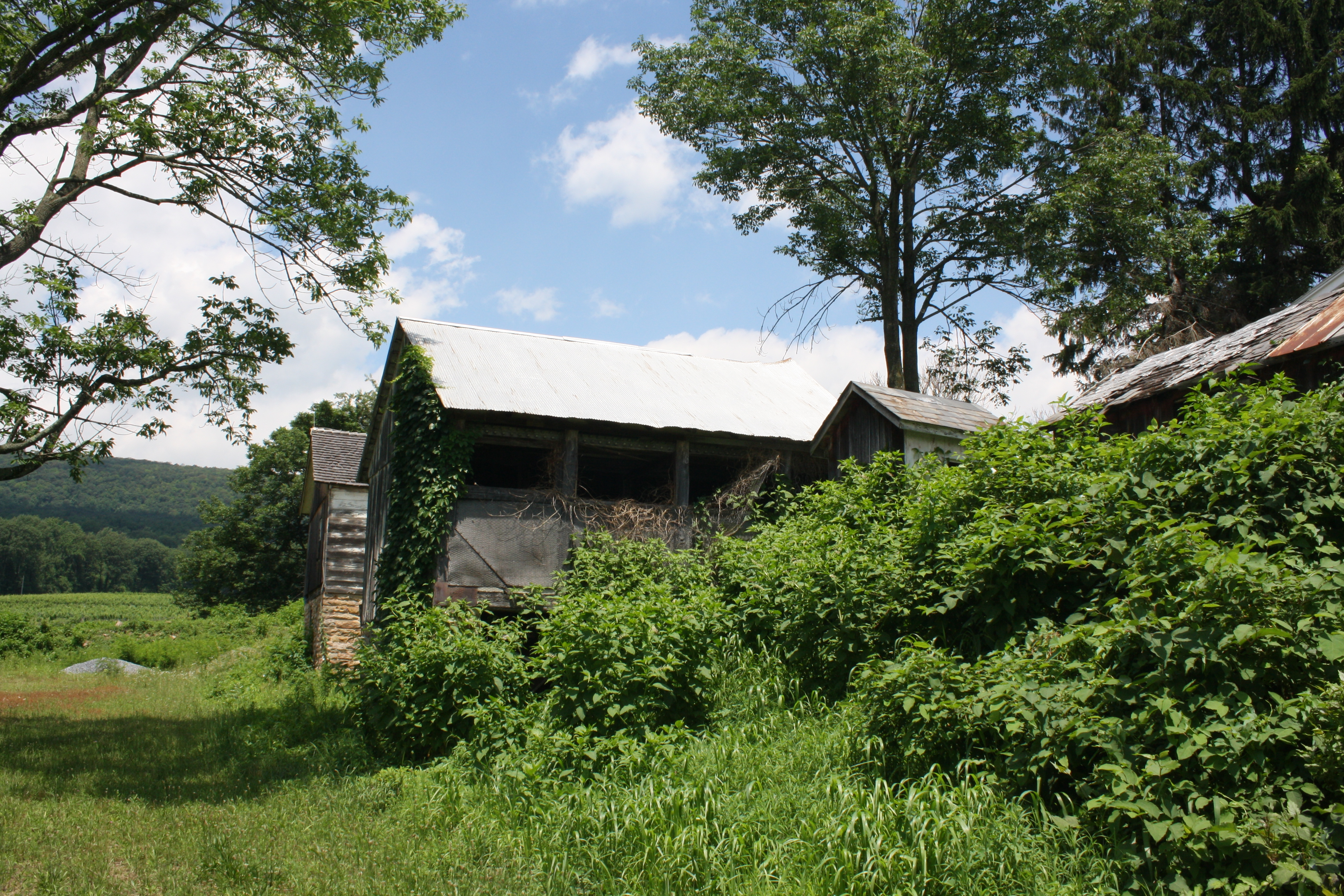
Poultry shed
