= Lynn Township, Pennsylvania =

Township in Pennsylvania, US

Lynn Township
- Township
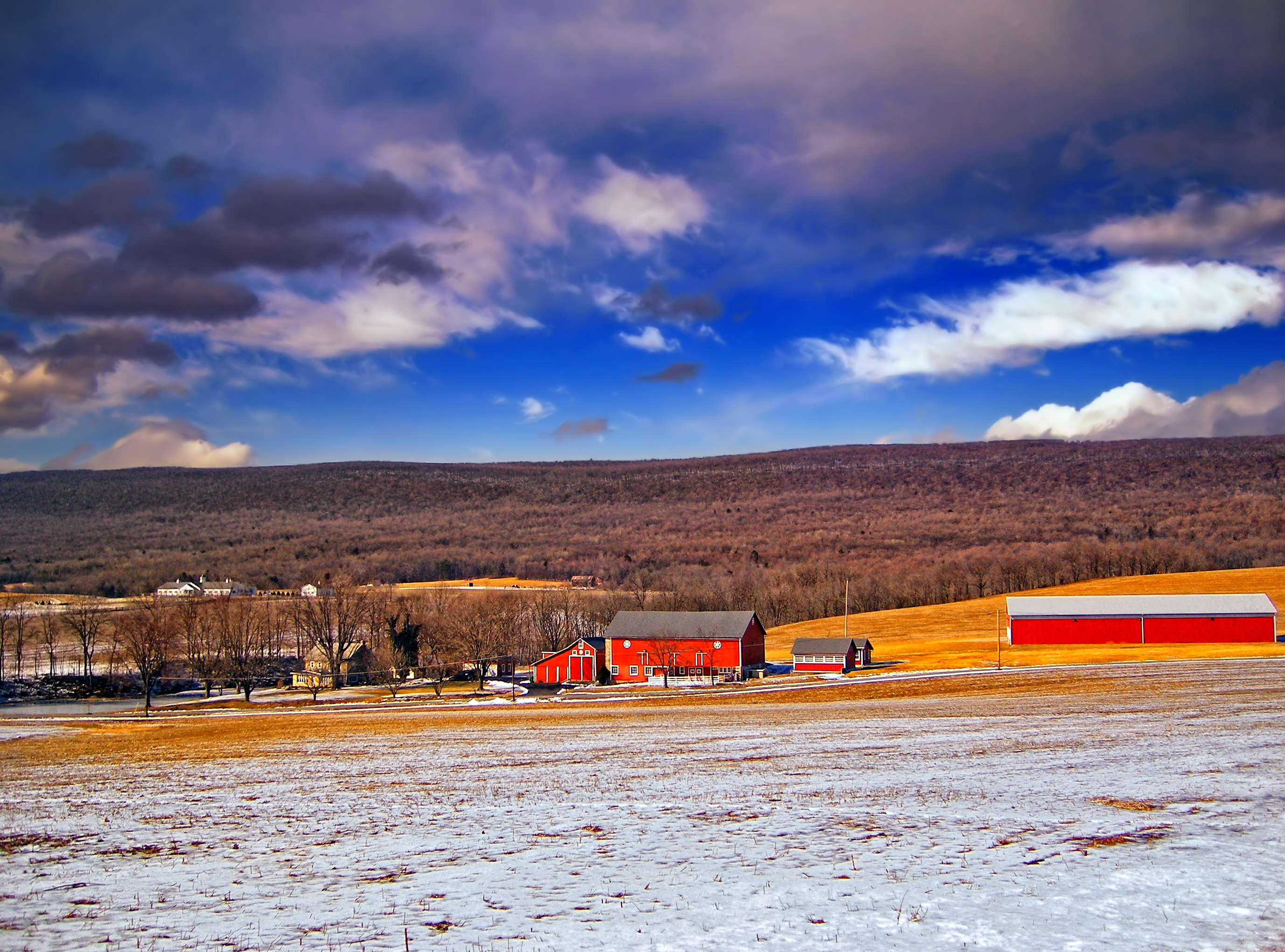
- A Lynn Township farm in February 2008

- Seal

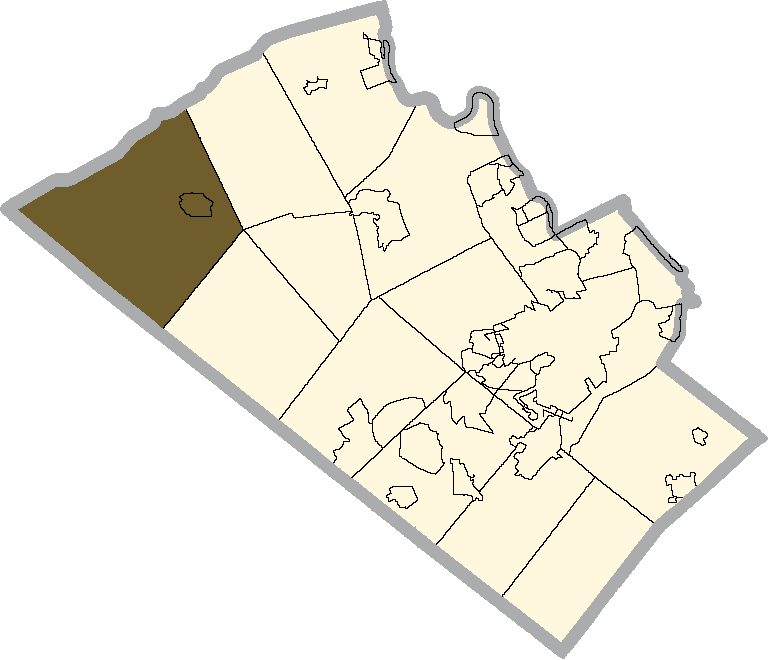
- Location of Lynn Township in Lehigh County, Pennsylvania

- Location of Lynn Township in Pennsylvania Location in the United States
- Coordinates: 40°40′06″N 75°52′35″W
- Country: United States
- State: Pennsylvania
- County: Lehigh
- Incorporated: 1753

Area
  - Township: 41.54 sq mi (107.60 km^{2})
  - Land: 41.24 sq mi (106.81 km^{2})
  - Water: 0.30 sq mi (0.78 km^{2})
- Elevation: 584 ft (178 m)

Population (2010)
  - Township: 4,229
  - Estimate (2016): 4,348
  - Density: 105.4/sq mi (40.71/km^{2})
  - Metro: 865,310 (US: 68th)
- Time zone: UTC-5 (EST)
  - Summer (DST): UTC-4 (EDT)
- Area codes: 610 and 484
- FIPS code: 42-077-45656
- GNIS feature ID: 1216692
- Primary airport: Lehigh Valley International Airport
- Major hospital: Lehigh Valley Hospital–Cedar Crest
- School district: Northwestern Lehigh
- Website: www.lynntwp.org

Lynn Township is a township in Lehigh County, Pennsylvania, United States. It is the largest township by area in Lehigh County and also the most rural and least densely populated township in the county. The population of Lynn Township was 4,229 at the 2010 census.

== Geography ==
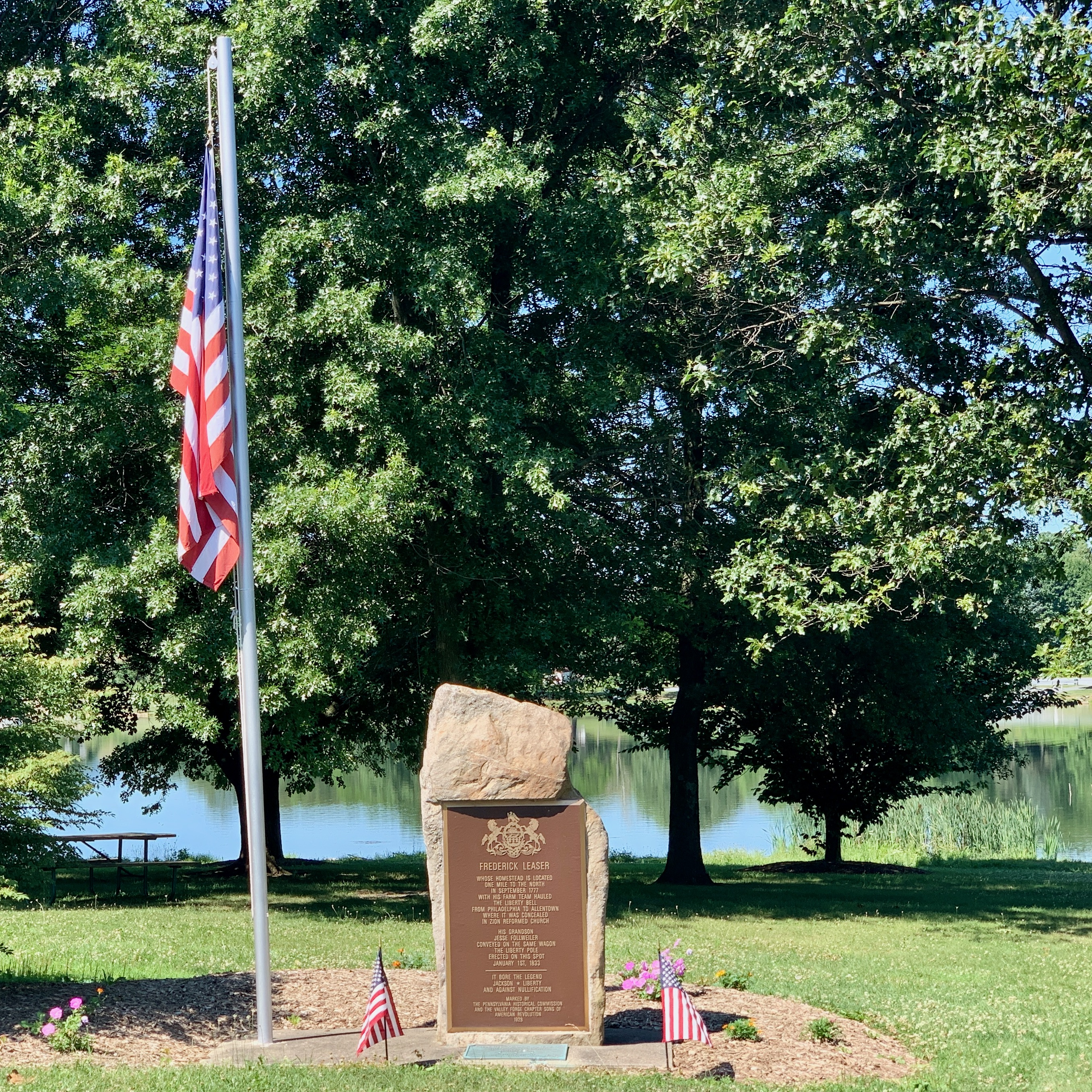
Monument honoring Frederick Leaser, a Revolutionary War Patriot at Leaser Lake in Lynn Township, 2019

The township is in the northwest corner of Lehigh County. Blue Mountain separates it from Schuylkill County in the north. According to the U.S. Census Bureau, the township has a total area of 41.5 square miles (107.6 km^{2}), of which 41.2 square miles (106.8 km^{2}) are land and 0.3 square miles (0.8 km^{2}), or 0.70%, are water. It is in the Delaware River watershed and drained by Ontelaunee Creek and Kistler Creek to the Schuylkill River via Maiden Creek, except for the area near the boundary with Weisenberg Township that is drained by Switzer Creek via Jordan Creek into the Lehigh River.

Its villages include Jacksonville, Lochland (also in Heidelberg Township), Lynnville, Lynnport, New Tripoli, Stines Corners (also in Weisenberg), and Wanamakers.

=== Adjacent municipalities ===
- Heidelberg Township (east)
- Lowhill Township (tangent to the east)
- Weisenberg Township (southeast)
- Albany Township (southwest)
- West Penn Township (north)
- East Penn Township (tangent to the northeast)

=== Climate ===
Lynn Township has a humid continental climate (Dfa/Dfb) and the hardiness zones are 6a and 6b. Average monthly temperatures in Lynnport range from 28.1 °F (−2.2 °C) in January to 72.9 °F (22.7 °C) in July.

== Demographics ==
Historical population
Census	Pop.	Note	%±
2000	3,849		—
2010	4,229		9.9%
2016 (est.)	4,348		2.8%
U.S. Decennial Census

As of the 2000 census, there were 3,849 people, 1,397 households, and 1,071 families residing in the township. The population density was 92.9 inhabitants per square mile (35.9/km^{2}). There were 1,453 housing units at an average density of 35.1 units per square mile (13.6 units/km^{2}). The racial makeup of the township was 98.08% White, 0.23% African American, 0.10% Native American, 0.23% Asian, 0.42% from other races, and 0.94% from two or more races. Hispanic or Latino of any race were 1.12% of the population.

There were 1,397 households, out of which 37.9% had children under the age of 18 living with them, 66.4% were married couples living together, 6.7% had a female householder with no husband present, and 23.3% were non-families. 18.3% of all households were made up of individuals, and 7.5% had someone living alone who was 65 years of age or older. The average household size was 2.75 and the average family size was 3.13.

In the township, the population was spread out, with 26.2% under the age of 18, 6.9% from 18 to 24, 30.6% from 25 to 44, 25.4% from 45 to 64, and 11.0% who were 65 years of age or older. The median age was 38 years. For every 100 females, there were 102.3 males. For every 100 females age 18 and over, there were 101.6 males. The median income for a household in the township was $53,883, and the median income for a family was $61,520. Males had a median income of $38,510 versus $29,866 for females. The per capita income for the township was $22,688. About 2.1% of families and 4.1% of the population were below the poverty line, including 8.3% of those under age 18 and none age 65 or over.

== History ==
Lynn Township was established in 1732, a part of what was known as the Allemängel or Allemaengel. Its settlers early were predominantly German and Swiss. The Kistler Valley area of Lynn Township is named after Johaness Jeorg Kistler, who came to the U.S. in 1737 from the Palatinate region of Germany.

In 2004, in recognition of its historical significance, the Frederick and Catherine Leaser Farm was added to the National Register of Historic Places.

== Education ==
The township is served by the Northwestern Lehigh School District.

== Government ==
- U.S. Representative Ryan Mackenzie (Republican), PA-7)

United States presidential election results for Lynn Township, Pennsylvania
Year	Republican		Democratic		Third party(ies)	
Year	No.	%	No.	%	No.	%
2024	1,888	69.03%	815	29.80%	32	1.17%
2020	1,759	65.90%	862	32.30%	48	1.80%
2016	1,517	66.33%	682	29.82%	88	3.85%
2012	1,343	63.26%	739	34.81%	41	1.93%
2008	1,170	56.66%	867	41.99%	28	1.36%
2004	1,290	62.96%	742	36.21%	17	0.83%

== Transportation ==
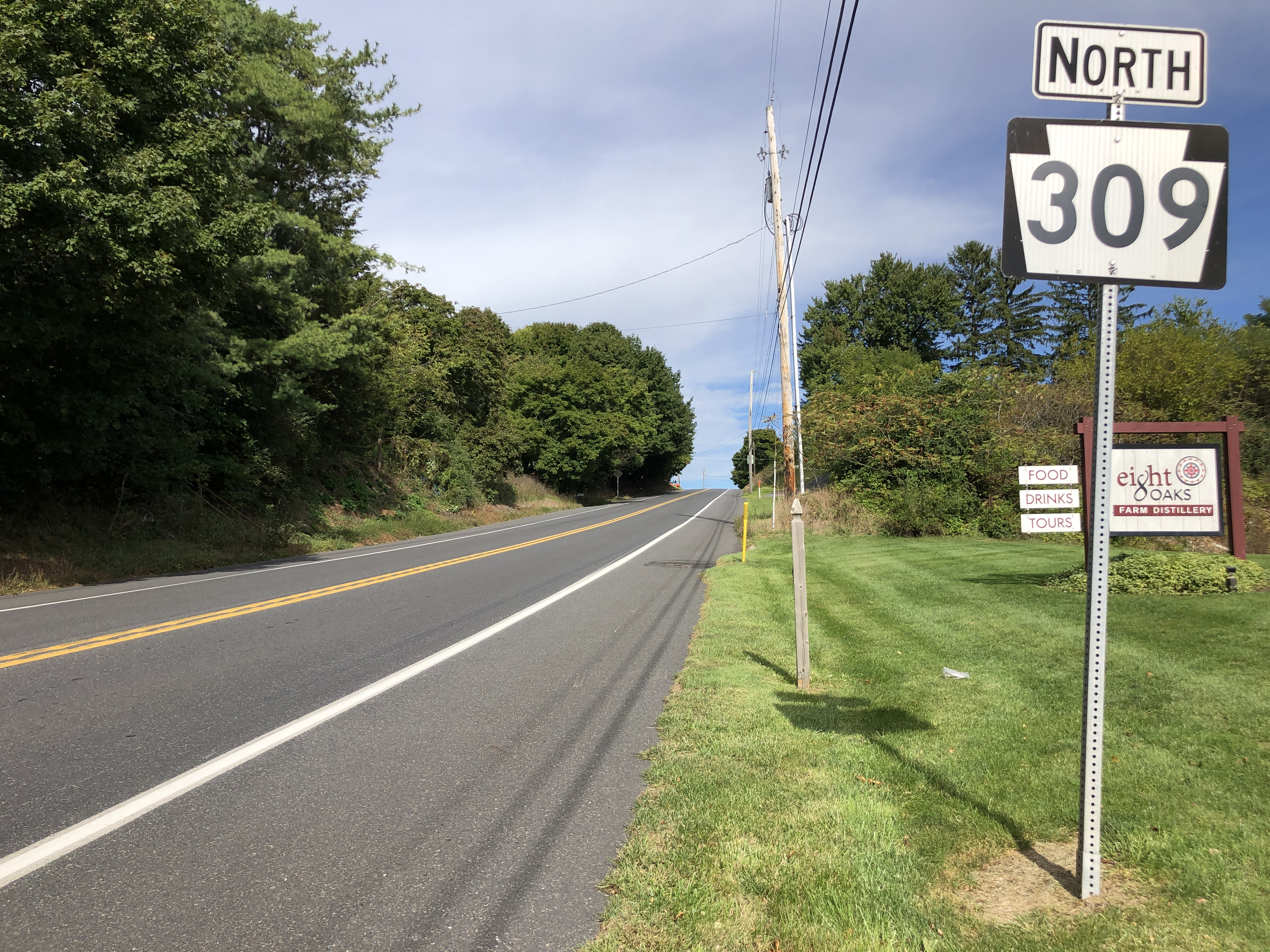
PA Route 309 North in Lynn Township

As of 2015, there were 117.10 miles (188.45 km) of public roads in Lynn Township, of which 50.22 miles (80.82 km) were maintained by the Pennsylvania Department of Transportation (PennDOT) and 66.88 miles (107.63 km) were maintained by the township.

Numbered routes in Lynn Township include Pennsylvania Route 143, Pennsylvania Route 309, and Pennsylvania Route 863. Other local roads of note include Kistler Valley Road/Holbens Valley Road, Mountain Road/Mosserville Road, Owl Valley Road, Schochary Road, and Sechler Road.

== Community ==
Lynn Township is served by two volunteer fire companies: the Community Fire Company of New Tripoli and the Lynnport Fire Company. Emergency medical services are provided by Cetronia Ambulance Corps in Cetronia. Law enforcement is provided by the Pennsylvania State Police from their Fogelsville barracks. The local newspaper is The Northwestern Press. New Tripoli in Lynn Township houses a bank and post office.

The Appalachian National Scenic Trail passes along the northern portion of the township, and a very small portion of the Pennsylvania State Game Lands Number 106 is located in the northwestern corner of the township.

In addition to a number of one-room schoolhouses and traditional Pennsylvania Dutch farms, local attractions include:

- Carriage Museum, New Tripoli
- Leaser Lake
- Ontelaunee Park, New Tripoli

== Notable people ==
- Edward Hermany, Pennsylvania German poet
- Augustus Frederick Sherman, former Ellis Island official
