= John Letts =

John Letts may refer to:

- John Letts (publisher) (1929–2006), English publisher, who founded the British Empire and Commonwealth Museum
- John Letts (mid-1700s), English stationary producer, who founded Letts of London
- John Spencer Letts (1934–2014), U.S. federal judge
- John Letts (jockey) (born 1943), former Australian jockey
- John Letts (tennis) (born 1964), former professional tennis player from the United States
- John Letts (RAF officer) (1897–1918), World War I flying ace in No. 48 Squadron RAF
