= Let, West Virginia =

- Unincorporated community
- Location within West Virginia Location within the United States
- Coordinates: 38°53′32″N 80°49′39″W
- Country: United States
- State: West Virginia
- County: Gilmer
- Elevation: 814 ft (248 m)
- Time zone: UTC-5 (Eastern (EST))
  - Summer (DST): UTC-4 (EDT)
- GNIS feature ID: 1689691

Let was an unincorporated community in Gilmer County, West Virginia, United States. Its post office is closed.
