= IET =

IET can refer to:

== Organizations ==
- Institute of Educational Technology, part of the Open University
- Institution of Engineering and Technology, a UK-based professional engineering institution
  - Institute of Engineers and Technicians, which became part of the Institution of Incorporated Engineers in 1998 (which then became part of the Institution of Engineering and Technology in 2006)
- Institute of Engineering and Technology of Lucknow, India
- University Institute of Engineering and Technology, Kanpur University of Kanpur, India, formerly known as IET Kanpur
- Institute of Engineering Technology, Sri Lanka, a Government higher education institute that providing NDES (National Diploma in Engineering Sciences) Award in Sri Lanka
- Islamic Educational Trust, Islamic organization in Nigeria
- Institute of Engineering and Technology, Ayodhya of Faizabad, Uttar Pradesh, India

== Persons ==
- iET (musician), a singer-songwriter from the Netherlands

== Processes ==
- Impulse excitation technique
- Initial Entry Training, the technical term for United States Army Basic Training
- Interval exchange transformation
- Interest Equalization Tax, an American tax initiative

== Other ==
- British Rail Class 800, a fleet of British high-speed trains, known as Intercity Express Trains by their operator Great Western Railway
- British Rail Class 802, another fleet of British high-speed trains, known as Intercity Express Trains by their operator Great Western Railway
- Indole-3-ethanol or tryptophol, a chemical compound
