= Leaser Lake =

Man-made lake in Pennsylvania

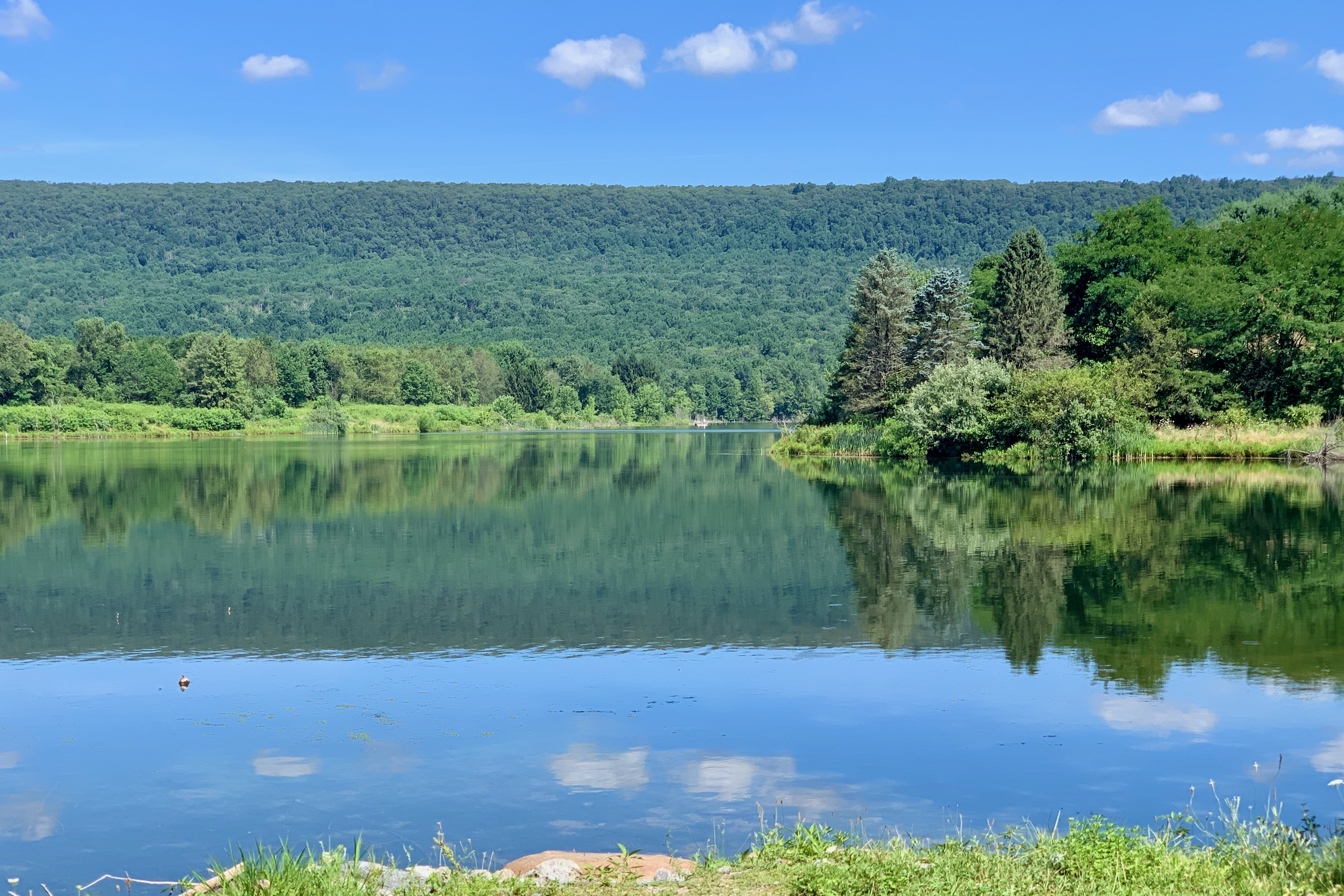
- Leaser Lake in Lehigh County, Pennsylvania

- Location of Leaser Lake in Pennsylvania
- Location: 8502 Pleasure Court; New Tripoli, Pennsylvania 18066; Lehigh County, Pennsylvania
- Coordinates: 40°40′07″N 75°50′05″W
- Type: Artificial lake
- Primary inflows: Jacksonville Branch of the Ontelaunee Creek
- Primary outflows: Sinking Creek
- Basin countries: United States
- Surface area: 117 acres (47 ha)
- Max. depth: 45 ft (14 m)
- References: GeoNames

Leaser Lake is a man-made lake located near the village of Jacksonville in Lynn Township, Lehigh County, Pennsylvania. The lake is owned by the Commonwealth of Pennsylvania and managed by the Pennsylvania Fish and Boat Commission (PFBC).

The lake was built for recreational use and opened to the public in 1971. It is the only lake in Lehigh County. The lake is part of a 540-acre park which is owned in part by the PFBC and in part by Lehigh County.

The lake covers 117 acres and is 45 feet deep. The lake is created by a dam located on the Jacksonville Branch of the Ontelaunee Creek which is a tributary of Maiden Creek. The dam consists of an earth embankment, approximately 430 feet long by 53 feet high, and the top of the dam is 24 feet wide.

== History ==
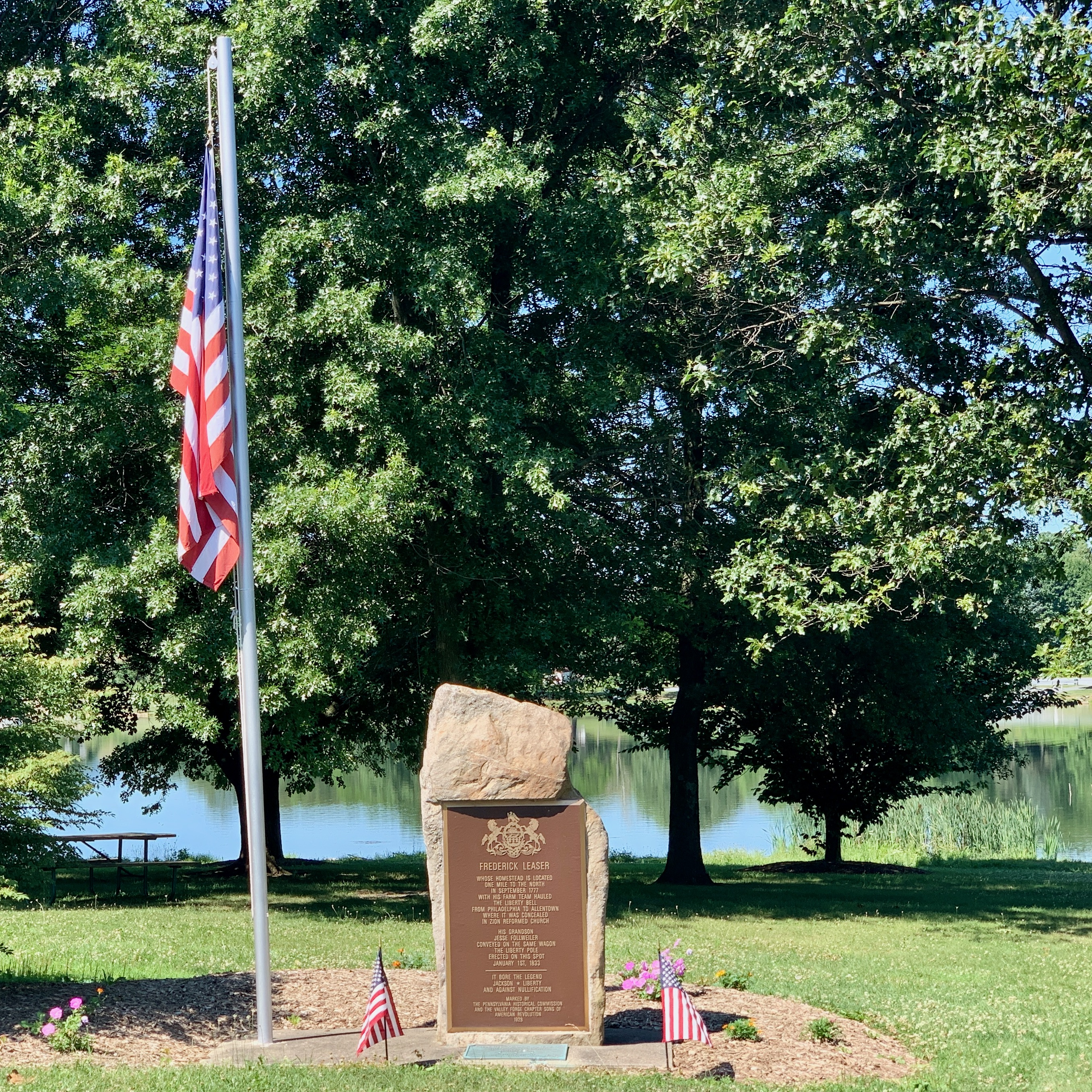
Monument at Leaser Lake to Frederick Leaser, who transported the Liberty Bell from Philadelphia to present-day Allentown, where it was successfully hidden from the British Army for nine months

The lake is named after American patriot Frederick Leaser, who during the Revolutionary War in September 1777, transported the Liberty Bell from Philadelphia, then the revolutionary capital of the Thirteen Colonies to Allentown to protect it from the British as they were preparing to seize to Philadelphia. While in route, the wagon carrying the bell broke down and the bell was then transferred to Leaser's wagon to complete the journey to Zion Reformed Church in Allentown. Leaser's home was in what is now known as Lynn Township.

Leaser Lake dam has had a seepage problem since it was first filled. In 1991, the Pennsylvania Fish and Boat Commission drained the lake to make needed repairs on the dam. The 1991 repairs proved to be inadequate and in 1999 the lake had to be drained 20 feet to prevent dam failure. In 2008-2009, the lake was once again drained to rebuild the dam and spillway.

Shortly after the lake was reopened, seepage was once again discovered which prevented the lake from being completely filled. The new seepage location was not where the dam's last $3.5 million rebuilding project had taken place. In September 2014, the lake was lowered by 20 feet so that repairs could be made to the recent seeping area. Repairs to the dam were completed in Spring 2015 and the lake was filled to capacity for the first time since 1991.

== Primary fish ==
- Bluegill
- Brown Bullhead
- Chain Pickerel
- Large Mouth Bass
- Muskellunge
- Rainbow Trout
- Yellow Perch
