= Peter James Thomas =

British academic and entrepreneur

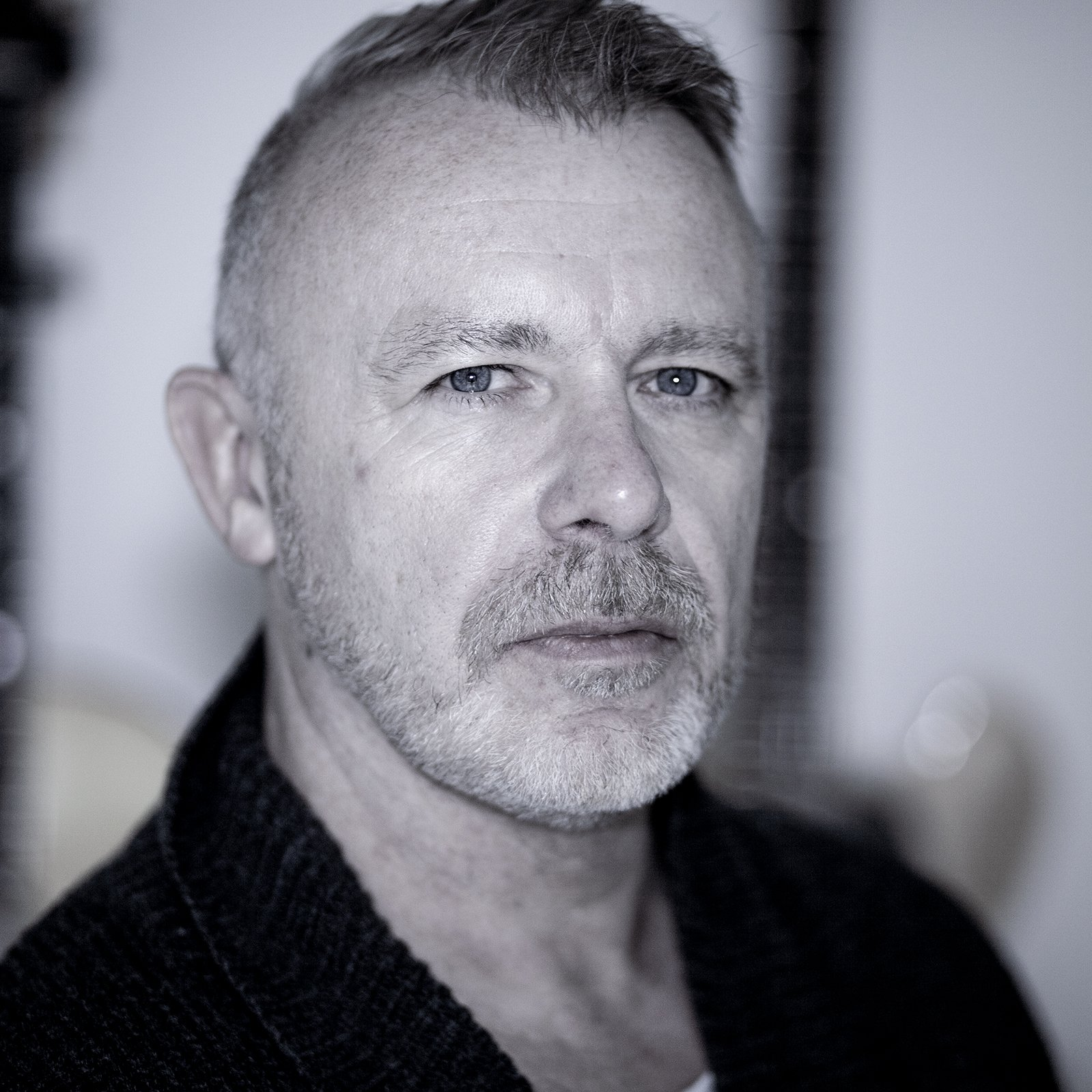
- Born: Bingley, West Yorkshire, United Kingdom
- Citizenship: British, Australian
- Education: University of Hull, York St John University, University of Cambridge
- Known for: Human-Computer Interaction, Personal Information Management, Ubiquitous Computing, social media, service design, experience design, design thinking, future of work.
- Scientific career
- Fields: Human-Computer Interaction, Personal information management, Ubiquitous Computing, Mobile computing
- Workplaces: Brunel University, University of Melbourne, Beijing Normal University, Falmouth University, Newcastle University, Haileybury school, RMIT University.
- Doctoral advisor: Professor Michael Norman
- Notable students: Professor Robert Macredie

Notes
- Former Fellow of the Institution of Engineering and Technology (FIET), Fellow of the British Computer Society (FBCS), Chartered Information Technology Professional (CITP)

Peter James Thomas is a British academic and entrepreneur known for his contributions to human–computer interaction (HCI), personal information management (PIM), and ubiquitous computing. His work has been widely cited in HCI publications.

== Biography ==
Thomas was educated at Mexborough Grammar School, York St John University, the University of Cambridge, and the University of Hull. He completed a PhD at Hull on the applications of social science to computing.

He lectured in Human–computer interaction at Brunel University between 1990 and 1992 and was appointed Professor of Information Management at the University of the West of England in 1993.

Thomas later became the inaugural director of the Centre for Future Skills and Workforce Transformation at RMIT University in Melbourne. He was the founding Editor-in-Chief of the Springer Nature journal Personal and Ubiquitous Computing and founding director of the online learning platform HaileyburyX.

He is head of higher education for the Conversation Design Institute; co-founder of the School for Conversation Design; creative director of Medicine Unboxed; founder and CEO of the cybersecurity education platform Upling; and president of the CDI Foundation.

== Selected Publications ==
- Thomas, Peter J., ed. (1995). Social and Interactional Dimensions of Human–Computer Interaction. Cambridge University Press. ISBN 052145302X.
- Etzel, Barbara; Thomas, Peter J. (1999). Personal Information Management: Tools and Techniques for Achieving Professional Effectiveness. NYU Press. ISBN 978-0-8147-2200-8.
- Thomas, Peter; Macredie, Robert D. (2002). "The New Usability". ACM Transactions on Computer-Human Interaction. 9 (2): 69–73. doi:10.1145/513665.513666.
