= Suzuki Let's =

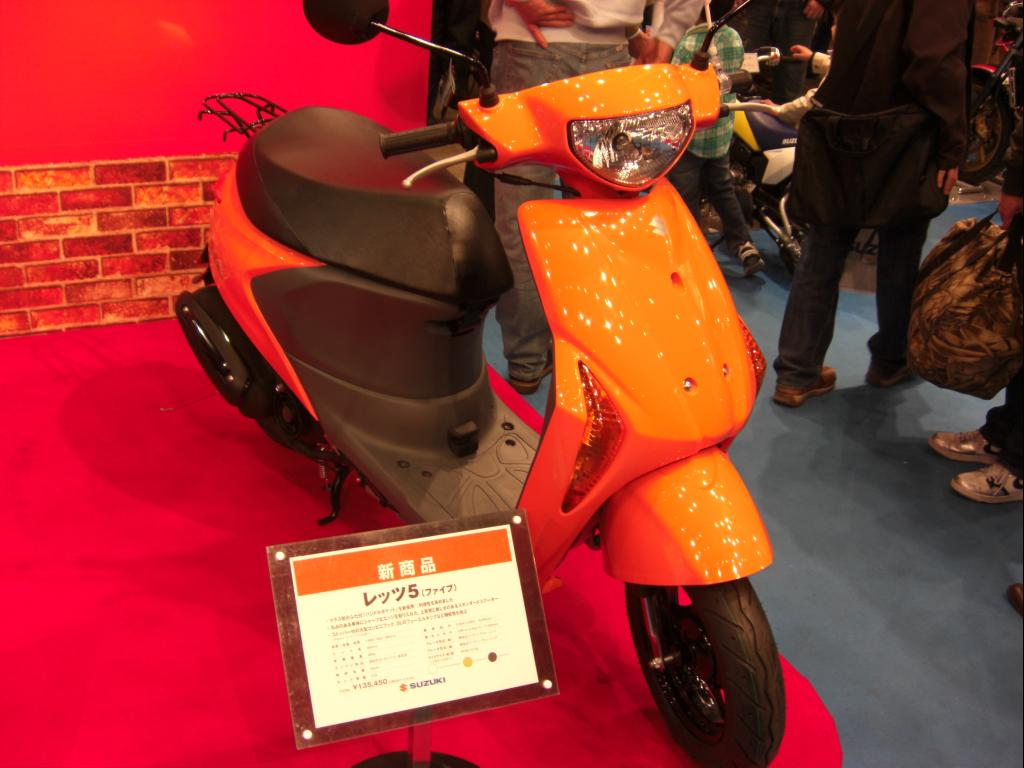
- Manufacturer: Suzuki Motorcycle India Limited
- Also called: Suzuki Lets
- Parent company: Suzuki Motor Corporation
- Class: Scooter
- Engine: 112.8 cc (6.88 cu in), SOHC, four-stroke, single
- Power: 8.7 HP @ 7500 RPM
- Torque: 9 Nm @ 6500 RPM
- Transmission: Continuously variable automatic transmission
- Frame type: Underbone type
- Suspension: Front: telescopic, coil spring, oil-damped Rear: swingarm type, coil spring, oil-damped
- Brakes: Drum: front and rear (120 mm diameter)
- Tires: 90/100/10 (Front), 90/100/10 (Rear)
- Wheelbase: 1,250 mm (49 in)
- Dimensions: L: 1,805 mm (71.1 in); W: 655 mm (25.8 in); H: 1,120 mm (44 in)
- Seat height: 765 mm (30.1 in)
- Fuel capacity: 5.2 L (1.1 imp gal; 1.4 US gal)
- Oil capacity: 0.75 L (0.16 imp gal; 0.20 US gal)

The Suzuki Let's is a scooter manufactured by Suzuki Motorcycle India Limited, a subsidiary of Japanese motorcycle company Suzuki. The scooter was showcased by the company at the 2014 Auto Expo.

== Technology ==
=== SEP ===
The Suzuki Let's is powered by a brand new engine made by Suzuki which uses SEP (Suzuki Eco Performance). The technology involves use of lighter rocker arms and alterations to the valve angle, in an effort to increase the combustion efficiency of the engine.
