= Rental (disambiguation) =

Rental refers to the act of renting.

Rental or Rentals may also refer to:

- Robert Rental (1952–2000), British musician
- The Rental, 2020 American film
- The Rentals, American rock band
- "Rental" (song), by Brockhampton
