= Judge Letts =

Judge Letts may refer to:

- F. Dickinson Letts (1875–1965), judge of the United States District Court for the District of Columbia
- Ira Lloyd Letts (1889–1947), judge of the United States District Court for the District of Rhode Island
- John Spencer Letts (1934–2014), judge of the United States District Court for the Central District of California
