= National Register of Historic Places listings in Berks County, Pennsylvania =

Location of Berks County in Pennsylvania

This is a list of the National Register of Historic Places listings in Berks County, Pennsylvania.

This is intended to be a complete list of the properties and districts on National Register of Historic Places in Berks County, Pennsylvania, United States. The locations of National Register properties and districts for which the latitude and longitude coordinates are included below, may be seen in a map.

There are 144 properties and districts listed on the National Register in the county. Two sites are further designated a National Historic Landmark and another is a National Historic Site.

This National Park Service list is complete through NPS recent listings posted June 6, 2026.

== Current listings ==
	Name on the Register	Image	Date listed	Location	City or town	Description
1	Albright Court Apartments		February 20, 2026 (#100012728)	1430 North 13th Street; 40°21′26″N 75°54′44″W	Reading	
2	Allegheny Aqueduct	Allegheny Aqueduct	February 23, 1984 (#84003105)	Pennsylvania Route 724 and Allegheny Creek at Gibraltar; 40°17′10″N 75°53′13″W	Robeson Township	
3	Alleghany Mennonite Meetinghouse	Alleghany Mennonite Meetinghouse	June 6, 2009 (#09000384)	39 Horning Road; 40°14′07″N 75°58′17″W	Brecknock Township	
4	Askew Bridge	Askew Bridge	March 1, 1973 (#73001590)	North 6th Street near Woodward Street; 40°20′37″N 75°55′34″W	Reading	
5	Bahr Mill Complex	Bahr Mill Complex	November 8, 1990 (#90001611)	Ironstone Drive; 40°20′19″N 75°39′31″W	Colebrookdale Township	
6	Barto Bridge	Barto Bridge	June 22, 1988 (#88000790)	Legislative Route 284 over a tributary of Perkiomen Creek near Bally; 40°23′46″N 75°36′31″W	Washington Township	
7	Belleman's Union Church	Belleman's Union Church	December 4, 1973 (#73001589)	Southwest of Centerport off Bellemans Church Road; 40°27′31″N 76°01′52″W	Centre Township	Old church built 1814 still standing supported 2 congregations. New church built 1924.
8	Daniel Berk Log House	Daniel Berk Log House	December 16, 1977 (#77001122)	South of Albany on Maiden Creek; 40°36′16″N 75°52′19″W	Albany Township	
9	Berkley Historic District	Berkley Historic District	August 22, 2002 (#02000892)	Section of Snyder Road between Pennsylvania Route 61 and Berkley Road; 40°25′39″N 75°56′16″W	Ontelaunee Township	
10	Berks County Trust Company	Berks County Trust Company	February 27, 2019 (#100003455)	35 N. 6th St. 40°20′11″N 75°55′33″W	Reading	
11	Bethel A.M.E. Church	Bethel A.M.E. Church	September 7, 1979 (#79002167)	119 North 10th Street; 40°20′15″N 75°55′05″W	Reading	
12	John Bishop House	John Bishop House	June 27, 1985 (#85001390)	Perkiomen Avenue east of Reading; 40°18′02″N 75°50′56″W	Exeter Township	
13	Bobb Mill and Farmstead		February 2, 2026 (#100012678)	849 Forgedale Road; 40°23′49″N 75°36′42″W	Barto	
14	Daniel Boone Homestead Site and Bertolet Cabin	Daniel Boone Homestead Site and Bertolet Cabin	March 24, 1972 (#72001090)	2 miles (3.2 km) north of Birdsboro; 40°17′37″N 75°48′13″W	Exeter Township	
15	Boonecroft	Boonecroft	July 26, 1982 (#82003758)	Oley Line Road near Limekiln; 40°19′56″N 75°48′10″W	Exeter Township	
16	Borneman Mill	Borneman Mill	November 8, 1990 (#90001612)	Off Pennsylvania Route 100 southwest of Clayton; 40°24′57″N 75°34′39″W	Washington Township	
17	Boyer-Mertz Farm	Boyer-Mertz Farm	September 9, 1992 (#92000937)	Junction of Noble Street and Bastian Road; 40°29′50″N 75°45′59″W	Maxatawny Township	
18	Bridge in Albany Township	Bridge in Albany Township	June 22, 1988 (#88000769)	Legislative Route 06173 over Maiden Creek; 40°38′07″N 75°51′21″W	Albany Township	
19	Brobst Mill	Brobst Mill	November 8, 1990 (#90001613)	Off Township 814 on Pine Creek; 40°37′23″N 75°53′50″W	Albany Township	
20	Philip Christman House	Philip Christman House	March 7, 1973 (#73001588)	1 mile (1.6 km) southeast of Bally at the Berks; 40°24′00″N 75°34′13″W	Washington Township	
21	City Hall	City Hall	April 13, 1982 (#82003760)	8th and Washington Streets; 40°20′16″N 75°55′18″W	Reading	
22	Cotton and Maple Streets School	Cotton and Maple Streets School	July 17, 1986 (#86001676)	Cotton and Maple Streets; 40°19′42″N 75°55′05″W	Reading	
23	Curtis and Jones Company Shoe Factory	Curtis and Jones Company Shoe Factory	April 28, 2014 (#14000182)	702 North 8th Street; 40°20′47″N 75°55′20″W	Reading	
24	Dale Furnace and Forge Historic District	Dale Furnace and Forge Historic District	September 6, 1991 (#91001134)	Forgedale Road northwest of Bally; 40°25′21″N 75°37′01″W	Washington Township	
25	Dauberville Bridge	Dauberville Bridge	June 22, 1988 (#88000788)	Belleman's Church Road over the Schuylkill River at Dauberville; 40°27′25″N 75°58′37″W	Centre and Ontelaunee Townships	
26	Davies House	Davies House	November 14, 1982 (#82001530)	Berkley Road in Berkley; 40°25′39″N 75°56′06″W	Ontelaunee Township	
27	H.K. Deisher Knitting Mill	H.K. Deisher Knitting Mill	September 5, 1985 (#85001963)	56 Noble Street; 40°30′58″N 75°46′36″W	Kutztown	
28	George Douglass House	George Douglass House	June 25, 2009 (#09000462)	19 Old Philadelphia Pike; 40°15′15″N 75°43′34″W	Amity Township	
29	Dreibelbis Mill	Dreibelbis Mill	November 8, 1990 (#90001614)	Junction of Dreibelbis Mill and Bellevue Roads; 40°30′22″N 75°57′23″W	Perry Township	
30	Dreibelbis Station Bridge	Dreibelbis Station Bridge	February 23, 1981 (#81000530)	South of Lenhartsville on Township 745; 40°33′17″N 75°52′48″W	Greenwich Township	
31	Joel Dreibelbis Farm	Joel Dreibelbis Farm	October 30, 1989 (#89001820)	Pennsylvania Route 143 near Virginville; 40°31′07″N 75°52′27″W	Richmond Township	
32	First National Bank in Fleetwood	First National Bank in Fleetwood	May 20, 2005 (#05000449)	Main and Franklin Street; 40°27′20″N 75°49′06″W	Fleetwood	
33	First Reformed Church	First Reformed Church	August 13, 2025 (#100012115)	621 Washington Street; 40°20′13″N 75°55′30″W	Reading	
34	Henry Fisher House	Henry Fisher House	June 4, 1973 (#73001591)	About 1.25 miles (2.01 km) north of Yellow House on Pennsylvania Route 662; 40°20′27″N 75°45′40″W	Oley Township	
35	Charles S. Foos Elementary School	Charles S. Foos Elementary School	November 10, 1983 (#83004191)	Douglass and Weiser Streets; 40°20′52″N 75°56′18″W	Reading	
36	French Creek State Park: Six Penny Day Use District	French Creek State Park: Six Penny Day Use District	February 11, 1987 (#87000054)	7 miles (11 km) northeast of Morgantown on Pennsylvania Route 345; 40°14′00″N 75°47′42″W	Union Township	
37	French Creek State Park: Organized Group Camp 4 District	French Creek State Park: Organized Group Camp 4 District	February 12, 1987 (#87000104)	7 miles (11 km) northeast of Morgantown on Pennsylvania Route 345; 40°11′58″N 75°47′43″W	Union Township	
38	John Gehman Farm	John Gehman Farm	May 7, 1992 (#92000398)	Township Road north of Harlem; 40°28′08″N 75°35′09″W	Hereford Township	
39	Geiger Mill	Geiger Mill	November 8, 1990 (#90001738)	Junction of Mill Road and Hay Creek Road in Geiger; 40°12′00″N 75°50′15″W	Robeson Township	
40	Grand View Dairy Farm	Grand View Dairy Farm	July 29, 1992 (#92000933)	Preston Road south of Wernersville; 40°18′42″N 76°04′56″W	South Heidelberg Township	
41	Greisemer's Mill Bridge	Greisemer's Mill Bridge	February 23, 1981 (#81000532)	Northwest of Boyerstown on Township 579; 40°21′46″N 75°44′18″W	Oley Township	
42	Griesemer-Brown Mill Complex	Griesemer-Brown Mill Complex	November 8, 1990 (#90001616)	Brown's Mill Road at Monocacy Creek; 40°18′08″N 75°46′57″W	Amity Township	
43	Grimshaw Silk Mill	Grimshaw Silk Mill	January 31, 1985 (#85000176)	1200 North 1100 Street; 40°21′10″N 75°54′58″W	Reading	
44	Gruber Wagon Works	Gruber Wagon Works	June 2, 1972 (#72001092)	West of Reading off Pennsylvania Route 183 in Tulpehocken Creek Park; 40°22′13″N 75°58′45″W	Bern Township	
45	Guldin Mill	Guldin Mill	November 8, 1990 (#90001617)	Off Pennsylvania Route 73 southeast of junction with U.S. Route 222; 40°26′08″N 75°52′42″W	Maidencreek Township	
46	Hain Mill	Hain Mill	November 8, 1990 (#90001618)	Junction of Hain Mill Road and Township 495; 40°21′16″N 76°04′58″W	Lower Heidelberg Township	
47	Hamburg Armory	Hamburg Armory	May 9, 1991 (#91000511)	North 5th Street, south of Interstate 78; 40°33′41″N 75°58′49″W	Hamburg	
48	Hamburg Historic District	Hamburg Historic District	June 28, 2010 (#10000398)	Roughly bounded by Franklin, Windsor, Walnut and Second Sts., Quince, Primrose, Peach and Plum Alleys and Mill Creek; 40°33′20″N 75°58′55″W	Hamburg	
49	Hamburg Public Library	Hamburg Public Library	November 3, 1988 (#88002369)	35 North 3rd Street; 40°33′21″N 75°59′04″W	Hamburg	
50	Hampden Firehouse	Hampden Firehouse	April 13, 1982 (#82003761)	1101 Greenwich Street; 40°20′39″N 75°54′57″W	Reading	
51	Hartman Cider Press	Hartman Cider Press	January 7, 1988 (#87002205)	Keim Road, 1.1 miles (1.8 km) west of Lobachsville; 40°24′39″N 75°44′58″W	Pike Township	
52	Hawk Mountain Sanctuary District	Hawk Mountain Sanctuary District	April 8, 2022 (#100007555)	1700 Hawk Mountain Rd. (Hawk Mountain Sanctuary); 40°38′00″N 75°59′12″W	Albany	
53	Hendel Brothers, Sons and Company Hat Factory	Hendel Brothers, Sons and Company Hat Factory	November 20, 1979 (#79002168)	517-539 South 5th Street; 40°19′32″N 75°55′35″W	Reading	
54	Hopewell Furnace National Historic Site	Hopewell Furnace National Historic Site	October 15, 1966 (#66000645)	5 miles (8.0 km) south of Birdsboro; 40°12′20″N 75°46′06″W	Union Township	Extends into Chester County
55	Hotel Abraham Lincoln	Hotel Abraham Lincoln	December 21, 2017 (#100001908)	100 N. 5th St. 40°20′14″N 75°55′40″W	Reading	
56	Hottenstein Mansion	Hottenstein Mansion	June 22, 1972 (#72001091)	2 miles (3.2 km) east of Kutztown on U.S. Route 222; 40°32′06″N 75°44′36″W	Maxatawny Township	
57	Hunter's Mill Complex	Hunter's Mill Complex	December 22, 1988 (#88003045)	Forgedale Road; 40°25′41″N 75°37′15″W	Hereford Township	
58	Ironstone Bridge	Ironstone Bridge	June 22, 1988 (#88000789)	Farmington Avenue over Ironstone Creek; 40°19′12″N 75°39′08″W	Douglass Township	
59	Joanna Furnace Complex	Joanna Furnace Complex	April 23, 1980 (#80003426)	North of Morgantown on Pennsylvania Route 10; 40°11′28″N 75°53′22″W	Robeson Township	
60	Nicholas Johnson Mill	Nicholas Johnson Mill	November 8, 1990 (#90001619)	Mill Crest Road; 40°20′58″N 75°37′12″W	Colebrookdale Township	
61	Kauffman Mill	Kauffman Mill	November 8, 1990 (#90001620)	Junction of Mill and Mill Hill Roads; 40°31′30″N 76°03′47″W	Upper Bern Township	
62	Keim Homestead	Keim Homestead	May 1, 1974 (#74001752)	West of Lobachsville; 40°24′35″N 75°44′54″W	Pike Township	
63	Kemp's Hotel	Kemp's Hotel	December 19, 1978 (#78002344)	East of Kutztown on U.S. Route 222; 40°31′48″N 75°45′48″W	Maxatawny Township	
64	Keystone Hook and Ladder Company	Keystone Hook and Ladder Company	October 31, 1985 (#85003447)	2nd and Penn Streets; 40°20′06″N 75°56′01″W	Reading	
65	Kissling Farm	Kissling Farm	July 29, 1992 (#92000934)	Brownsville Road east of Robesonia; 40°22′03″N 76°06′05″W	Heidelberg Township	
66	Knabb-Bieber Mill	Knabb-Bieber Mill	November 8, 1990 (#90001621)	Bieber Mill Road at Monocacy Creek; 40°21′33″N 75°48′38″W	Oley Township	
67	Knorr-Bare Farm	Knorr-Bare Farm	July 29, 1992 (#92000935)	4995 Penn Avenue; 40°19′23″N 76°03′43″W	Lower Heidelberg Township	
68	Kutz Mill	Kutz Mill	November 8, 1990 (#90001622)	Kutz Mill Road at Sacony Creek; 40°32′03″N 75°48′20″W	Greenwich Township	
69	Kutz's Mill Bridge	Kutz's Mill Bridge	February 23, 1981 (#81000531)	Northwest of Kutztown on Township 798; 40°32′04″N 75°48′21″W	Greenwich Township	
70	Kutztown 1892 Public School Building	Kutztown 1892 Public School Building	June 27, 1980 (#80003425)	Whiteoak Street and Normal Avenue; 40°30′47″N 75°46′34″W	Kutztown	
71	Kutztown Silk Mill		May 14, 2025 (#100010535)	40 Willow Street; 40°31′11″N 75°46′26″W	Kutztown	
72	Leesport Lock House	Leesport Lock House	June 9, 1977 (#77001123)	Wall Street; 40°26′48″N 75°58′04″W	Leesport	
73	Jacob Leiby Farm	Jacob Leiby Farm	July 29, 1992 (#92000936)	Pennsylvania Route 143; 40°32′05″N 75°52′40″W	Perry Township	
74	Lenhart Farm	Lenhart Farm	September 18, 1978 (#78002345)	Junction of U.S. Route 22 and Pennsylvania Route 143; 40°34′33″N 75°53′18″W	Lenhartsville	
75	Lerch Tavern	Lerch Tavern	September 12, 1979 (#79002171)	182-184 West Penn Avenue; 40°19′47″N 76°05′03″W	Wernersville	
76	Levan Farm	Levan Farm	December 19, 1978 (#78002348)	Pennsylvania Route 562; 40°19′12″N 75°51′34″W	Exeter Township	
77	Liberty Fire Company No. 5	Liberty Fire Company No. 5	January 18, 1985 (#85000112)	501 South 5th Street; 40°19′39″N 75°55′36″W	Reading	
78	Mordecai Lincoln House	Mordecai Lincoln House	November 3, 1988 (#88002370)	Lincoln Road in Lorane; 40°16′53″N 75°50′02″W	Exeter Township	
79	Lindbergh Viaduct	Lindbergh Viaduct	June 22, 1988 (#88000792)	Mineral Spring Road over Mineral Spring Creek; 40°19′52″N 75°54′00″W	Reading	
80	Livingood House-Stryker Hospital	Livingood House-Stryker Hospital	November 7, 1996 (#96001195)	417-419 Walnut Street; 40°20′14″N 75°55′45″W	Reading	
81	Log House, Hiester House and Market Annex	Log House, Hiester House and Market Annex	November 20, 1979 (#79002169)	30 South 4th Street; 40°20′03″N 75°55′49″W	Reading	
82	Long-Hawerter Mill	Long-Hawerter Mill	November 8, 1990 (#90001623)	Longsdale Road at Little Lehigh Creek; 40°29′21″N 75°39′50″W	Longswamp Township	
83	John F. Lutz Furniture Co. & Funerary	John F. Lutz Furniture Co. & Funerary	February 16, 1996 (#96000085)	3559 and 3561 St. Lawrence Avenue; 40°19′33″N 75°51′51″W	St. Lawrence	
84	Mary Ann Furnace Historic District	Mary Ann Furnace Historic District	September 6, 1991 (#91001141)	Centennial Road southeast of Longswamp; 40°29′05″N 75°38′54″W	Longswamp Township	
85	Meinig Glove Factory-E. Richard Meinig Co.	Meinig Glove Factory-E. Richard Meinig Co.	August 30, 1985 (#85001896)	621-641 McKnight Street; 40°20′44″N 75°56′13″W	Reading	
86	Merit Underwear Company	Merit Underwear Company	June 28, 1996 (#96000711)	43 East Noble Avenue; 40°30′06″N 75°58′06″W	Shoemakersville	
87	Merkel Mill	Merkel Mill	November 8, 1990 (#90001625)	Dreibelbis Station Road at Maiden Creek; 40°34′13″N 75°52′49″W	Greenwich Township	
88	Merkel Mill Complex	Merkel Mill Complex	November 8, 1990 (#90001626)	Junction of Pennsylvania Routes 662 and 143 near Moselem Springs; 40°30′02″N 75°51′03″W	Richmond Township	
89	Metropolitan Edison Building	Metropolitan Edison Building	October 28, 1983 (#83004192)	412 Washington Street; 40°20′11″N 75°55′46″W	Reading	
90	Mill at Lobachsville	Mill at Lobachsville	November 8, 1990 (#90001624)	Mill Road at Pine Creek; 40°24′43″N 75°43′51″W	Pike Township	
91	Mill Tract Farm	Mill Tract Farm	September 22, 1977 (#77001124)	Northeast of Stonersville on Mill Road; 40°19′30″N 75°47′26″W	Exeter Township	
92	Morgantown Historic District	Morgantown Historic District	November 7, 1995 (#95001255)	Roughly the area surrounding Main Street between Walnut and Washington Streets in Morgantown; 40°09′20″N 75°53′25″W	Caernarvon Township	
93	Moselem Farms Mill	Moselem Farms Mill	November 8, 1990 (#90001627)	Junction of Pennsylvania Route 662 and Forge Road; 40°30′08″N 75°52′47″W	Richmond Township	
94	John Nicholas and Elizabeth Moyer House	John Nicholas and Elizabeth Moyer House	May 2, 2001 (#01000459)	152 Hetrick Road; 40°25′29″N 76°10′34″W	Jefferson Township	
95	Old Dry Road	Old Dry Road	January 23, 1978 (#78002349)	3 miles (4.8 km) northwest of Wernersville on Highland Road; 40°22′26″N 76°03′30″W	Lower Heidelberg Township	
96	Old Main at the Lutheran Home at Topton	Old Main at the Lutheran Home at Topton	January 28, 2015 (#14000183)	1 S. Home Ave. 40°29′40″N 75°41′56″W	Longswamp Township	
97	Old Swede's House	Old Swede's House	January 21, 1974 (#74001751)	Old Philadelphia Pike in Douglassville; 40°15′12″N 75°43′42″W	Amity Township	
98	Old St. Gabriel's Episcopal Church	Old St. Gabriel's Episcopal Church	March 8, 1978 (#78002343)	U.S. Route 422 in Douglassville; 40°15′26″N 75°43′45″W	Amity Township	
99	Oley Township Historic District	Oley Township Historic District	March 11, 1983 (#83002218)	Pennsylvania Route 73; 40°22′07″N 75°46′17″W	Oley Township	Includes the entire township
100	Pagoda	Pagoda	November 7, 1972 (#72001093)	Mount Penn, at the junction of Duryea Drive and Skyline Boulevard; 40°20′09″N 75°54′22″W	Reading	
101	Pine Forge Mansion and Industrial Site	Pine Forge Mansion and Industrial Site	March 18, 2004 (#04000191)	Pine Forge Road and Douglass Drive, Pine Forge; 40°17′02″N 75°42′19″W	Douglass Township	
102	Pleasantville Bridge	Pleasantville Bridge	February 23, 1981 (#81000533)	South of Mantawny on Township 916; 40°22′44″N 75°44′21″W	Oley Township	
103	Queen Anne Historic District	Queen Anne Historic District	November 12, 2004 (#04001227)	Roughly bounded by Robeson Street, North 3rd Street, railroad tracks, and Clinton Street; 40°20′55″N 75°56′13″W	Reading	
104	Reading Country Club	Reading Country Club	May 31, 2018 (#100002521)	5311 Perkiomen Ave; 40°18′12″N 75°50′57″W	Exeter Township	
105	Reading Hardware Company	Reading Hardware Company	June 13, 1997 (#97000516)	Roughly bounded by Willow, South 6th, and Canal Streets, and alleyway 40°19′32″N 75°55′38″W	Reading	
106	Reading Hardware Company Butt Works	Reading Hardware Company Butt Works	November 20, 1979 (#79002170)	537 Willow Street; 40°19′29″N 75°55′33″W	Reading	
107	Reading Knitting Mills	Reading Knitting Mills	April 13, 1982 (#82003762)	350 Elm Street; 40°20′23″N 75°55′49″W	Reading	
108	Red Men Hall	Red Men Hall	July 27, 2000 (#00000843)	831-833 Walnut Street; 40°20′21″N 75°55′21″W	Reading	Now known as Century Hall Apartments.
109	Reiff Farm	Reiff Farm	February 25, 1982 (#82003759)	Southwest of Oley on Township 454; 40°22′55″N 75°48′30″W	Oley Township	
110	Rhoads-Lorah House and Barn	Rhoads-Lorah House and Barn	March 29, 2007 (#07000216)	1832 Old Swede Road; 40°19′03″N 75°45′14″W	Amity Township	
111	Ridgewood Farm	Ridgewood Farm	May 7, 1992 (#92000399)	Junction of Pennsylvania Route 724 and Interstate 176; 40°17′43″N 75°53′50″W	Cumru Township	
112	Rieser Mill	Rieser Mill	November 8, 1990 (#90001628)	Junction of Grange and Cross Keys Roads; 40°25′55″N 75°58′37″W	Bern Township	
113	Rieser-Shoemaker Farm	Rieser-Shoemaker Farm	July 29, 1992 (#92000939)	Cross Keys Road; 40°25′51″N 75°58′25″W	Bern Township	
114	Robesonia Furnace Historic District	Robesonia Furnace Historic District	September 6, 1991 (#91001128)	Furnace, South Church and Freeman Streets and Mountain and East Meadow Avenues; 40°20′34″N 76°08′26″W	Robesonia	
115	S Bridge	S Bridge	June 22, 1988 (#88000794)	Legislative Route 06024 over Tulpehocken Creek west of Womelsdorf; 40°22′25″N 76°13′07″W	Marion Township	Demolished 2011.
116	St. Michael's Protestant Episcopal Church, Parish House and Rectory	St. Michael's Protestant Episcopal Church, Parish House and Rectory	December 20, 1982 (#82001531)	Mill and Church Streets; 40°15′54″N 75°48′26″W	Birdsboro	
117	Sally Ann Furnace Complex	Sally Ann Furnace Complex	August 17, 1976 (#76001604)	Southwest of Topton; 40°28′19″N 75°43′22″W	Rockland Township	
118	Schaumboch's Tavern	Schaumboch's Tavern	November 20, 1979 (#79002166)	Northwest of Hamburg on Hawk Mountain Road; 40°38′00″N 75°58′52″W	Albany Township	
119	Christian Schlegel Farm	Christian Schlegel Farm	July 29, 1992 (#92000938)	Fleetwood-Lyons Road; 40°27′32″N 75°49′19″W	Richmond Township	
120	Seyfert Mill	Seyfert Mill	November 8, 1990 (#90001629)	Junction of Old U.S. Route 22 and Campsite Road; 40°30′35″N 76°07′34″W	Upper Tulpehocken Township	
121	Siegfried's Dale Farm	Siegfried's Dale Farm	May 10, 1984 (#84003115)	Siegfried's Road; 40°32′58″N 75°43′23″W	Maxatawny Township	
122	Snyder Mill	Snyder Mill	November 8, 1990 (#90001630)	Oley Line Road at Monocacy Creek; 40°20′12″N 75°48′18″W	Exeter Township	
123	Spannuth Mill	Spannuth Mill	November 8, 1990 (#90001631)	Junction of Frystown and Crosskill Creek Roads; 40°26′51″N 76°21′17″W	Bethel Township	
124	Peter Spicker House	Peter Spicker House	April 22, 1983 (#83002217)	150 Main Street in Stouchsburg; 40°22′52″N 76°14′13″W	Marion Township	
125	Stein Mill	Stein Mill	November 8, 1990 (#90001632)	Pennsylvania Route 737 at Mill Creek; 40°33′11″N 75°48′12″W	Greenwich Township	
126	Stirling	Stirling	April 17, 1980 (#80003427)	1120 Centre Avenue; 40°21′09″N 75°56′03″W	Reading	
127	Stouchsburg Historic District	Stouchsburg Historic District	January 8, 1985 (#85000071)	12 to 153 Main Street and Water Street in Stouchsburg; 40°22′46″N 76°13′52″W	Marion Township	
128	Stupp-Oxenrider Farm	Stupp-Oxenrider Farm	July 29, 1992 (#92000932)	Dundore Road northwest of Robesonia; 40°22′56″N 76°09′27″W	North Heidelberg Township	
129	Thompson Mill	Thompson Mill	November 8, 1990 (#90001633)	Golf Course Road at Seidel Creek; 40°16′38″N 75°51′48″W	Robeson Township	
130	Trexler Historic District	Trexler Historic District	September 7, 2001 (#01000957)	375-424 Old Philadelphia Pike; 40°38′09″N 75°51′12″W	Albany Township	
131	Trinity Lutheran Church	Trinity Lutheran Church	June 7, 1976 (#76001603)	6th and Washington Streets; 40°20′13″N 75°55′35″W	Reading	
132	Tulpehocken Creek Historic District	Tulpehocken Creek Historic District	March 28, 1985 (#85000672)	Tulpehocken and Mill Creeks from the Berks-Lebanon county line to the Blue Marsh Dam between Millardsville and Bernville; 40°23′13″N 76°11′21″W	Marion, North Heidelberg, and Lower Heidelberg Townships	
133	John Updike Childhood Home	John Updike Childhood Home	April 22, 2019 (#100003635)	117 Philadelphia Ave. 40°18′08″N 75°57′54″W	Shillington	
134	Virginville Historic District	Virginville Historic District	September 28, 2000 (#00001123)	Main, 2nd, 1st, and Front Streets and Chapel Drive in Virginville; 40°31′24″N 75°52′14″W	Richmond Township	
135	Peter Wanner Mansion	Peter Wanner Mansion	November 5, 1987 (#87001950)	1401 Walnut Street; 40°20′18″N 75°54′27″W	Reading	
136	Weidner Mill	Weidner Mill	November 8, 1990 (#90001634)	Blacksmith Road at Manatawny Creek; 40°18′18″N 75°43′37″W	Amity Township	
137	Conrad Weiser House	Conrad Weiser House	October 15, 1966 (#66000646)	2 miles (3.2 km) east of Womelsdorf; 40°21′33″N 76°10′26″W	Heidelberg Township	
138	Wertz Mill	Wertz Mill	November 8, 1990 (#90001635)	60 Werner Street; 40°19′41″N 76°04′47″W	Wernersville	
139	Wertz's Covered Bridge	Wertz's Covered Bridge	November 17, 1978 (#78002347)	Northwest of Reading on Township 921; 40°22′07″N 75°58′44″W	Bern and Spring Townships	
140	White Horse Tavern	White Horse Tavern	April 21, 1975 (#75001618)	509 Old Philadelphia Pike in Douglassville; 40°15′13″N 75°43′31″W	Amity Township	
141	Wilhelm Mansion and Carriage House	Wilhelm Mansion and Carriage House	March 1, 1982 (#82003763)	730 Centre Avenue; 40°20′47″N 75°55′52″W	Reading	
142	Thomas A. Willson and Co.	Thomas A. Willson and Co.	May 24, 2006 (#06000428)	201 Washington Street; 40°20′20″N 75°56′09″W	Reading	
143	Womelsdorf Historic District	Womelsdorf Historic District	March 10, 1982 (#82003764)	Roughly bounded by Water, 4th, Franklin and Jefferson Streets; 40°21′47″N 76°11′13″W	Womelsdorf	
144	Yoder Mill	Yoder Mill	November 8, 1990 (#90001636)	Yoder Road at Oysterville Creek; 40°23′48″N 75°43′14″W	Pike Township	

== Former listing ==
	Name on the Register	Image	Date listed	Date removed	Location	City or town	Description
1	Astor Theater		January 5, 1978 (#78002346)	June 5, 2000	730-742 Penn Street	Reading	

== See also ==
- List of National Historic Landmarks in Pennsylvania
- List of Pennsylvania state historical markers in Berks County
- National Register of Historic Places listings in Pennsylvania
