= Monocacy Creek =

Monocacy Creek may refer to:

- Monocacy Creek (Lehigh River tributary), a tributary of the Lehigh River in Pennsylvania
- Monocacy Creek (Schuylkill River), a tributary of the Schuylkill River in Pennsylvania

== See also ==
- Little Monocacy River, a tributary of the Potomac River in Maryland
- Monocacy (disambiguation)
