= List of Pennsylvania state historical markers in Berks County =

Location of Berks County in Pennsylvania

This is a list of the Pennsylvania state historical markers in Berks County.

This is intended to be a complete list of the official state historical markers placed in Berks County, Pennsylvania by the Pennsylvania Historical and Museum Commission (PHMC). The locations of the historical markers, as well as the latitude and longitude coordinates as provided by the PHMC's database, are included below when available. There are 66 historical markers located in Berks County.

== Historical markers ==
Marker title	Image	Date dedicated	Location	Marker type	Topics
Anthony Sadowski		September 18, 1966	U.S. 422 eastbound near graveyard, Douglassville; 40.25775°N 75.72897°W	Roadside	Early Settlement, Ethnic & Immigration, Government & Politics, Government & Politics 18th Century, Native American
Baird House		September 15, 1950	5th & Washington Sts., SW corner, Reading (Missing)	City	Environment, Professions & Vocations
Ben Austrian		June 17, 1995	New Bethel Union Church Cemetery, RD 2, Kempton; 40.63282°N 75.89217°W	Roadside	Artists
Berks County		May 12, 1982	Courthouse, N. 6th & Court Sts., Reading; 40.33648°N 75.92587°W	City	Government & Politics, Government & Politics 18th Century, Iron
Bethel A.M.E. Church		May 11, 1996	119 N. 10th St., Reading; 40.34255°N 75.9256°W	City	African American, Buildings, Religion, Underground Railroad
Carl A. Spaatz		June 27, 1991	Pa. 562 (S. Reading Ave.) at W. 2nd St., Boyertown; 40.33177°N 75.64163°W	Roadside	Military, Military Post-Civil War
Charming Forge		April 30, 1947	U.S. 422, Womelsdorf; 40.36577°N 76.17993°W	Roadside	American Revolution, Buildings, Business & Industry, Iron, Professions & Vocations
Christ Little Tulpehocken Church		June 12, 1963	SR 4010 W of Bernville; 40.42213°N 76.13218°W	Roadside	Buildings, Religion
Colebrookdale Furnace		n/a	Pa. 562 near SR 2040 SW of Boyertown; 40.32323°N 75.65392°W	Roadside	Business & Industry, Furnaces, Iron
Conrad Weiser		April 29, 1947	U.S. 422, Weiser Homestead, E of Womelsdorf; 40.36013°N 76.17213°W	Roadside	Early Settlement, Government & Politics, Native American
Conrad Weiser Trading Post		February 16, 1951	505 Penn St., Penn Sq., Reading; 40.33555°N 75.92775°W	City	Buildings, Early Settlement, Government & Politics, Native American, Professions & Vocations
Daniel Boone		n/a	U.S. 422, 2 miles SE of Baumstown; 40.26767°N 75.76107°W	Roadside	Education, Houses & Homesteads, Professions & Vocations
Daniel Boone		April 1, 1947	U.S. 422 westbound at SR 2041 just E of Baumstown; U.S. 422 eastbound at Baumstown Union Sunday School; 40.27938°N 75.80183°W	Roadside	Education, Houses & Homesteads, Professions & Vocations
Daniel Boone (1734-1820) - PLAQUE		n/a	US 422 between Baumstown and Douglassville; 40.26756°N 75.76106°W	Plaque	Exploration
Daniel Boone Homestead		n/a	SR 2041 N of Baumstown; 40.29073°N 75.79435°W	Roadside	Buildings, Early Settlement, Houses & Homesteads
De Benneville House		December 4, 1948	Pa. 622, 1.5 miles N of Yellow House; 40.34335°N 75.7618°W	Roadside	Houses & Homesteads, Religion
De Turk House		December 4, 1948	Junction PA 73 & Memorial Hwy. (PA 662), near DeTurk Rd., just S of Oley; 40.38373°N 75.78669°W	Roadside	Early Settlement, Ethnic & Immigration, Religion
Doctor Jonathan Potts		February 16, 1951	545 Penn St., Penn Sq., Reading; 40.33543°N 75.92632°W	City	American Revolution, Military
Dr. Bodo Otto		February 16, 1951	525 Penn St., Penn Sq., Reading; 40.33555°N 75.92775°W	City	American Revolution, Medicine & Science, Military, Professions & Vocations
Duryea Drive		May 17, 1951	Intersection of Clymer & 13th Sts. at Park Dr., Reading; 40.33473°N 75.91112°W	Roadside	Business & Industry, Invention, Oil & Gas, Professions & Vocations, Transportation
Duryea Drive		May 17, 1951	In Reading at 1st curve on road to Pagoda, about 65' from curve	Roadside	Business & Industry, Invention, Oil & Gas, Professions & Vocations, Transportation
Duryea Drive		May 17, 1951	In Reading, on Mount Penn at Pagoda; 40.33607°N 75.90565°W	Roadside	Business & Industry, Invention, Oil & Gas, Professions & Vocations, Transportation
Eight-Cornered School		June 10, 1948	U.S. 422 in Sinking Spring (Missing)	City	Education, Religion
Exeter Friends Meeting		May 7, 1979	Meetinghouse Road, .5 mile S of Pa. 562 & 2 mile W of Yellow House; 40.3129°N 75.78443°W	Roadside	Abraham Lincoln, Buildings, Religion
Federal Inn		February 16, 1951	445 Penn St., Penn Sq., Reading; 40.33543°N 75.92822°W	City	Buildings, Business & Industry, George Washington, Military, Inns & Taverns, Whiskey Rebellion
Fisher House		August 28, 1948	Pa. 622, 1.4 miles N of Yellow House; 40.34113°N 75.76095°W	Roadside	Buildings, Houses & Homesteads
Fort Henry		June 18, 1959	Pa. 501, 2 miles N of Bethel; 40.49178°N 76.31645°W	Roadside	Forts, French & Indian War, Military
Goshenhoppen		April 30, 1947	Pa. 100 (7th & Main Sts.), Bally; 40.40268°N 75.58588°W	Roadside	Early Settlement, Education, Religion
Hawk Mountain Sanctuary		September 14, 2019	Hawk Mountain Road, at path to North Lookout; 40.63494°N 75.98698°W	Roadside	Education, Environment, Science & Medicine, Sports & Recreation, Women
Henry A. Muhlenberg		February 16, 1951	400 Penn St., Reading; 40.33523°N 75.9297°W	City	Government & Politics, Religion
Hereford Furnace		May 5, 1967	Pa. 29 & 100 at junction SR 1010, Hereford; 40.4497°N 75.55232°W	Roadside	Business & Industry, Furnaces, Iron
Hessian Camp		October 1, 1949	Mineral Spring Rd. (Business U.S. 422 westbound) at 18th St., Reading; 40.33168°N 75.90163°W	Roadside	American Revolution, Ethnic & Immigration
Hessian Camp		October 1, 1949	Pa. 73 & U.S. 422, Mineral Spring Park (Missing)	Roadside	Ethnic & Immigration
Hiester Home		February 16, 1951	439 Penn St., Penn Sq., Reading; 40.33542°N 75.92862°W	City	American Revolution, Government & Politics, Governors, Houses & Homesteads, Military
Hopewell Village		August 28, 1948	Pa. 10, S of Plowville	Roadside	Business & Industry, Furnaces, Iron
Hopewell Village		March 29, 1947	U.S. 422 east & westbound at Pa. 82, Baumstown; 40.28077°N 75.8057°W	Roadside	Business & Industry, Furnaces, Iron
Hunter Liggett		December 30, 1984	145 S. 6th St. at Chestnut, Reading; 40.33232°N 75.92593°W	City	Military, Military Post-Civil War
James Maurer (1864-1944)		September 8, 2006	Heritage Park near Workers' Memorial, 8th & Canal Sts., Reading; 40.32493°N 75.92622°W	Roadside	Government & Politics 20th Century, Labor
Jeremiah Sweinhart and Successors		April 17, 1994	3rd. & Walnut Sts., Boyertown; 40.33315°N 75.64012°W	Roadside	Agriculture, Business & Industry, Entrepreneurs, Military, Transportation
John A. Shulze		September 6, 1951	Conrad Weiser Pkwy. (US 422) at Main St. & Longs Church Ln., outside Stouchsburg; 40.38383°N 76.24686°W	Roadside	Government & Politics, Government & Politics 19th Century, Governors
Joseph Hiester		March 27, 1947	Pa. 183 at SR 3051 & 3053 near Leinbachs; 40.38827°N 75.99267°W	Roadside	American Revolution, Government & Politics, Governors, Mansions & Manors, Military
Lincoln Homestead		March 29, 1947	5700 Perkiomen Ave. (US 422), near Lincoln Rd., Reading / Exeter Twp.	Roadside	Abraham Lincoln, Early Settlement, Government & Politics 18th Century, Houses & Homesteads
Northkill Amish		June 26, 1959	Old U.S. 22, 1 mile W of Shartlesville; 40.51207°N 76.11982°W	Roadside	Early Settlement, Native American, Religion
Oley Moravians		August 28, 1948	Memorial Hwy. (PA 622), near Mine Ln., 1 mile S of Oley; 40.37348°N 75.77713°W	Roadside	Early Settlement, Education, Religion
Penn's Common		February 16, 1951	Perkiomen Ave. (Business U.S. 422 westbound) at 11th & Penn Sts., Reading; 40.33505°N 75.91585°W	City	Government & Politics, Government & Politics 18th Century, William Penn
Pilger Ruh		April 22, 1950	Bethel Rd. (PA 501) at Pilger Ruh Rd., N of Bethel near Schuylkill Co. line 40.51327°N 76.33735°W	Roadside	Environment, Native American, Paths & Trails, Religion
Reading		n/a	Lancaster Ave. (Bus. 222) at Summit Ave., S end of city 40.36895°N 75.92688°W	Roadside	Business & Industry, Cities & Towns, Early Settlement, Ethnic & Immigration, Government & Politics
Reading		1948	U.S. 122 S	Roadside	Business & Industry, Cities & Towns, Early Settlement, Ethnic & Immigration, Government & Politics
Reading		1948	U.S. 122 N	Roadside	Business & Industry, Cities & Towns, Early Settlement, Ethnic & Immigration, Government & Politics
Reading		n/a	N 5th St. Hwy. / Allentown Pike (US 222) at N city line, just S of Warren St. Bypass (PA 12)	Roadside	Business & Industry, Cities & Towns, Early Settlement, Ethnic & Immigration, Government & Politics
Reading		n/a	Penn Ave. (Bus. Rt. 422) just W of Ben Franklin Hwy. / Conrad Weiser Pkwy. cloverleaf 40.33472°N 75.94073°W	Roadside	Business & Industry, Cities & Towns, Ethnic & Immigration
Reading Railroad Massacre		October 16, 1993	7th & Penn Sts., Reading; 40.33522°N 75.9242°W	City	Labor, Railroads, Transportation
Rhoads Opera House Fire		June 29, 2008	Fairview Cemetery, north side of W Philadelphia Ave., Boyertown	Roadside	Buildings, Government & Politics 20th Century
Robesonia Furnace		n/a	U.S. 422 (Penn Ave.) at Freeman St., Robesonia; 40.34977°N 76.1289°W	Roadside	Buildings, Business & Industry, Furnaces, Iron, Professions & Vocations
Skew Bridge		March 1, 1951	N. 6th St. at railroad bridge, near Woodward St., Reading; 40.34265°N 75.92572°W	City	Bridges, Railroads, Transportation
Solomon Boscov		August 3, 1999	1400 Block N. 9th St., Reading; 40.35635°N 75.91933°W	City	Business & Industry, Ethnic & Immigration
Swedish Pioneers		February 20, 1949	E Main St. / W Schuylkill Rd. (PA 724) just NW of River Bridge Rd., 5 miles SE of Birdsboro; 40.25273°N 75.72957°W	Roadside	Early Settlement, Ethnic & Immigration, Houses & Homesteads, William Penn
Thomas Mifflin		March 27, 1947	U.S. 222 (E. Lancaster Ave.) at Mifflin Blvd., Shillington; 40.307°N 75.95936°W	Roadside	American Revolution, Government & Politics, Government & Politics 18th Century, Governors, Military
Thomas Rutter		October 4, 1982	Pine Forge Academy off Pine Forge Rd. (SR 2063), Pine Forge; 40.281°N 75.70375°W	City	African American, Business & Industry, Education, Iron, Mansions & Manors, Professions & Vocations, Underground Railroad
Thompson's Rifle Battalion: Capt. George Nagel's Company		November 4, 1989	940 Centre Ave. (Pa. 61), Greenfield Manor section of Reading	Roadside	American Revolution, Military
Tulpehocken Path		March 19, 1952	Lancaster Ave. (PA 501) at Schubert Rd., just N of I-78/US22, 1 mile N of Bethel; 40.47822°N 76.2955°W	Roadside	Forts, French & Indian War, Military, Native American, Paths & Trails
Tulpehocken Path		July 16, 1951	Conrad Weiser Pkwy. / W Penn Ave. (US 422), at Conrad Weiser Homestead E of Womelsdorf; 40.36013°N 76.17213°W	Roadside	Government & Politics, Native American, Paths & Trails, Transportation, William Penn
Tulpehocken Path		July 16, 1951	PA 419 N of Host (Missing)	Roadside	Government & Politics, Native American, Paths & Trails, Transportation, William Penn
Union Canal		April 22, 1950	Morgantown Rd. (PA 10) & Philadelphia Ave. (PA 724), 2 miles S of Reading; 40.29778°N 75.92598°W	Roadside	Business & Industry, Canals, Mills, Navigation, Transportation
Union Canal		May 12, 1950	Pa. 183, .9 mile SE of Bernville	Roadside	Business & Industry, Canals, Mills, Navigation, Transportation
Union Canal		October 1950	Upper Van Reed Rd. near Tulpehocken Creek, .1 mile S of Leinbachs, Bernville	Roadside	Business & Industry, Canals, Mills, Navigation, Transportation
Wallace Stevens (1879-1955)		October 1, 2007	323 N 5th St., Reading; 40.3407°N 75.9277°W	City	Writers
William Penn - First Visit to America - PLAQUE		October 1, 1945	US 422, .8 mile SE of Baumstown (264 E Ben Franklin Hwy., Birdsboro); 40.27375°N 75.78053°W	Plaque	Exploration, William Penn
William Strong		February 16, 1951	NW corner, 5th & Court Sts., Reading; 40.33622°N 75.92788°W	City	Government & Politics, Government & Politics 19th Century, Professions & Vocations

== See also ==
- List of Pennsylvania state historical markers
- National Register of Historic Places listings in Berks County, Pennsylvania
