= Knabb-Bieber Mill =

- U.S. National Register of Historic Places
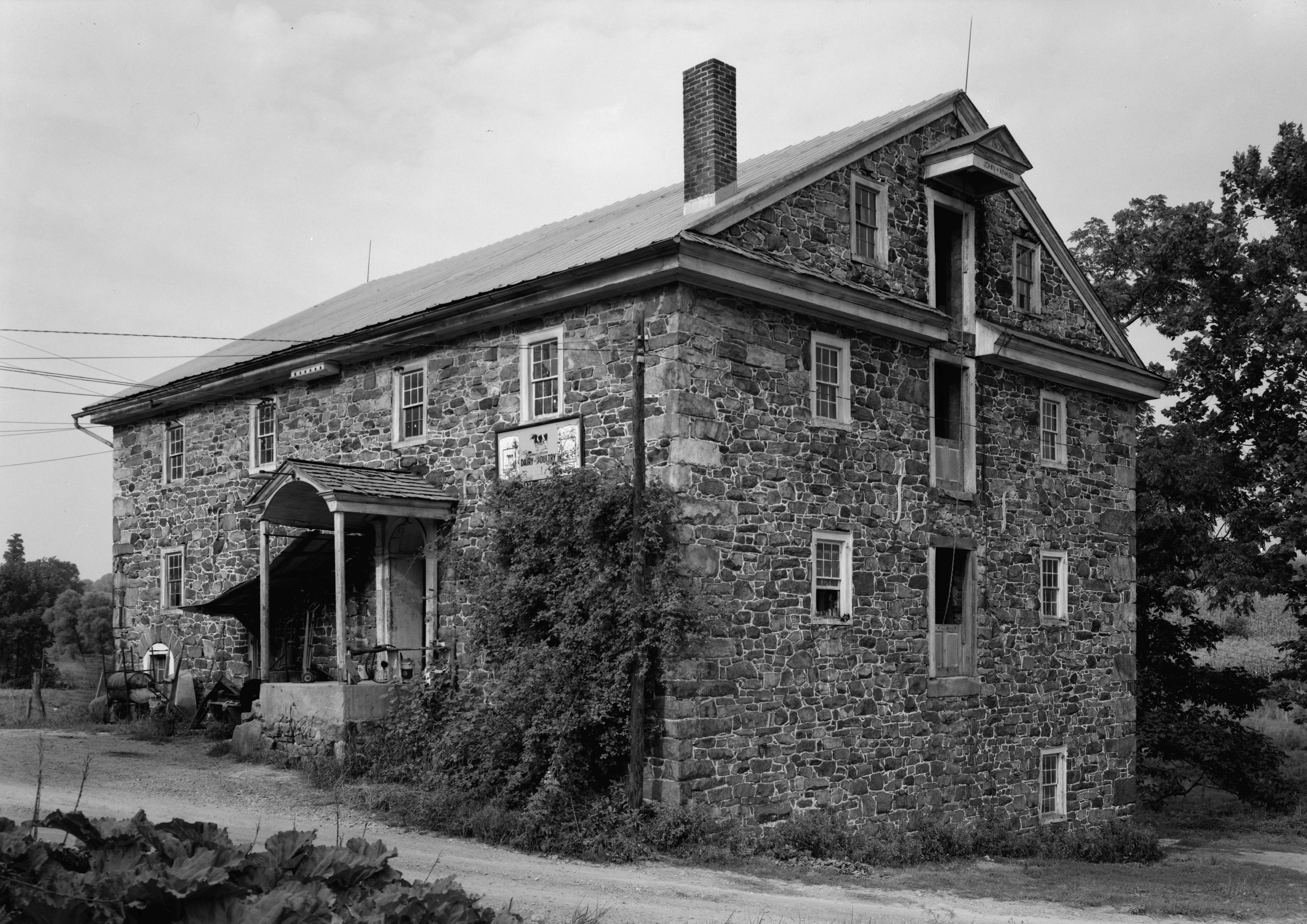
- Knabb-Bieber Mill, August 1958 (HABS Photo)

- Location within Pennsylvania Location within the United States
- Location: Bieber Mill Road at Monocacy Creek, Oley Township, Pennsylvania
- Coordinates: 40°21′33″N 75°48′38″W
- Area: 9 acres (3.6 ha)
- Built: 1809
- Architectural style: Gristmill
- MPS: Gristmills in Berks County MPS
- NRHP reference No.: 90001621
- Added to NRHP: November 8, 1990

The Knabb-Bieber Mill is located in Oley Township, Pennsylvania. The mill was built in 1809 and was added to the National Register of Historic Places on November 8, 1990.

== History and architectural features ==
This grist mill was built in 1809 for John Knabb and was acquired around 1875 by John Bieber by his marriage to Maggie Knabb. Their fourth son, Effinger Bieber, bought the property at auction. He married Mary Moyer. They had 11 children, eight of whom survived to adulthood. They shut down all mill operations shortly after Effenger fell and hit his head on macadam in the early 1990's. Like Effinger, she was in her 90s when she died.

The mill sits on a property of approximately twenty-five acres on Bieber Mill Road in the Oley Valley of Pennsylvania. Its equipment is powered by water from the Monocacy Creek.

== See also ==
- National Register of Historic Places listings in Berks County, Pennsylvania
