= Snyder Mill =

- U.S. National Register of Historic Places
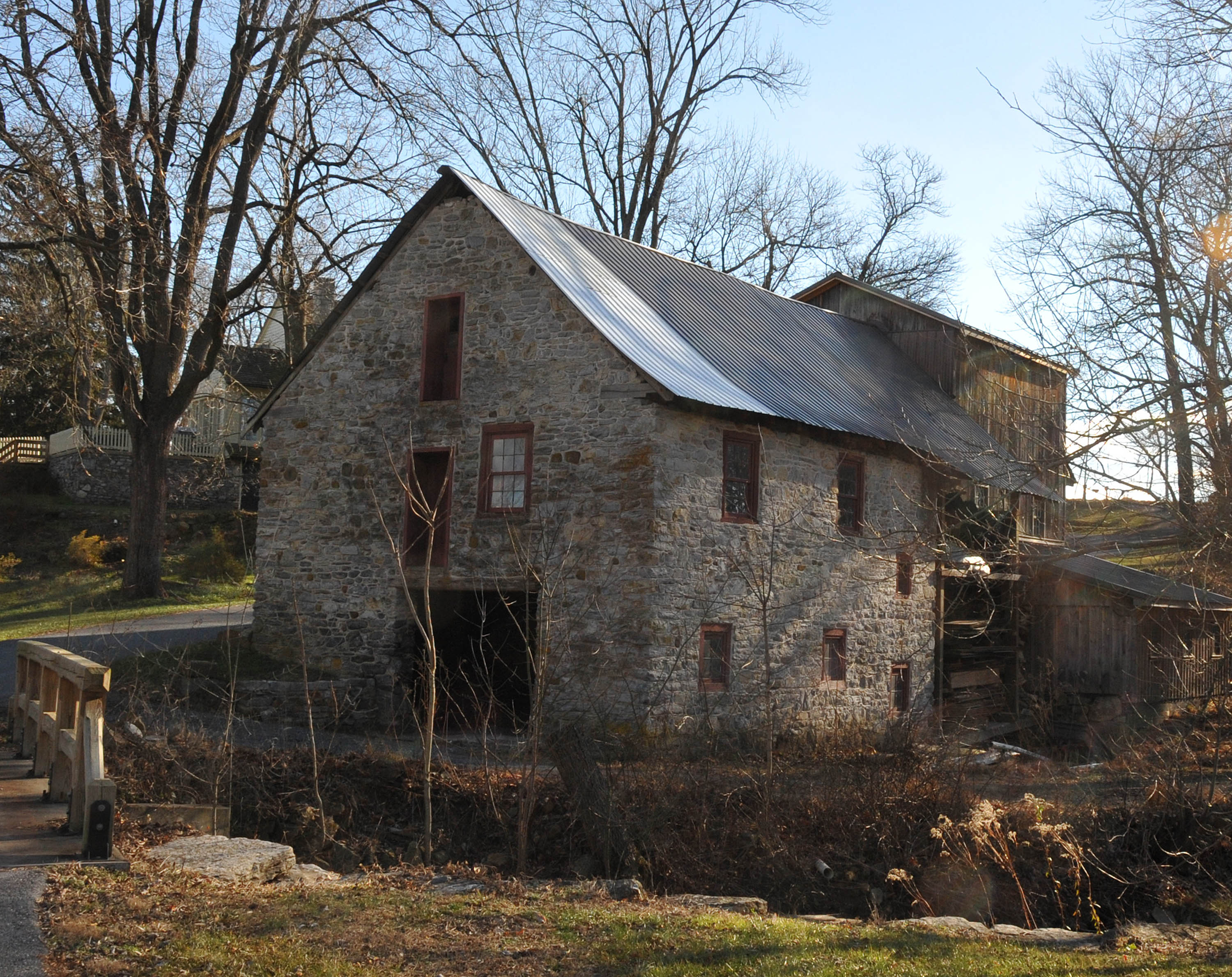

- Location within Pennsylvania Location within the United States
- Location: Oley Line Road at Monocacy Creek, Exeter Township, Pennsylvania
- Coordinates: 40°20′12″N 75°48′18″W
- Area: 1.5 acres (0.61 ha)
- Built: c. 1780
- Architectural style: Gristmill
- MPS: Gristmills in Berks County MPS
- NRHP reference No.: 90001630
- Added to NRHP: November 8, 1990

Snyder Mill is a historic grist mill located on Monocacy Creek in Exeter Township, Berks County, Pennsylvania. The mill was built about 1780, and is a 1 1/2-story, banked stone building. It measures 26 feet by 50 feet, with a frame addition of 20 feet, 3 inches, by 25 feet 10 inches. It retains a wooden water wheel. The mill ceased operations in 1930.

It was listed on the National Register of Historic Places in 1990.

== Gallery ==
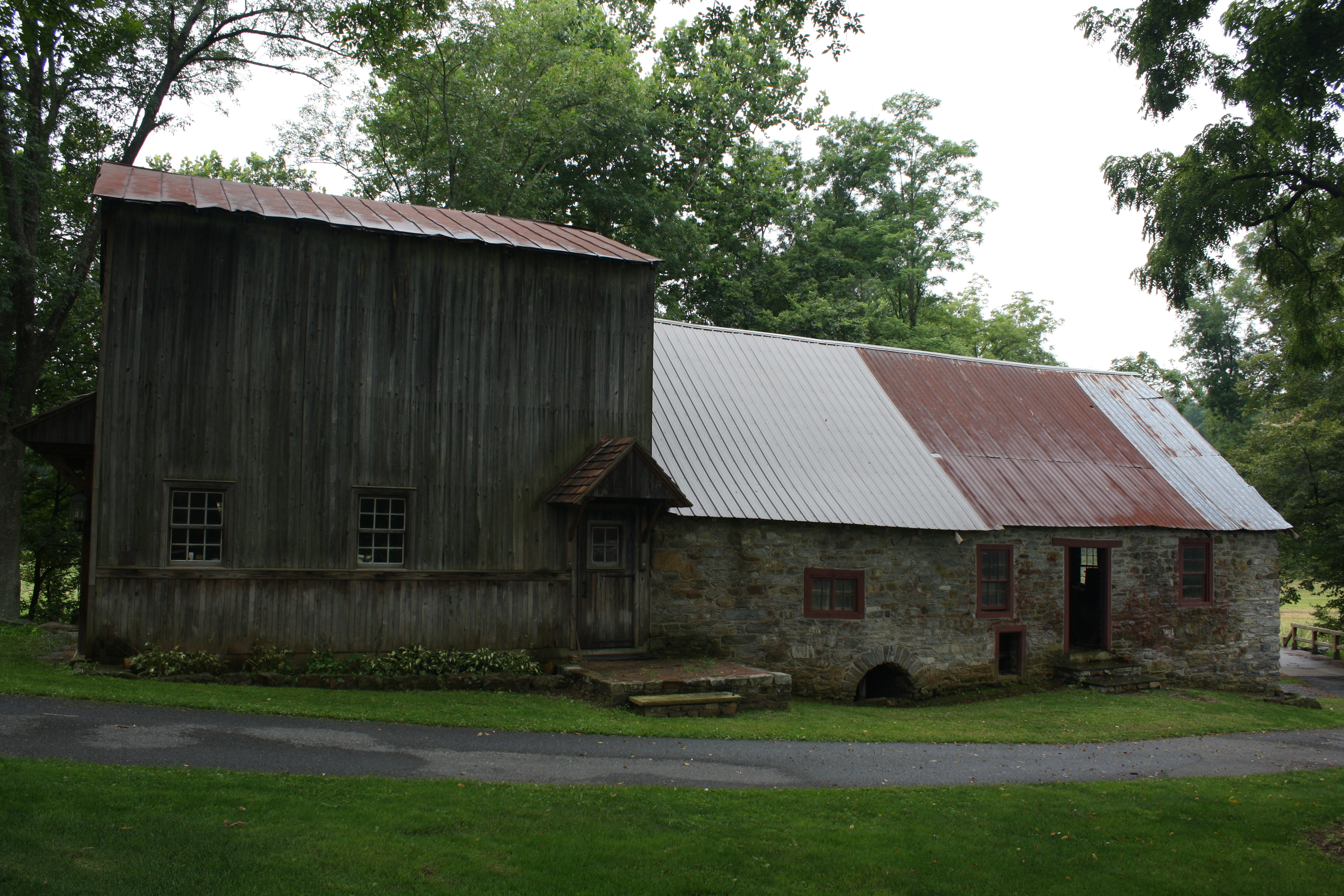

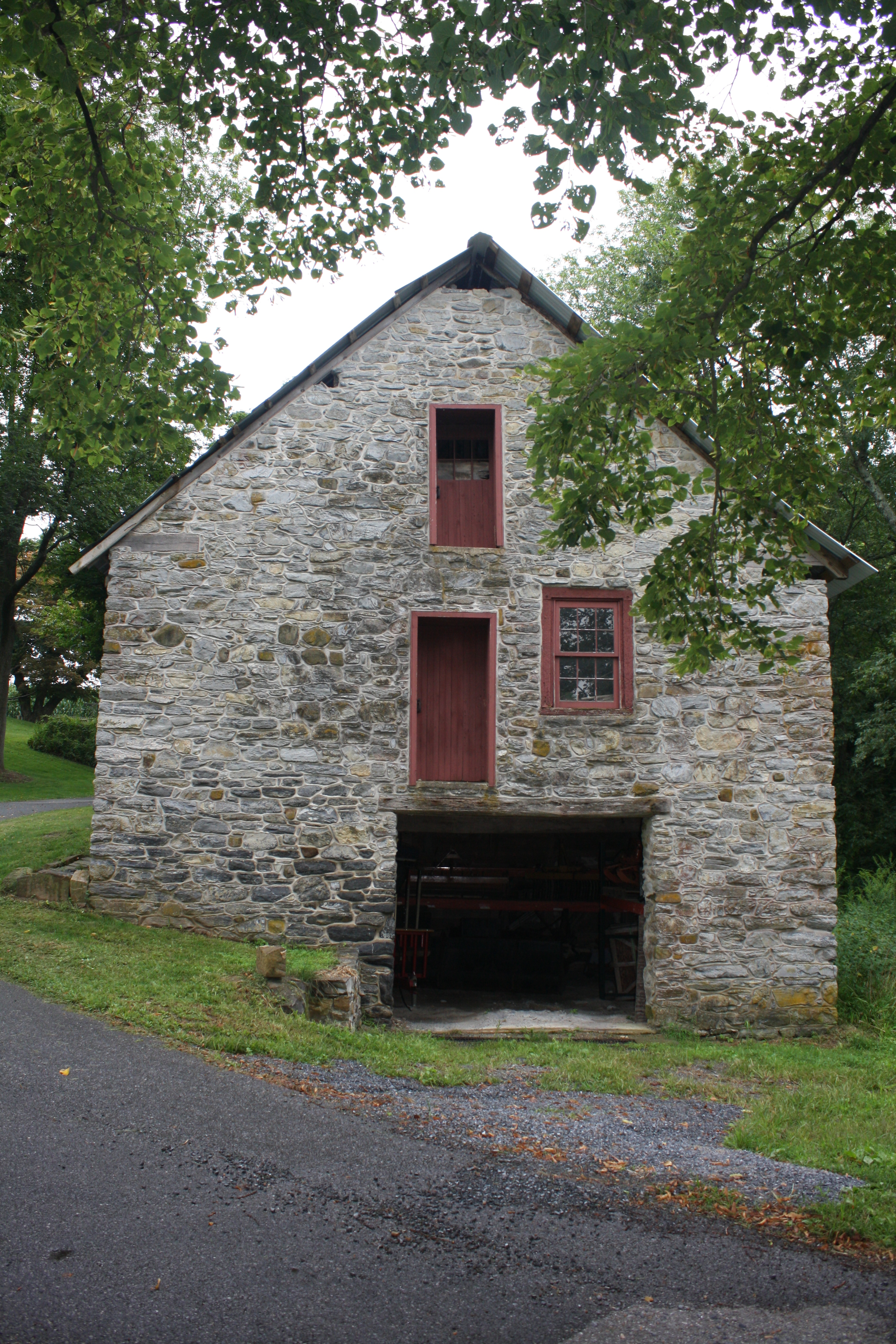

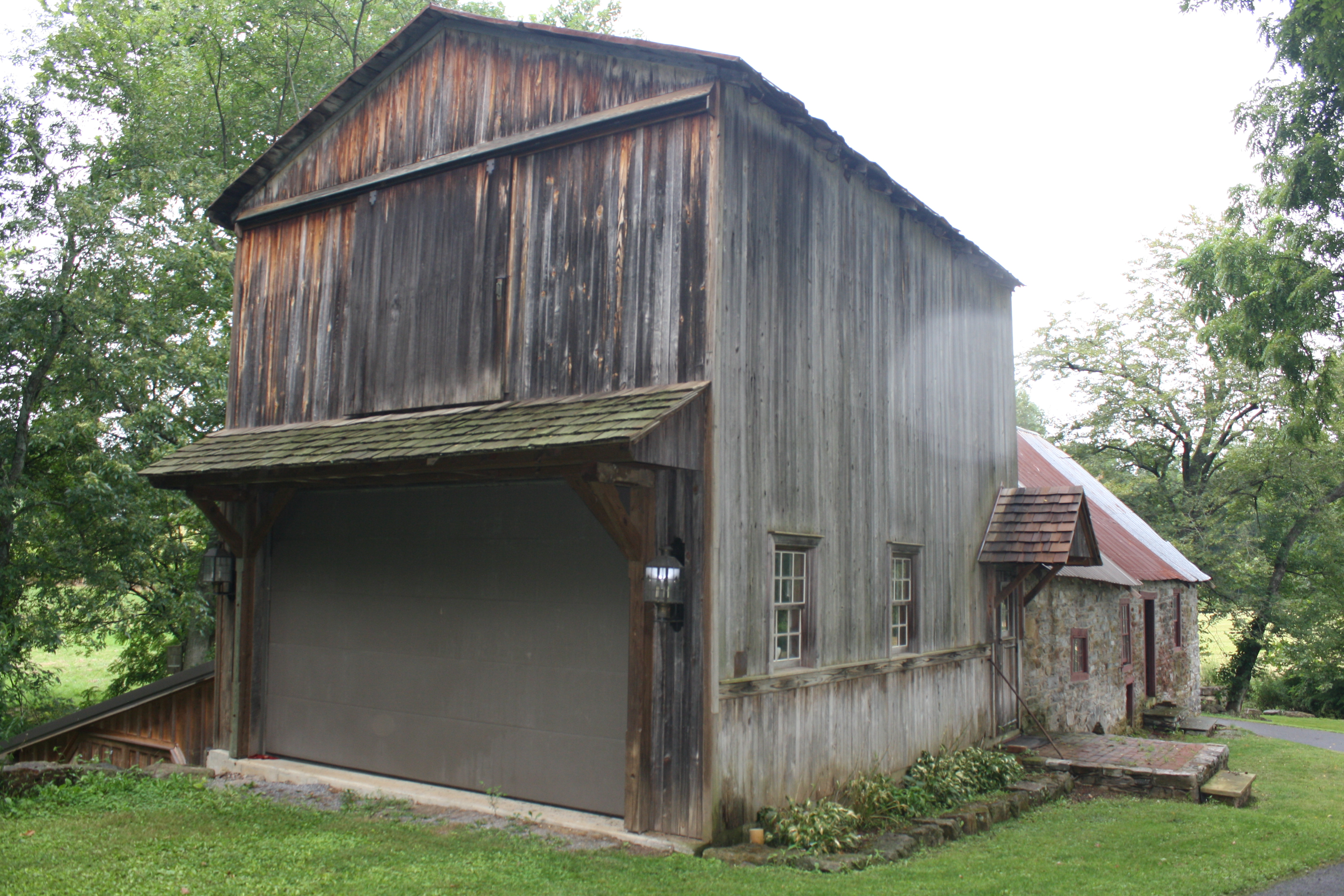

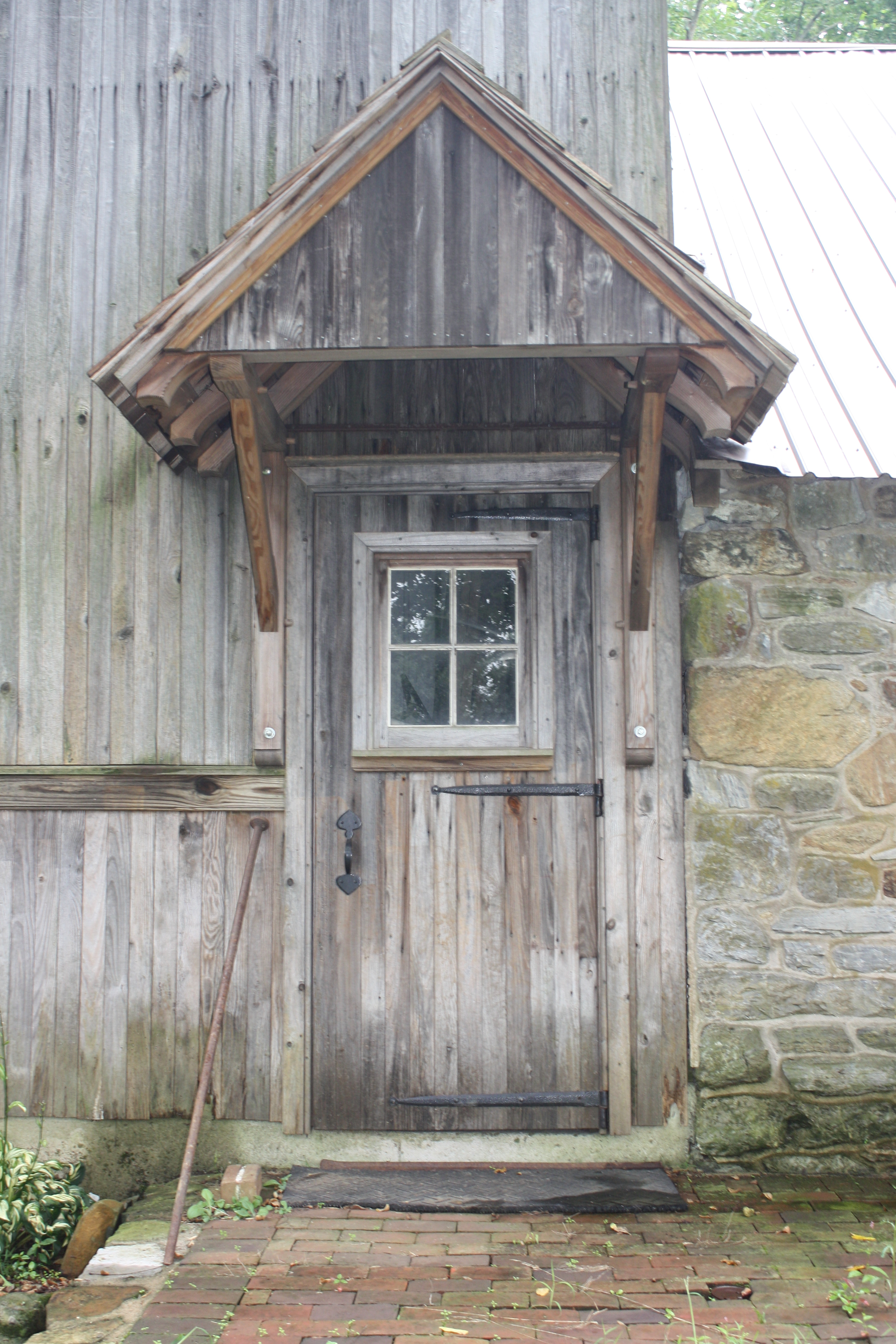
