= Thompson Mill =

- U.S. National Register of Historic Places
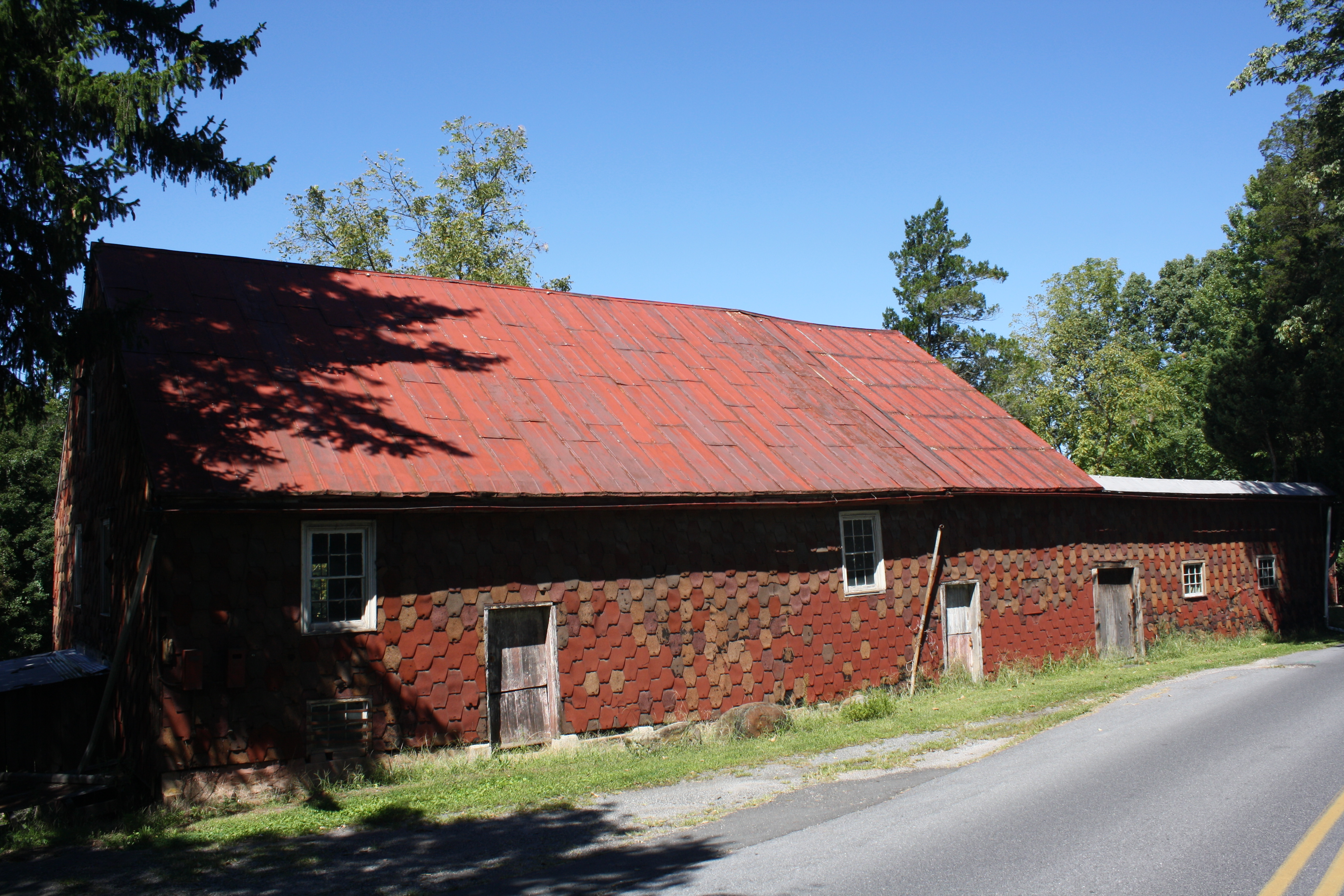
- Thompson gristmill. September 2013.

- Location within Pennsylvania Location within the United States
- Location: Golf Course Road at Seidel Creek, Robeson Township, Pennsylvania
- Coordinates: 40°16′38″N 75°51′48″W
- Area: 6 acres (2.4 ha)
- Built: c. 1816
- MPS: Gristmills in Berks County MPS
- NRHP reference No.: 90001633
- Added to NRHP: November 8, 1990

The Thompson Mill is an historic grist mill that is located near Seidel Creek in Robeson Township, Berks County, Pennsylvania, United States.

It was listed on the National Register of Historic Places in 1990.

== History and architectural features ==
This historic mill was built circa 1816, and is a one-and-one-half-story stone and frame building with a basement and frame extension. The adjacent farmhouse was built circa 1850, and is a two-and-one-half-story, five-bay, stone dwelling. Also located on the property is a contributing stone bake oven (c. 1850) millraces, a pond, and a dam. Built as part of a working farm, the mill ceased operation in 1950.

== Gallery ==
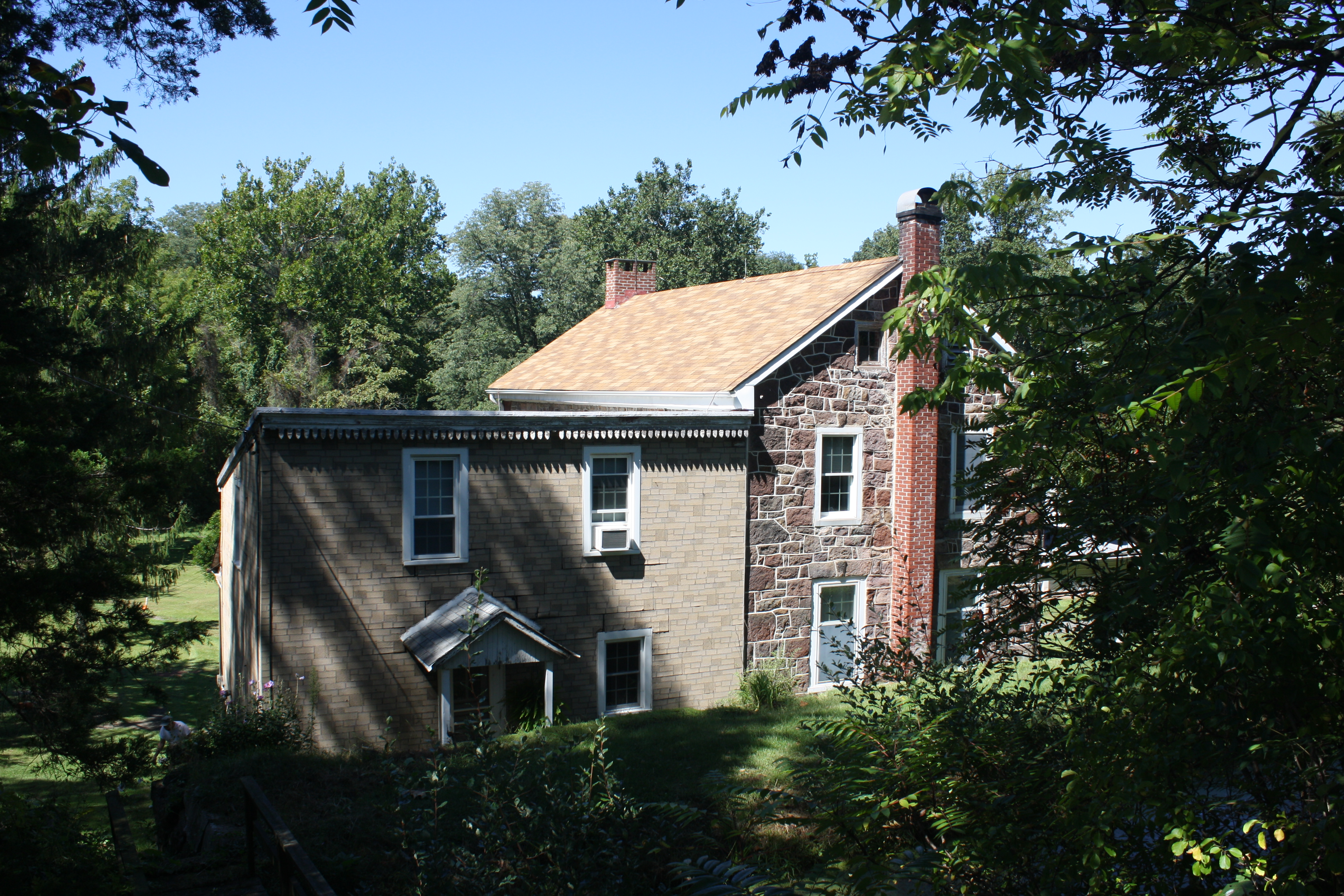
Farmhouse

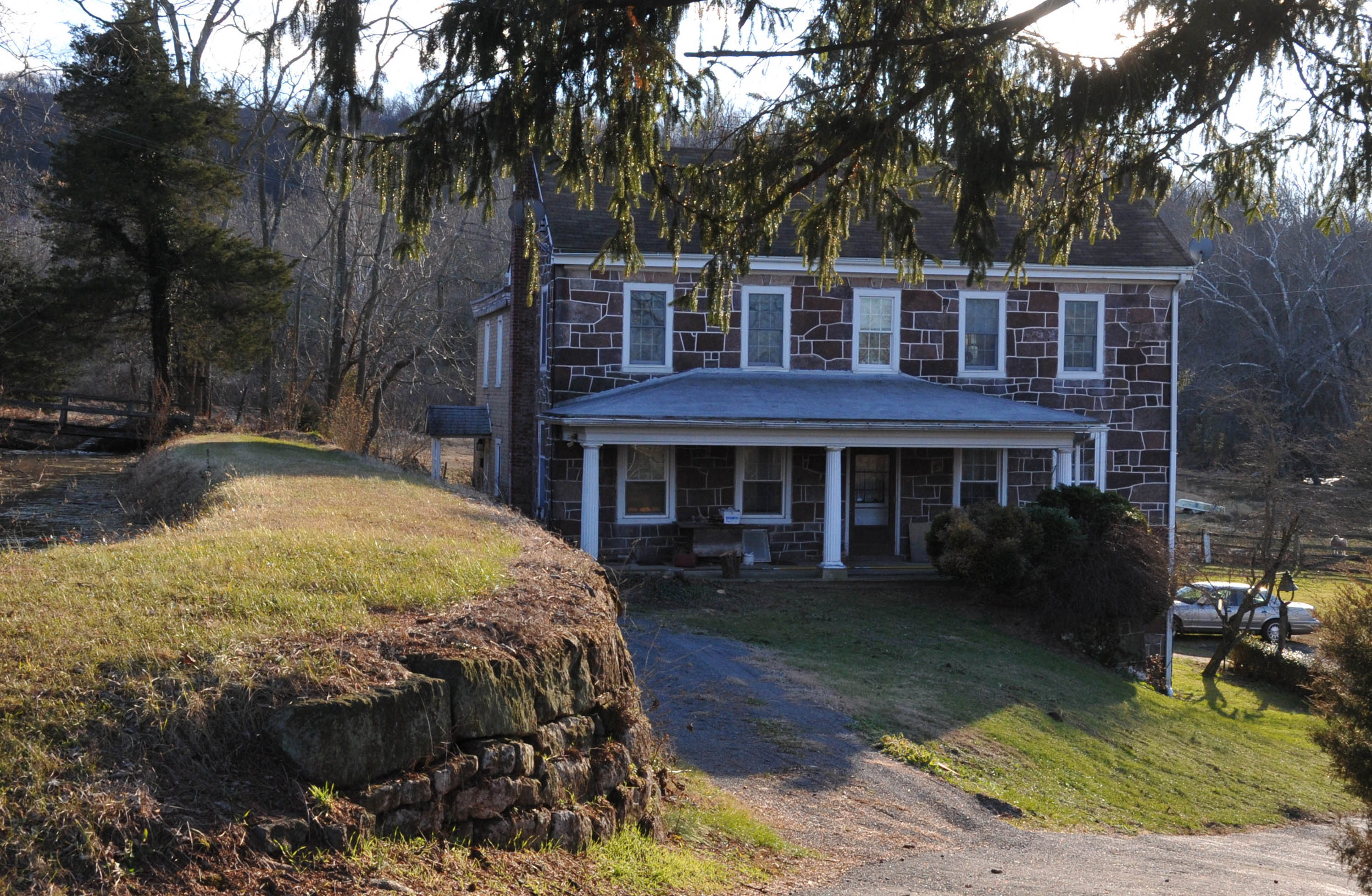
