= Monocacy =

Monocacy (Shawnee: Monnockkeseymay) may refer to the Monocacy River in Maryland, USA.

Monocacy may also refer to:

== Other streams ==
- Little Monocacy River, a tributary of the Potomac River in Maryland
- Monocacy Creek (Lehigh River tributary), a tributary of the Lehigh River in Pennsylvania
- Monocacy Creek (Schuylkill River), a tributary of the Schuylkill River in Pennsylvania

== Ships ==
- USS Monocacy (1864), the first Monocacy, a gunboat launched in, and served until 1903
- USS Monocacy (PG-20), the second Monocacy, commissioned in 1914 and decommissioned in 1939
- USS Genesee (AT-55), originally the civilian tug Monocacy (1905)

== Other ==
- Monocacy Aqueduct, crosses the Monocacy River near its mouth
- Monocacy National Battlefield, memorializing the Battle of Monocacy (1864), fought near the Monocacy River
- Battle of Monocacy, the July 1864 Civil War battle
- Monocacy (MARC station) named for the battlefield site
- Monocacy Station, Pennsylvania, an unincorporated community in Berks County, Pennsylvania
- Monocacy, Maryland, a former town believed to be located in the vicinity of the Monocacy River

== See also ==
- Monocracy
