= Reading Knitting Mills =

- U.S. National Register of Historic Places
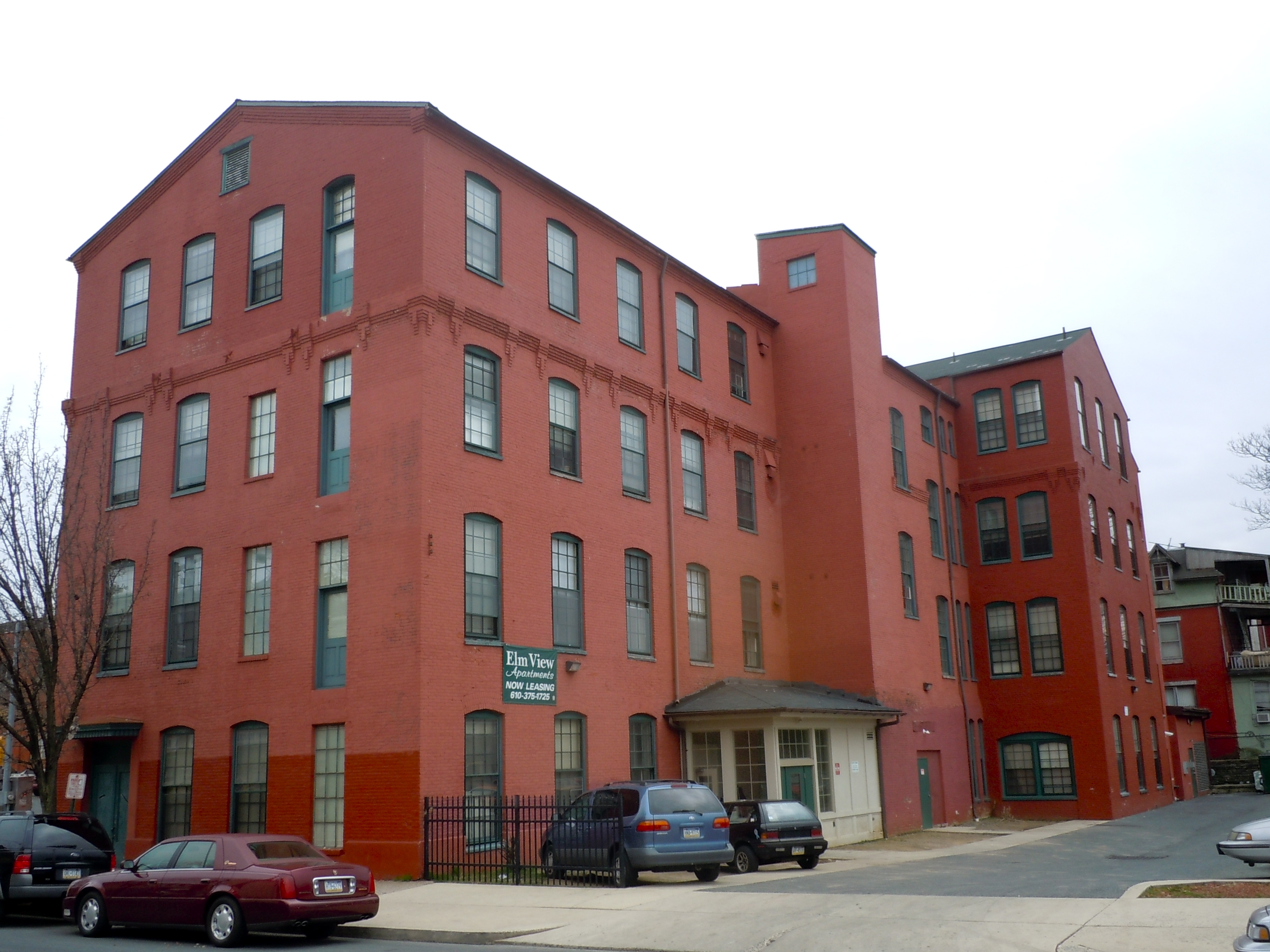
- Reading Knitting Mills, March 2011

- Location within Pennsylvania Location within the United States
- Location: 350 Elm St., Reading, Pennsylvania
- Coordinates: 40°20′23″N 75°55′49″W
- Area: 0.3 acres (0.12 ha)
- Built: 1891, 1898, c. 1920
- Built by: Beard, George W.
- Architect: Levi H. Focht
- Architectural style: Italianate
- NRHP reference No.: 82003762
- Added to NRHP: April 13, 1982

The Reading Knitting Mills is an historic factory building in Reading, Berks County, Pennsylvania, United States.

It was listed on the National Register of Historic Places in 1982.

== History and architectural features ==
Built in 1891, this historic structure was expanded in 1898 and again circa 1920. It is a four-story, fifteen-bay by four-bay, brick building with Italianate-style influences. It has a corbelled brick cornice and slate covered gable roof, and has a brick boiler house annex and one-story addition that were built in 1898. The fourth floor was added to the original three-story building about 1920.
