= Wilhelm Mansion and Carriage House =

Historic house in Pennsylvania, United States

- U.S. National Register of Historic Places
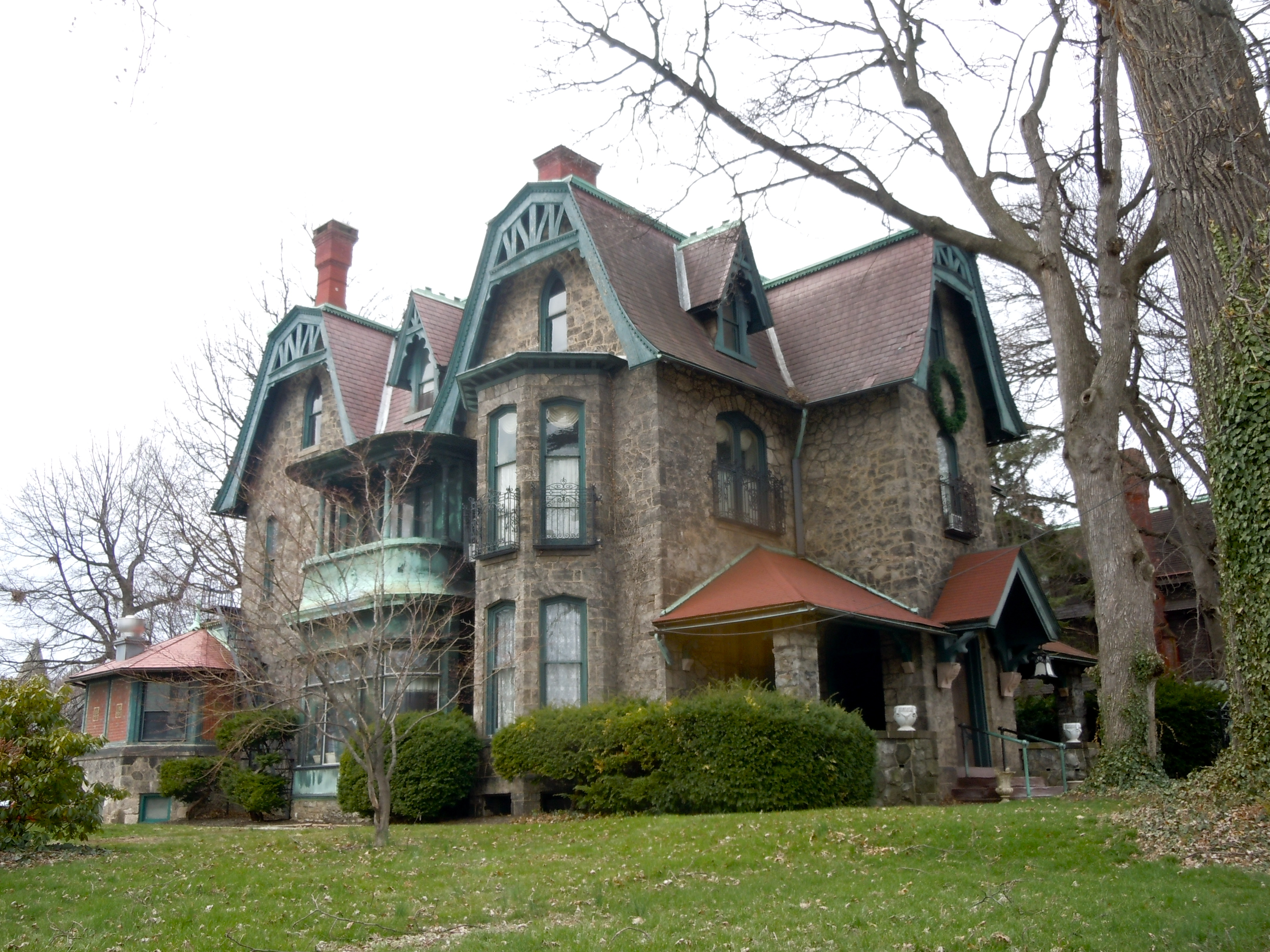
- Wilhelm House, March 2011

- Location within Pennsylvania Location within the United States
- Location: 730 Centre Ave., Reading, Pennsylvania
- Coordinates: 40°20′47″N 75°55′52″W
- Area: 6.3 acres (2.5 ha)
- Built: 1877, 1888, 1890
- Architectural style: Gothic Revival
- NRHP reference No.: 82003763
- Added to NRHP: March 1, 1982

Wilhelm Mansion and Carriage House is a historic mansion and carriage house located at Reading, Berks County, Pennsylvania. The house was built in 1877, and is a three-story, dwelling in the Gothic Revival style. A two-room addition was built in 1888. It is constructed of granite and measures 40 feet wide and 50 feet deep. It features a multi-gabled roof, four corbelled chimneys, and art glass windows. The two-story, granite carriage house was built in 1890.

It was listed on the National Register of Historic Places in 1982.
