= Peter Wanner Mansion =

Historic house in Pennsylvania, United States

- U.S. National Register of Historic Places
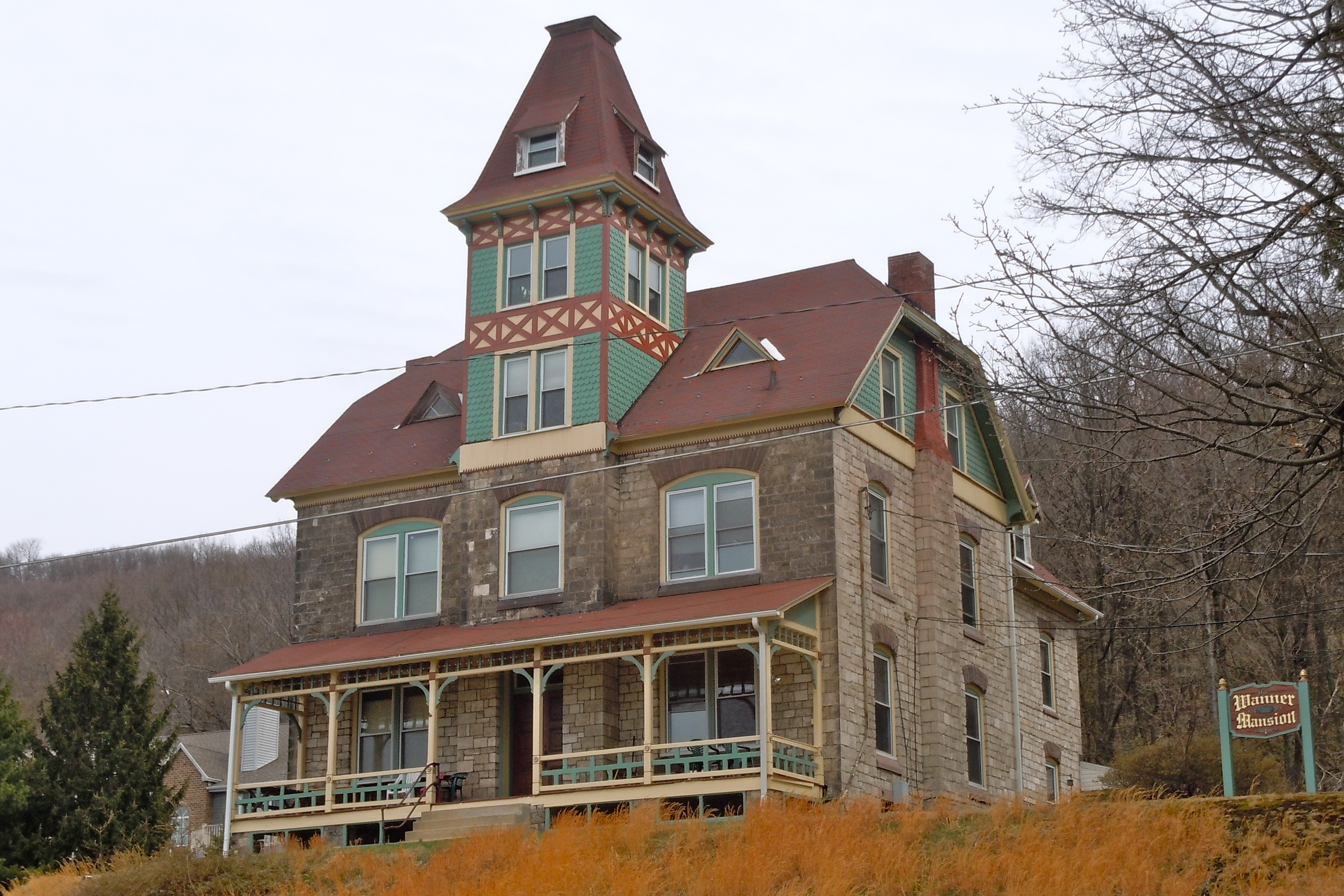
- Wanner Mansion, March 2011

- Location within Pennsylvania Location within the United States
- Location: 1401 Walnut St., Reading, Pennsylvania
- Coordinates: 40°20′18″N 75°54′27″W
- Area: 0.8 acres (0.32 ha)
- Built: 1889
- Architect: Mull, Edward K.
- Architectural style: Late Victorian
- NRHP reference No.: 87001950
- Added to NRHP: November 5, 1987

The Peter Wanner Mansion, also known as the "Mount Penn Home", is an historic mansion in Reading, Berks County, Pennsylvania, United States.

It was listed on the National Register of Historic Places in 1987.

== History and architectural features ==
This historic house is situated at the base of Mount Penn, overlooking the city of Reading. It was built in 1889, and is a "T"-plan, 2 1/2-story, dwelling that was designed in the Late Victorian style. It is constructed of squared, rectangular, limestone and features a stone segmental arched portal, broad front porch, and 4 1/2-story central frame tower. It was converted into apartments during the 1930s or 1940s.
