= Livingood House-Stryker Hospital =

- U.S. National Register of Historic Places
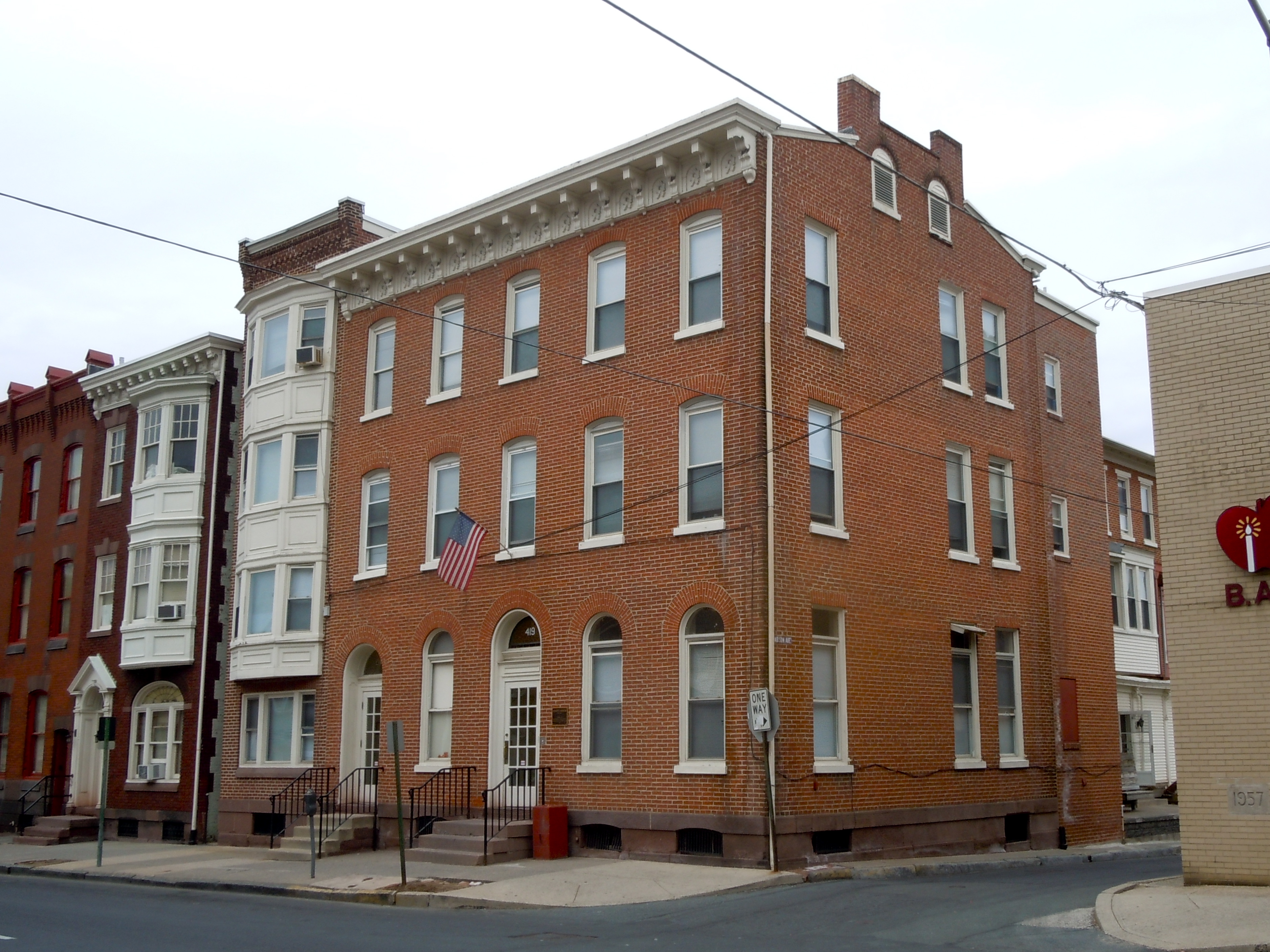
- Livingood House-Stryker Hospital, March 2011

- Location within Pennsylvania Location within the United States
- Location: 417-419 Walnut St., Reading, Pennsylvania
- Coordinates: 40°20′14″N 75°55′45″W
- Area: less than one acre
- Built: 1866-1871, 1908, c. 1921
- Architectural style: Italianate
- NRHP reference No.: 96001195
- Added to NRHP: November 7, 1996

The Livingood House-Stryker Hospital is an historic building in Reading, Berks County, Pennsylvania, United States.

It was listed on the National Register of Historic Places in 1996.

== History and architectural features ==
The Livingood House was built between 1866 and 1871 and is a three-story, five-bay, Italianate-style, brick building that sits on a rubble stone foundation. The original three-story rear ell was extended to ten bays with the conversion of the dwelling to a private hospital in 1908. A long and narrow, four-story, one-bay addition was built circa 1921. This building was converted to apartments in 1933.
