= Cotton and Maple Streets School =

- U.S. National Register of Historic Places
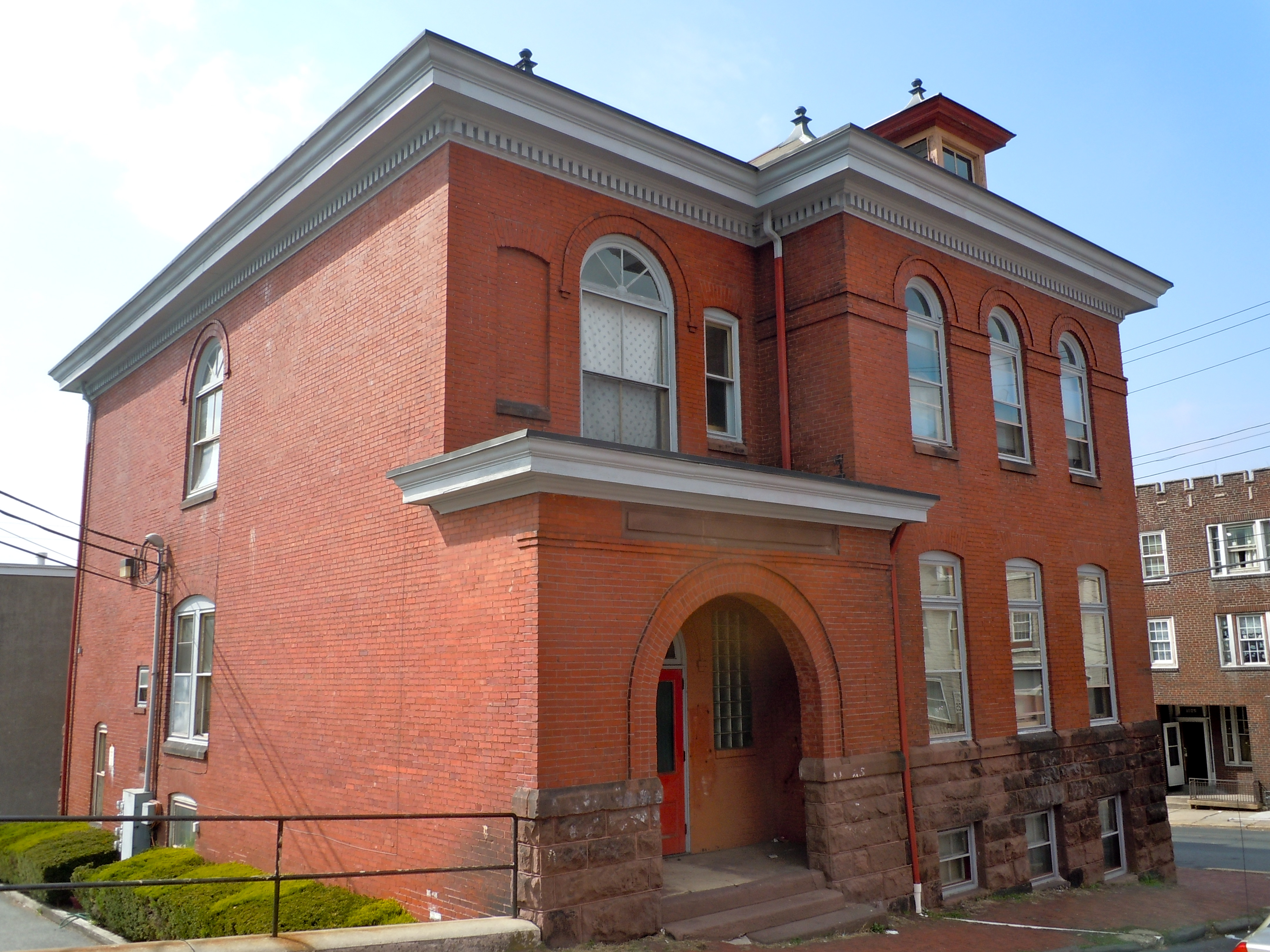
- Cotton and Maple Streets School, April 2011

- Location within Pennsylvania Location within the United States
- Location: Cotton and Maple Sts., Reading, Pennsylvania
- Coordinates: 40°19′42″N 75°55′5″W
- Area: 0.2 acres (0.081 ha)
- Built: 1902–1903
- Built by: George Meinholz
- Architect: Hiram S. Head
- Architectural style: Richardsonian Romanesque
- NRHP reference No.: 86001676
- Added to NRHP: July 17, 1986

Cotton and Maple Streets School is a historic school building located at Reading, Berks County, Pennsylvania. It was built in 1902-1903, and is a two-story, brick and sandstone building in the Richardsonian Romanesque style. It features terra cotta decorative elements and measures 210 feet by 201 feet. It has a rear service wing. The building became a clubhouse in the 1940s.

It was listed on the National Register of Historic Places in 1986.
