= Daniel Berk Log House =

Historic house in Pennsylvania, United States

- U.S. National Register of Historic Places
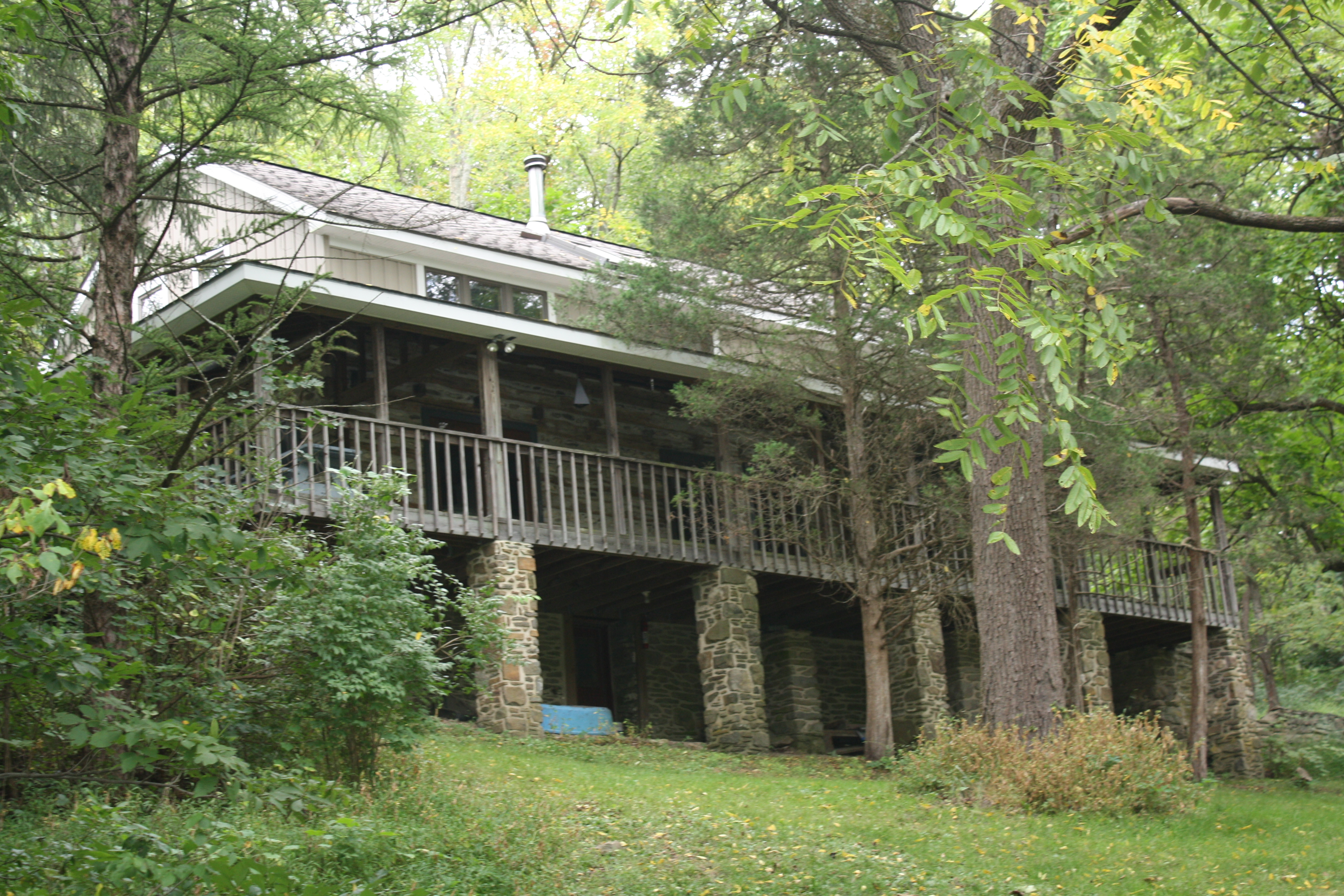
- Daniel Berk Log House. South end wall.

- Location within Pennsylvania Location within the United States
- Location: South of Albany on Maiden Creek, Albany Township, Pennsylvania
- Coordinates: 40°36′16.4″N 75°52′18.8″W
- Area: 0.2 acres (0.081 ha)
- Built: c. 1740
- Built by: Berks, Henry
- NRHP reference No.: 77001122
- Added to NRHP: December 16, 1977

Daniel Berk Log House is a historic log cabin located on Maiden Creek in Albany Township, Berks County, Pennsylvania. It was built in two sections; one about 1740 and the second in the late 1700s. The older section is a 1 1/2-story, rectangular log building measuring 20 feet by 22 feet. It has a gable roof and sits on a stone foundation. The newer section is a 1 1/2-story stone addition measuring 20 feet by 22 feet.

It was listed on the National Register of Historic Places in 1977.
