= Old Main at the Lutheran Home at Topton =

- U.S. National Register of Historic Places
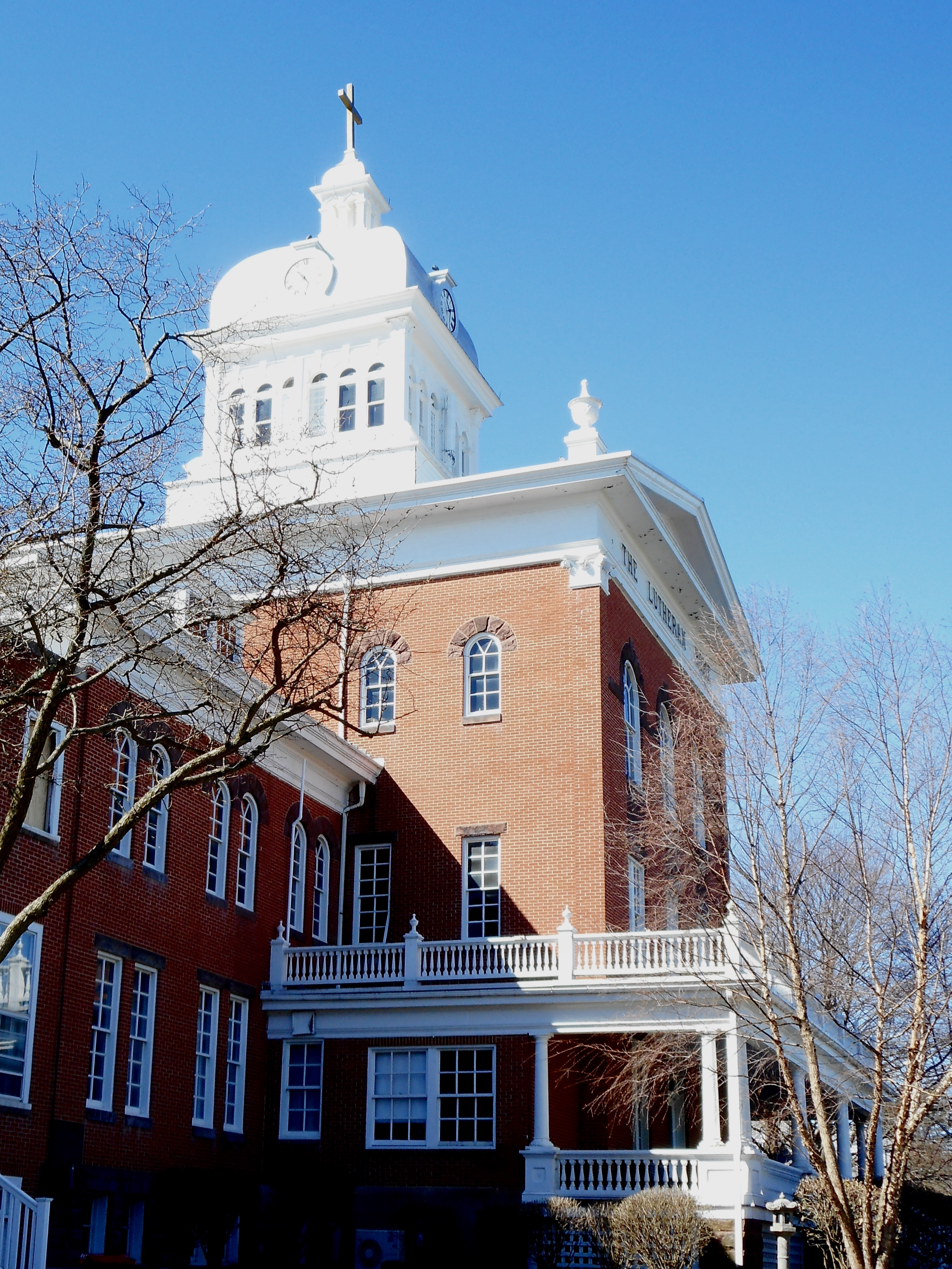

- Location within Pennsylvania Location within the United States
- Location: 1 S. Home Ave. Longswamp Township, Berks County, Pennsylvania
- Coordinates: 40°29′40″N 75°41′56″W
- Area: 20 acres (8.1 ha)
- Built: 1897-1899, 1911
- NRHP reference No.: 14000183
- Added to NRHP: 2015

The Old Main at the Lutheran Home at Topton is the original building of the Lutheran Home that overlooks the borough of Topton in Longswamp Township, Berks County, Pennsylvania.

== History and architectural features ==
This historic building was completed in 1899 and used as an orphanage. It has three, brick stories. Two wings were added in 1911, which originally contained classrooms and dormitories.

During the 1940s, the Lutheran Home began admitting retirees to live in the building as the number of orphans decreased.

It was listed on the National Register of Historic Places in 2015.

The Lutheran Home is now operated by Diakon Lutheran Social Ministries.

== Gallery ==
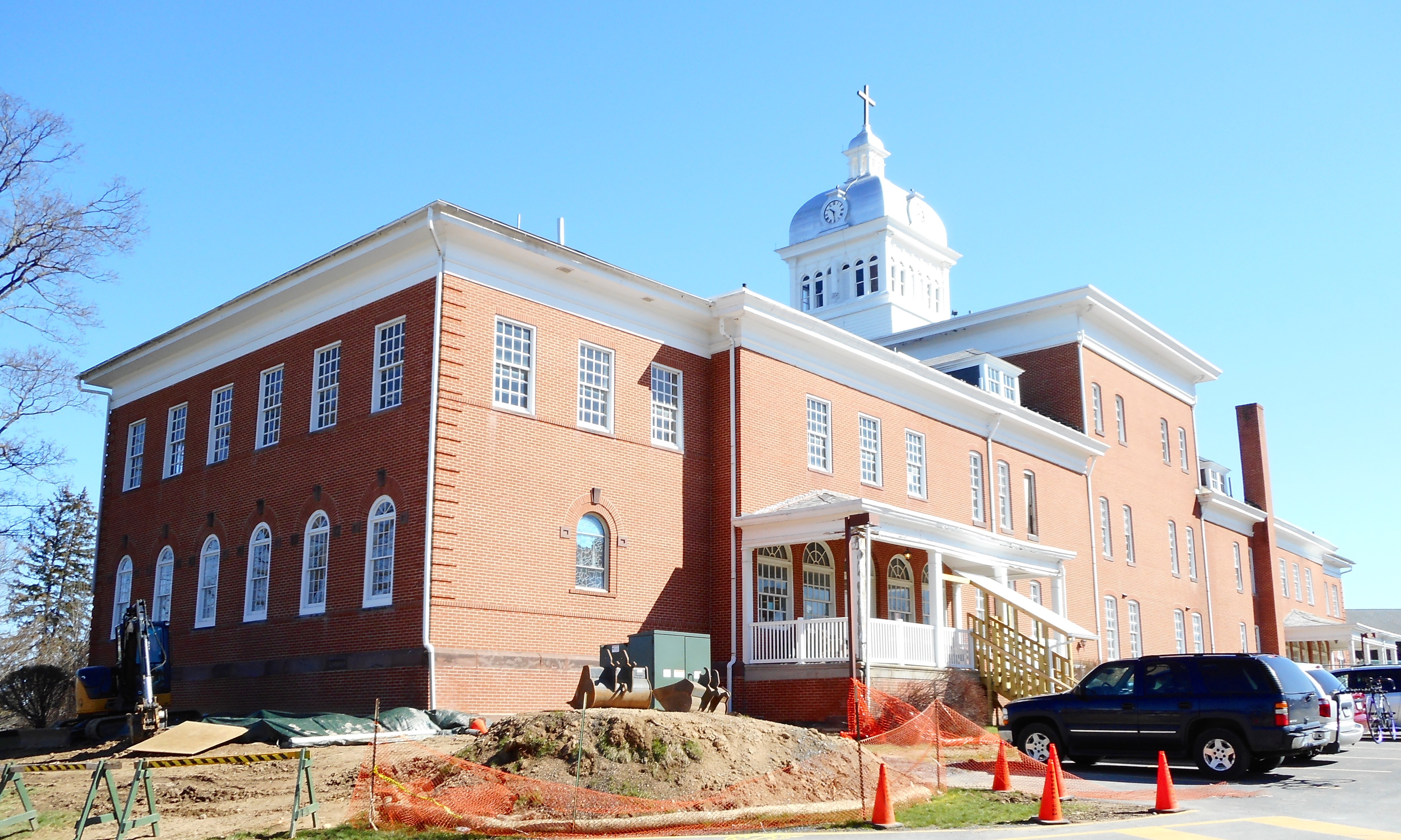
Rear of the main building
