= Log House, Hiester House and Market Annex =

Historic house in Pennsylvania, United States

- Log House, Hiester House, and Market Annex
- U.S. National Register of Historic Places
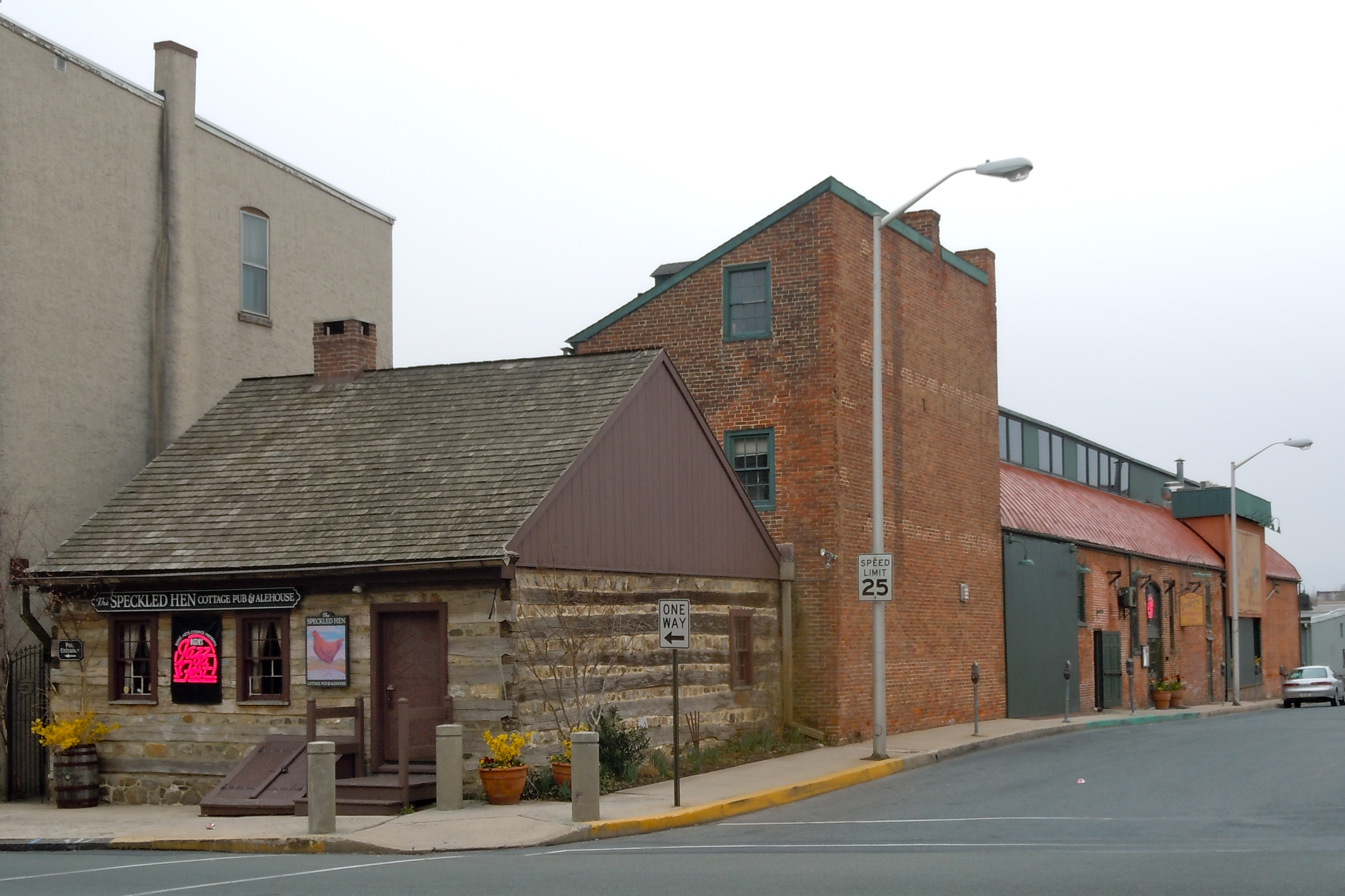
- Speckled Hen, March 2011

- Location within Pennsylvania Location within the United States
- Location: 30 S. 4th St., Reading, Pennsylvania
- Coordinates: 40°20′3″N 75°55′49″W
- Area: less than one acre
- Built: c. 1760, c. 1820, 1895
- NRHP reference No.: 79002169
- Added to NRHP: November 20, 1979

The Log House, Hiester House, and Market Annex is an historic building in Reading, Berks County, Pennsylvania, United States.

It was listed on the National Register of Historic Places in 1979.

== History and architectural features ==
The Log House was built circa 1760, and is a 1 1/2-story, dwelling measuring twenty-five feet by thirty feet. The pine logs are chinked with cut stone and mortar, with notch and saddle corner construction. The John Hiester House was built circa 1820, and is a 2 1/2-story, two-bay brick dwelling measuring seventeen feet by thirty-four feet. It is located to the rear of the Log House; both were used for commercial activities during the nineteenth century. The West Reading Market Annex, which was built in 1895, is located to the rear of the Hiester House. It is a brick market house measuring 165 feet long and thirty feet wide. The complex is the home of The Speckled Hen Cottage Pub and Alehouse.
