= Greisemer's Mill Bridge =

- Griesemer's Mill Bridge
- U.S. National Register of Historic Places
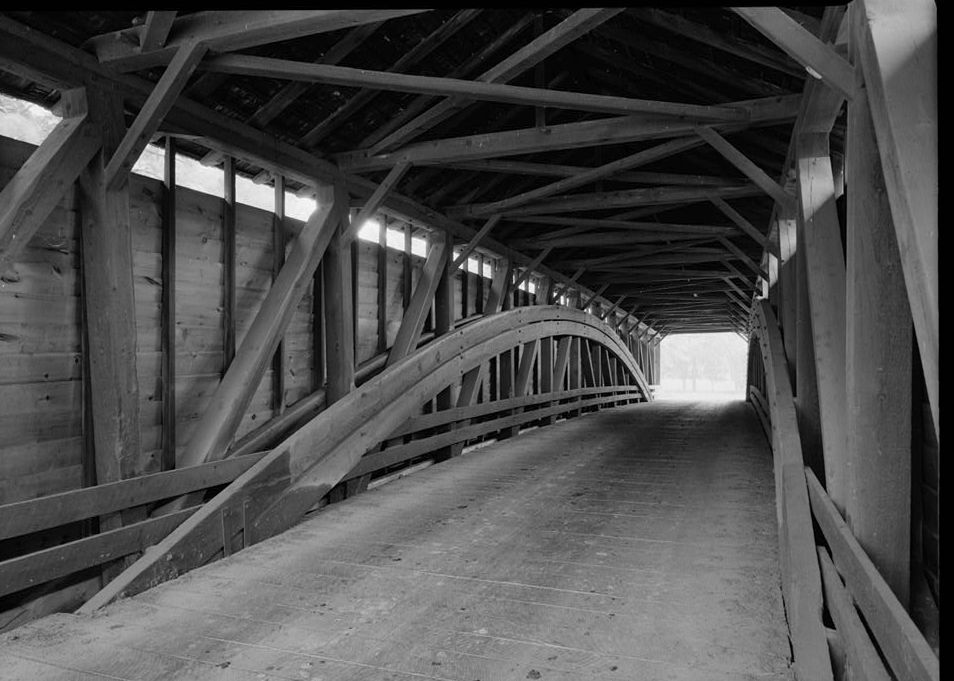
- Griesemer Mill Covered Bridge, August 1958 (HAER Photo)

- Location within Pennsylvania Location within the United States
- Location: Northwest of Boyerstown on Township 579, Oley Township, Pennsylvania
- Coordinates: 40°21′46″N 75°44′18″W
- Area: less than one acre
- MPS: Berks County Covered Bridges TR
- NRHP reference No.: 81000532
- Added to NRHP: February 23, 1981

Griesemer's Mill Bridge is a historic wooden covered bridge located at Oley Township in Berks County, Pennsylvania. It is a 124-foot-long (38 m), Burr Truss bridge, constructed in 1832. It has a gable roof and stone abutments. It crosses the Manatawny Creek. It is one of five covered bridges remaining in Berks County.

It was listed on the National Register of Historic Places in 1981.
