= Brobst Mill =

- U.S. National Register of Historic Places
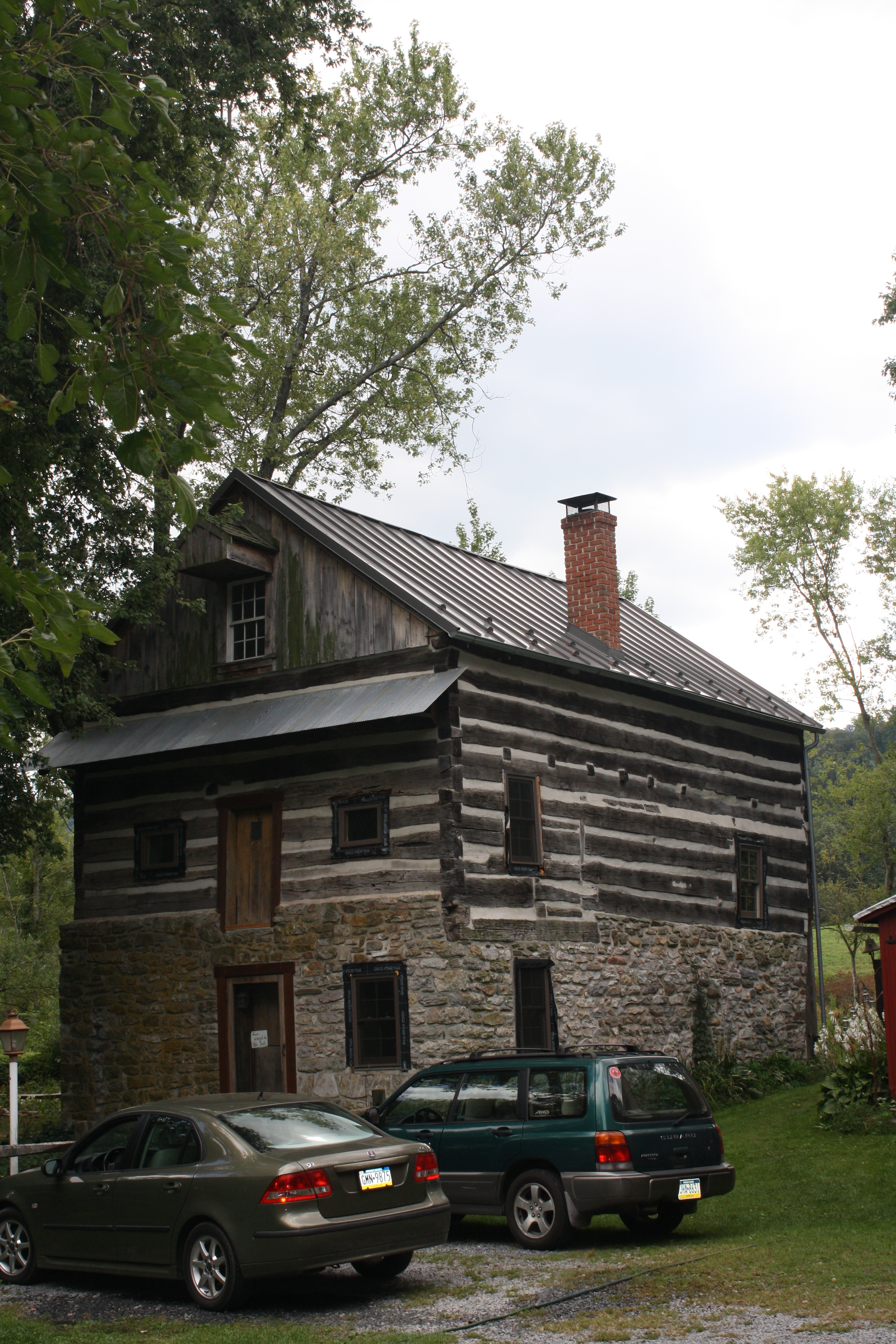
- Brobst Mill, September 2013

- Location within Pennsylvania Location within the United States
- Location: Off Township 814 on Pine Creek, Albany Township, Pennsylvania
- Coordinates: 40°37′23″N 75°53′50″W
- Area: less than one acre
- Built: c. 1780
- MPS: Gristmills in Berks County MPS
- NRHP reference No.: 90001613
- Added to NRHP: November 8, 1990

Brobst Mill is a historic grist mill located in Albany Township, Berks County, Pennsylvania. It was built about 1780, and is a 2 1/2-story, stone and log mill building. Also on the property is the wheel pit area of the raceway. It was built as part of a larger industrial complex known as Union Iron Works. The mill ceased operation in the 1960s.

It was listed on the National Register of Historic Places in 1990.
