= Hendel Brothers, Sons and Company Hat Factory =

- U.S. National Register of Historic Places
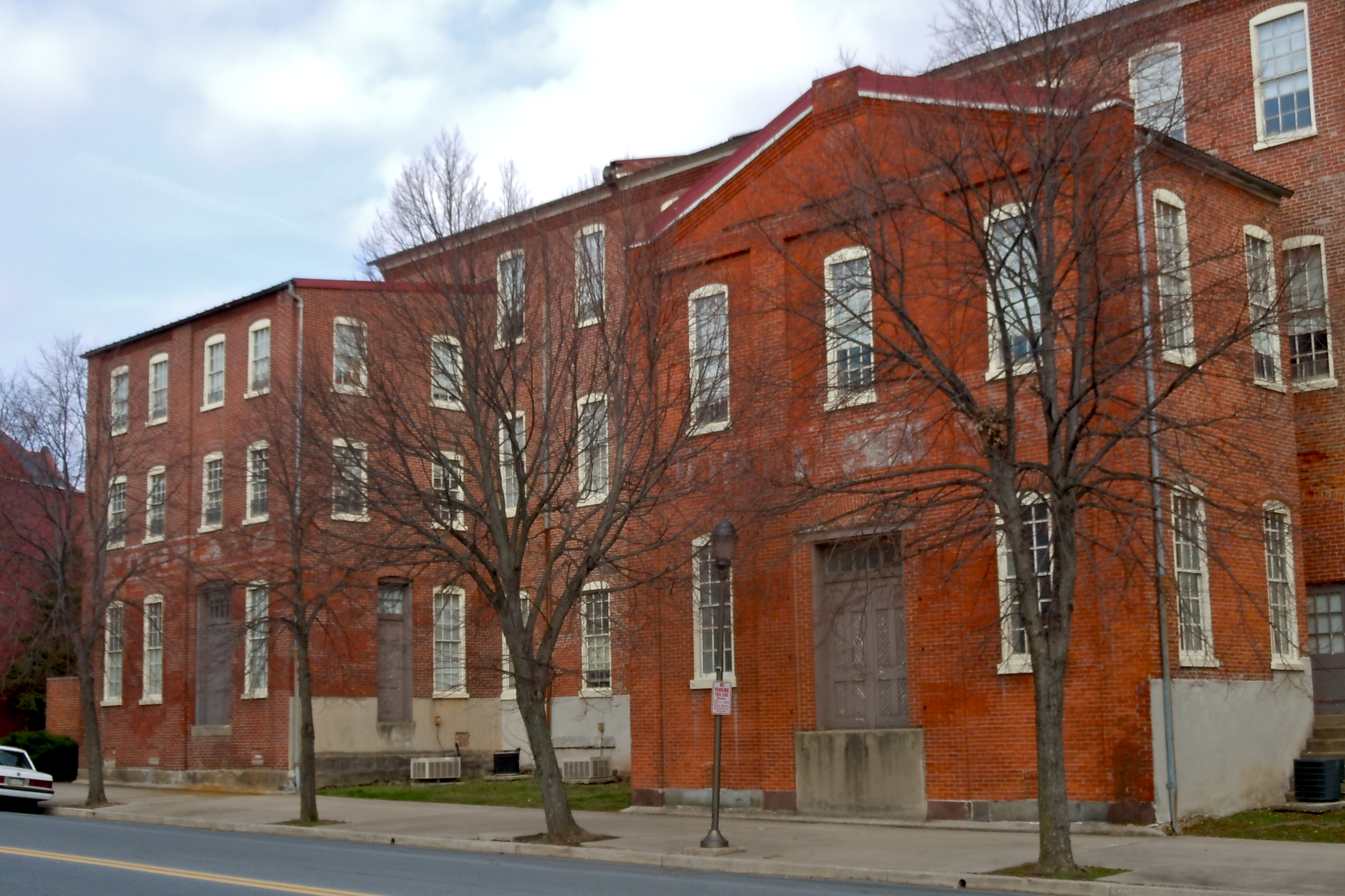
- Hendel Hat Factory, April 2011

- Location within Pennsylvania Location within the United States
- Location: 517–539 S. 5th St., Reading, Pennsylvania
- Coordinates: 40°19′32″N 75°55′35″W
- Area: less than one acre
- Built: c. 1850
- NRHP reference No.: 79002168
- Added to NRHP: November 20, 1979

The Hendel Brothers, Sons and Company Hat Factory, also known as "The Hat Factory," is an historic factory building which is located in Reading, Berks County, Pennsylvania.

It was listed on the National Register of Historic Places in 1979.

== History and architectural features ==
The original section was built as a wool mill circa 1850, and is a three-story, brick building with the central section measuring sixty-two feet by one hundred and thirty feet. It has a three-story south wing, two-story north wing, and small two-story west wing. Made with heavy timber-frame construction, it features large arched double hung windows.

A hat factory operated in the building until about 1930, after which it was used as a warehouse and trucking terminal.
