= Grimshaw Silk Mill =

- U.S. National Register of Historic Places
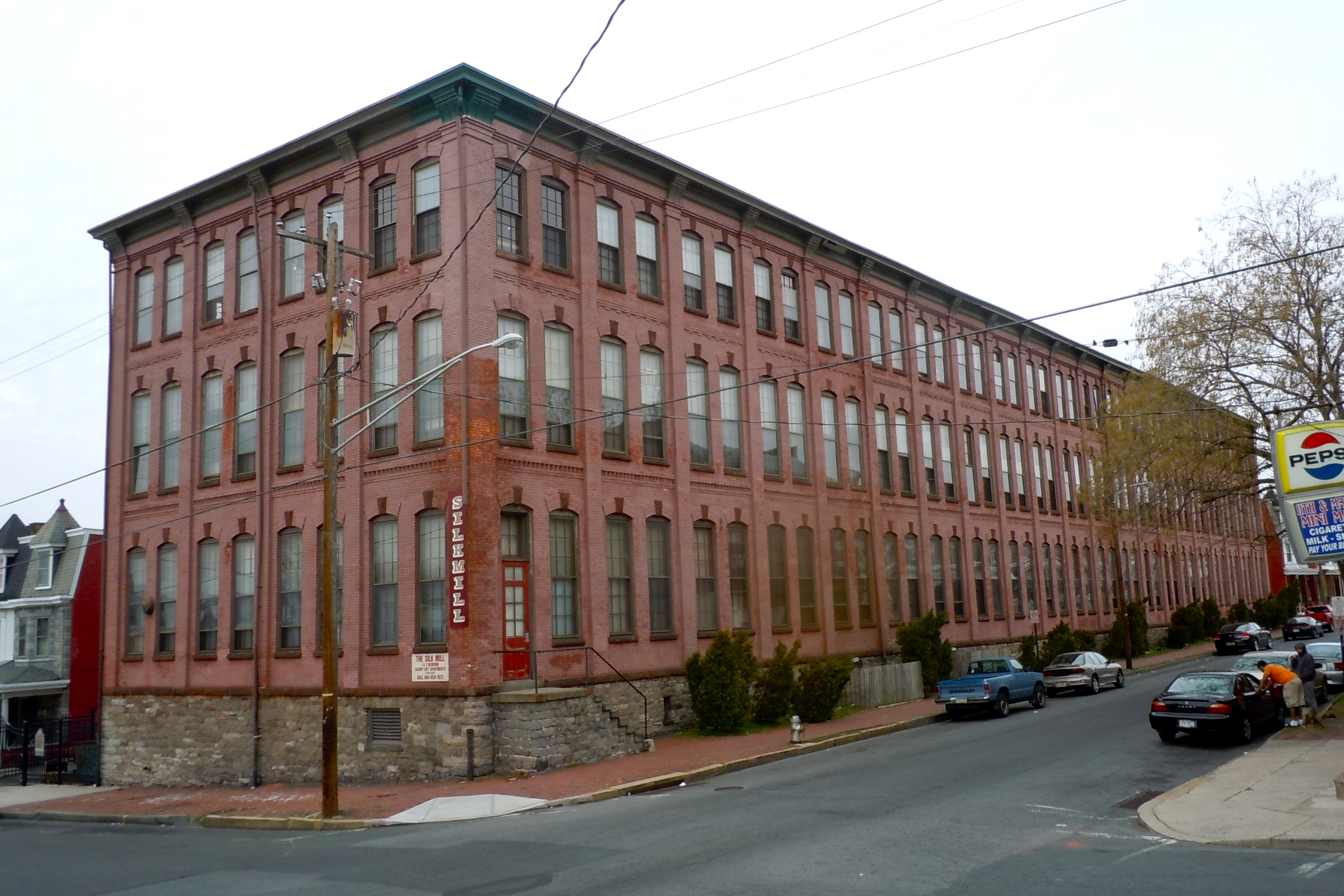
- Grimshaw Silk Mill, March 2011

- Location within Pennsylvania Location within the United States
- Location: 1200 N. 11th St., Reading, Pennsylvania
- Coordinates: 40°21′10″N 75°54′58″W
- Area: 0.5 acres (0.20 ha)
- Built: 1887, 1889
- Built by: Levi H. Focht
- NRHP reference No.: 85000176
- Added to NRHP: January 31, 1985

The Grimshaw Silk Mill, also known as Freeman Shoes, is an historic factory building which is located in Reading, Berks County, Pennsylvania.

It was listed on the National Register of Historic Places in 1985.

== History and architectural features ==
This silk mill was built in 1887 and then rebuilt in 1889, after a tornado destroyed the original building on January 9, 1889, killing nineteen employees and injuring one hundred.

It is a three-story, rectangular, brick building measuring fifty feet by two hundred and fifty feet. A stair tower is topped by a pyramidal roof. It sits on a rubble stone basement and features pilasters, brownstone keystones and a pressed metal cornice.
