= Curtis and Jones Company Shoe Factory =

Historic factory building in Pennsylvania, U.S.

- U.S. National Register of Historic Places
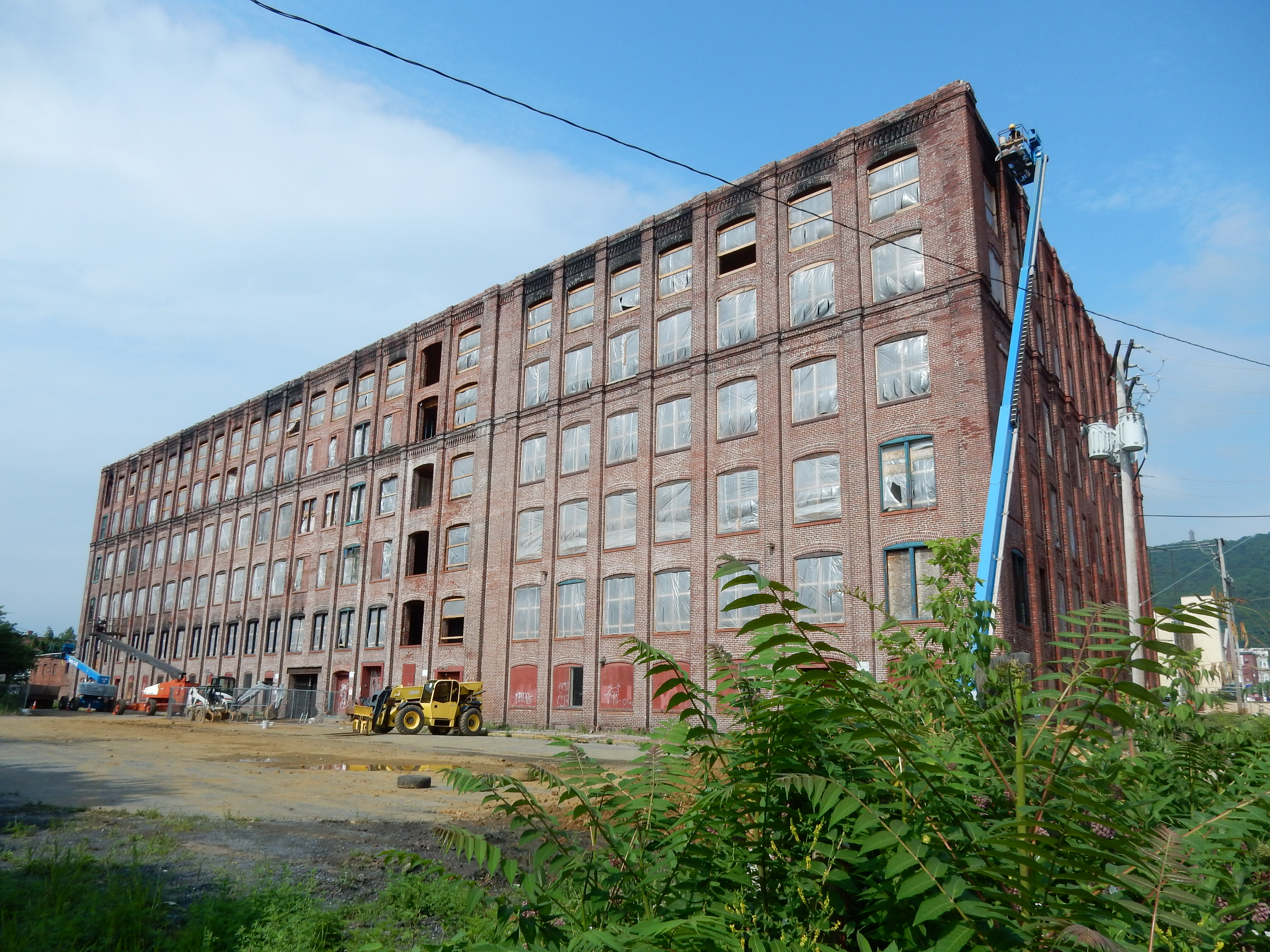
- The building in 2015

- Location within Pennsylvania Location within the United States
- Location: 702 North 8th Street, Reading, Pennsylvania
- Coordinates: 40°20′47″N 75°55′20″W
- Built: 1902
- NRHP reference No.: 14000182
- Added to NRHP: April 28, 2014

The Curtis and Jones Company Shoe Factory was a major shoe manufacturer located in Reading, Pennsylvania that operated from 1902 to 1974.

== History and architectural features ==
The Curtis and Jones Company was founded by Frederick W. Curtis and Frederick S. Jones sometime in the late 1870s or early 1880s and specialized in the manufacture of shoes for infants and children.

The company originally occupied a building on Penn Square in the center of downtown Reading and had moved location three times prior to moving into the Shoe Factory building upon the incorporation of the company. At its peak, the Curtis and Jones Company had over 700 employees and produced 10,000 shoes a day, mainly for infants, children, and women.

After the Curtis and Jones Company ceased operations in the 1974, the building was used as part of the Reading Outlet Center until it fell into disuse.

The building was renovated in the 2016 by Shuman Development Group and is now used to house the Big Mill Apartments, which contains 69 apartments and approximately 42,000 square feet of commercial space.

The building was listed on the National Register of Historic Places on April 28, 2014.
