= Bethel AME Church (Reading, Pennsylvania) =

Historic church in Pennsylvania, United States

- U.S. National Register of Historic Places
- Pennsylvania state historical marker
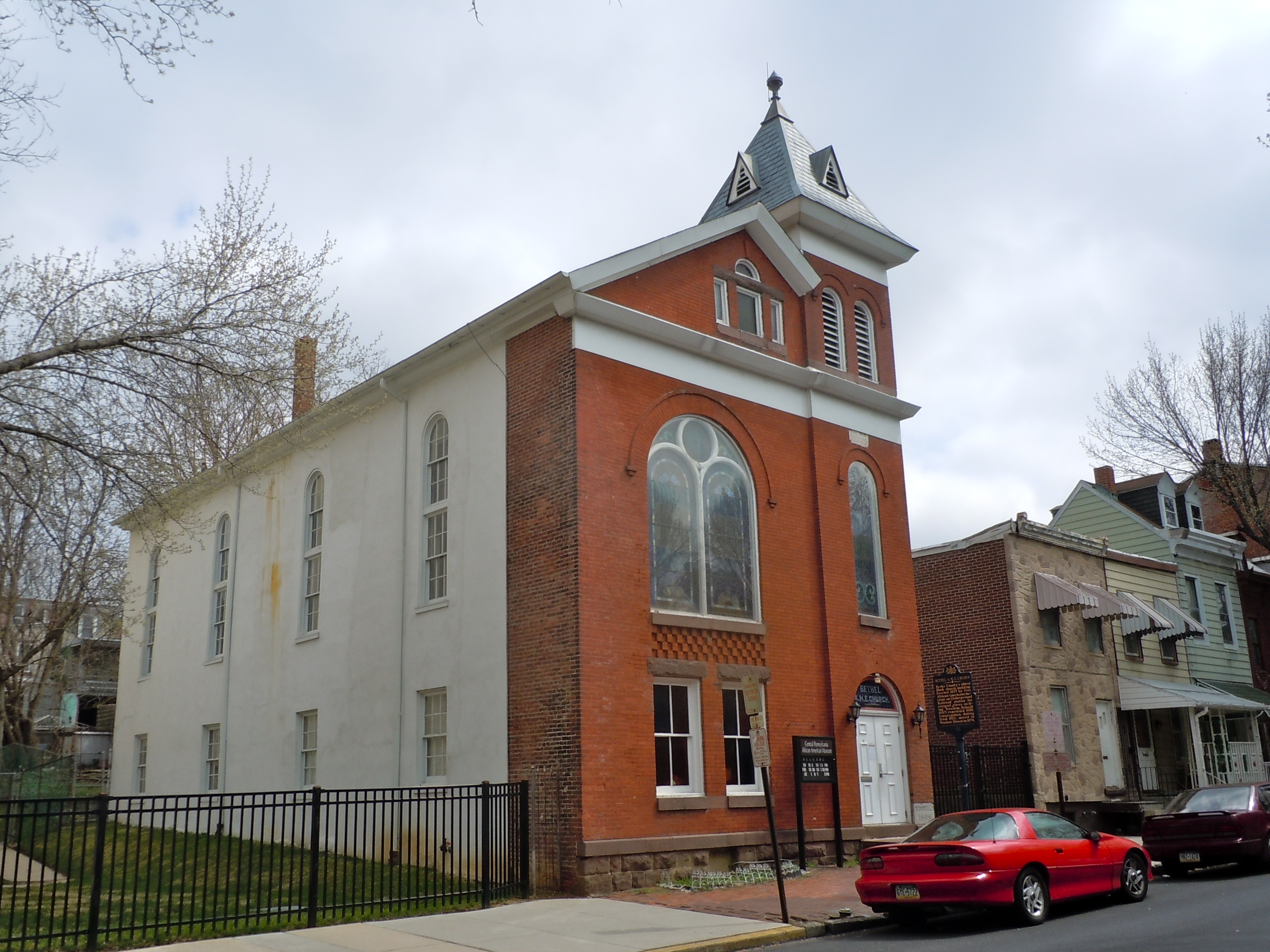
- Bethel AME Church, April 2011

- Location within Pennsylvania Location within the United States
- Location: 119 N. 10th St, Reading, Pennsylvania
- Coordinates: 40°20′15″N 75°55′5″W
- Area: 9 acres (3.6 ha)
- Built: 1837, c. 1867-1869, 1889
- Architect: Mulray, Samuel
- NRHP reference No.: 79002167

Significant dates
- Added to NRHP: September 7, 1979
- Designated PHMC: May 11, 1996

Bethel AME Church, now known as the Central Pennsylvania African American Museum, is a historic African Methodist Episcopal church built in 1837 at 119 North 10th Street in Reading, Berks County, Pennsylvania. It has been listed on the National Register of Historic Places since 1979.

== Church history ==
It was originally built in 1837, and is a 2½-storey brick and stucco building with a gable roof. It was rebuilt about 1867–1869, and remodeled in 1889. It features a three-storey brick tower with a pyramidal roof topped by a finial. The church is known to have housed fugitive slaves and the congregation was active in the Underground Railroad. The church is now home to a museum dedicated to the history of African Americans in Central Pennsylvania.

The only AME church in Berks County to have been built using private resources from its congregation, Bethel AME was founded by George Dillen, Samuel Murray, Isaac Parker, and Jacob Ross. Of those four, Murray was the one most involved with the building's construction. Closely aligned with Philadelphia's Mother Bethel AME Church, "Men preached from the pulpits but the ladies were responsible for organizing benevolent societies and mission circles, teaching classes in the large Sunday Schools attached to both congregations, as well as singing in the choir and providing a musical accompaniment for the Sunday services," according to historian Barbara Goda.

== Underground Railroad ==
Among the earliest abolitionists in Berks County were the owners of Fleetwood's Kirbyville Inn, Robeson Township's Joanna Furnace, Reading Furnace and Scarlett's Mill, as well as members of religious institutions throughout the region, who provided safe havens for the men, women and children who were escaping from slavery before and during the American Civil War. The Bethel A.M.E. Church and Washington Presbyterian Church were two of the institutions which served as way stations along the Underground Railroad.

The most famous slavery case to take place in Berks County, according to historian Barbara Goda, occurred in February 1840 when a group of slave catchers traveled to the county from Maryland, and began "wandering about town for several days and examining all of the African Americans they could find." Encountering a man they called "James Turner," they "locked him up as a fugitive," a shocking act to many across Pennsylvania because this was "the first arrest of this kind in the memory of local residents." In response, a trial was held during which one of the church's founders, Jacob Ross, informed the judicial officer overseeing the case, Judge Banks, that the slave catchers had, in reality, imprisoned a free man — Harry Jones, a member of the Bethel A.M.E. congregation who had been living in Reading, Pennsylvania for roughly six years, and who had just recently married his wife during ceremonies at Bethel. "Judge Banks, in a lengthy decision, explained that the slavery law of Maryland had not been offered into evidence, and he had no judicial knowledge of such legislation: 'Therefore there could be no legal proof that Turner or Jones owed service or labor to Cooley' (his alleged Maryland owner)," and Jones was freed. Reading, was also home to a local Van Leer noted in the anti-slavery movement, owning a nearby cabin on a railroad station and setting up housing for newly freed slaves.

== See also ==
- List of Underground Railroad sites
