= Seidel Creek =

Stream in Berks County, Pennsylvania, U.S.

Coordinates: 40°17′17″N 75°51′49″W

Seidel Creek is a stream in Berks County, Pennsylvania, in the United States.

Seidel Creek was named Jonathan Seidel, the operator of a local forge.

== See also ==
- List of rivers of Pennsylvania
