= Monocacy Creek (Schuylkill River tributary) =

Coordinates: 40°15′35″N 75°45′54″W

Monocacy Creek is a 13.0-mile-long (20.9 km) tributary of the Schuylkill River in Berks County, Pennsylvania, in the United States. Monocacy Creek joins the Schuylkill at Monocacy Station.

Monocacy is a name derived from a Native American language purported to mean "stream with large beds".

== See also ==
- List of rivers of Pennsylvania
