= Heidelberg Township, Pennsylvania =

Heidelberg Township is the name of some places in the U.S. state of Pennsylvania:

- Heidelberg Township, Berks County, Pennsylvania
- Heidelberg Township, Lebanon County, Pennsylvania
- Heidelberg Township, Lehigh County, Pennsylvania
- Heidelberg Township, York County, Pennsylvania

== See also ==
- Lower Heidelberg Township, Pennsylvania
- North Heidelberg Township, Pennsylvania
- South Heidelberg Township, Pennsylvania
