= State Hill, Pennsylvania =

Unincorporated community in Pennsylvania, US

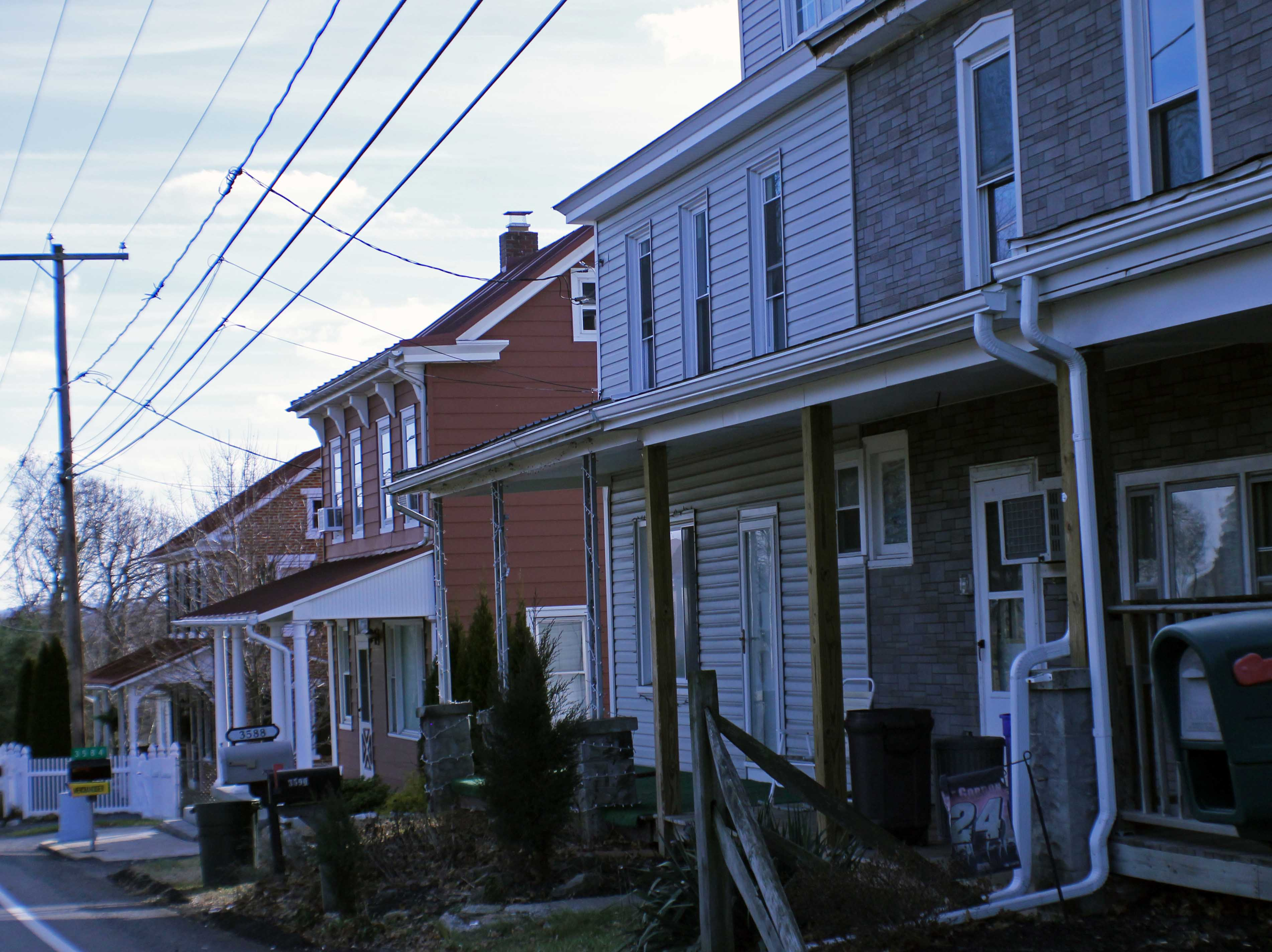
- A view of homes in State Hill

- Location in Pennsylvania and the United States State; Hill (the United States)
- Coordinates: 40°21′45″N 76°01′50″W
- Country: United States
- State: Pennsylvania
- County: Berks
- Township: Lower Heidelberg
- Time zone: UTC-5 (EST)
  - Summer (DST): UTC-4 (EDT)
- Zip Code: 19608

State Hill is an unincorporated community in Lower Heidelberg Township, Berks County, Pennsylvania, United States.

== History ==
The area around present-day State Hill was historically associated with a roadway known as Old Dry Road, a name that survives in the nearby Old Dry Road Farm, which is listed on the National Register of Historic Places. State Hill developed during the mid-nineteenth century near the intersection of present-day State Hill Road and Brownsville Road.

A tavern operated in State Hill by the late nineteenth century. The State Hill Beer Garden, originally constructed around 1876 as a stagecoach stop, became a local landmark and remained in operation until its demolition in 1987.

State Hill is located southeast of Blue Marsh Lake, a reservoir constructed by the U.S. Army Corps of Engineers between 1974 and 1979.

The village is also home to a now-defunct elementary school, the Lower Heidelberg Consolidated School, which operated from 1931 to 2006. It is served by the Wilson School District.

State Hill is home to several businesses and public facilities, including Berks Western Telecom, Blue Marsh Taxidermy, a station of the Western Berks Fire Department, and the Lower Heidelberg Township municipal and police complex.
