= Tulpehocken Creek =

Tulpehocken Creek may refer to:

- Tulpehocken Creek (New Jersey), a tributary of the Wading River in New Jersey
- Tulpehocken Creek (Pennsylvania), a tributary of the Schuylkill River in Pennsylvania
- Tulpehocken Creek Historic District, a national historic district in Berks County, Pennsylvania
