= Pleasant Valley, Berks County, Pennsylvania =

Unincorporated community in Pennsylvania, U.S.

Pleasant Valley was an unincorporated community in western Berks County, Pennsylvania, that was flooded to form Blue Marsh Lake. It was in southern Penn Township.
