= Brownsville, Berks County, Pennsylvania =

Unincorporated community in Pennsylvania, US

Brownsville, Pennsylvania
- Unincorporated community
- Location within Pennsylvania Location within the United States
- Coordinates: 40°22′01″N 76°04′34″W
- Country: United States
- State: Pennsylvania
- County: Berks
- Township: Lower Heidelberg
- Time zone: UTC-5 (Eastern (EST))
  - Summer (DST): UTC-4 (EDT)
- ZIP code: 19565
- Area codes: 610 & 484
- GNIS feature ID: 1170417

Brownsville is an unincorporated community located in western Lower Heidelberg Township, Berks County, Pennsylvania, United States. It is located at the intersection of Brownsville and Heffner Roads. A very small portion of the village extends into North Heidelberg Township.

The Brownsville Road Bridge, which spans the Spring Creek between Lower and North Heidelberg Townships, was constructed in 1962. In July 2010, PennDOT closed the bridge for repairs, and detoured traffic to US Route 422 near Robesonia. PennDOT also replaced the roadsigns on the bridge with new ones. The construction was completed in November 2010, and the bridge was re-opened.
