= Blue Marsh Ski Resort =

Ski resort in Pennsylvania, United States

Blue Marsh
- Interactive map of Blue Marsh
- Location: North Heidelberg Township, Berks County, near Bernville, Pennsylvania, United States
- Nearest city: Reading, Pennsylvania
- Coordinates: 40°25′19.2″N 76°6′46.8″W
- Vertical: 300 feet (91 m)
- Top elevation: 580 feet (180 m)
- Base elevation: 280 feet (85 m)
- Skiable area: 30 acres (120,000 m^{2})
- Trails: 10 total

Blue Marsh Ski Resort (formerly named Mt. Heidelberg) was a small ski resort and winter sports complex that was located just outside Bernville, 10 miles (16 km) north of Reading, Pennsylvania. The area shut down operations in 2005.

Blue Marsh offered skiing, snowboarding, and snow tubing with seven lifts and tows, including a triple, a double, a T-Bar, and four handle tows. The area included a Half Pipe and All Terrain Park, the Big Tube Park, the Kinder Tube Park, and the Wolverine Raft Park. Night skiing was offered every day except Sunday. Blue Marsh had a vertical of 315 feet (96 m) and about a dozen trails, the longest being 2,600 feet (790 m) long. Blue Marsh marketed itself as being a great place to learn how to ski or snowboard, with reasonable lift ticket prices. In 2003, Blue Marsh offered an all-day (9 a.m. to 10 p.m.) weekday lift ticket for $25.

The owners of Blue Marsh ceased its operation at the conclusion of the 2005 ski season. They sold the mountain to developers who hoped to develop the land and build homes. On October 29, 2005, Blue Marsh held a public auction, selling ski equipment including Pisten Bully Snow Cats, T-Bars, snow tubes, snowmobiles, lighting equipment, rental equipment, and china and glassware.

The resort is now reverting to nature, with little remnants left. All lifts and buildings were demolished with the exception of the former T-Bar Lift building at the top of the mountain and a few utility sheds located at the bottom. No homes have been built on the land yet, though plans still exist despite concerns of traffic volume on local roads and a significant change to the landscape.
