= Hain Mill =

- U.S. National Register of Historic Places
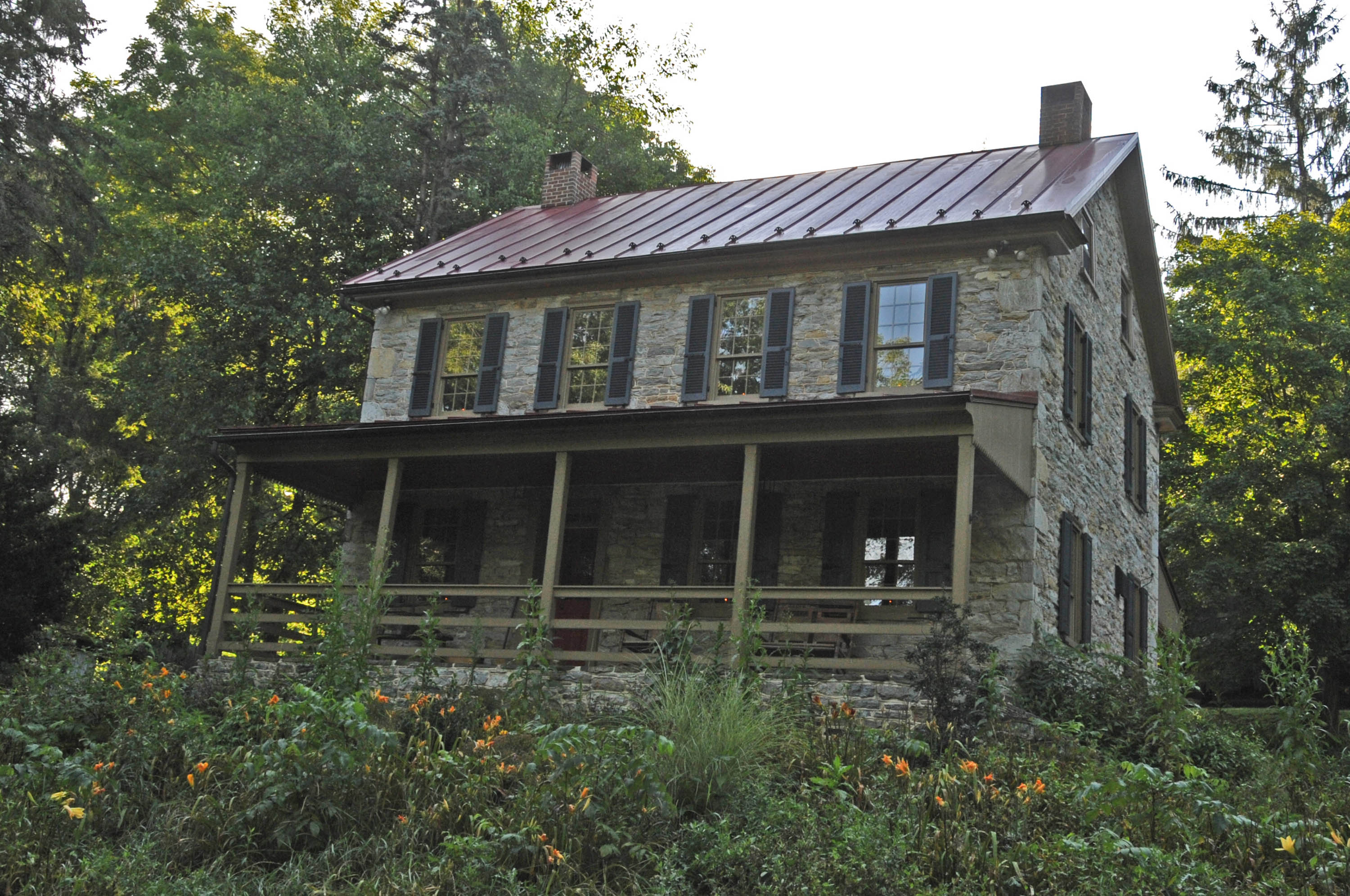

- Location within Pennsylvania Location within the United States
- Location: Junction of Hain Mill Road and Township 495, Lower Heidelberg Township, Pennsylvania
- Coordinates: 40°21′16″N 76°04′58″W
- Area: 7 acres (2.8 ha)
- Built: 1798
- MPS: Gristmills in Berks County MPS
- NRHP reference No.: 90001618
- Added to NRHP: November 8, 1990

The Hain Mill, also known as the Wernersville Mill, is an historic grist mill complex which is located in Lower Heidelberg Township, Berks County, Pennsylvania.

It was listed on the National Register of Historic Places in 1990.

== History and architectural features ==
This merchant mill complex includes a two-and-one-half-story stone mill building that was erected in 1798, a combined stone farmhouse and miller's house that was built in 1782, a two-story, stone and frame barn, a frame toolshed, a frame woodshed and a frame outhouse. The mill ceased operation prior to 1961.
