= Stupp–Oxenrider Farm =

- U.S. National Register of Historic Places
- U.S. Historic district
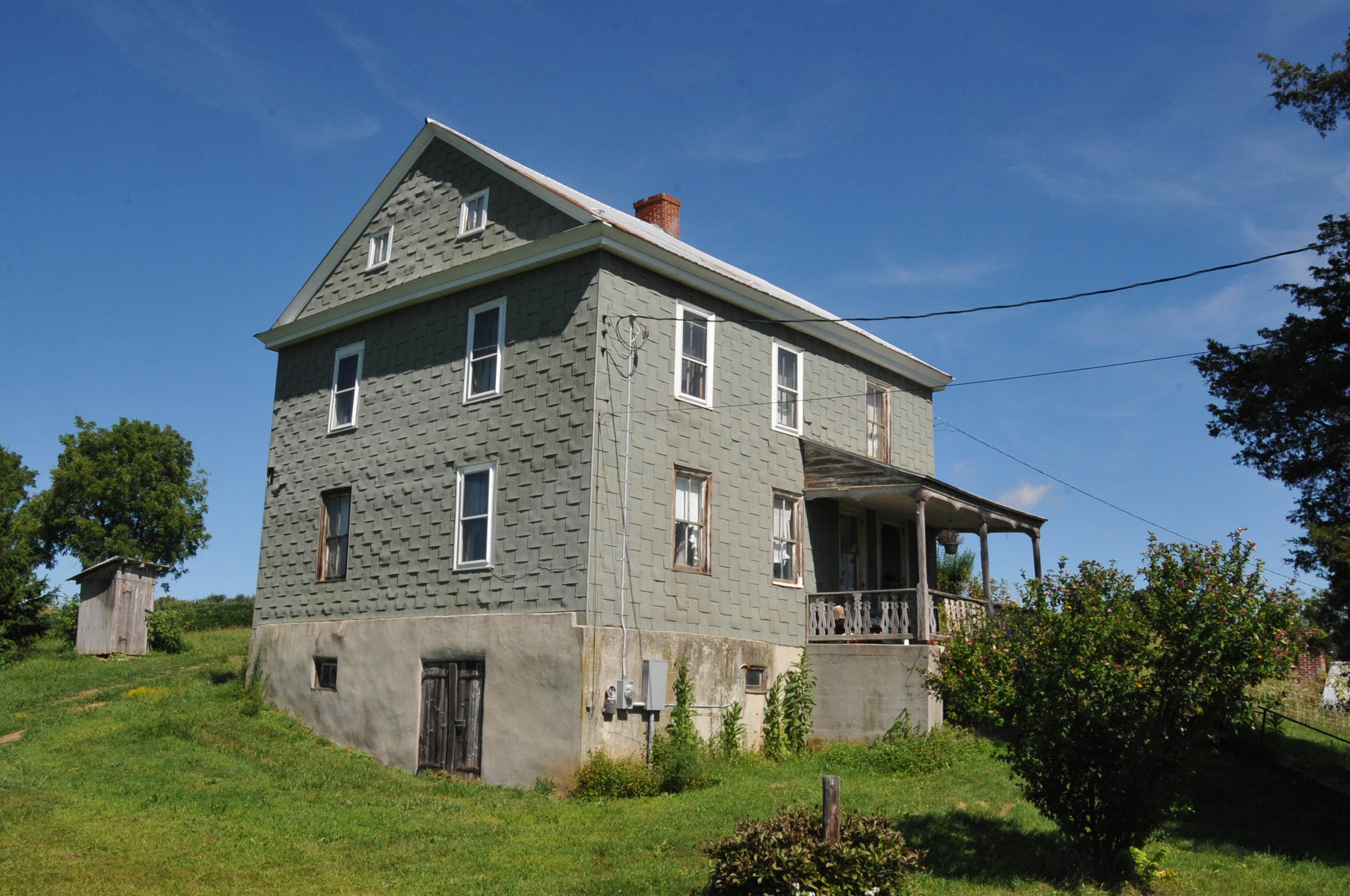

- Location within Pennsylvania Location within the United States
- Location: Dundore Road northwest of Robesonia, North Heidelberg Township, Pennsylvania
- Coordinates: 40°22′56″N 76°09′27″W
- Area: 93 acres (38 ha)
- Built: c. 1784, c. 1790, c. 1850
- Architectural style: Swiss bank house
- MPS: Farms in Berks County MPS
- NRHP reference No.: 92000932
- Added to NRHP: July 29, 1992

The Stupp–Oxenrider Farm is an historic farm complex and national historic district that is located in North Heidelberg Township, Pennsylvania, United States.

It was listed on the National Register of Historic Places in 1992.

== History and architectural features ==
This district has nine contributing buildings, one contributing site, and four contributing structures. They include a 2 1/2-story, log Swiss bank house (c. 1784), a two-story, log, tenant/grandfather's house (c. 1790), and a frame Pennsylvania bank barn (c. 1850). The remaining buildings include a stone summer kitchen/butcher house, a smokehouse, a blacksmith's shop, a wagon shed, a milk house, and an privy. The contributing structures are a chicken house, a brooder house, a pole shed, and a roofed spring. The contributing site is a limestone quarry. The original owners of the farm were ethnic German Swiss Mennonites.
