= Old Dry Road =

- U.S. National Register of Historic Places
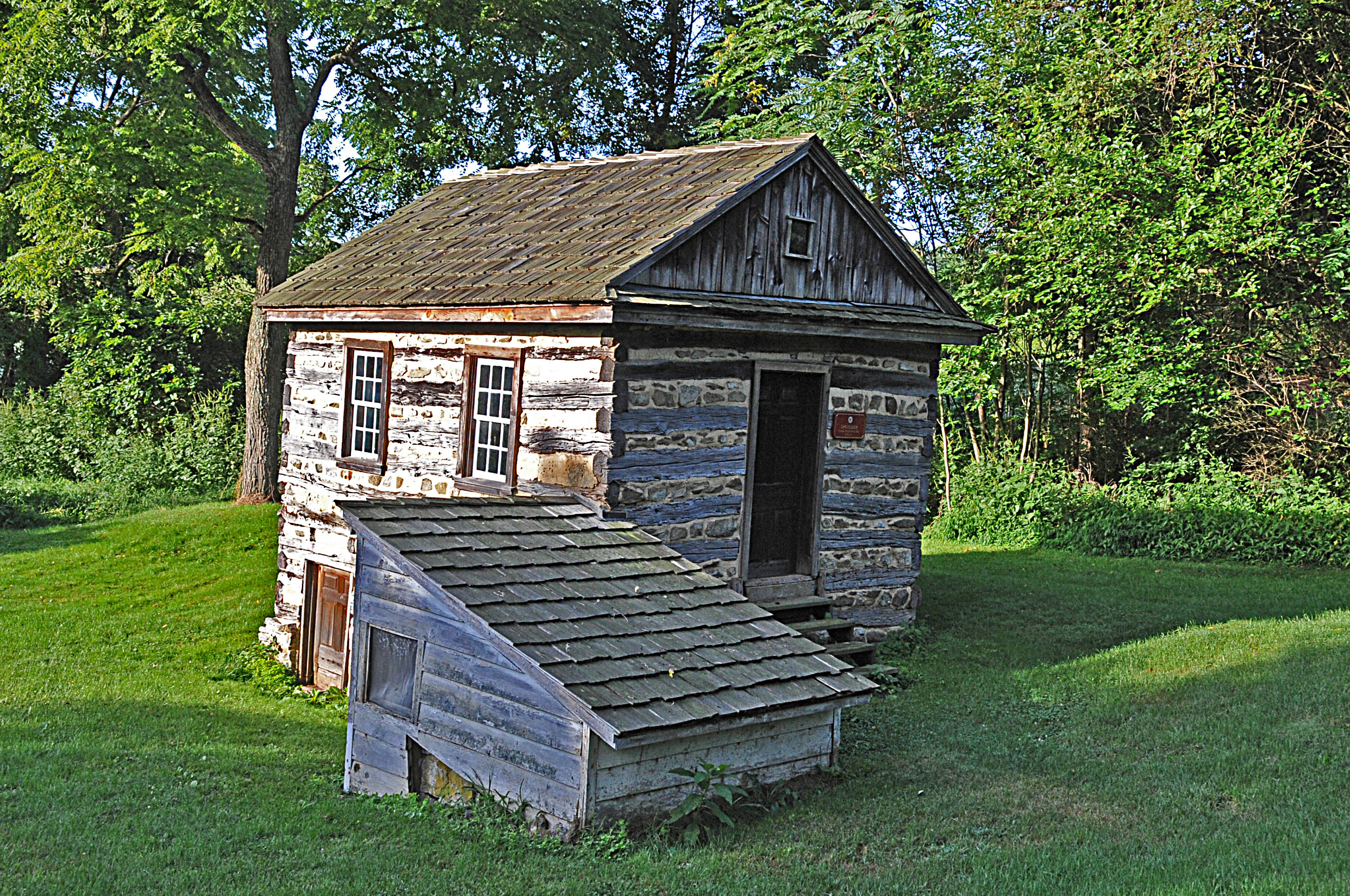

- Location within Pennsylvania Location within the United States
- Location: 3 miles (4.8 km) northwest of Wernersville on Highland Road, Lower Heidelberg Township, Pennsylvania
- Coordinates: 40°22′26″N 76°3′30″W
- Area: 1.3 acres (0.53 ha)
- Built by: Phillip Hase
- Architectural style: Georgian, Speicher
- NRHP reference No.: 78002349
- Added to NRHP: January 23, 1978

Old Dry Road, also known as The Staudt Farm, is an historic home and farm complex that is located in Lower Heidelberg Township, Berks County, Pennsylvania, United States. This farm is situated on a branch of Tulpehocken Creek in the Blue Marsh Lake Recreation Area.

The farm was listed on the National Register of Historic Places in 1978.

== History and architectural features ==
The property was first settled in 1744, and has a late eighteenth-century "Speicher." It is a three-story, banked, log building that was used for storage and preserving. Also located on the property is a Georgian-influenced, log dwelling that dates to somewhere between 1770 and 1805.

The farm was listed on the National Register of Historic Places in 1978.

Old Dry Road Farm is now operated as a living history farm museum. Programs are offered for school groups, and the farm complex is open to the public for special events.
