= Bernville, Pennsylvania =

Borough in Pennsylvania, US

Bernville, Pennsylvania Bannwill
- Borough
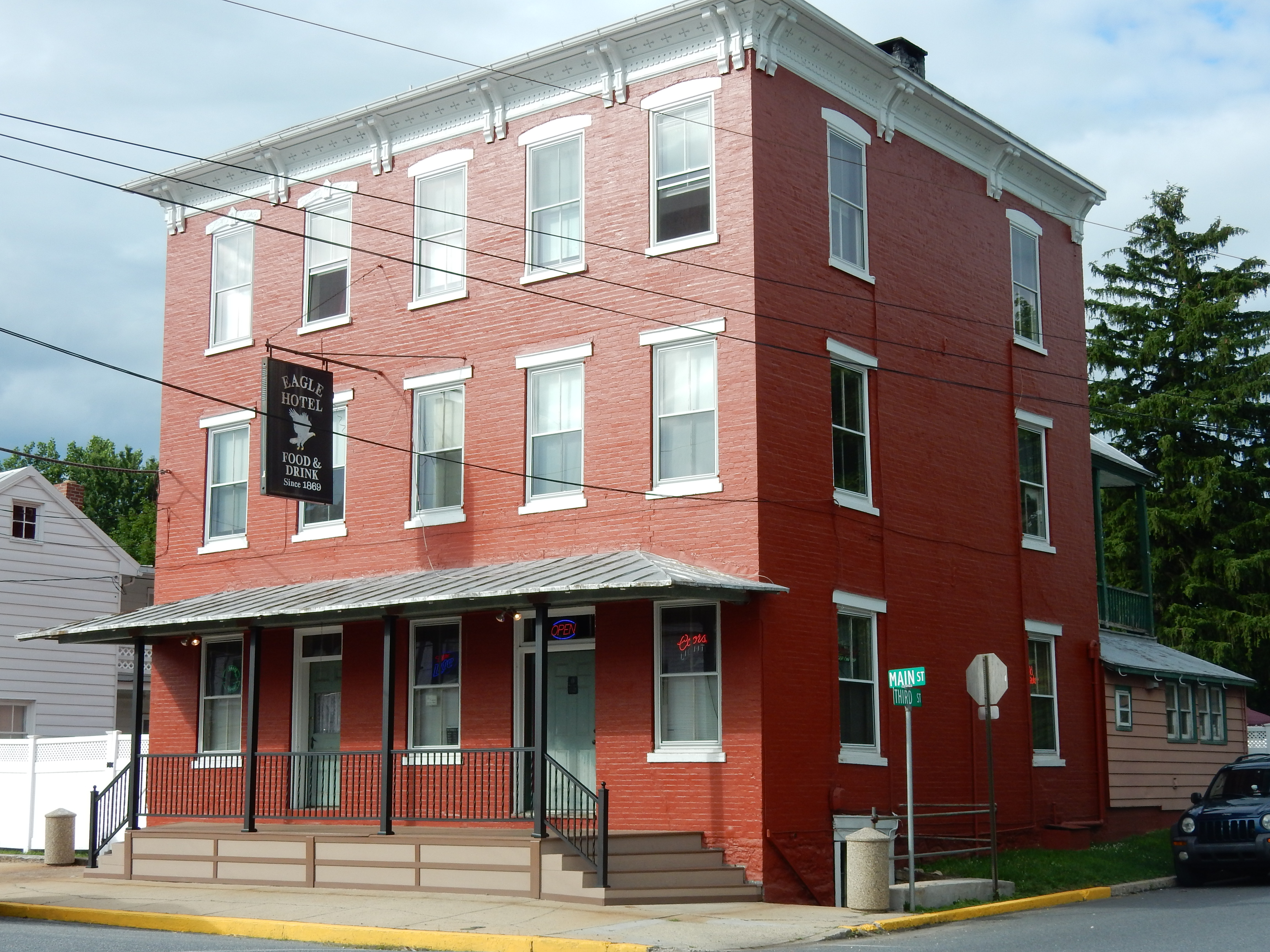
- Eagle Hotel in Bernville, Pennsylvania

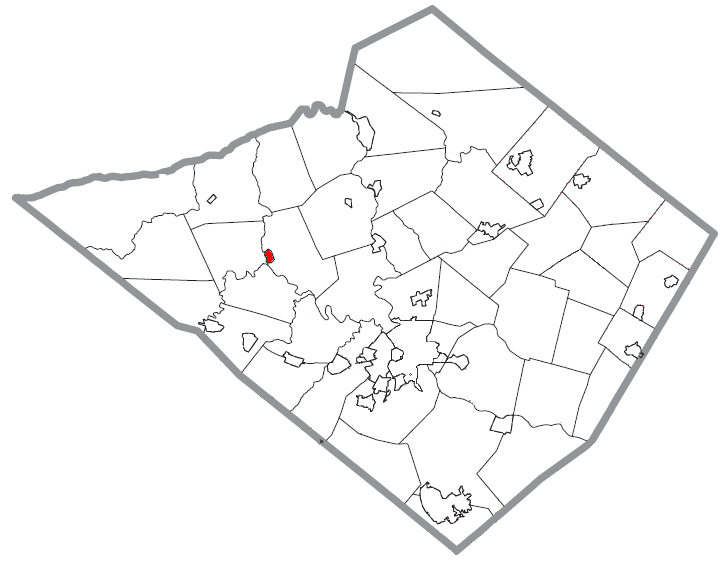
- Location of Bernville in Berks County, Pennsylvania

- Location of Bernville in Pennsylvania Bernville (the United States)
- Coordinates: 40°26′01″N 76°06′40″W
- Country: United States
- State: Pennsylvania
- County: Berks
- School District: Tulpehocken
- Borough: 1851

Government
  - Mayor: Shawn A. Raup-Konsavage (D)
  - Borough Secretary: Brenda Strunk

Area
  - Total: 0.43 sq mi (1.12 km^{2})
  - Land: 0.42 sq mi (1.10 km^{2})
  - Water: 0.0077 sq mi (0.02 km^{2})
- Elevation: 328 ft (100 m)

Population (2020)
  - Total: 905
  - Density: 2,130/sq mi (823/km^{2})
- Time zone: UTC-5 (EST)
  - Summer (DST): UTC-4 (EDT)
- ZIP Code: 19506
- Area code: 610
- FIPS code: 42-05848
- Website: https://bernvilleborough.org/

Bernville (Pennsylvania Dutch: Bannwill) is a borough in Berks County, Pennsylvania, United States. The population was 905 at the 2020 census. Bernville is bordered by Penn Township to the north, east, and south and by Jefferson Township to the west. The borough would have been a county seat of a small county allegedly with borders going as far west as Myerstown and as north as Meckville. Although no official source states it, it's said the county name would have been Tulpehocken County.

== History ==
Before European settlers arrived in the Tulpehocken Creek valley, the area was inhabited by the Lenape people. In 1723, thirty-three Palatine families from Schoharie, New York, moved to the confluences of the Tulpehocken and Northkill Creeks. By 1735, a saw and grist mill was located three and a half miles up the Tulpehocken river from Bernville.

In 1737, Stephanus Umbenhauer immigrated from Bern, Switzerland, and purchased 220 acres (0.89 km^{2}) from Thomas Penn. In 1819, Stephanus' grandson, Johann Thomas Umbenhauer, set aside 46 acres (190,000 m^{2}) to be divided into 62 lots. On 24 August 1819, Peter Bennethum bought the first six lots. In January 1820, the town was named Bernville after Stephanus' birthplace. The first house was built by Philip Filbert in 1820. In 1828, the Union Canal was completed, connecting the Susquehanna and Schuylkill rivers. Union Canal guard lock #36 and Lock #36 with a lift of 5.0 feet (1.5 m) is located at the southwest corner of Bernville, near where Northkill Creek empties into Tulpehocken Creek. An historic marker on Route 183 states: "The canal, at this point, followed the north bank of the Tulpehocken. A dam, two locks, and a mule bridge made it possible for boats to cross Northkill Creek. Nearby were grist mills, a lime kiln, and a tannery." Due to the proximity of the Bernville Locks and the town's location on the canal, Bernville was a primary and prospering canal port.

In 1851, the village of Bernville, discontented with Penn Township's road maintenance and community services, incorporated as a borough. The borough included the original 62 lots, most of which measured 60 by 260 feet (18 by 79 m). In 1884, the Union Canal closed. With no canal or railroad access, Bernville withered. In 1950, Bernville Borough annexed property from Penn Township at both ends of Main Street.

== Geography ==
Bernville is located at 40°26′1″N 76°6′40″W (40.433742, -76.111039). According to the U.S. Census Bureau, the borough has a total area of 0.42 square miles (1.1 km^{2}), of which 0.008 square miles (0.02 km^{2}), or 1.52%, is water. The boundary with Jefferson Township is formed primarily by Northkill Creek, but diverges from the creek north of its confluence with Little Northkill Creek.

== Buildings ==
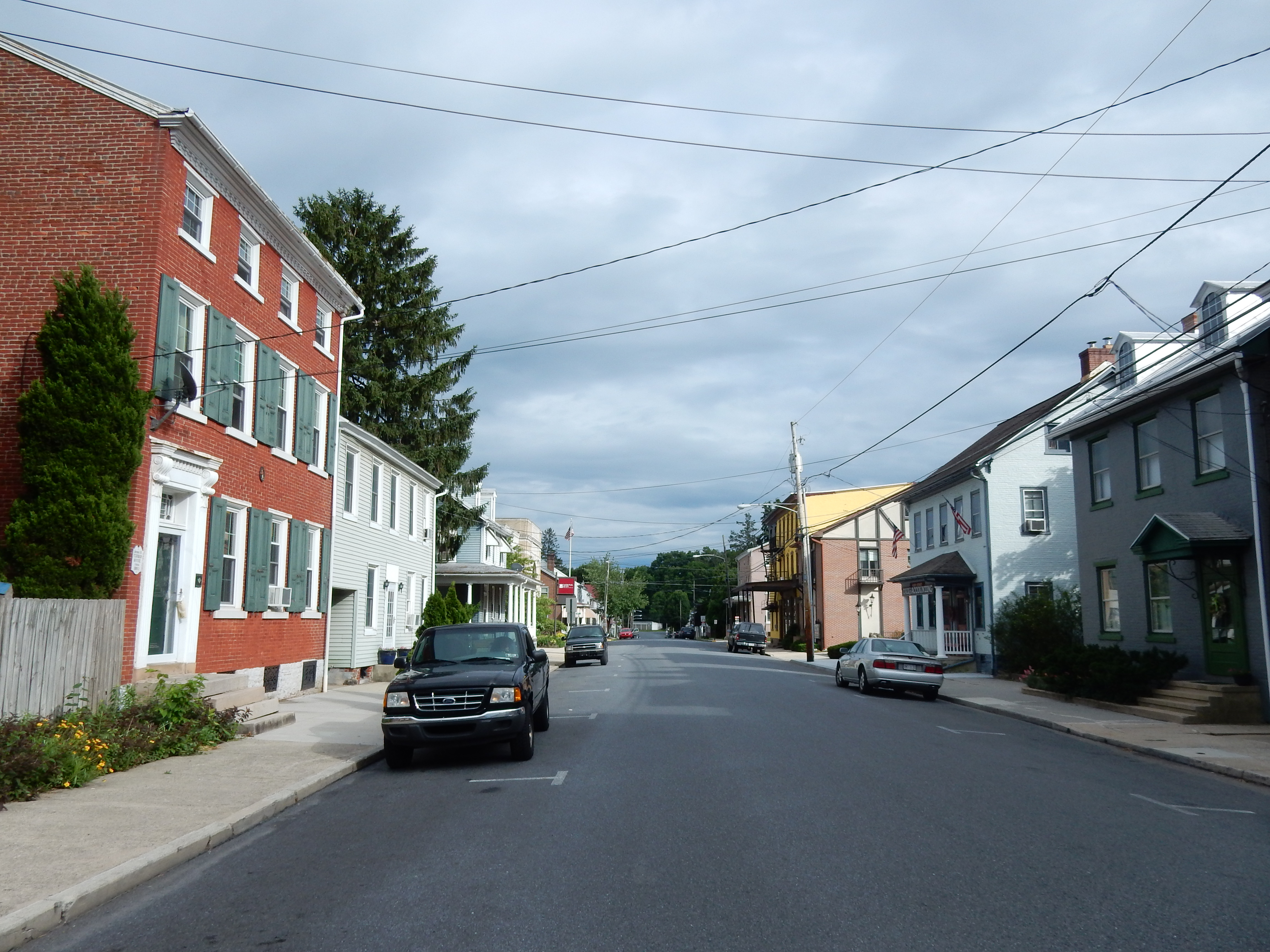
Main Street in Bernville

Main Street was laid out in 1819 and has numerous buildings dating back to the nineteenth century, including the Cyrus G. Blatt home (501-503 N. Main), the Eagle Hotel (301 N. Main) and the Joseph B. Conrad home (219 N. Main). Main Street is also the location of both churches: St. Thomas's UCC, and Evangelical Lutheran Friedens Church. The churches are located across the street from each other.

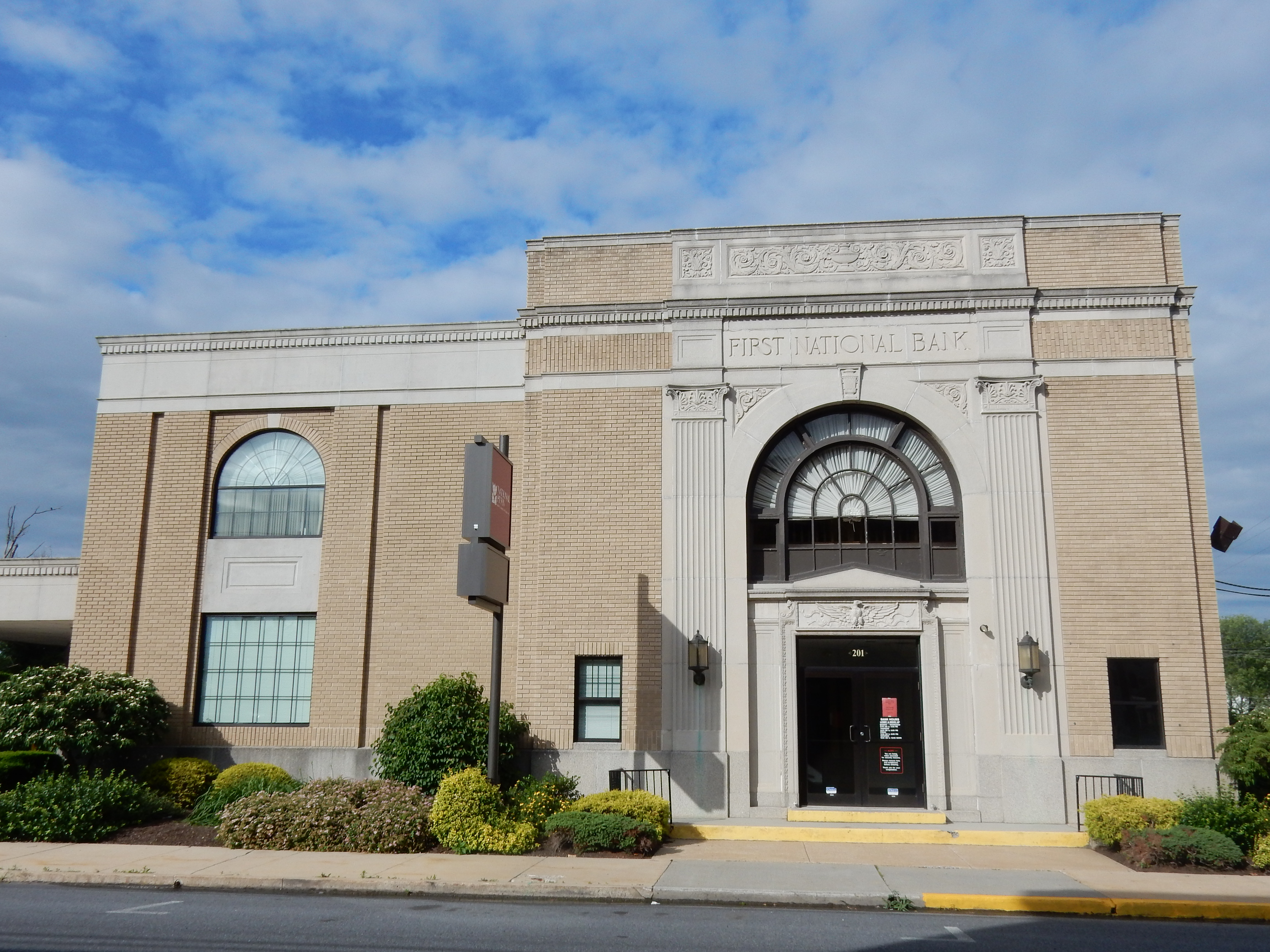
BB&T Bank

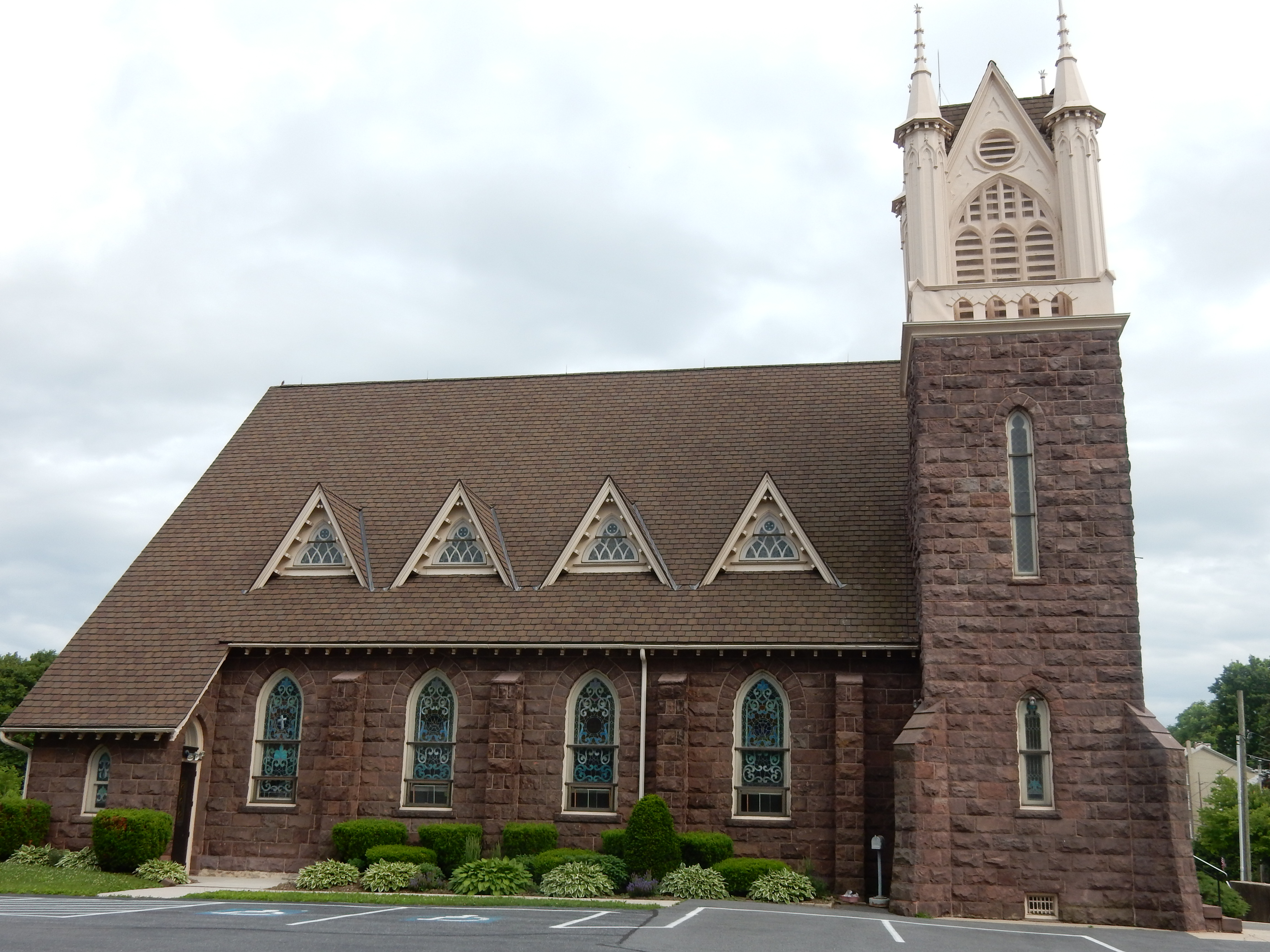
Evangelical Lutheran Friedens Church

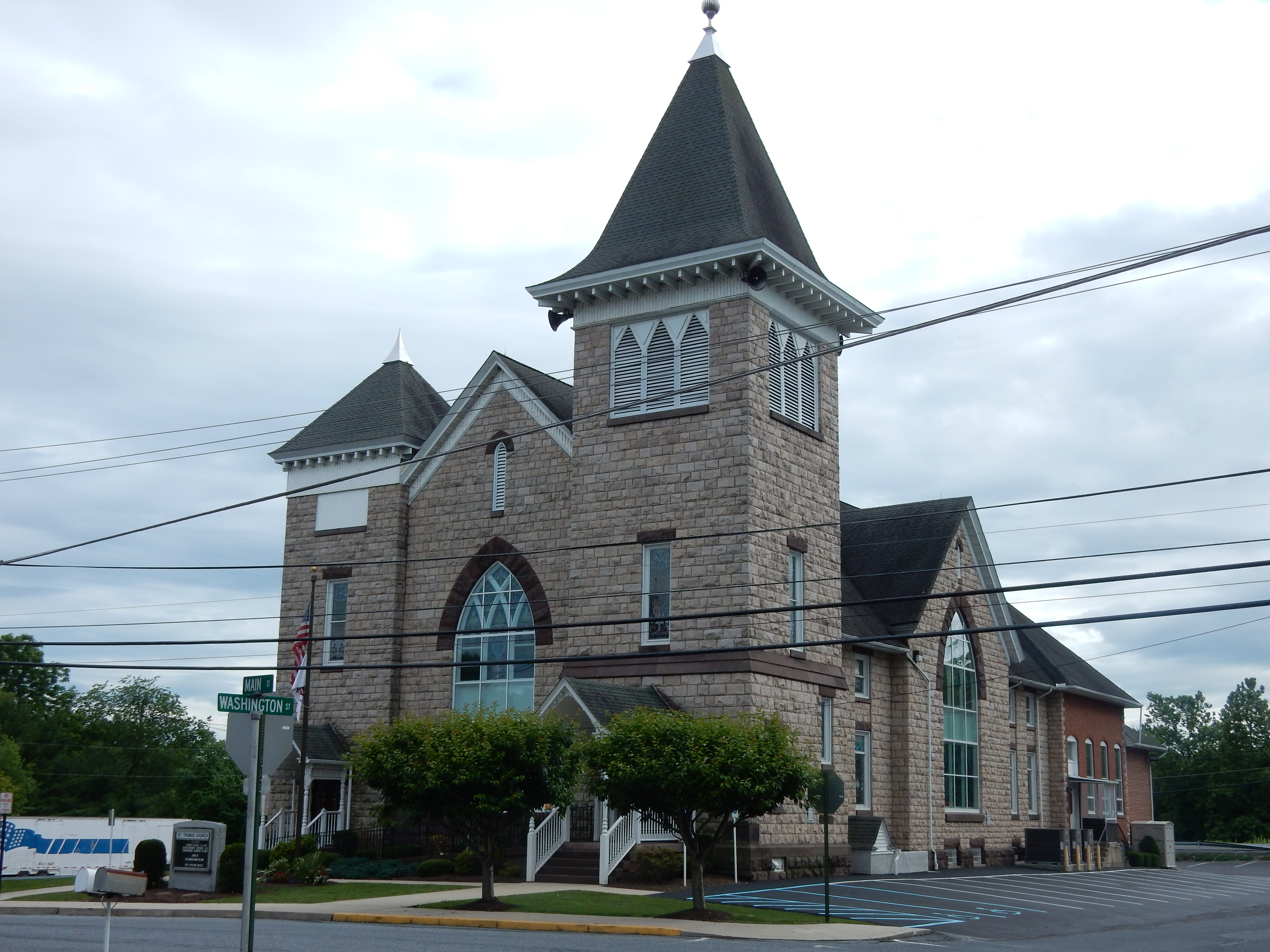
St. Thomas Church

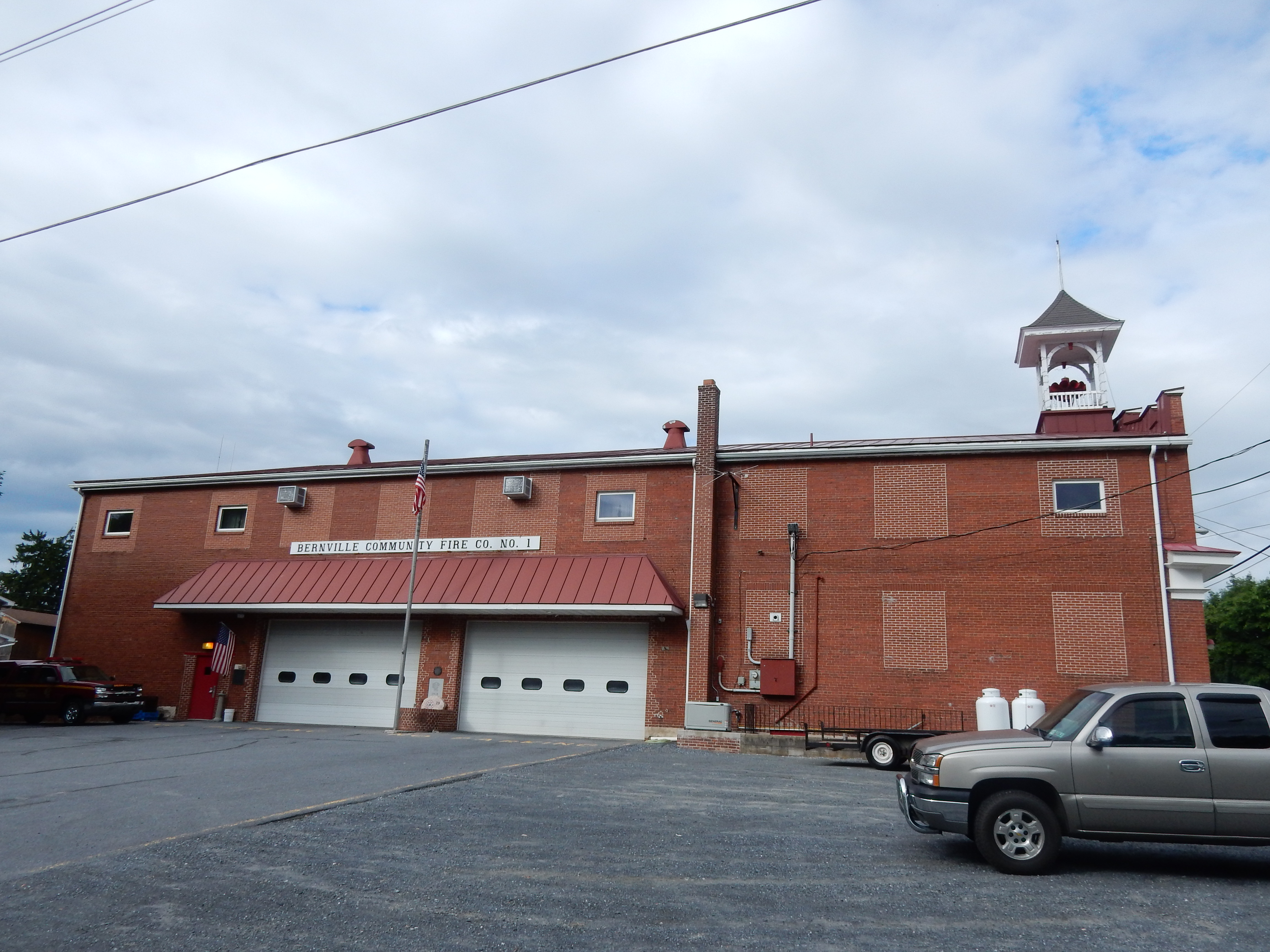
Bernville Community Fire Co. No. 1

== Demographics ==
Historical population
Census	Pop.	Note	%±
1870	457		—
1880	405		−11.4%
1890	365		−9.9%
1900	344		−5.8%
1910	308		−10.5%
1920	302		−1.9%
1930	322		6.6%
1940	339		5.3%
1950	363		7.1%
1960	884		143.5%
1970	848		−4.1%
1980	798		−5.9%
1990	789		−1.1%
2000	865		9.6%
2010	955		10.4%
2020	905		−5.2%

As of the 2000 census, there were 865 people, 351 households, and 249 families residing in the borough. The population density was 2,121.8 inhabitants per square mile (819.2/km^{2}). There were 372 housing units at an average density of 912.5 per square mile (352.3/km^{2}). The racial makeup of the borough was 98.03% White, 0.58% African American, 0.81% from other races, and 0.58% from two or more races. Hispanic or Latino of any race were 1.39% of the population.

There were 351 households, out of which 31.6% had children under the age of 18 living with them, 54.7% were married couples living together, 10.8% had a female householder with no husband present, and 28.8% were non-families. 22.8% of all households were made up of individuals, and 10.3% had someone living alone who was 65 years of age or older. The average household size was 2.46 and the average family size was 2.85.

In the borough, the population was spread out, with 25.2% under the age of 18, 5.8% from 18 to 24, 32.8% from 25 to 44, 20.1% from 45 to 64, and 16.1% who were 65 years of age or older. The median age was 36 years. For every 100 females there were 90.1 males. For every 100 females age 18 and over, there were 89.2 males.

The median income for a household in the borough was $41,250, and the median income for a family was $47,031. Males had a median income of $32,679 versus $25,109 for females. The per capita income for the borough was $19,038. About 7.5% of families and 8.2% of the population were below the poverty line, including 19.9% of those under age 18 and none of those age 65 or over.

== Parks ==
Bernville has two parks. Umbenhauer Park, on Umbenhauer Drive, is home to a baseball field, tot-lot, and pavilion. Stanton Clay Park, on the corner of Third Street and Penn Valley Road, is home to a gazebo and a small field.

Northkill Creek feeds into Blue Marsh Lake, and the Blue Marsh slackwater is federal property. Hence a portion of Bernville is part of the Blue Marsh system. Blue Marsh Lake is a popular recreation site, offering hiking, boating, and fishing. The lake is also important for water supply, flood control, and wildlife habitat. A levee along Northkill Creek protects Bernville from Blue Marsh flooding above 300 feet (91 m) elevation.

Bernville also used to be home of Blue Marsh Ski Resort, before it ceased operations in 2005.

== Education ==
The Tulpehocken Area School District serves Bernville, with Penn-Bernville Elementary School located just outside the borough.

== Transportation ==
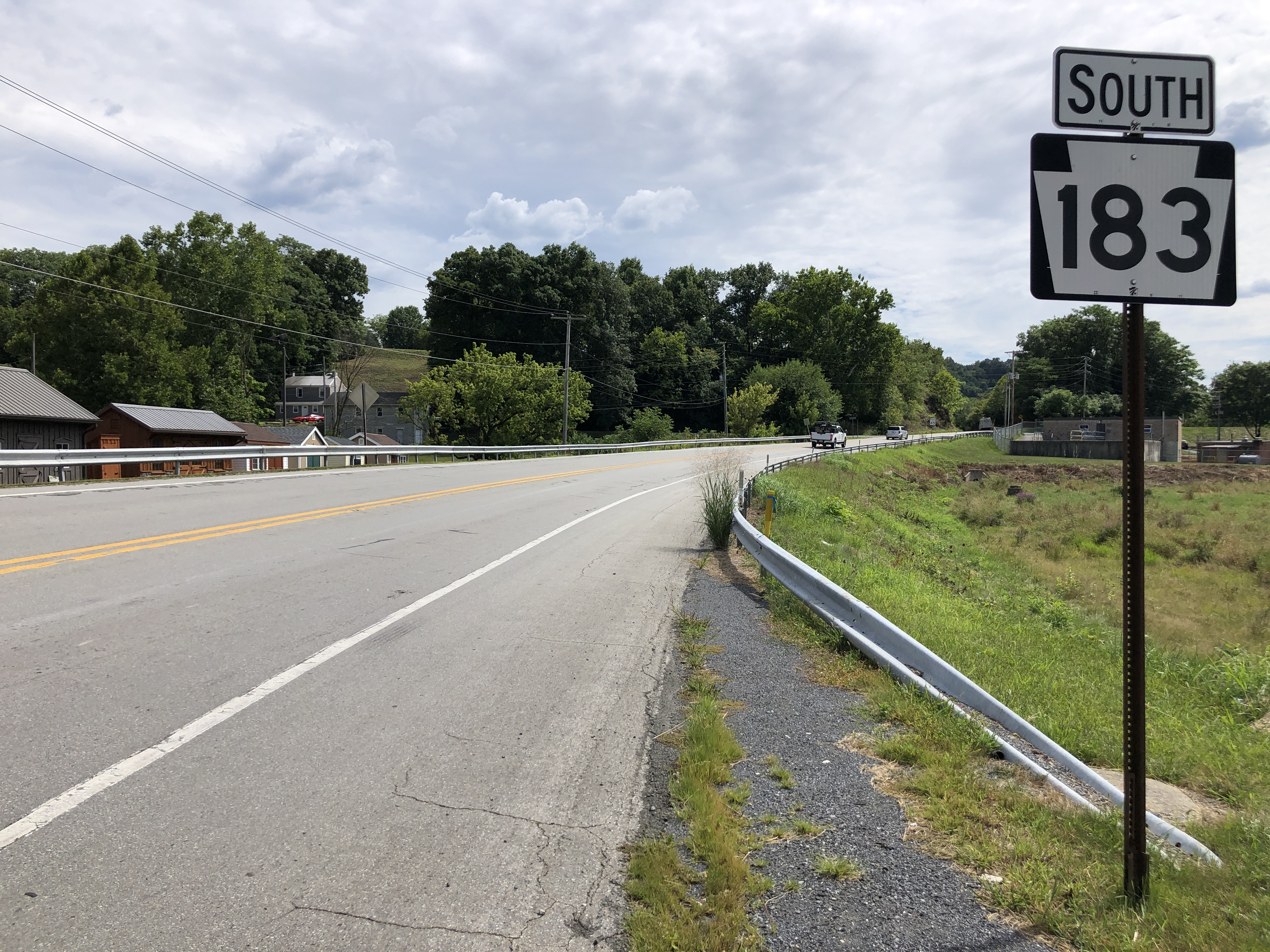
PA 183 southbound in Bernville

As of 2020, there were 5.92 miles (9.53 km) of public roads in Bernville, of which 1.15 miles (1.85 km) were maintained by the Pennsylvania Department of Transportation (PennDOT) and 4.77 miles (7.68 km) were maintained by the borough.

Pennsylvania Route 183 is the only numbered highway serving Bernville. It follows Bernville Road along a northwest-to-southeast alignment on the southwest side of the borough. PA 183 was built on the route laid out for the South Mountain Railroad, which was never built. Main Street runs parallel to PA 183 two blocks to the northeast. It divides Bernville roughly east–west and spans the length of the original borough.

Two covered bridges, which no longer exist, crossed Northkill Creek, connecting Bernville with Jefferson Township. The Northkill Covered Bridge, 1848-~1950, crossed at 4th Street. The South Bernville Covered Bridge, 1849–1938, crossed near the South Bernville Hotel (a.k.a., Newport Hotel).

== Notable people ==
- Walter L. Stewart Jr., US Army major general
- Rocky Colavito, MLB player, member of the Cleveland Indians Hall of Fame,
