= Knorr–Bare Farm =

- U.S. National Register of Historic Places
- U.S. Historic district
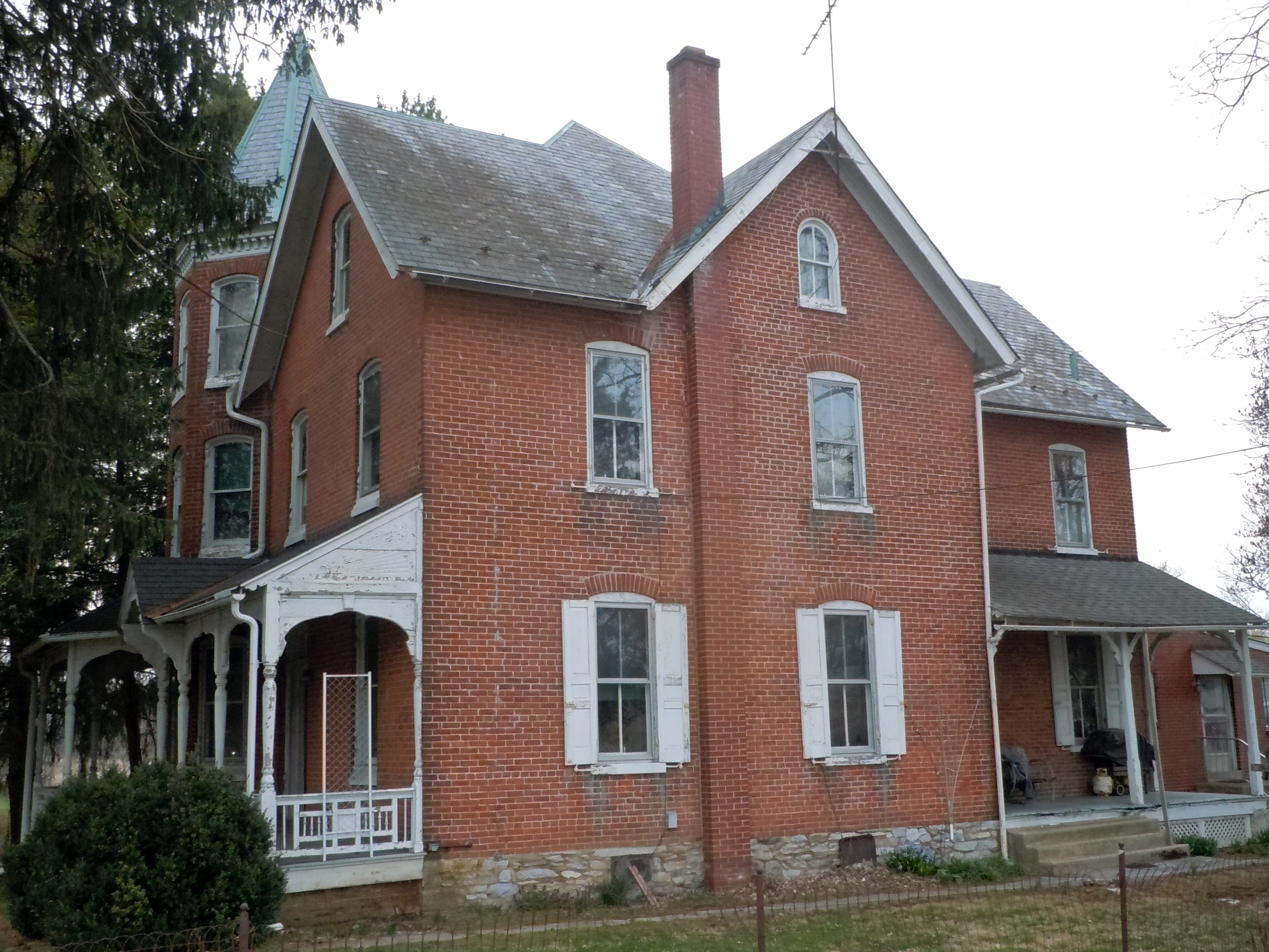
- Knorr–Bare Farmhouse, April 2011

- Location within Pennsylvania Location within the United States
- Location: 4995 Penn Ave., Lower Heidelberg Township, Pennsylvania
- Coordinates: 40°19′23″N 76°03′43″W
- Area: 192 acres (78 ha)
- Built: 1755, 1896, 1906
- Architectural style: Pennsylvania bank barn
- MPS: Farms in Berks County MPS
- NRHP reference No.: 92000935
- Added to NRHP: July 29, 1992

The Knorr–Bare Farm is an historic farm complex and national historic district that are located in Lower Heidelberg Township, Berks County, Pennsylvania, United States.

It was listed on the National Register of Historic Places in 1992.

== History and architectural features ==
This district has thirteen contributing buildings and eight contributing structures, including a two-and-one-half-story, four-bay, brick farmhouse (1906), a frame-style, Pennsylvania bank barn (1896), and one-and-one-half-story stone cabin (c. 1755). The remaining buildings were built primarily between 1896 and 1940, with two tenant houses dating to the late-eighteenth and mid-nineteenth centuries. Other buildings include a milk house, a smoke house/bake house, an outhouse, four wagon sheds, and a hay barn. The contributing structures include a lime kiln, silo (c. 1940), and a variety of animal shelters.
