= Tulpehocken Creek Historic District =

Historic district in Pennsylvania, United States

- U.S. National Register of Historic Places
- U.S. Historic district
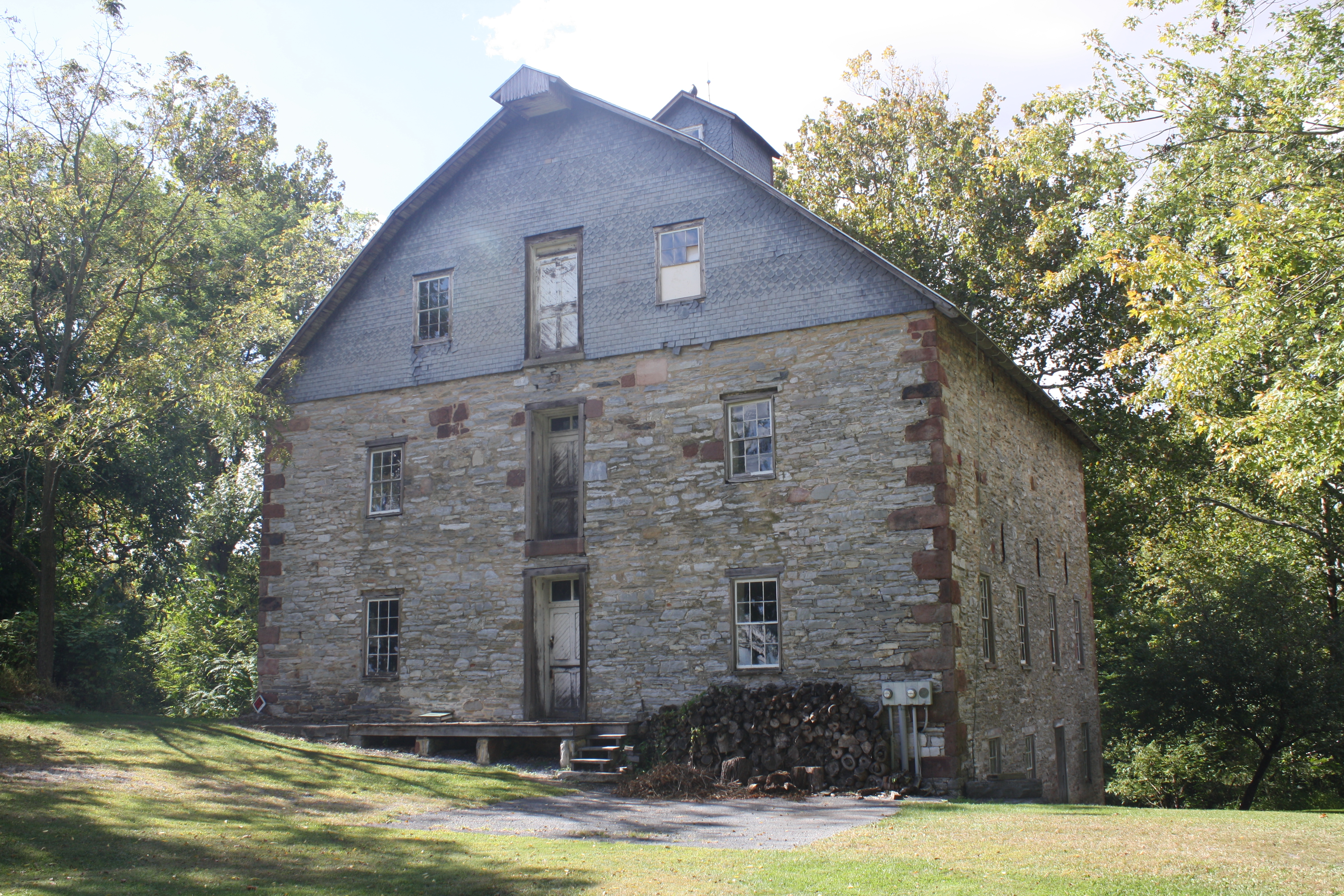
- Mill in Womelsdorf. September 2013.

- Location within Pennsylvania Location within the United States
- Location: Tulpehocken and Mill Creeks from Berks-Lebanon line to Blue March Dam between Millardsville and Bernville, Marion Township, North Heidelberg Township, and Lower Heidelberg Township, Pennsylvania
- Coordinates: 40°23′13″N 76°11′21″W
- Area: 1,700 acres (690 ha)
- Built: 1723
- Architectural style: Colonial German
- NRHP reference No.: 85000672
- Added to NRHP: March 28, 1985

The Tulpehocken Creek Historic District is a national historic district located in North Heidelberg Township, and Lower Heidelberg Township, Berks County, Pennsylvania. Encompassing a total of 17,000 acres, this district stretches from the Tulpehocken Creek and Mill Creek at the Berks County-Lebanon County line to the Blue March Dam between Bernville and Millardsville, and is composed of 152 contributing buildings, one contributing site, and four contributing structures which were related to the development which occurred along the upper Tulpehocken Creek from the early 18th century through the late 19th century. Historic buildings located here include early settlement period log cabins, which were built between 1723 and 1750; buildings related to the Charming Forge community, which existed between 1749 and 1895; an early 18th century cemetery and early 19th century church; buildings related to 18th and 19th century farming operations; and structures associated with the development and operation of the Union Canal.

It was listed on the National Register of Historic Places in 1985.

== History ==
According to Phoebe L. Hopkins of the Berks County Conservancy, who was involved in preparing the June 1984 application to the National Register for creation of the Tulpehocken Creek Historic District, this district "is significant as the original settlement area of Western Berks County. Not only was it the destination of the German community that transplanted itself from Schoharie, New York to Pennsylvania in the 1720s, but it was the pathway they followed, the last leg of their water route via the Susquehanna and Swatara and Tulpehocken to their ultimate home."

"It has been written that the Tulpehocken Settlement of 1723-1729 marked the beginning of one of the great population movements in Colonial America - the German migration to Pennsylvania. The original Tulpehocken settlers had formerly been part of a group of some 4000 Palatine Germans who colonized New York State under Governor Hunter in 1710. Unable to carry out the impractical plan of producing tar for the Queen's Navy to pay their passage, or later to acquire land titles to farmland in the Schoharie Valley, a good portion of the Schoharie Community traveled to Tulpehocken in groups of fifteen to fifty families."

Many were led to the Tulpehocken by Conrad Weiser, a Pennsylvania Dutch pioneer, interpreter and diplomat between the Pennsylvania Colony and Native Americans. Also according to Hopkins, the boundaries of the district were decided upon by planners for several reasons:

"The Berks/Lebanon County line was chosen as the western border because it reflects the limit of the Berks County Conservancy survey and is an easily understood historical boundary established in 1752.... The Blue Marsh Lake was designated as the eastern edge of the district because this also is easily identified and because the damming of the creek greatly changed the area, flooding many historic sites which bordered the stream."

== Notable buildings ==
The Tulpehocken Historic District is made up of 152 contributing buildings, one contributing site, and four contributing structures related to development along upper Tulpehocken Creek, including:

- Log cabins from the early settlement period (1723-1750), such as the 1 1/2-story center chimney cabins built by Godfrey Fidler and Frederick Reed;
- Reed's Cemetery (1723);
- Christ Little Tulpehocken Church (original log church built in 1730, present church built in 1809);
- Charming Forge (1749-1895), an iron-making community which became the most important industrial site along the Tulpehocken, which includes a Georgian mansion built by George Ege (1784);
- Christ Lutheran Church (original log church built in 1743, present church built in 1786);
- 18th and 19th century farm complexes built in the Germanic style, including five stone and five log houses (1753-1797), one log and nine stone barns, and gristmills; and
- Buildings related to the development and operation of the Union Canal (1827-1884).
