= Blue Marsh Lake =

Lake in U.S. state of Pennsylvania

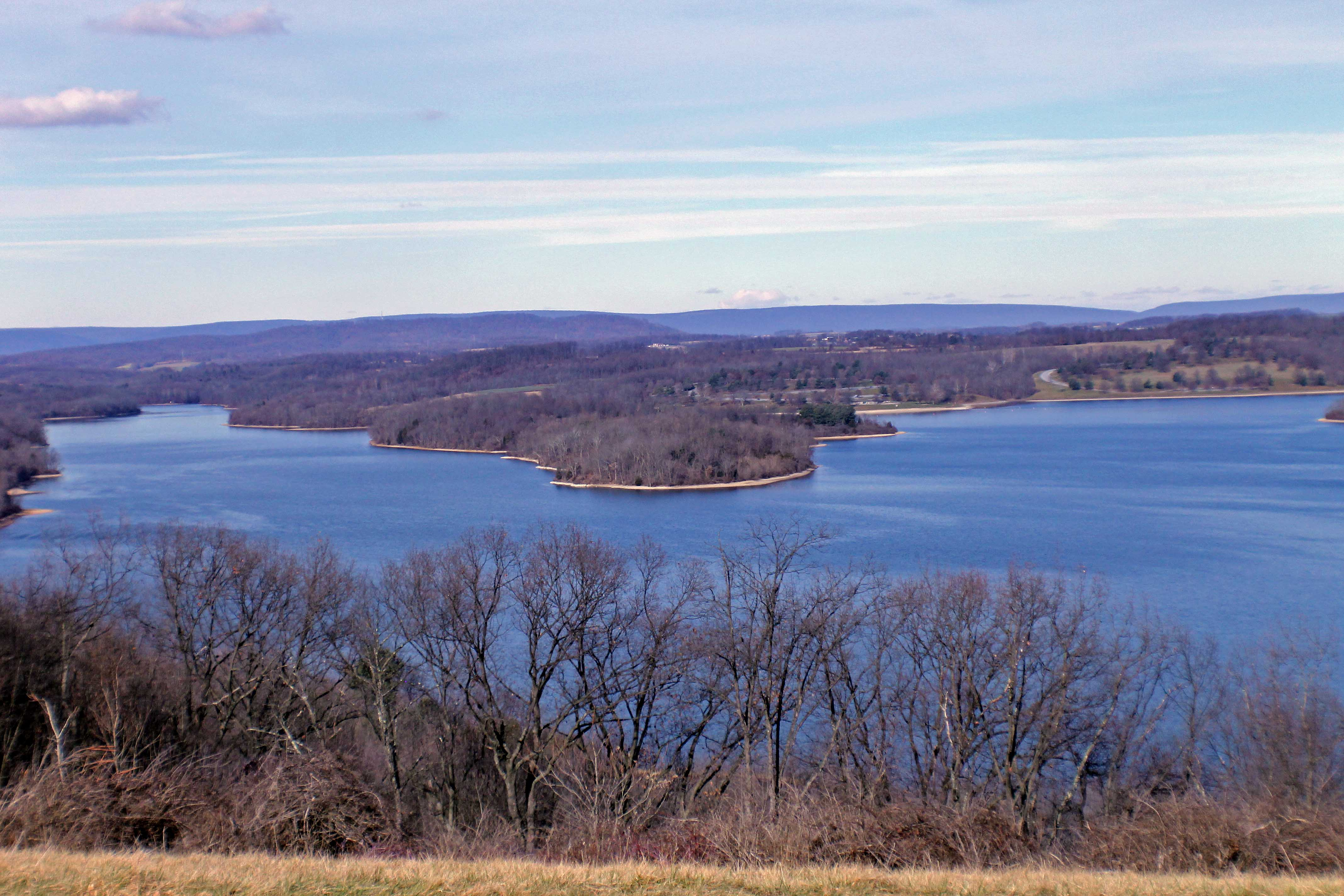
- A view on the hill above the State Hill boat ramp

- Location within Pennsylvania Location within the United States
- Interactive map of Blue Marsh Lake
- Location: Reading, Pennsylvania
- Coordinates: 40°22′48″N 76°01′53″W
- Type: Lake
- Etymology: Blue Marsh Village (formerly)
- Primary inflows: Northkill Creek
- Primary outflows: Tulpehocken Creek
- Basin countries: United States
- Managing agency: U.S. Army Corps of Engineers
- Built: 1974; 52 years ago
- Construction engineer: U.S. Army Corps of Engineers
- First flooded: 1979
- Max. length: 8 miles (13 km)
- Surface area: 1,147 acres (464 ha)
- Water volume: 16×10^{12} US gallons (6.1×10^{13} L; 1.3×10^{13} imp gal)
- Surface elevation: 289 feet (88 m)
- Islands: 1
- Website: Official Website

Blue Marsh Lake is an artificial lake located northwest of the city of Reading, Pennsylvania, USA and managed by the U.S. Army Corps of Engineers Philadelphia District. It is in western Berks County, fed into by the Tulpehocken Creek. The main span of the lake is along the border between Bern and Lower Heidelberg Townships. However, the northwesternmost portions lie in the more sparsely populated North Heidelberg and Penn Townships. In the middle of the lake is a large, uninhabited island (claimed by Bern Township). The lake is a popular recreation area in the summer, where people can fish, swim, and boat. It has 36 miles (58 km) of trails and 1,147 acres (464 ha) of water. It is at an elevation of 289 feet (88 m). It was built and is operated by the U.S. Army Corps of Engineers, Philadelphia District.

== History ==
Blue Marsh was the name of the village that was located where the lake now is, and locals called the area Pleasant Valley. It was the first settlement in Lower Heidelberg Township. The land was very fertile. It was also a heavily forested area with abundance of wildlife. There were many farms and 18th and 19th century homes. The village also had a church, schoolhouse, post office, and Pyles General Store. Some buildings were spared, such as Gruber Wagon Works, which was originally in Obold village (present day Mt. Pleasant) but was moved a safe distance away before the dam was created. Others include Old Dry Rd. Farm, which most of its buildings were relocated out of the village. Residents were put under eminent domain and had no choice but to move out. Initial authorization for the reservoir was granted by the Flood Control Act of 1962 that started eight projects on the Delaware River basin. The Pennsylvania Project 70 Land Acquisition and Borrowing Act provided funding and permitted the eminent domain acquisition of the land that would later become the lake with the governor's permission in 1969. The United States Army Corps of Engineers began constructing the lake in March 1974 with the impoundment of the Tulpehocken Creek and was completed in September 1979.
