= Lower Heidelberg Township, Pennsylvania =

Township in Pennsylvania, US

Lower Heidelberg Township
- Township
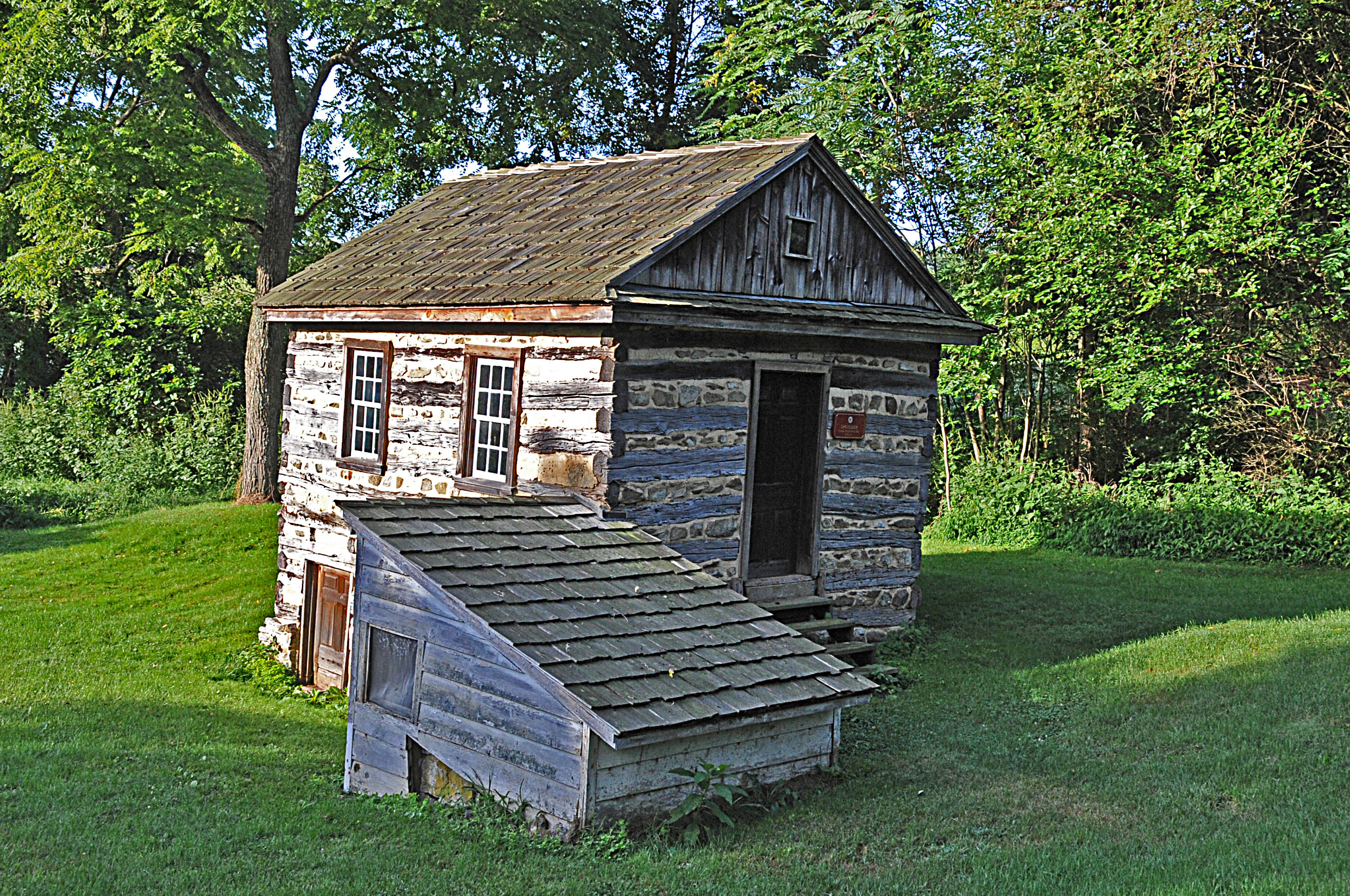
- Old Dry Road

- Location of Lower Heidelberg Township in Pennsylvania Lower Heidelberg Township (the United States)
- Coordinates: 40°22′36″N 76°03′59″W
- Country: United States
- State: Pennsylvania
- County: Berks
- Founded: 1842

Area
  - Total: 15.42 sq mi (39.95 km^{2})
  - Land: 14.84 sq mi (38.44 km^{2})
  - Water: 0.58 sq mi (1.50 km^{2})
- Elevation: 394 ft (120 m)

Population (2010)
  - Total: 5,513
  - Estimate (2016): 6,044
  - Density: 407.2/sq mi (157.22/km^{2})
- Time zone: UTC-5 (EST)
  - Summer (DST): UTC-4 (EDT)
- Area code: 610
- FIPS code: 42-011-44928
- Website: www.lowerheidelbergtownship.org

Lower Heidelberg Township is a township in Berks County, Pennsylvania, United States. The population was 5,513 at the 2010 census.

== History ==
The Hain Mill, Knorr-Bare Farm, Old Dry Road, and Tulpehocken Creek Historic District are listed on the National Register of Historic Places.

== Geography ==
According to the U.S. Census Bureau, the township has a total area of 15.5 square miles (40.1 km^{2}), of which 14.9 square miles (38.7 km^{2}) is land and 0.5 square mile (1.4 km^{2}) (3.49%) is water.

=== Adjacent townships ===
- South Heidelberg Township (south)
- Heidelberg Township (west)
- North Heidelberg Township (northwest)
- Penn Township (far north)
- Bern Township (north)
- Spring Township (east)

Adjacent boroughs

- Sinking Spring (southeast)
- Wernersville (south)

The unincorporated communities of Brownsville, State Hill, Cacoosing, Wooltown, (former) Blue Marsh are located in Lower Heidelberg Township.

== Demographics ==
Historical population
| Census | Pop. | Note | %± |
|---|---|---|---|
| 1980 | 1,819 | | — |
| 1990 | 2,209 | | 21.4% |
| 2000 | 4,150 | | 87.9% |
| 2010 | 5,513 | | 32.8% |
| 2016 (est.) | 6,044 | | 9.6% |
Source: US Census Bureau

As of the 2000 census, there were 4,150 people, 1,544 households, and 1,156 families living in the township. The population density was 277.7 inhabitants per square mile (107.2/km^{2}). There were 1,578 housing units at an average density of 105.6 per square mile (40.8/km^{2}). The racial makeup of the township was 97.30% White, 0.87% African American, 0.02% Native American, 1.18% Asian, 0.27% from other races, and 0.36% from two or more races. Hispanic or Latino of any race were 1.04% of the population.

There were 1,544 households, out of which 35.0% had children under the age of 18 living with them, 67.3% were married couples living together, 5.1% had a female householder with no husband present, and 25.1% were non-families. 22.1% of all households were made up of individuals, and 14.2% had someone living alone who was 65 years of age or older. The average household size was 2.64 and the average family size was 3.11.

In the township, the population was spread out, with 26.6% under the age of 18, 5.1% from 18 to 24, 27.3% from 25 to 44, 23.0% from 45 to 64, and 18.0% who were 65 years of age or older. The median age was 40 years. For every 100 females, there were 91.9 males. For every 100 females age 18 and over, there were 88.7 males.

The median income for a household in the township was $61,375, and the median income for a family was $69,706. Males had a median income of $50,391 versus $27,500 for females. The per capita income for the township was $27,700. About 1.4% of families and 2.9% of the population were below the poverty line, including 1.5% of those under age 18 and 9.6% of those age 65 or over.

== Recreation ==
Part of the Blue Marsh Lake and part of the Pennsylvania State Game Lands Number 280 is located in the northern part of the township.

== Transportation ==
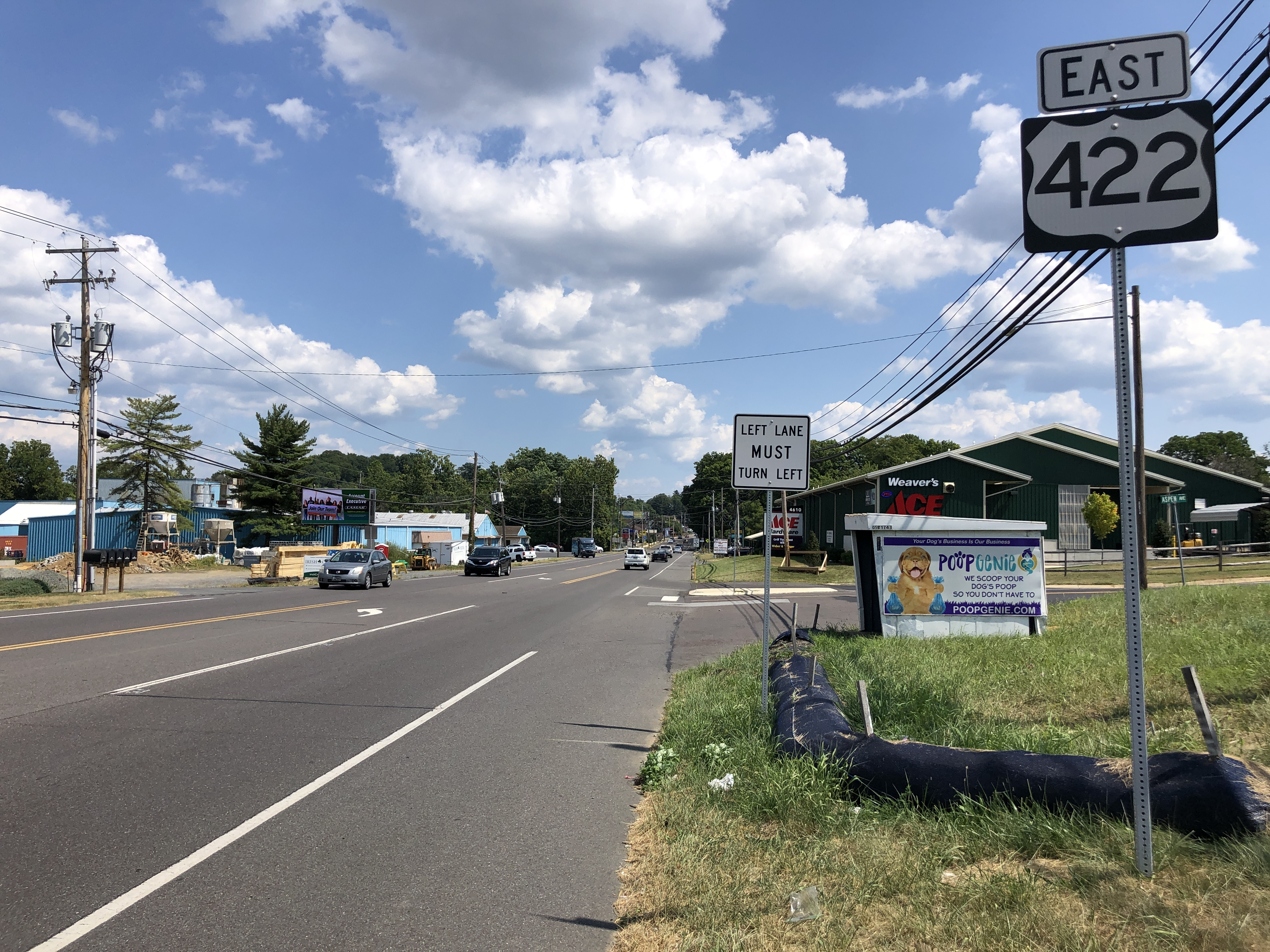
US 422 eastbound along the south edge of Lower Heidelberg Township

As of 2019, there were 50.62 miles (81.46 km) of public roads in Lower Heidelberg Township, of which 17.40 miles (28.00 km) were maintained by the Pennsylvania Department of Transportation (PennDOT) and 33.22 miles (53.46 km) were maintained by the township.

U.S. Route 422 is the only numbered highway serving Lower Heidelberg Township. It follows an east-west alignment along the southern edge of the township.

== Gallery ==
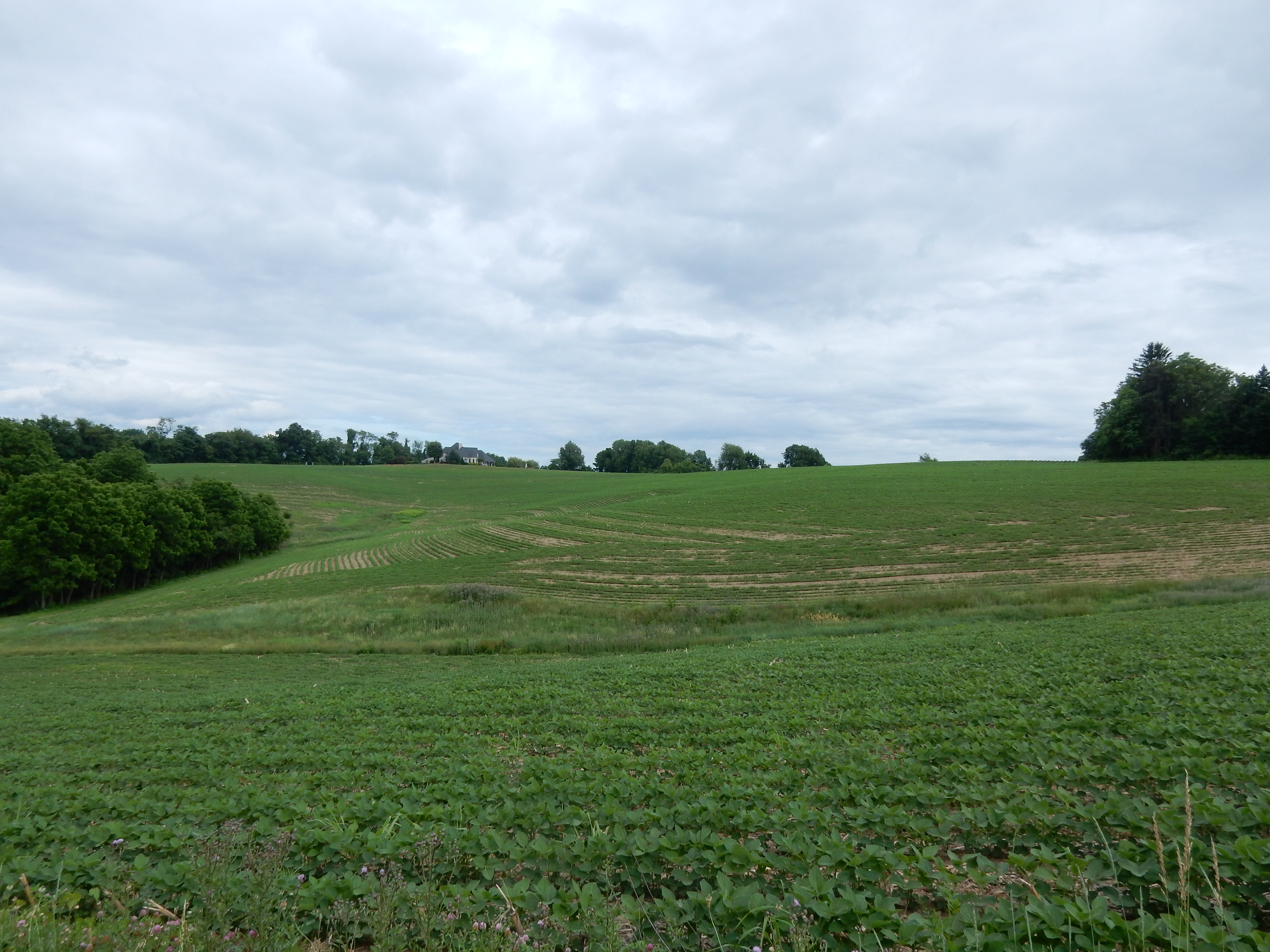
Fields near Green Valley Rd.

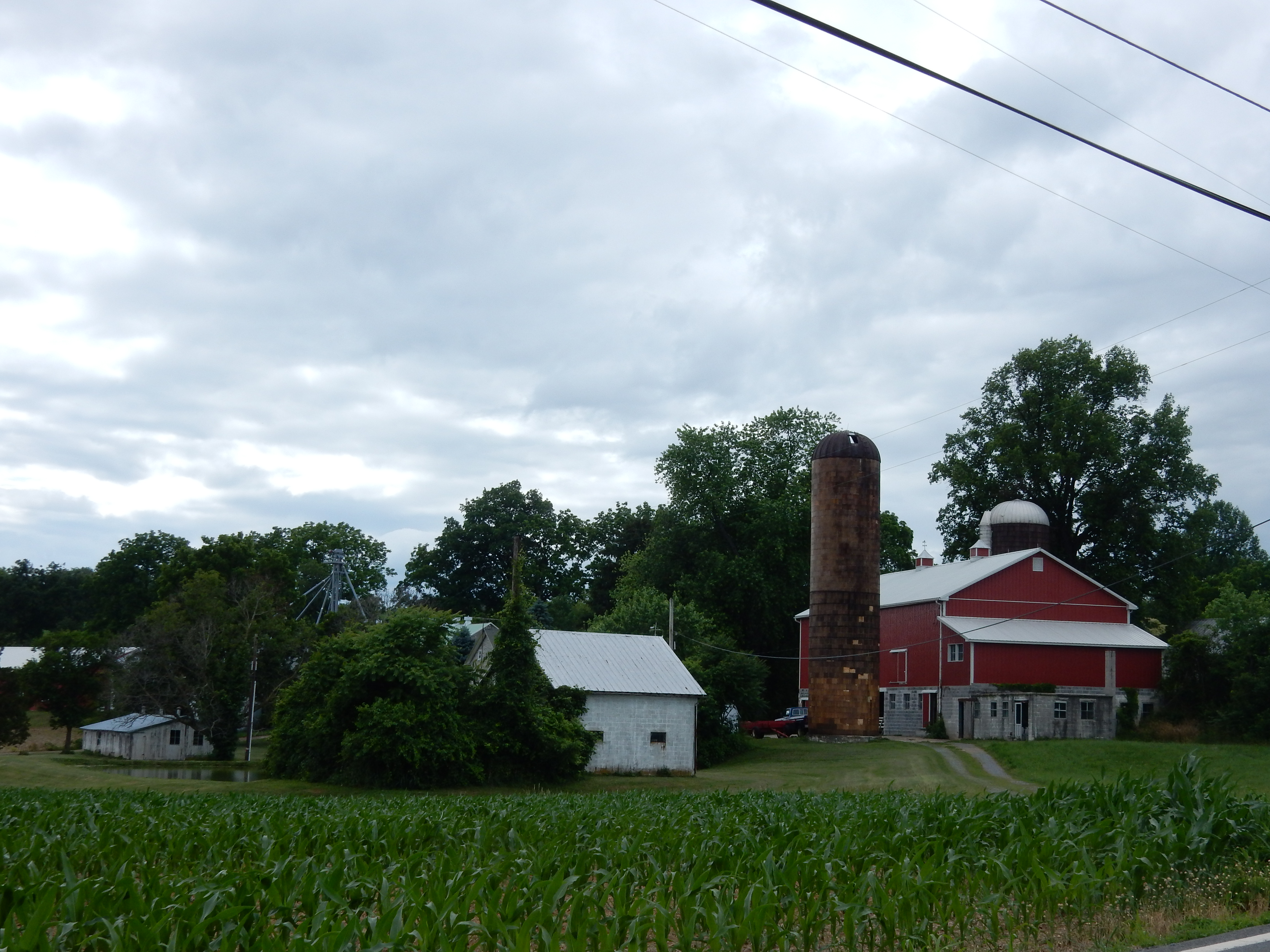
Farm on Green Valley Rd.

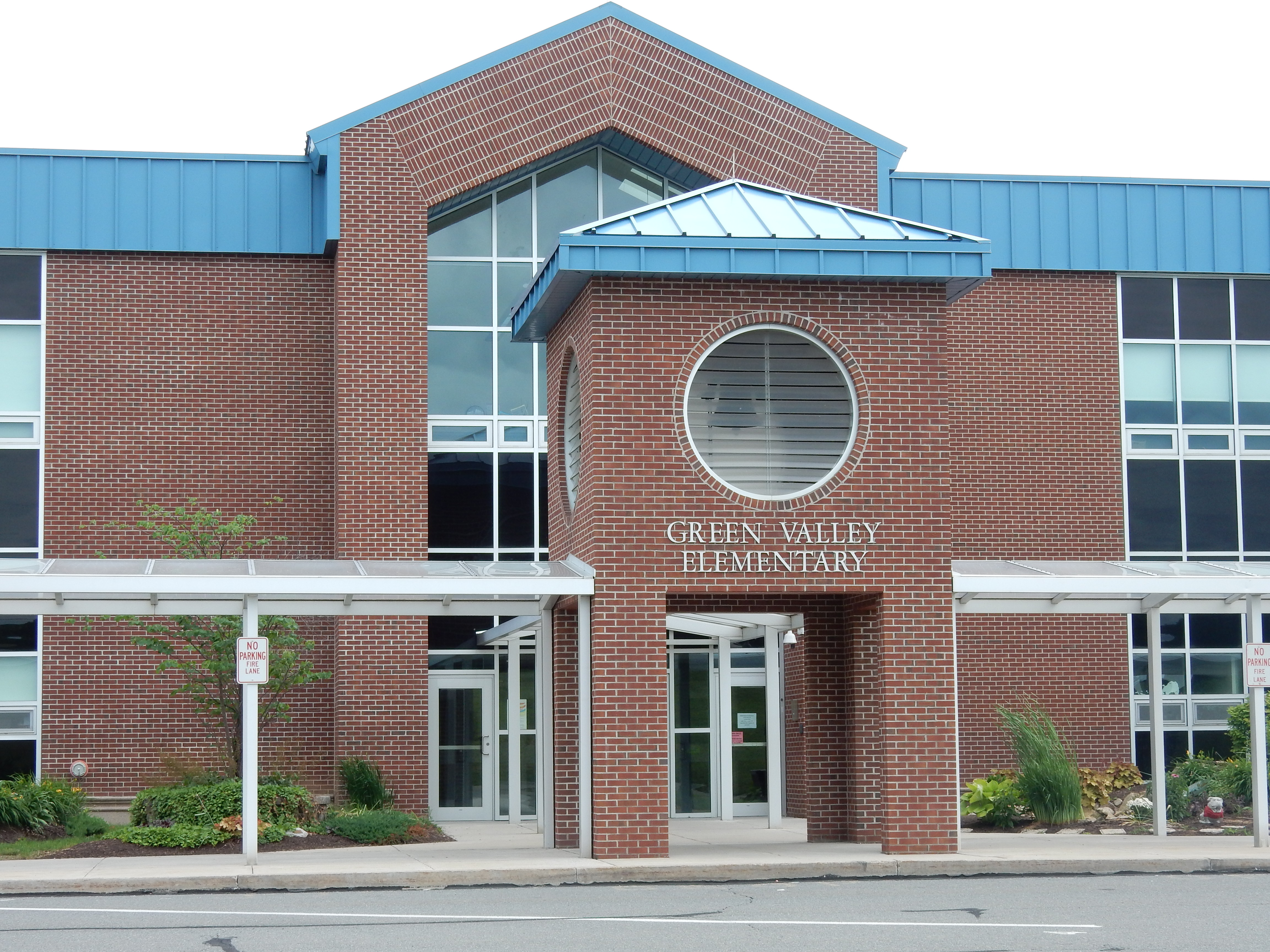
Green Valley Elementary School.
