= Penn Township, Berks County, Pennsylvania =

Township in Pennsylvania, US

Penn Township
- Township
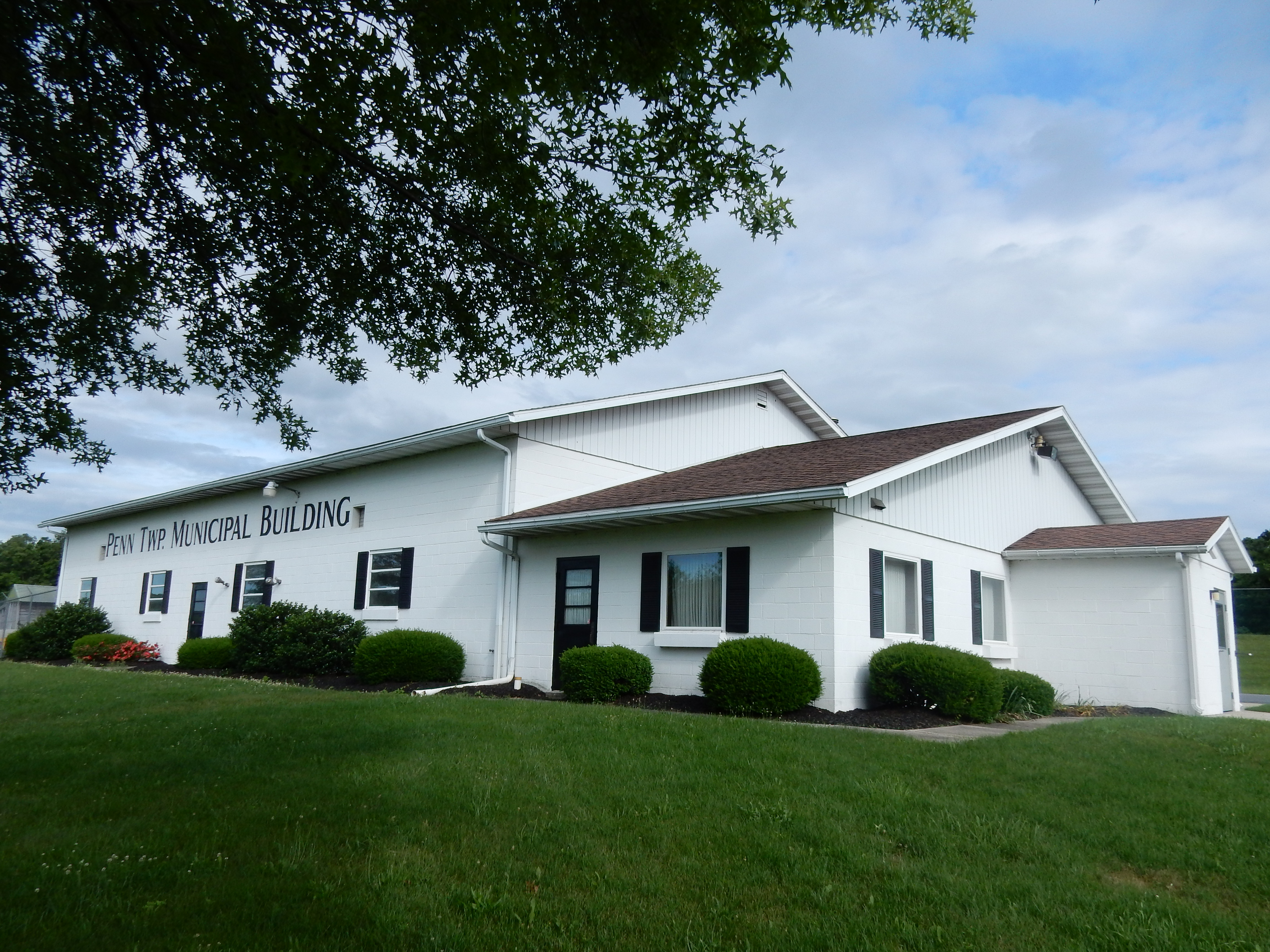
- Municipal Building. June 2015.

- Location of Penn Township in Pennsylvania Penn Township (the United States)
- Coordinates: 40°26′12″N 76°04′25″W
- Country: United States
- State: Pennsylvania
- County: Berks

Area
  - Total: 18.98 sq mi (49.15 km^{2})
  - Land: 18.48 sq mi (47.87 km^{2})
  - Water: 0.49 sq mi (1.27 km^{2})
- Elevation: 459 ft (140 m)

Population (2010)
  - Total: 1,949
  - Estimate (2016): 2,065
  - Density: 111.7/sq mi (43.13/km^{2})
- Time zone: UTC-5 (EST)
  - Summer (DST): UTC-4 (EDT)
- Area code: 610
- FIPS code: 42-011-58784
- Website: https://penntownshipberks.org/

Penn Township is a township in Berks County, Pennsylvania, United States. The population was 1,949 at the 2010 census.

== Geography ==
According to the U.S. Census Bureau, the township has a total area of 19.1 square miles (49.4 km^{2}), of which 18.6 square miles (48.1 km^{2}) is land and 0.5 square mile (1.3 km^{2}) (2.57%) is water.

Adjacent townships

- Upper Tulpehocken Township (northwest)
- Upper Bern Township (north)
- Centre Township (northeast)
- Bern Township (southeast)
- Lower Heidelberg Township (far south)
- North Heidelberg Township (southwest)
- Jefferson Township (west)

The borough of Bernville lies between Penn Township and Jefferson Township.

== Demographics ==
Historical population
| Census | Pop. | Note | %± |
|---|---|---|---|
| 1980 | 1,254 | | — |
| 1990 | 1,831 | | 46.0% |
| 2000 | 1,993 | | 8.8% |
| 2010 | 1,949 | | −2.2% |
| 2016 (est.) | 2,065 | | 6.0% |
Source: US Census Bureau

At the 2000 census, there were 1,993 people, 714 households, and 571 families living in the township. The population density was 107.3 inhabitants per square mile (41.4/km^{2}). There were 744 housing units at an average density of 40.0 per square mile (15.4/km^{2}). The racial makeup of the township was 97.39% White, 0.75% African American, 0.10% Native American, 0.50% Asian, 0.55% from other races, and 0.70% from two or more races. Hispanic or Latino of any race were 2.06%.

There were 714 households, 34.9% had children under the age of 18 living with them, 72.3% were married couples living together, 3.4% had a female householder with no husband present, and 19.9% were non-families. 16.0% of households were made up of individuals, and 7.1% were one person aged 65 or older. The average household size was 2.78 and the average family size was 3.12.

The age distribution was 25.5% under the age of 18, 6.7% from 18 to 24, 29.5% from 25 to 44, 27.4% from 45 to 64, and 10.9% 65 or older. The median age was 39 years. For every 100 females, there were 104.2 males. For every 100 females age 18 and over, there were 107.1 males.

The median household income was $55,000 and the median family income was $62,721. Males had a median income of $41,821 versus $26,010 for females. The per capita income for the township was $22,621. About 2.5% of families and 3.4% of the population were below the poverty line, including 3.9% of those under age 18 and 4.0% of those age 65 or over.

== Recreation ==
Most of the Pennsylvania State Game Lands Number 280 is located in the southwestern part of the township.

== Transportation ==
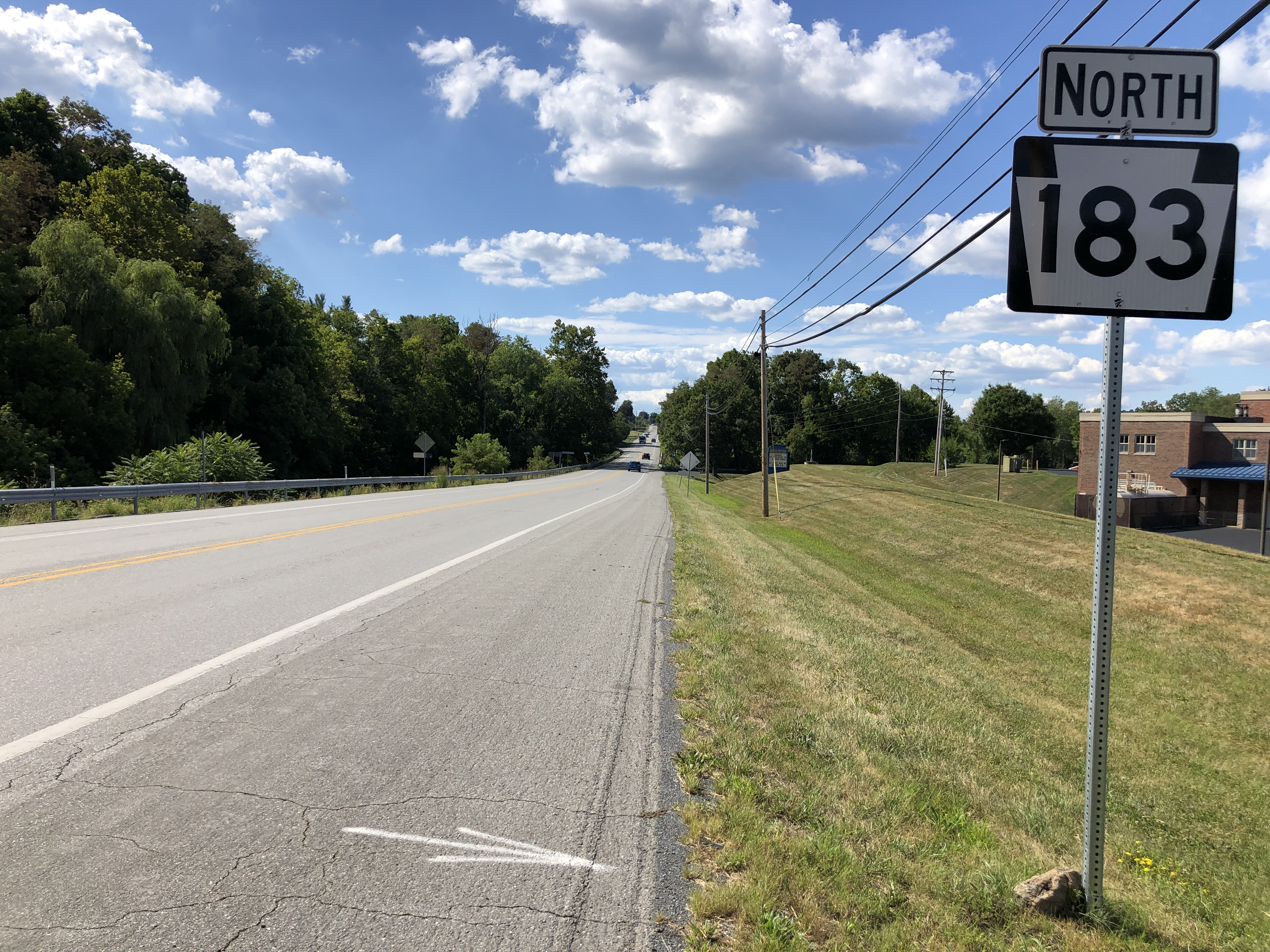
PA 183 northbound in Penn Township

As of 2020, there were 48.72 miles (78.41 km) of public roads in Penn Township, of which 14.11 miles (22.71 km) were maintained by the Pennsylvania Department of Transportation (PennDOT) and 34.61 miles (55.70 km) were maintained by the township.

Pennsylvania Route 183 is the only numbered highway serving Penn Township. It follows a northwest–southeast alignment across the western and southern portions of the township.
