= North Heidelberg Township, Pennsylvania =

Township in Pennsylvania, US

North Heidelberg Township
- Township
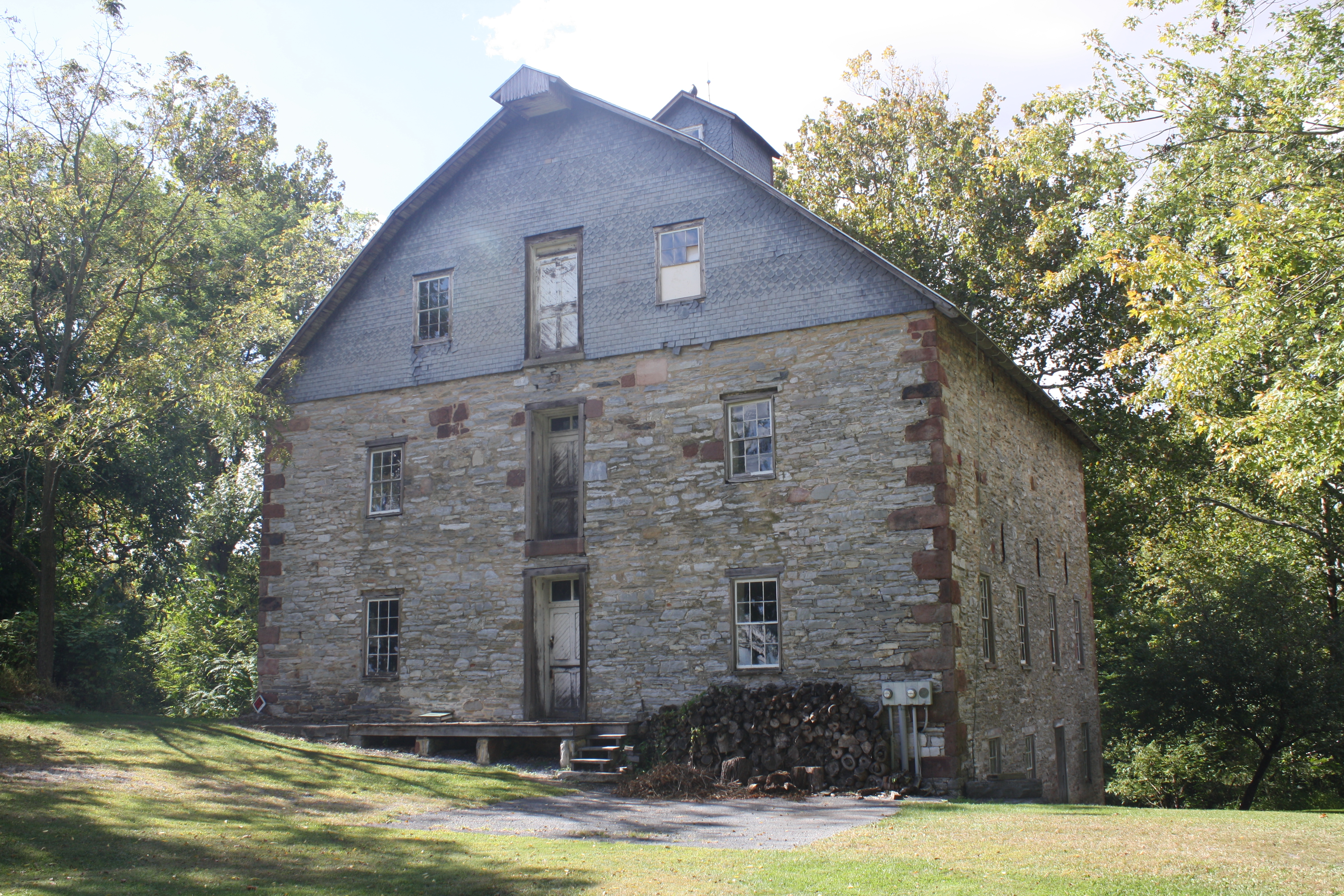
- Tulpehocken Creek Historic District

- Location of North Heidelberg Township in Pennsylvania North Heidelberg Township (the United States)
- Coordinates: 40°23′46″N 76°06′44″W
- Country: United States
- State: Pennsylvania
- County: Berks
- School District: Conrad Weiser

Area
  - Total: 13.84 sq mi (35.84 km^{2})
  - Land: 13.47 sq mi (34.88 km^{2})
  - Water: 0.37 sq mi (0.96 km^{2})
- Elevation: 459 ft (140 m)

Population (2010)
  - Total: 1,214
  - Estimate (2016): 1,226
  - Density: 91.0/sq mi (35.15/km^{2})
- Time zone: UTC-5 (EST)
  - Summer (DST): UTC-4 (EDT)
- Area code: 610
- FIPS code: 42-011-55088
- Website: https://northheidelbergtwp.org/

North Heidelberg Township is a township in Berks County, Pennsylvania, United States. The population was 1,214 at the 2010 census.

== History ==
The Stupp-Oxenrider Farm and Tulpehocken Creek Historic District are listed on the National Register of Historic Places.

== Geography ==
According to the United States Census Bureau, the township has a total area of 13.9 square miles (36.0 km^{2}), of which 13.5 square miles (34.9 km^{2}) is land and 0.4 square mile (1.1 km^{2}) (2.95%) is water.

Adjacent townships

- Jefferson Township (northwest)
- Penn Township (northeast)
- Lower Heidelberg Township (southeast)
- Heidelberg Township (south)
- Marion Township (west)

== Demographics ==
Historical population
Census	Pop.	Note	%±
1980	953		—
1990	1,288		35.2%
2000	1,325		2.9%
2010	1,214		−8.4%
2016 (est.)	1,226		1.0%
Source: US Census Bureau

At the 2000 census there were 1,325 people, 474 households, and 388 families living in the township. The population density was 98.3 inhabitants per square mile (38.0/km^{2}). There were 488 housing units at an average density of 36.2 per square mile (14.0/km^{2}). The racial makeup of the township was 98.72% White, 0.08% African American, 0.23% Asian, 0.45% from other races, and 0.53% from two or more races. Hispanic or Latino of any race were 1.36%.

There were 474 households, 34.6% had children under the age of 18 living with them, 74.3% were married couples living together, 4.6% had a female householder with no husband present, and 18.1% were non-families. 13.7% of households were made up of individuals, and 5.1% were one person aged 65 or older. The average household size was 2.80 and the average family size was 3.09.

The age distribution was 25.4% under the age of 18, 5.9% from 18 to 24, 26.6% from 25 to 44, 31.5% from 45 to 64, and 10.5% 65 or older. The median age was 41 years. For every 100 females, there were 104.2 males. For every 100 females age 18 and over, there were 104.6 males.

The median household income was $56,648 and the median family income was $62,727. Males had a median income of $41,667 versus $28,077 for females. The per capita income for the township was $25,334. About 0.5% of families and 1.7% of the population were below the poverty line, including 1.2% of those under age 18 and 5.5% of those age 65 or over.

== Transportation ==
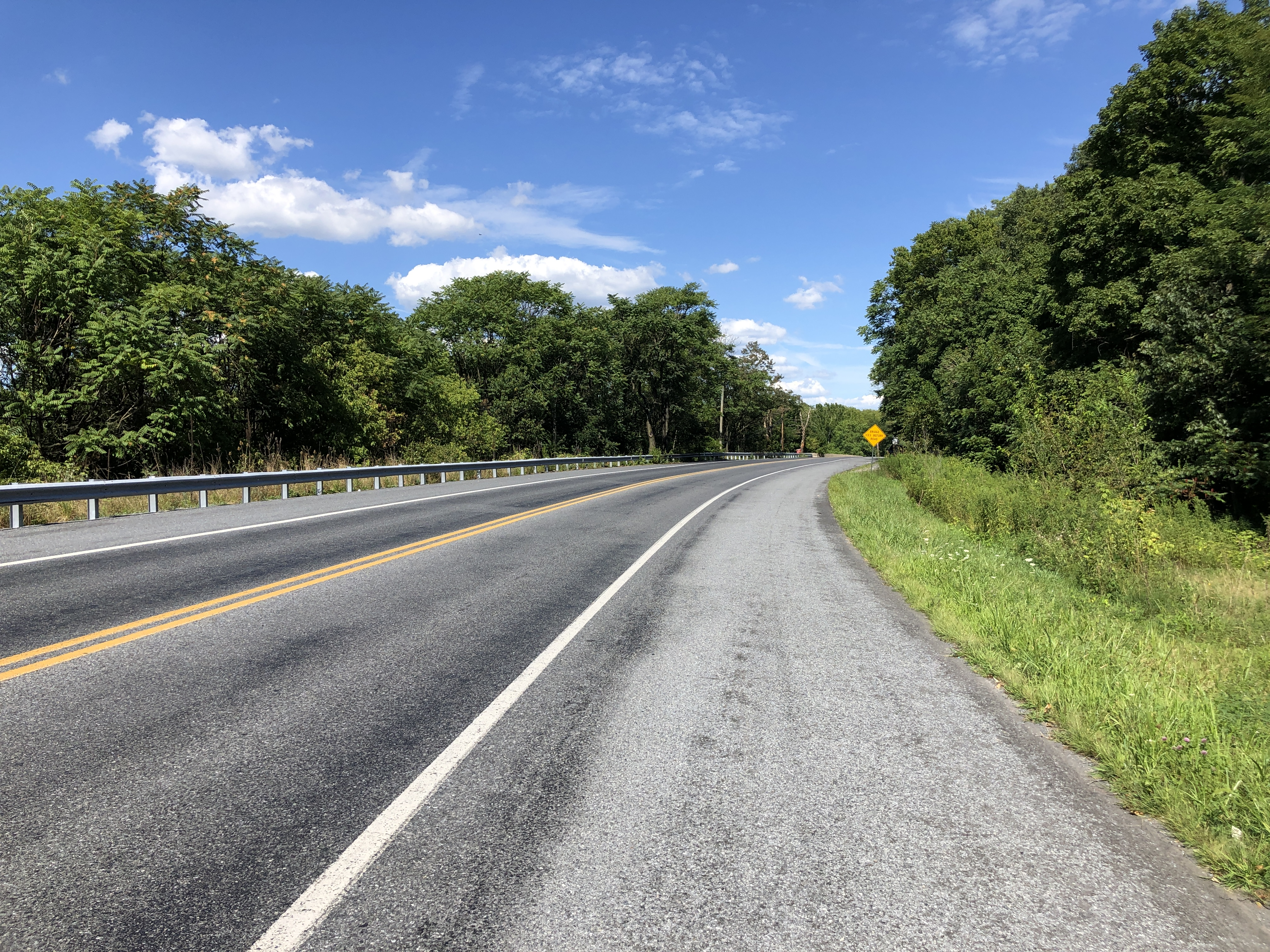
North Heidelberg Road in North Heidelberg Township

As of 2020, there were 39.97 miles (64.33 km) of public roads in North Heidelberg Township, of which 12.40 miles (19.96 km) were maintained by the Pennsylvania Department of Transportation (PennDOT) and 27.57 miles (44.37 km) were maintained by the township.

No numbered highways pass through North Heidelberg Township. Main thoroughfares serving the township include Brownsville Road, Charming Forge Road, Christmas Village Road, North Heidelberg Road and Old Church Road.

== Gallery ==
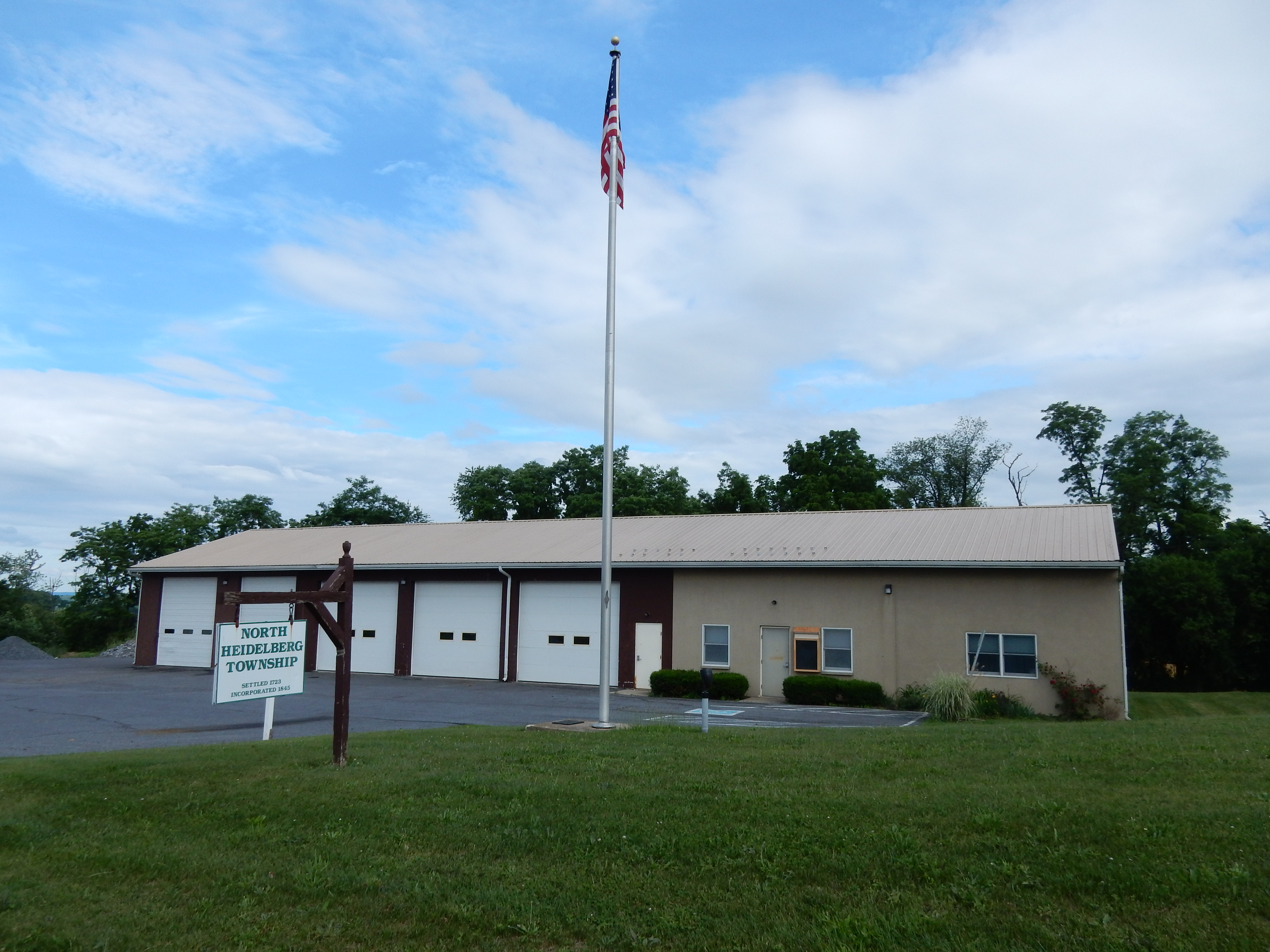
North Heidelberg Twp Office.

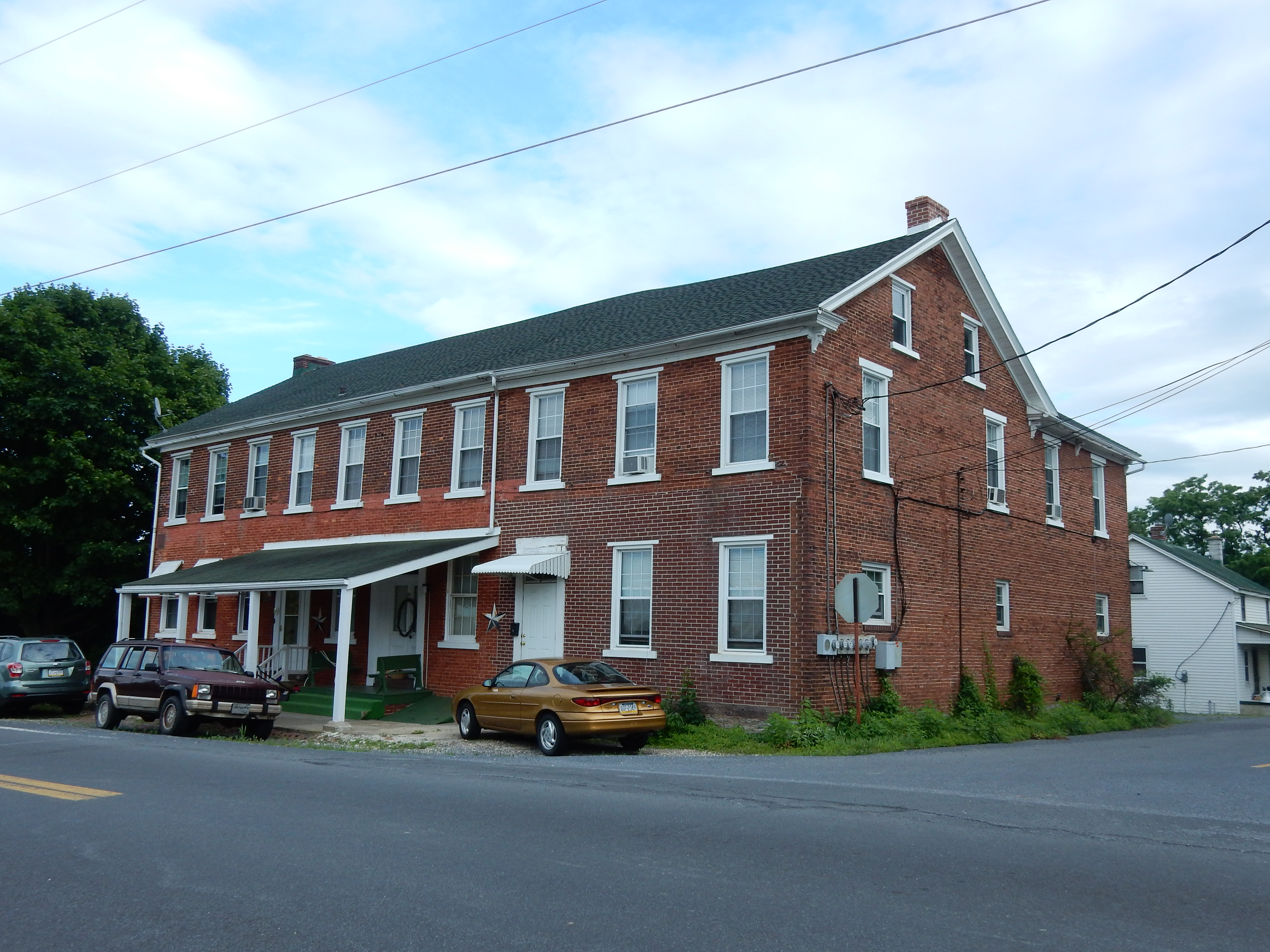
Breyer's Luncheon.

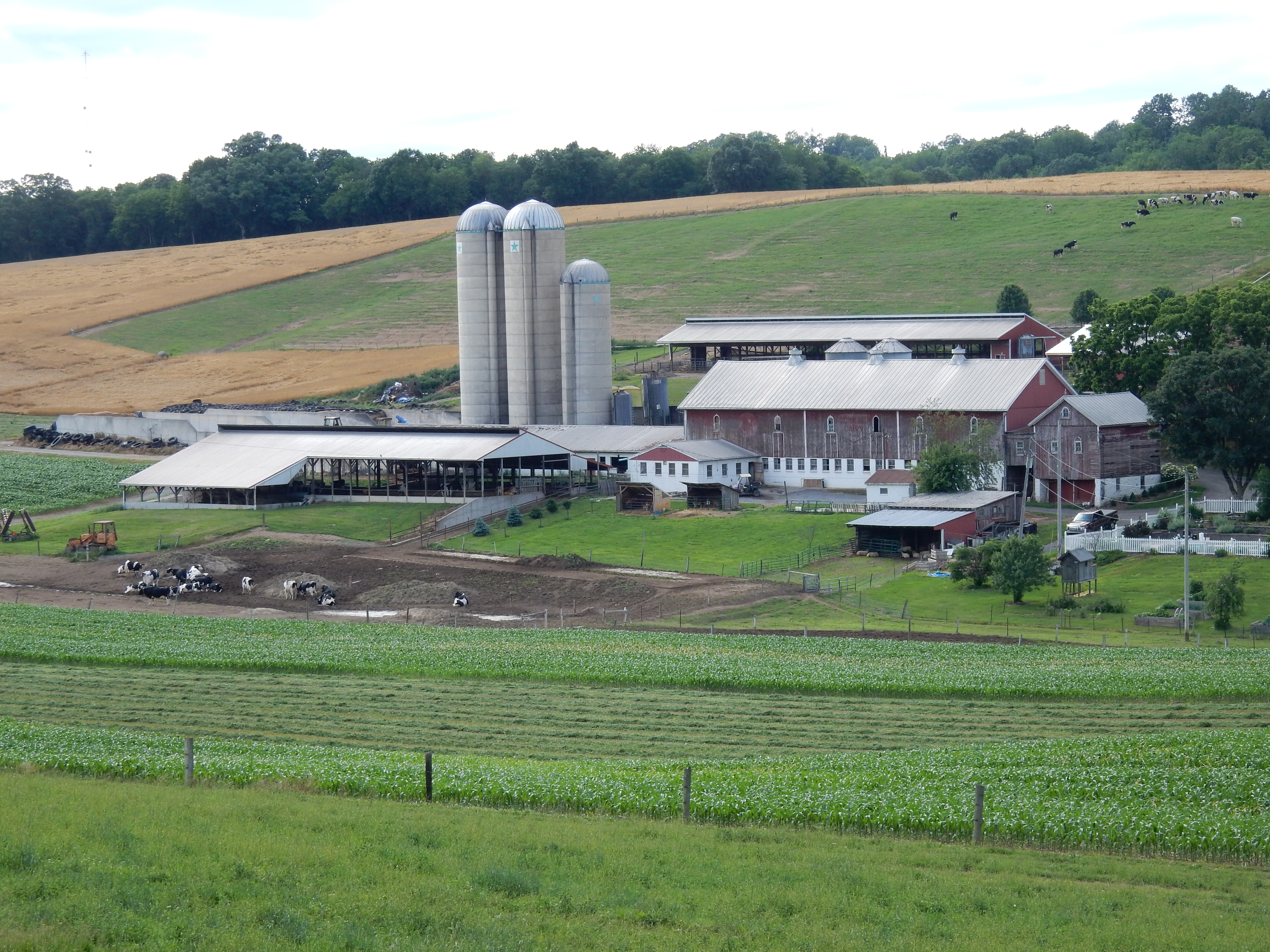
Farm on Charming Forge Rd.

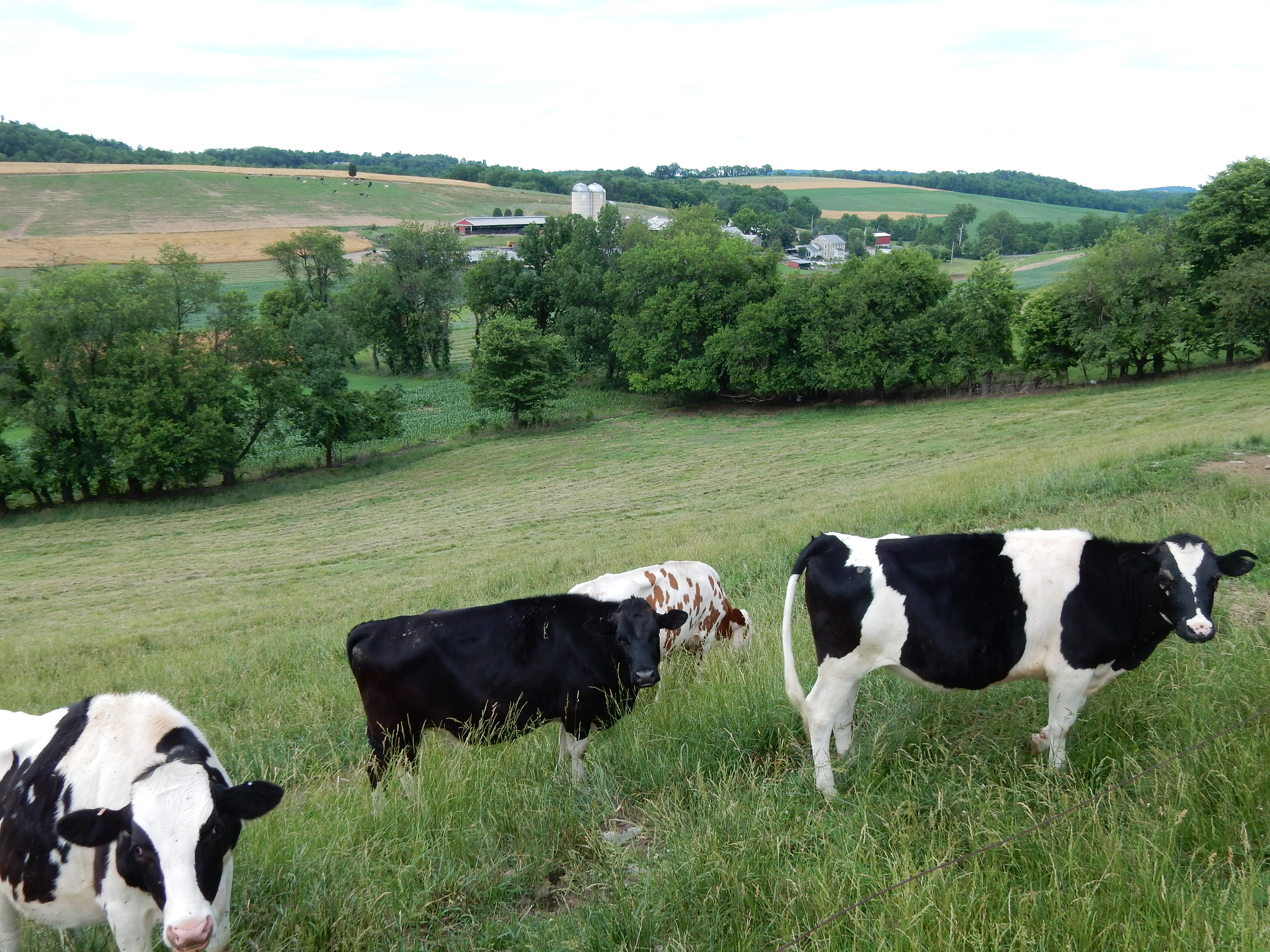
North Heidelberg Pasture.
