= Eshbach, Pennsylvania =

Unincorporated community in Pennsylvania, US

- Unincorporated community
- Location within Pennsylvania
- Coordinates: 40°23′6″N 75°37′12″W
- Country: United States
- State: Pennsylvania
- County: Berks
- Township: Washington
- Elevation: 456 ft (139 m)
- Time zone: UTC-5 (Eastern (EST))
  - Summer (DST): UTC-4 (EDT)
- Area codes: 610 and 484
- GNIS feature ID: 1174317

Eshbach is an unincorporated community in Washington Township in Berks County, Pennsylvania, United States. Eshbach is located at the intersection of Old Route 100 and Stauffer Road.

The village sits at the foot of the Oley Hills and was established when the Colebrookdale Railroad ran through the village from Pottstown to Barto. The railroad was taken out in the 1950s and only goes from Pottstown to Boyertown. Some near by towns include Bechtelsville, Bally, New Berlinville, and Boyertown

Some businesses in Eshbach include Carriage House Trailer Sales and Service and Rota-Cyl Corporation.
