= Seisholtzville, Pennsylvania =

Village in Pennsylvania, U.S.

- Unincorporated village
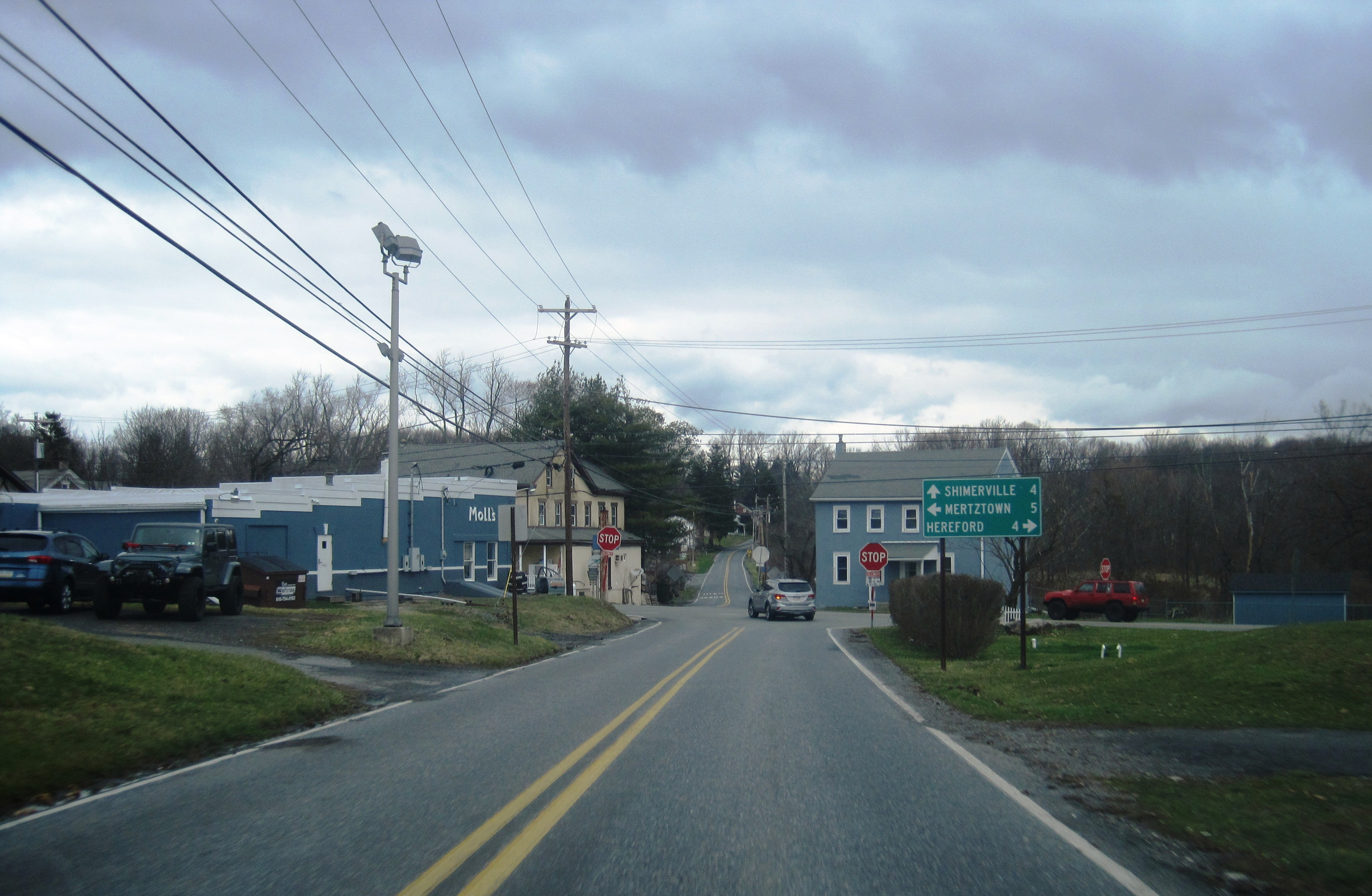
- Seisholtzville along northbound Hunter Forge Road
- Interactive map of Seisholtzville, Pennsylvania
- Coordinates: 40°28′11.35″N 75°36′14.67″W
- Country: United States
- State: Pennsylvania
- County: Berks
- Townships: Hereford and Longswamp
- Elevation: 853 ft (260 m)
- Time zone: EST (UTC−05:00)
  - Summer (DST): EDT (UTC−04:00)
- ZIP Code: 18062
- Area code(s): 610 and 484
- GNIS feature ID: 1204607

Seisholtzville is a village that is primarily located in Hereford Township, Pennsylvania, with a portion of the village located in Longswamp Township.

It uses the Macungie Zip Code of 18062. The area code is 610 and it is served by the Bally telephone exchange.

== History ==
The correct pronunciation of this village's name is "SEE-sholtz-vil," although the pronunciation of "SEE-sawz-vil" is also heard. The village was named after a former hotel keeper at this place.

"Süssholtz," "Süssholz," and "Süßholz," which is pronounced as "sees-holtz" in Pennsylvania German and means "sweet"-"wood," were German surnames that were common to this region of Pennsylvania at the time of this village's founding. In English spelling, those surnames became "Seesholtz," "Seasholtz," "Seisholtz," or "Seasholes." These surnames and their variants may have been derived from the German word for liquorice.

The first public place opened in this village circa 1800. A post office was subsequently established in 1849.

== Geography ==
Seisholtzville is located on the crest of South Mountain, and the Perkiomen Creek also begins here.
