= Huffs Church, Pennsylvania =

Village in Pennsylvania, U.S.

Coordinates: 40°26′48″N 75°37′09″W

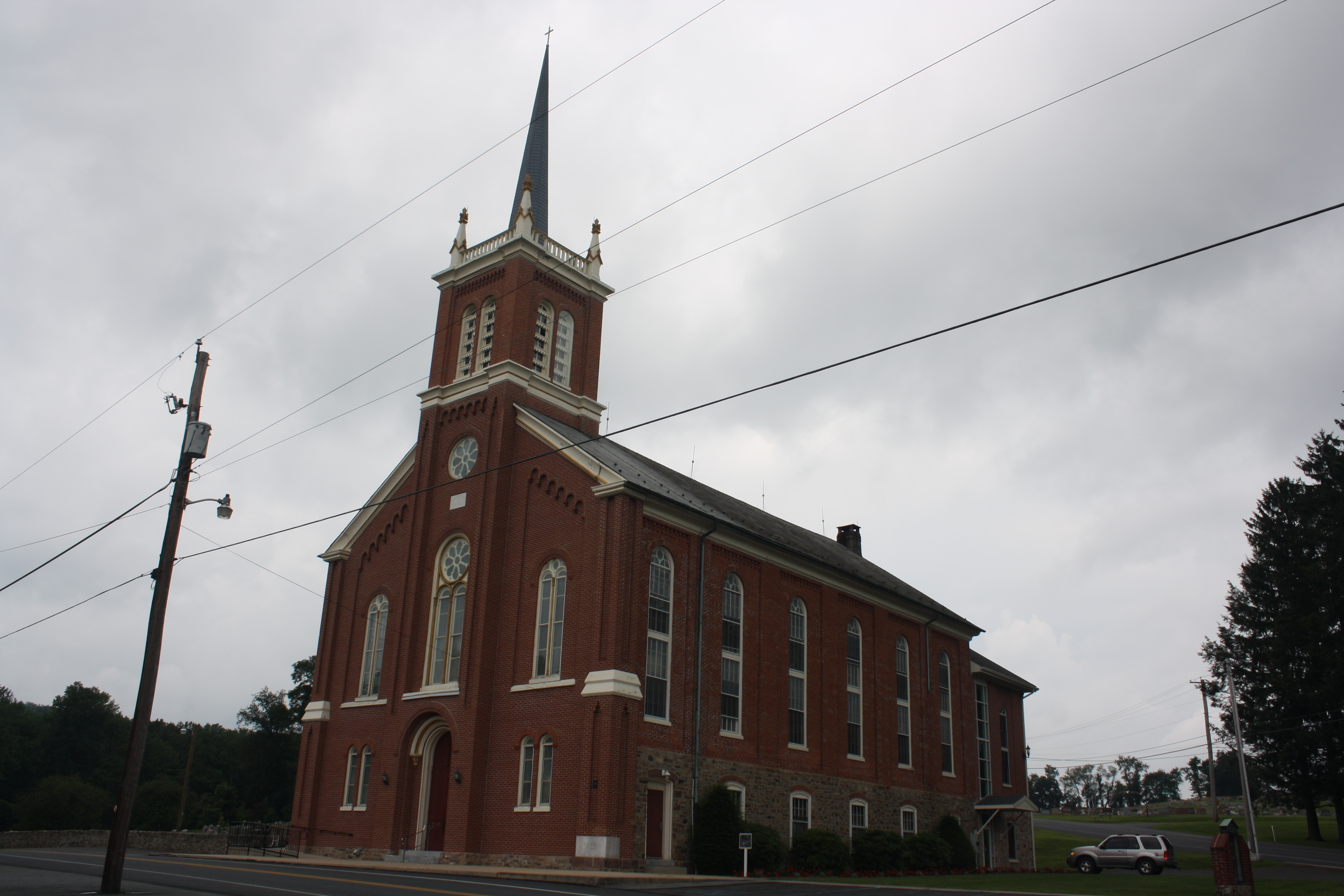
Huff's Union Church

Huffs Church is a village in western Hereford Township, Berks County, Pennsylvania, United States. The West Branch Perkiomen Creek flows southeastward through the village to join the Perkiomen Creek in the Green Lane Reservoir. It is split between the Alburtis zip code of 18011 and that of the Barto zip code of 19504.

== History ==
During the 1810s, the Reformed and Lutheran congregations built the Hereford Church on land purchased from Frederick Huff. It was soon renamed Hereford-Huff's Church. The church was replaced in the 1880s with the current Huff's Union Church building.
