= Hereford, Pennsylvania =

Unincorporated community in Pennsylvania, US

- Census-designated place
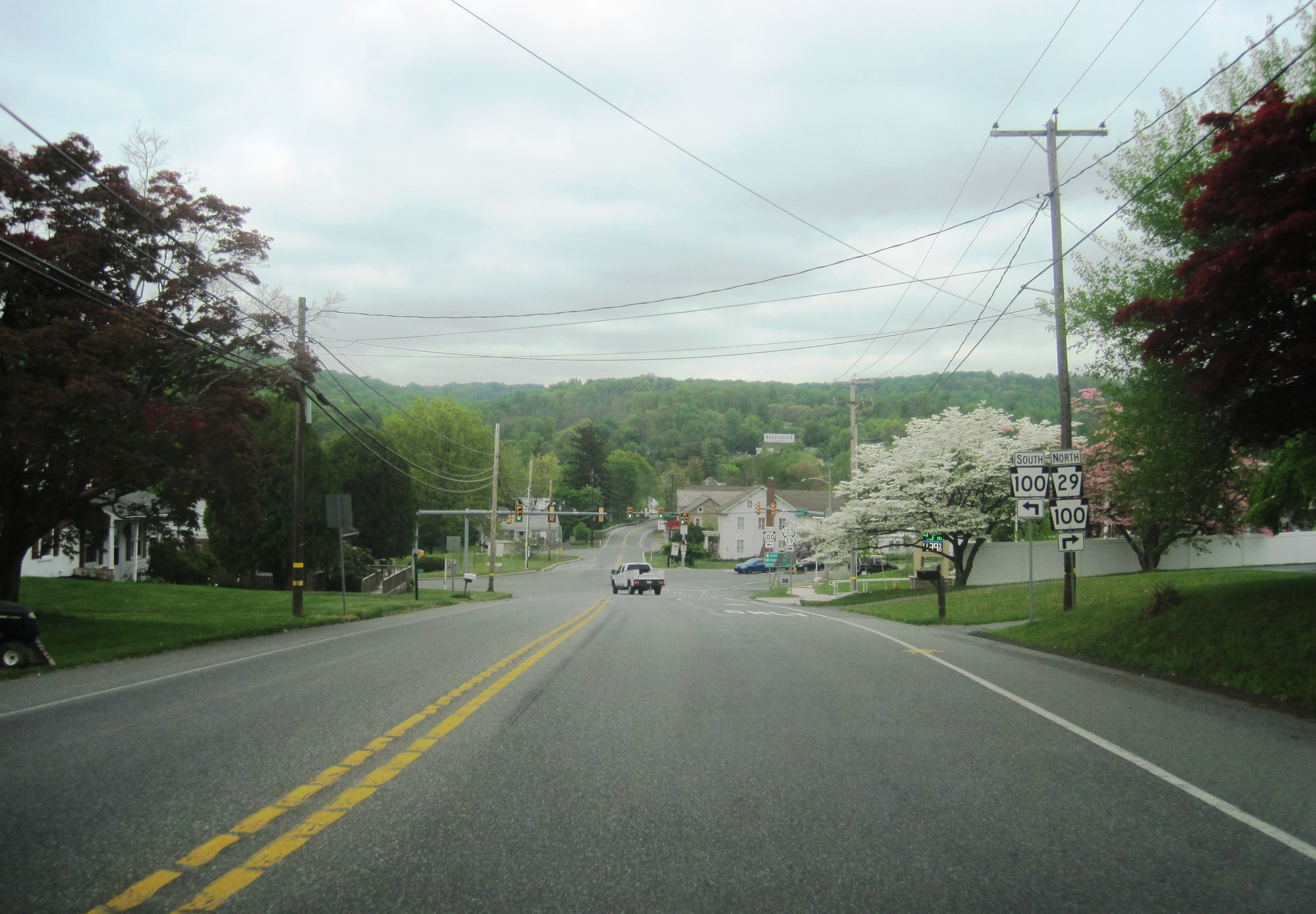
- Northbound PA 29 approaching PA 100 in Hereford

- Location within Pennsylvania Location within the United States
- Coordinates: 40°26′57″N 75°33′08″W
- Country: United States
- State: Pennsylvania
- County: Berks
- Township: Hereford

Area
  - Total: 0.99 sq mi (2.57 km^{2})
  - Land: 0.99 sq mi (2.56 km^{2})
  - Water: 0.0039 sq mi (0.01 km^{2})

Population (2020)
  - Total: 933
  - Density: 942.5/sq mi (363.89/km^{2})
- Time zone: UTC-5 (Eastern (EST))
  - Summer (DST): UTC-4 (EDT)
- ZIP codes: 18056
- Area codes: 215, 267 and 445
- FIPS code: 42-34008

Hereford is a census-designated place that is located in Hereford Township, Berks County, Pennsylvania, United States.

== History ==
A post office called Hereford was in operation from 1830 to 2019. The community took its name from Hereford Township. It was previously known as Treichlersville.

At the end of March 2019 the post office closed on very short notice because the owner refused to renew the lease. The post office has since moved from the same building as Turkey Hill to the fire station building.

== Geography ==
This community lies at the intersection of Pennsylvania Routes 29 and 100, which connect it to East Greenville and to Pottstown, respectively to the south. These routes continue north on Chestnut Street to Shimerville in Lehigh County, where 29 continues toward Allentown.

The Perkiomen Creek flows southward through Hereford to the Schuylkill River.

== Demographics ==
At the time of the 2020 census, the population was 933.
