= Hunter's Mill Complex =

- U.S. National Register of Historic Places
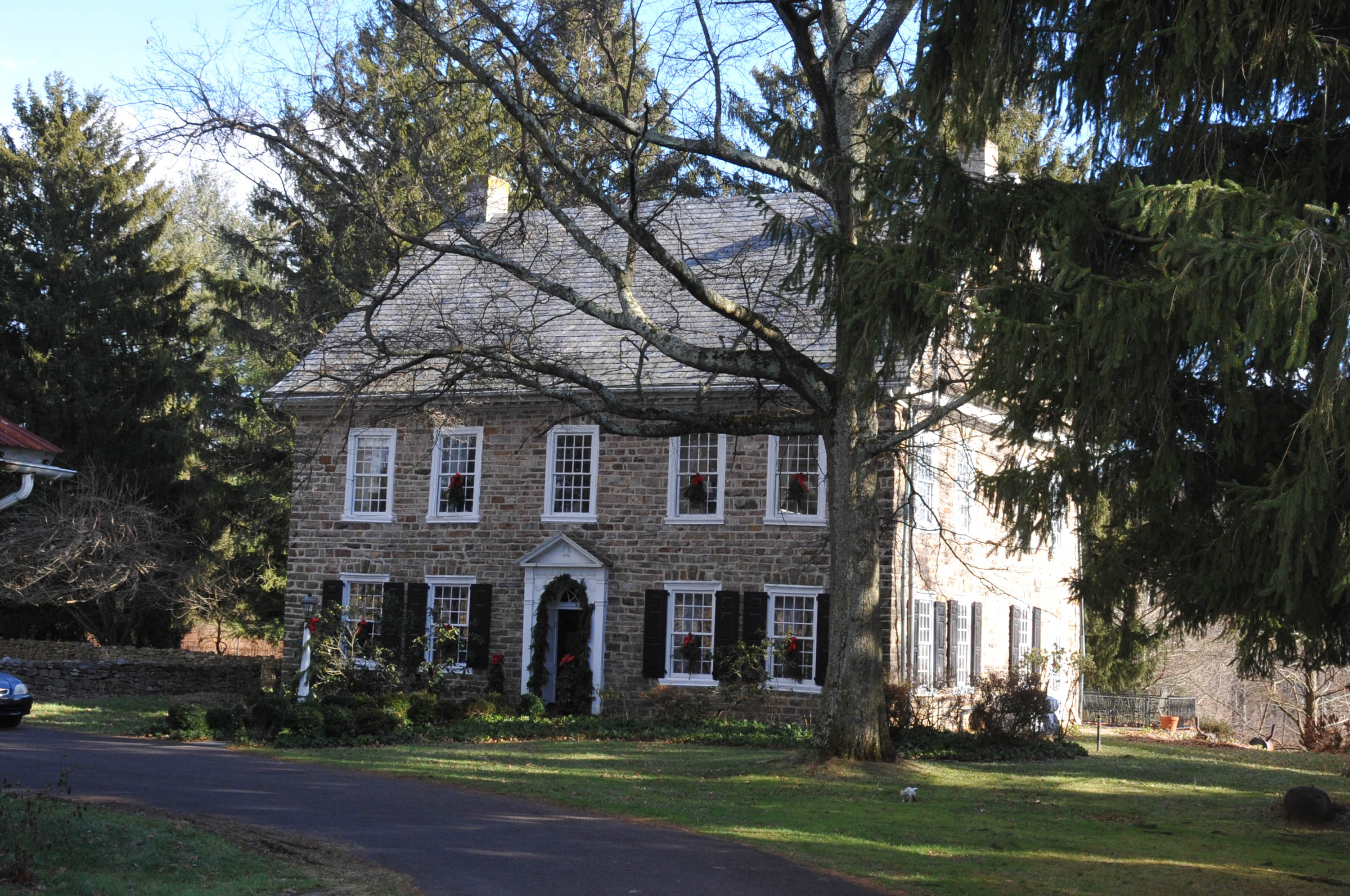
- House

- Location within Pennsylvania Location within the United States
- Location: Forgedale Road, Hereford Township, Pennsylvania
- Coordinates: 40°25′41″N 75°37′15″W
- Area: 11 acres (4.5 ha)
- Built: 1792-1793, 1794
- Architectural style: Georgian, Federal
- NRHP reference No.: 88003045
- Added to NRHP: December 22, 1988

The Hunter's Mill Complex, also known as Rush's Mill, is an historic grist mill complex which is located on a rise above Perkiomen Creek in Hereford Township, Berks County, Pennsylvania.

It was listed on the National Register of Historic Places in 1988.

== History and architectural features ==
The complex consists of a three-story mill that built roughly between 1792 and 1793, a two-and-one-half-story, five-bay, Federal-style, stone dwelling that was built in 1794, a mid-nineteenth century, stone and frame, Pennsylvania bank barn, two one-and-one-half-story stone summer kitchens, and a late eighteenth-century stone walled garden. The mill measures forty-five feet by thirty-six feet. The house has a Georgian floor plan and measures forty-five feet by forty-five feet.

== Gallery ==
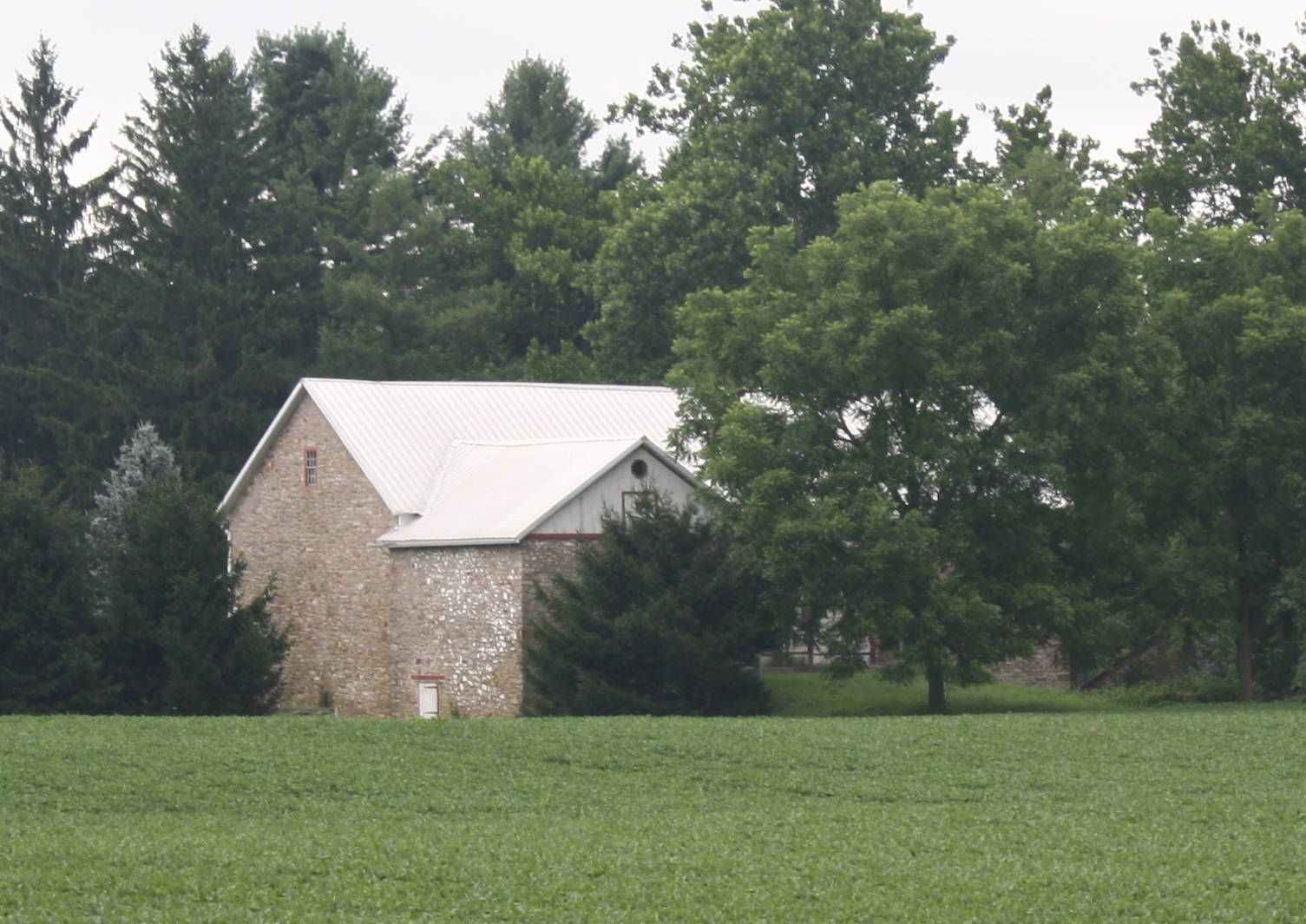
Barn from Forgedale Road

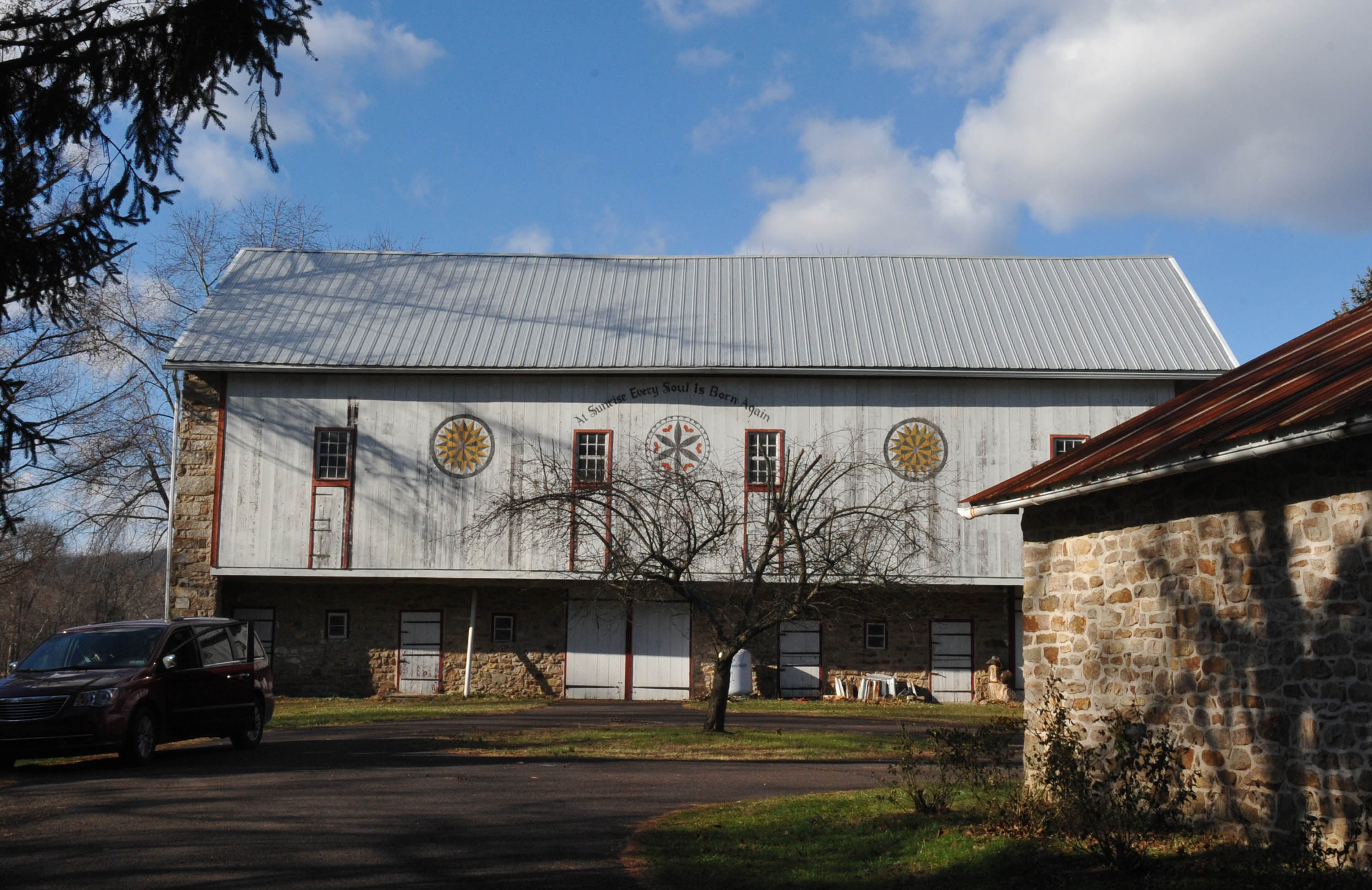
Front of barn

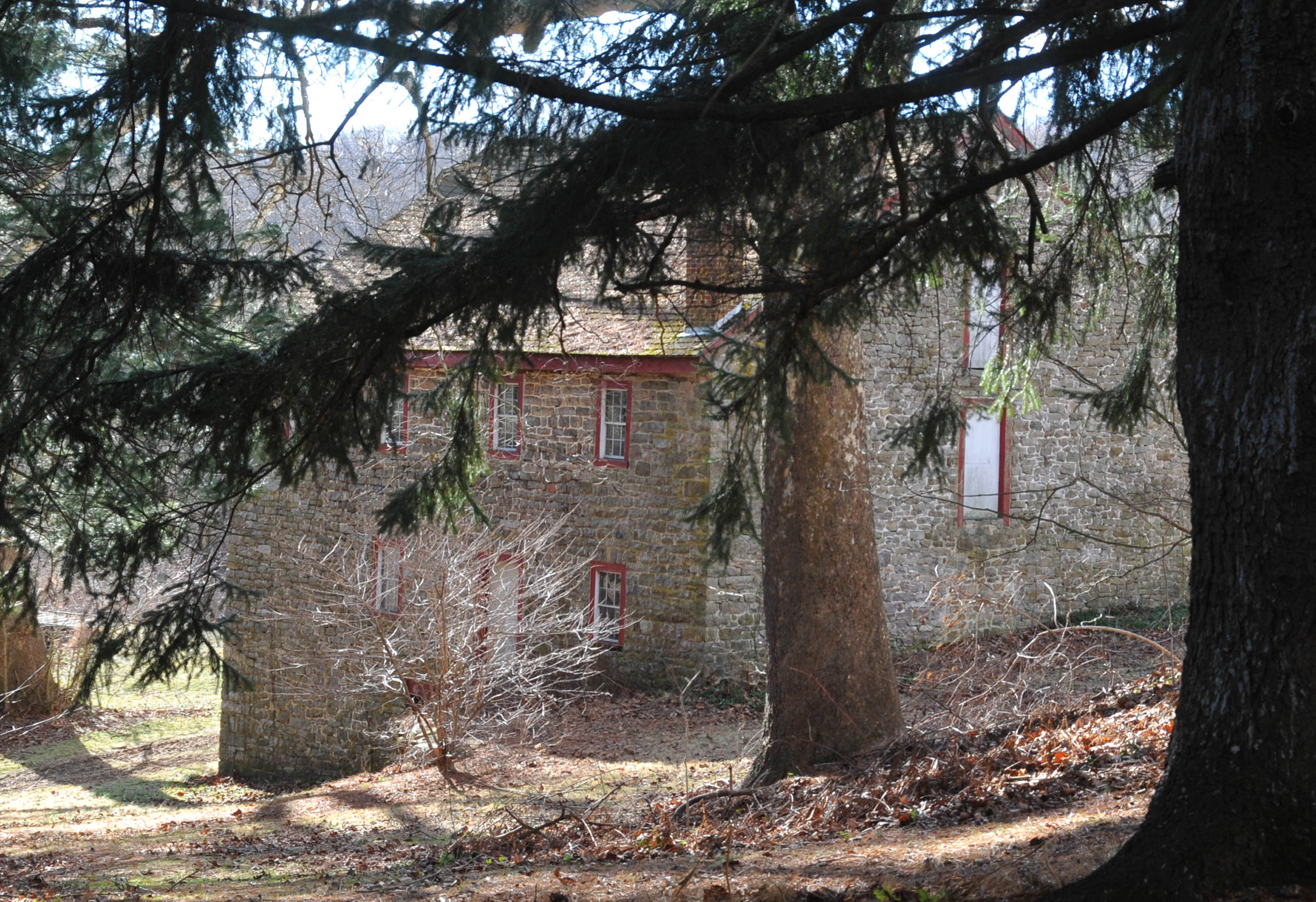
Mill
