= Boyertown Area School District =

School district in southeastern Pennsylvania, U.S.

Coordinates: 40.337895°N 75.627202°W

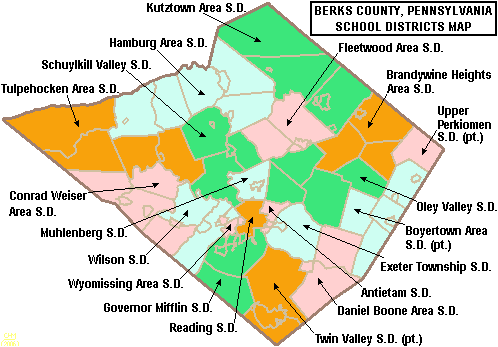

Address
- 911 Montgomery Avenue Boyertown, Berks County, Montgomery County, Pennsylvania, 19512; United States

District information
- Type: Public
- Motto: "To enable all students to succeed in a changing world!"
- Established: 1953

Students and staff
- District mascot: Bears

Other information
- Website: www.boyertownasd.org

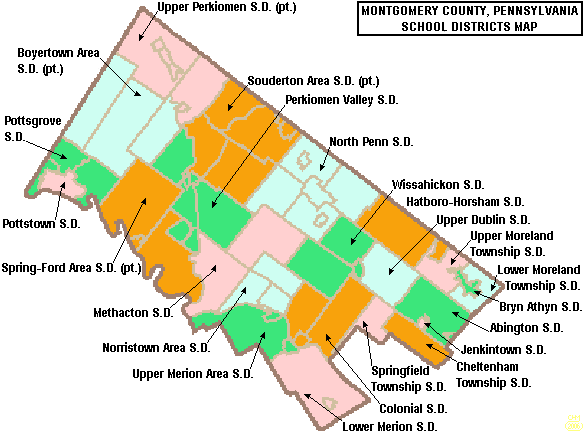
Boyertown Area School District region in Montgomery County

The Boyertown Area School District is a large public school district which covers portions of Berks and Montgomery Counties in southeastern Pennsylvania. When the Boyertown Area School District was formed in 1953 it was one of the largest in the state, encompassing 100 square miles (260 km^{2}). In Berks County it covers the Boroughs of Bally, Bechtelsville and Boyertown and Colebrookdale Township, Douglass Township, Earl Township and Washington Township. In Montgomery County it covers Douglass Township, New Hanover Township and Upper Frederick Township.

According to 2006 local census data, Boyertown Area School District serves a resident population of 34,803. In 2009, the district residents’ per capita income was $22,792, while the median family income was $61,247. In the Commonwealth, the median family income was $49,501 and the United States median family income was $49,445, in 2010.

== Schools ==
The district operates six Elementary Schools, two Middle Schools (6th-8th) and one Senior High School (9th-12th).

Elementary schools

- Boyertown Elementary School
- Colebrookdale Elementary School
- Earl Elementary School
- Gilbertsville Elementary School
- New Hanover-Upper Frederick Elementary School
- Washington Elementary School

Secondary schools

- Boyertown Area Middle School-East Center
- Boyertown Area Middle School-West Center
- Boyertown Area Senior High School

== Extracurriculars ==
The district offers a variety of clubs, activities and sports.

=== Sports ===
The district funds:

Boys

- Baseball - AAAA
- Basketball- AAAA
- Cross Country - AAA
- Football - AAAA
- Golf - AAA
- Indoor Track and Field - AAAA
- Lacrosse - AAAA
- Soccer - AAA
- Swimming and Diving - AAA
- Tennis - AAA
- Track and Field - AAA
- Wrestling - AAA

Girls

- Basketball - AAAA
- Cross Country - AAA
- Indoor Track and Field - AAAA
- Field Hockey - AAA
- Lacrosse - AAAA
- Soccer (Fall) - AAA
- Softball - AAAA
- Swimming and Diving - AAA
- Girls' Tennis - AAA
- Track and Field - AAA

Junior High School Sports

Boys

- Baseball
- Basketball
- Football
- Soccer
- Track and Field
- Wrestling

Girls

- Baseball
- Field Hockey
- Lacrosse
- Soccer (Fall)
- Softball
- Track and Field

According to PIAA directory July 2012
