= Harlem, Pennsylvania =

Village in Berks County, Pennsylvania, US

Coordinates: 40°27′29″N 75°35′15″W

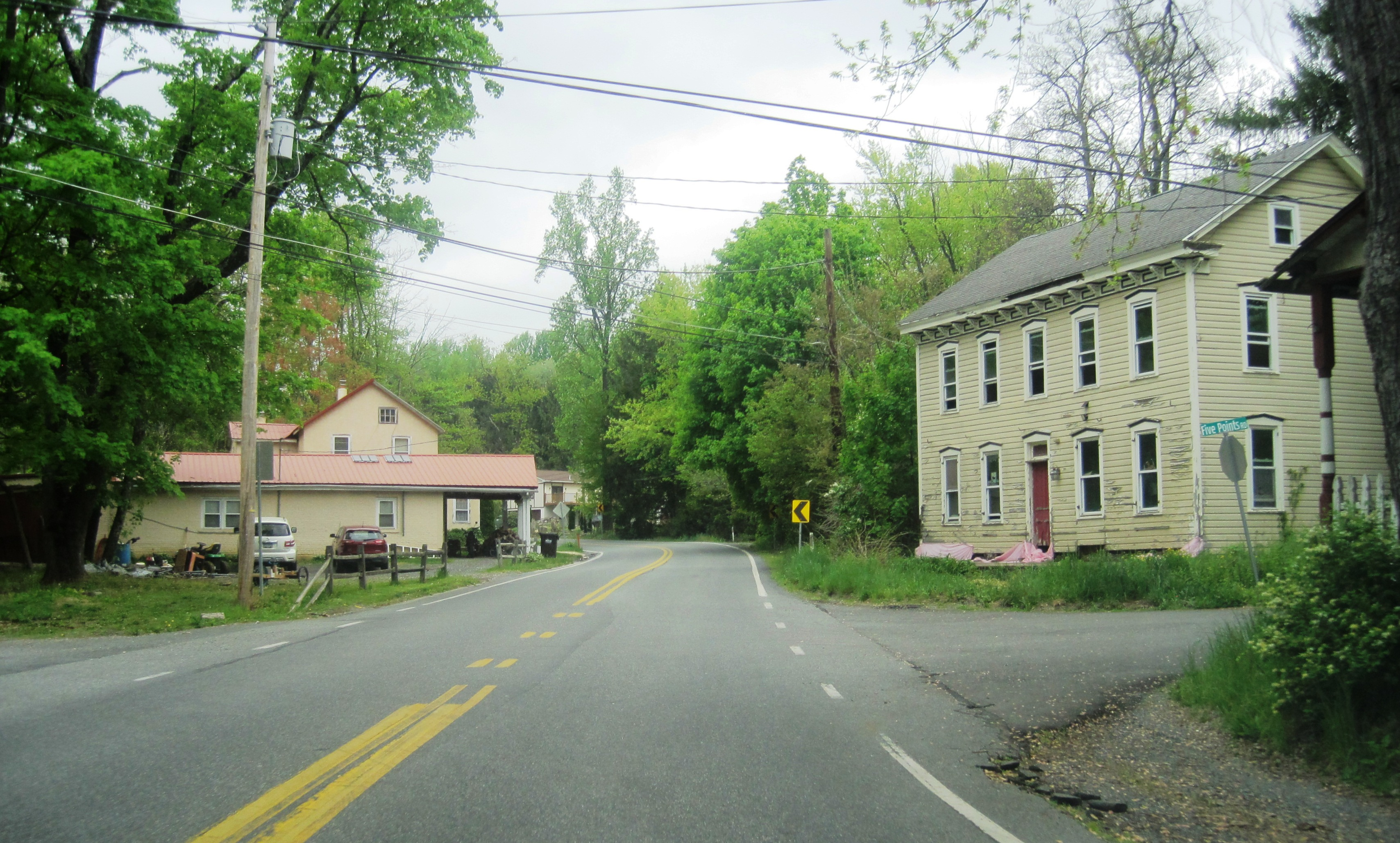
Harlem along Seisholtzville Road

Harlem is a village in Hereford Township, Berks County, Pennsylvania, United States. It is located one mile southeast of Seisholtzville, in a valley near the headwaters of the Perkiomen Creek. The village is split between the zip codes of Barto and Macungie, which are 19504 and 18062, respectively. The township municipal building is located in Harlem at the physical address of 3131 Seisholtzville Road, Macungie, while the building's mailing address is PO Box 225, Hereford.
