= Barto Bridge =

- U.S. National Register of Historic Places
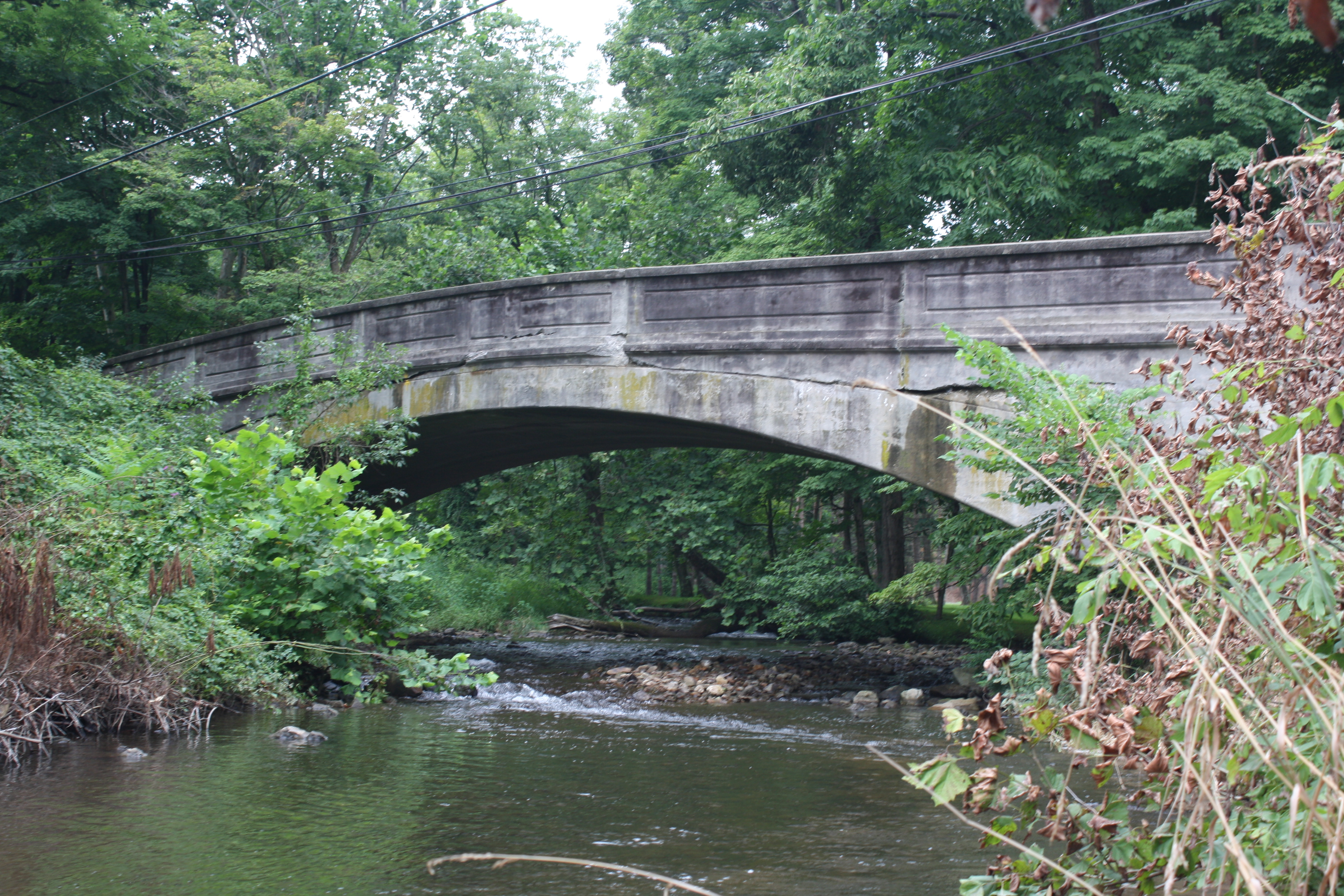
- Barto Bridge. July 2013.

- Location within Pennsylvania Location within the United States
- Location: Legislative Route 284 over a tributary of Perkiomen Creek near Bally, Washington Township, Pennsylvania
- Coordinates: 40°23′46″N 75°36′31″W
- Area: less than one acre
- Built: 1908
- Built by: N.M. Davis; Willauer & Co.
- Architectural style: Single span barrel arch
- MPS: Highway Bridges Owned by the Commonwealth of Pennsylvania, Department of Transportation TR
- NRHP reference No.: 88000790
- Added to NRHP: June 22, 1988

Barto Bridge is a historic concrete arch bridge located at Washington Township in Berks County, Pennsylvania. It is a single span 82-foot-long (25 m), concrete barrel arch bridge, constructed in 1908. It crosses a tributary of Perkiomen Creek.

It was listed on the National Register of Historic Places in 1988.
