= Barto, Pennsylvania =

Unincorporated community in Pennsylvania, US

- Unincorporated community
- Location within Pennsylvania Location within the United States
- Coordinates: 40°23′28″N 75°36′37″W
- Country: United States
- State: Pennsylvania
- County: Berks
- Township: Washington
- Time zone: UTC-5 (Eastern (EST))
  - Summer (DST): UTC-4 (EDT)
- ZIP code: 19504
- Area codes: 610 & 484
- GNIS feature ID: 1203026

Barto is an unincorporated community situated between the boroughs of Bally and Bechtelsville in Washington Township, Berks County, Pennsylvania, United States. Barto is part of the Philadelphia metropolitan area, located near the border with Montgomery County. Its Zip Code is 19504 and the West Branch Perkiomen Creek flows southeast through it to join the Perkiomen Creek in the Green Lane Reservoir.
