= Dale, Berks County, Pennsylvania =

Unincorporated community in Pennsylvania, US

Dale, Pennsylvania
- Unincorporated community
- Location within Pennsylvania
- Coordinates: 40°24′58″N 75°36′57″W
- Country: United States
- State: Pennsylvania
- County: Berks
- Township: Washington
- Elevation: 568 ft (173 m)
- Time zone: UTC-5 (Eastern (EST))
  - Summer (DST): UTC-4 (EDT)
- Area codes: 610 and 484
- GNIS feature ID: 1203387

Dale is an unincorporated community in Washington Township in Berks County, Pennsylvania, United States. Dale is located at the intersection of Forgedale, Crow Hill, and Dale Roads.
