= Clayton, Pennsylvania =

Unincorporated community in Pennsylvania, US

- Unincorporated community
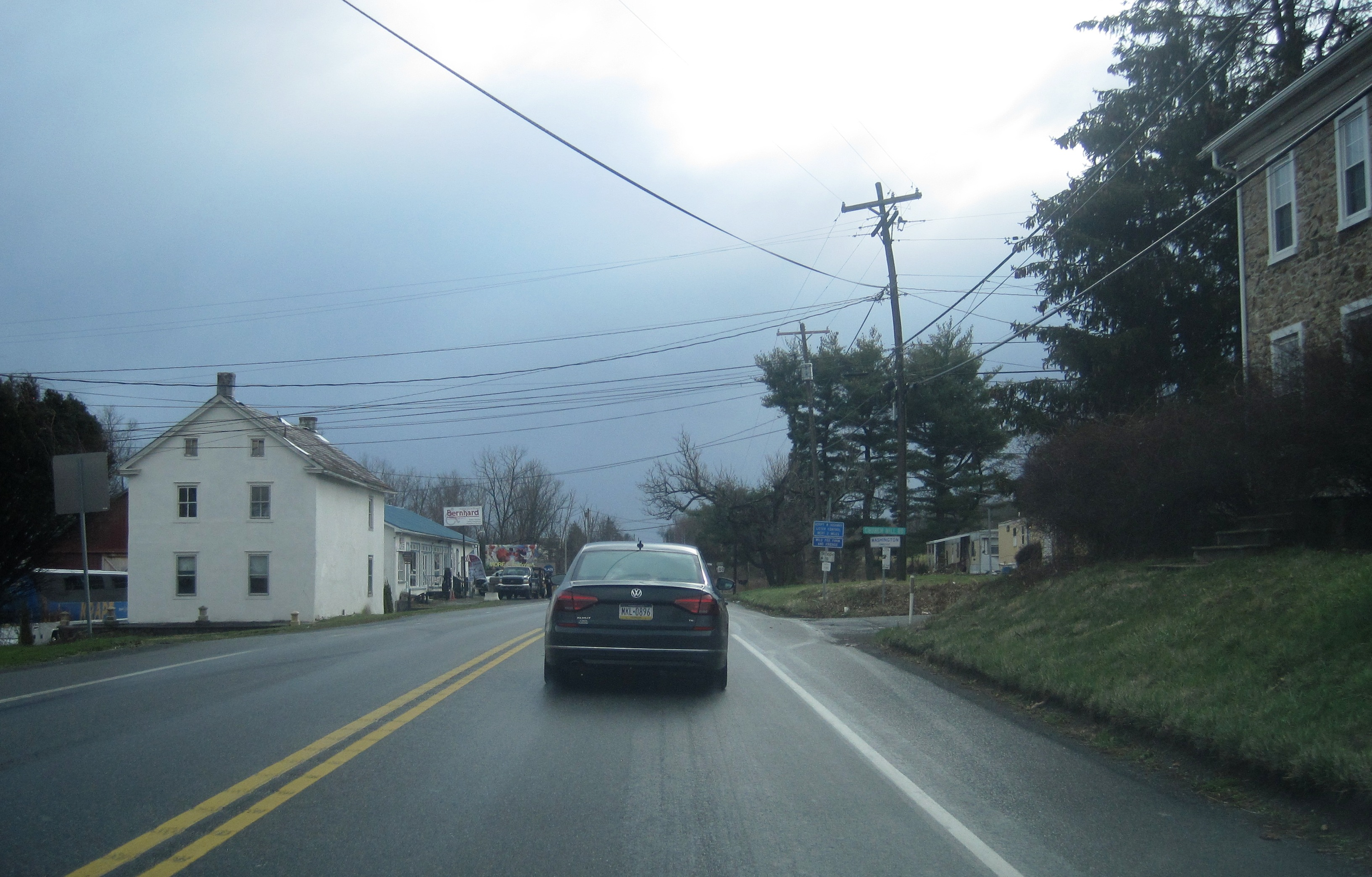
- Clayton along southbound PA 100

- Location within Pennsylvania
- Coordinates: 40°25′5″N 75°34′25″W
- Country: United States
- State: Pennsylvania
- County: Berks
- Township: Hereford and Washington
- Elevation: 427 ft (130 m)
- Time zone: UTC-5 (Eastern (EST))
  - Summer (DST): UTC-4 (EDT)
- Area codes: 610 and 484
- GNIS feature ID: 1203281

Clayton is an unincorporated community in Berks County, Pennsylvania, United States. Clayton is located at the intersection of Pennsylvania Route 100, Church Hill Road, and Kutztown Road on the border of Hereford and Washington townships.
