= Washington Township, Berks County, Pennsylvania =

Township in Pennsylvania, US

Washington Township
- Township
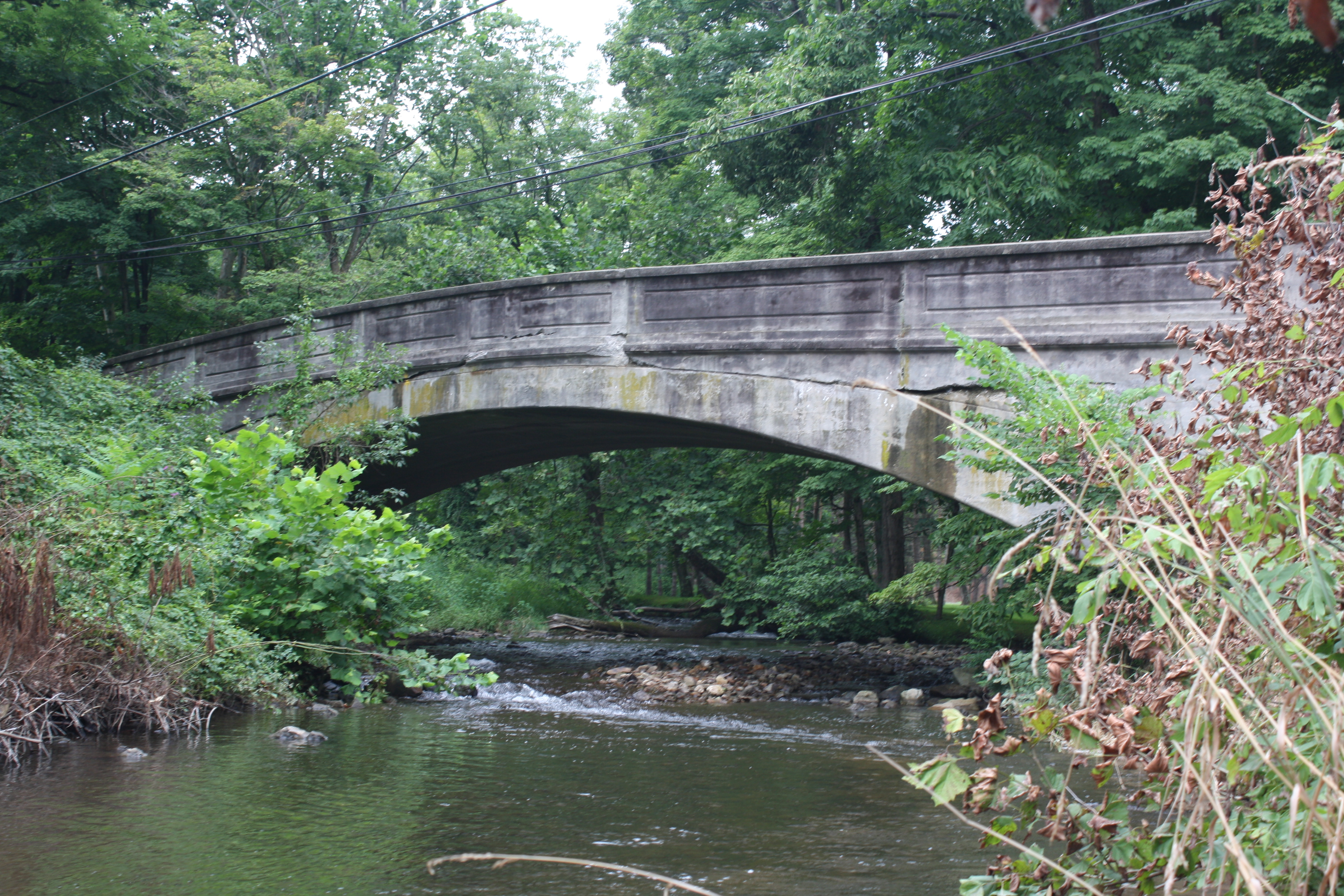
- Barto Bridge in Washington Township
- Motto: "Continuing the Vision/Preserving the Values"
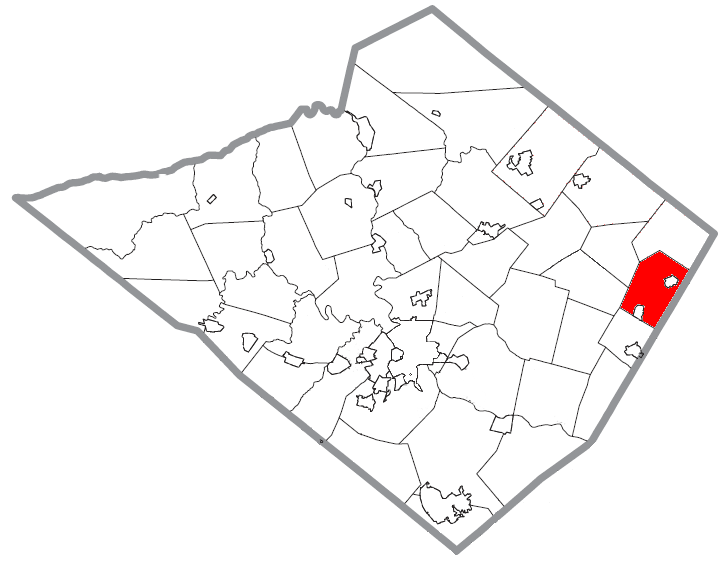
- Location of Washington Township in Berks County, Pennsylvania

- Location of Washington Township in Pennsylvania Washington Township (the United States)
- Coordinates: 40°23′00″N 75°37′59″W
- Country: United States
- State: Pennsylvania
- County: Berks
- Founded: 1840

Area
  - Total: 14.0 sq mi (36 km^{2})
  - Land: 14.0 sq mi (36 km^{2})
  - Water: 0.0 sq mi (0 km^{2})
- Elevation: 554 ft (169 m)

Population (2010)
  - Total: 3,810
  - Estimate (2016): 4,023
  - Density: 239.2/sq mi (92.4/km^{2})
- Time zone: UTC-5 (EST)
  - Summer (DST): UTC-4 (EDT)
- ZIP Codes: 18041, mainly 19504, 19505
- Area Code: 610 and 484
- FIPS code: 42-011-81184
- Website: www.washtwpberks.org/index.asp

Washington Township is a township in eastern Berks County, Pennsylvania, United States. The population was 3,810 at the 2010 census.

== History ==
The Barto Bridge, Borneman Mill, Philip Christman House, and Dale Furnace and Forge Historic District are listed on the National Register of Historic Places.

Washington Township is named in honor of George Washington, first US President.

== Geography ==
According to the United States Census Bureau, the township has a total area of 14.0 square miles (36.3 km^{2}), all land. The Northern portion of the township is drained by the West Branch of the Perkiomen Creek into the Schuylkill River. The southern portion of the township is drained by Swamp Creek (Pennsylvania) into the Perkiomen Creek. The northwestern portion is located in the South Mountains. Washington Township's villages include Barto, Clayton (also in Hereford Township), Dale, Shultzville, and Eshbach.

=== Adjacent municipalities ===
- Hereford Township (north)
- District Township (northwest)
- Pike Township (west)
- Colebrookdale Township (south)
- Douglass Township, Montgomery County (southeast)
- Upper Hanover Township, Montgomery County (east)

The township has a hot-summer humid continental climate (Dfa) and is in hardiness zone 6b. The average monthly temperature in Barto ranges from 29.4 °F in January to 74.2 °F in July.

Washington Township surrounds the borough of Bally and portions of the borough of Bechtelsville.

== Demographics ==
Historical population
Census	Pop.	Note	%±
1980	2,569		—
1990	2,799		9.0%
2000	3,354		19.8%
2010	3,810		13.6%
2016 (est.)	4,023		5.6%
Source: US Census Bureau

As of the census of 2000, there were 3,354 people, 1,212 households, and 970 families living in the township. The population density was 239.2 inhabitants per square mile (92.4/km^{2}). There were 1,250 housing units at an average density of 89.2 per square mile (34.4/km^{2}). The racial makeup of the township was 97.88% White, 0.75% African American, 0.09% Native American, 0.33% Asian, 0.24% from other races, and 0.72% from two or more races. Hispanic or Latino of any race were 0.66% of the population.

There were 1,212 households, out of which 35.6% had children under the age of 18 living with them, 70.5% were married couples living together, 6.0% had a female householder with no husband present, and 19.9% were non-families. 15.1% of all households were made up of individuals, and 6.0% had someone living alone who was 65 years of age or older. The average household size was 2.77 and the average family size was 3.08.

In the township the population was spread out, with 25.8% under the age of 18, 6.1% from 18 to 24, 30.8% from 25 to 44, 25.8% from 45 to 64, and 11.5% who were 65 years of age or older. The median age was 38 years. For every 100 females there were 104.8 males. For every 100 females age 18 and over, there were 103.7 males.

The median income for a household in the township was $53,241, and the median income for a family was $60,054. Males had a median income of $37,951 versus $26,298 for females. The per capita income for the township was $20,454. About 2.1% of families and 3.0% of the population were below the poverty line, including 2.3% of those under age 18 and 2.1% of those age 65 or over.

== Government and politics ==
=== Legislators ===
- State Representative David Maloney Sr., Republican, 130th district
- State Senator Tracy Pennycuick, Democrat, 24th district
- US Representative Madeleine Dean, Democrat, 4th district
- US Senator John Fetterman, Democrat
- US Senator David McCormick, Republican

=== Board of Supervisors ===
- Romnie Long, Chairman
- Thomas Powanda, Vice Chairman
- Matt McClusky

== Recreation ==
The township has two community parks (Barto Community Park and Washington Township Park), one nature preserve (Naigle Nature Preserve & Woodlands) and three open spaces. One parcel of the Pennsylvania State Game Lands Number 315 is located on Forge Dale Road northwest of Barto, a second parcel is located along the northern border with Hereford Township.

== Transportation ==
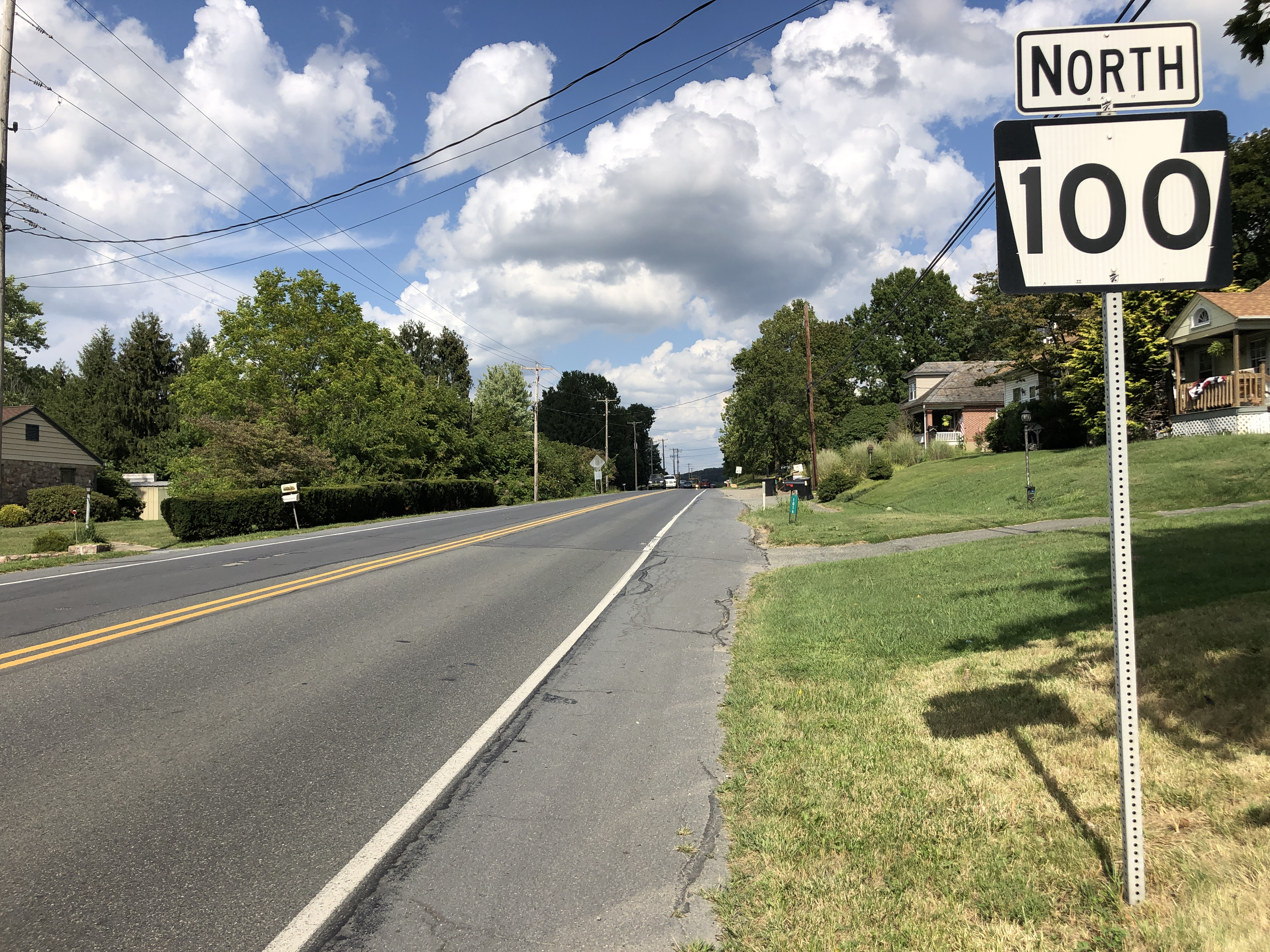
PA 100 northbound in Washington Township

As of 2019, there were 46.55 miles (74.91 km) of public roads in Washington Township, of which 13.51 miles (21.74 km) were maintained by the Pennsylvania Department of Transportation (PennDOT) and 33.04 miles (53.17 km) were maintained by the township.

Pennsylvania Route 100 crosses Washington Township north-to-south on its path from Lehigh County to Pottstown via Bally. Other local roads of note include Barto Road, County Line Road, Forgedale Road, Hoffmansville Road, Old Route 100, and Niantic Road.
