= Philip Christman House =

Historic house in Pennsylvania, United States

- U.S. National Register of Historic Places
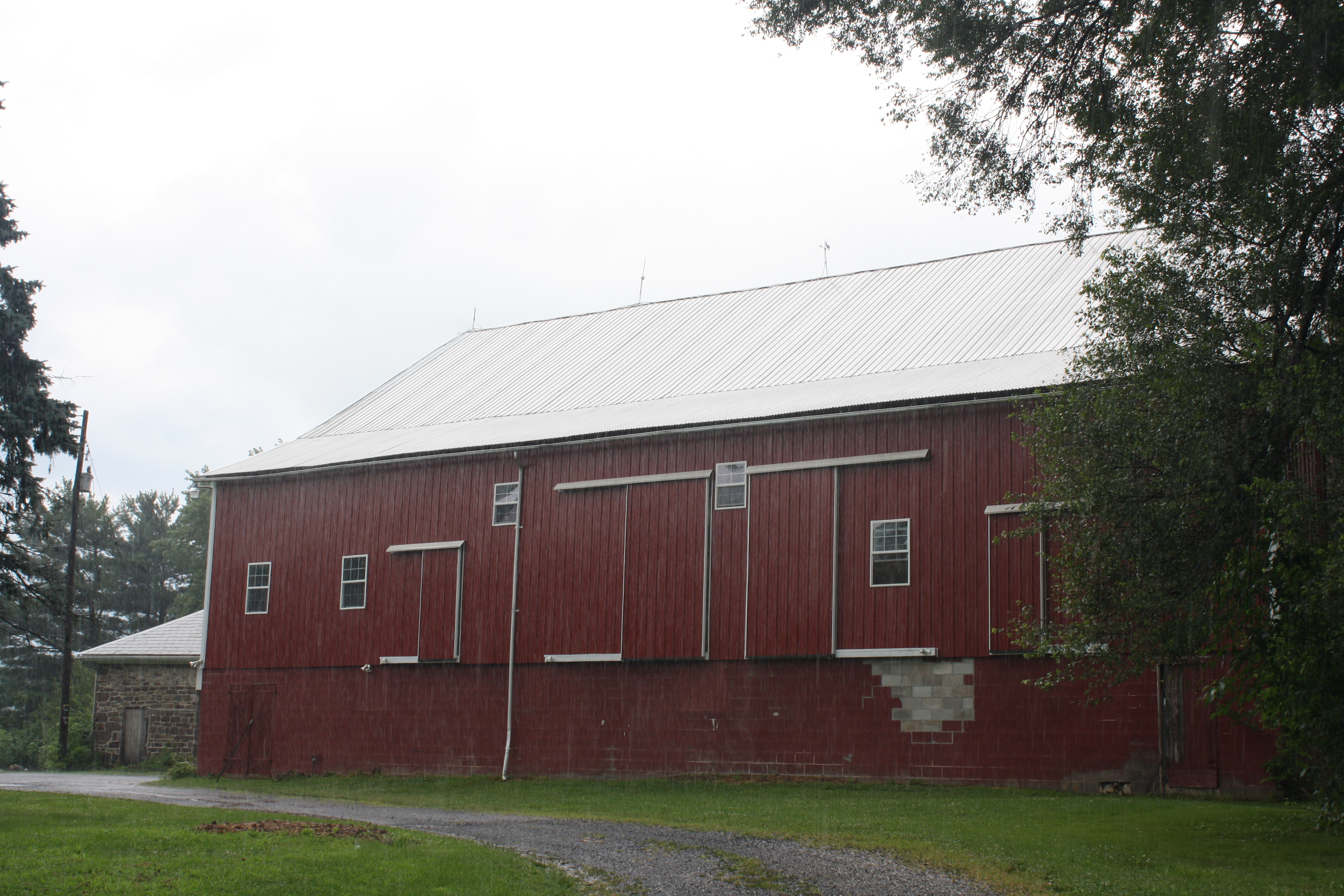
- Barn. July 2013.

- Location within Pennsylvania Location within the United States
- Location: 1 mile (1.6 km) southeast of Bally at the Berks, Washington Township, Pennsylvania
- Coordinates: 40°24′00″N 75°34′13″W
- Area: 65 acres (26 ha)
- NRHP reference No.: 73001588
- Added to NRHP: March 7, 1973

Philip Christman House, also erroneously known as the Uhlrich Beidler House, is a historic home located at Washington Township, Berks County, Pennsylvania. It was built between 1730 and 1750, and is a 2 1/2-story, banked stone dwelling with a gable roof. It is an example of regional Germanic architecture.

It was listed on the National Register of Historic Places in 1973.
