= Annie Funk =

American missionary (1874–1912)

Annie Clemmer Funk
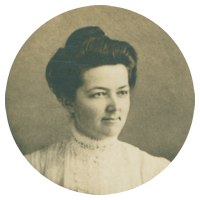
- Photo of Annie Clemmer Funk
- Born: 12 April 1874; Bally, Pennsylvania
- Died: 15 April 1912 (aged 38); North Atlantic Ocean
- Occupation: Missionary

Annie Clemmer Funk (12 April 1874 – 15 April 1912) was an American Christian missionary and one of the more than 1500 people who died in the sinking of RMS Titanic. Since 1906, she had been a missionary in the Janjgir-Champa district in Chhattisgarh, India. She was on her way to visit her ailing mother.

== Early life ==
Annie Funk was born on 12 April 1874 in the small town of Bally, Pennsylvania. Her ancestors, who settled there in the 1700s, were Mennonite emigrants from Germany. Miss Funk attended the State Normal School at West Chester.

Her home congregation, the Hereford General Conference Mennonite Church, where her father was a deacon for 25 years, nurtured her interest in missions from childhood. She attended the Northfield Bible Training School in Northfield, Massachusetts that D. L. Moody had begun. After graduation, she worked with the immigrants in the slums of Chattanooga, Tennessee and Paterson, New Jersey. She dreamt of being a missionary.

== Missionary to India ==
After the stateside assignments, she volunteered to go overseas. She had unqualified trust in God. Once she stated to a friend who feared for her safety on the first transatlantic voyage that, "Our heavenly Father is as near to us on sea as on land. My trust is in Him. I have no fear." Thus, her dream of being a missionary was realized in December 1906, when she was sent to India as the first female Mennonite missionary.

Annie arrived in India and served in Janjgir-Champa district, in Chhattisgarh. In 1908, she opened a one-room school and hostel for poor girls. The school initially taught 17 students. She also learned Hindi during her stay. The school was later renamed the Annie C Funk Memorial School. Only the outer walls survive today, with a small plaque which describes her life and her death.

== Death ==
Funk's work was interrupted by a telegram which read, "Come home at once. Mother very ill. Have purchased on two ships, Pastor Shelly." Though she was not told that her mother was close to death, Annie made her travel plans quickly. After a long journey to Liverpool, she learned that the ship that would take her to America would be delayed by a coal strike. Her booking was transferred to RMS Titanic. She bought her second class ticket for £13.

Titanic left Southampton on April 10, 1912. When on the fourth day of the voyage the ship struck an iceberg, Funk lost her life after (an unconfirmed story holds) giving up her lifeboat seat to a mother and a child. Her body, if recovered, was never identified.

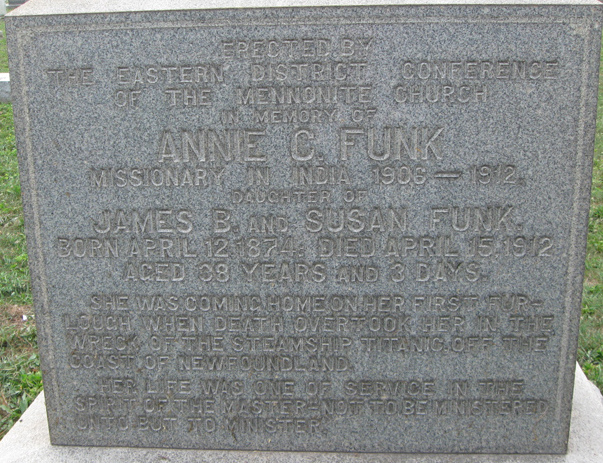
Annie Funk's memorial grave stone erected near Bally, Pennsylvania

A memorial at the Hereford Mennonite Church Cemetery, Pennsylvania recites:

SHE WAS COMING HOME ON HER FIRST FURLOUGH, WHEN DEATH OVERTOOK HER IN THE WRECK OF THE STEAMSHIP TITANIC OFF THE COAST OF NEWFOUNDLAND. HER LIFE WAS ONE OF SERVICE IN THE SPIRIT OF THE MASTER – NOT TO BE MINISTERED UNTO BUT TO MINISTER.

A documentary titled Remembering Annie Funk was scheduled to be screened in her home state, Pennsylvania, according to Mennonite Heritage Centre website.
