= John Gehman Farm =

- U.S. National Register of Historic Places
- U.S. Historic district
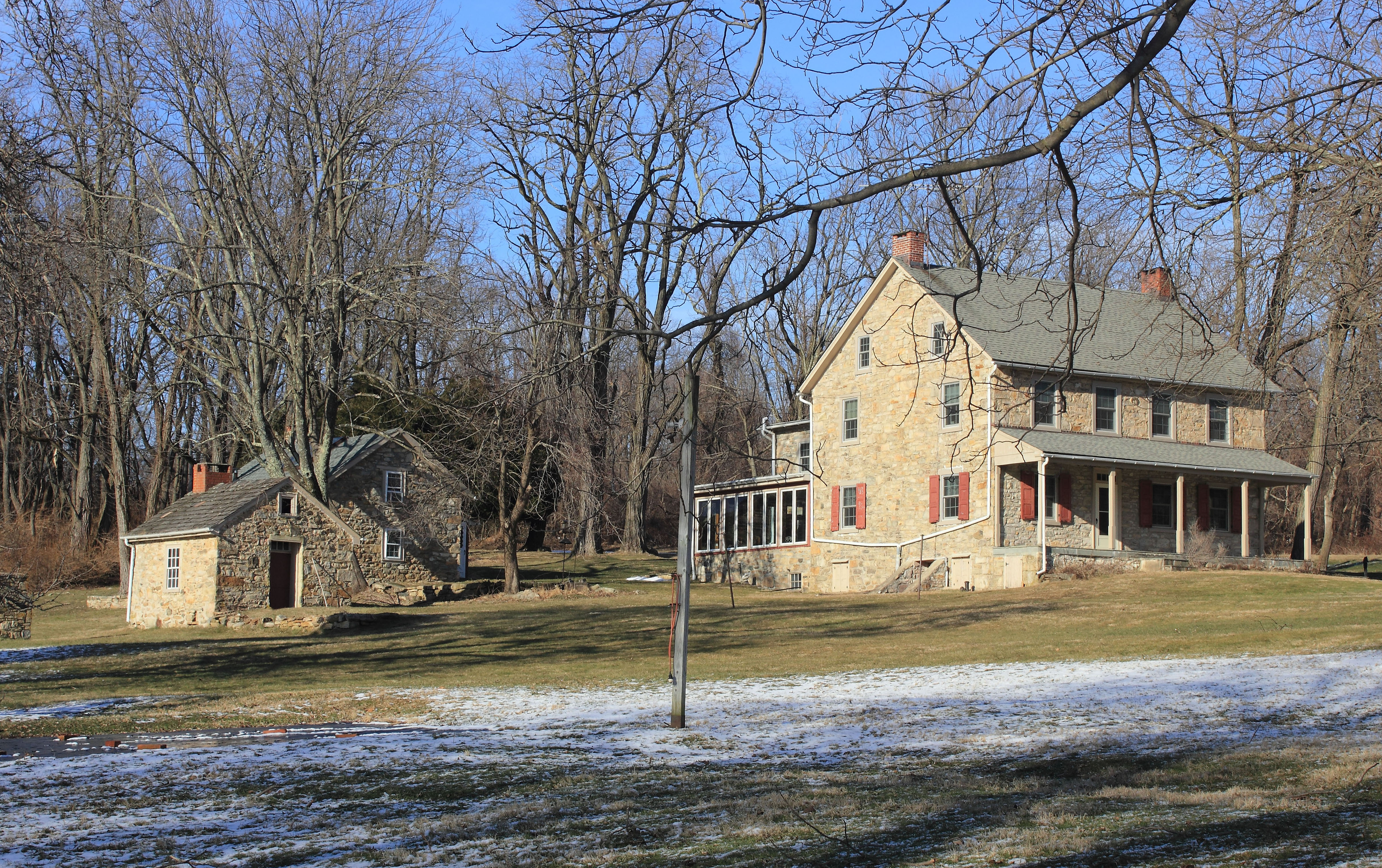

- Location within Pennsylvania Location within the United States
- Location: Township Rd. N of Harlem, Hereford Township, Pennsylvania
- Coordinates: 40°28′08″N 75°35′09″W
- Area: 87 acres (35 ha)
- Built: c. 1767, 1806, c. 1810
- Architectural style: Swiss bank house
- MPS: Farms in Berks County MPS
- NRHP reference No.: 92000398
- Added to NRHP: May 7, 1992

John Gehman Farm is a historic farm complex and national historic district located in Hereford Township, Berks County, Pennsylvania. It has seven contributing buildings. They are the 2 1/2-story, stone and log Swiss bank house (c. 1767); stone Pennsylvania bank barn (1806); 2 1/2-story, vernacular stone farmhouse (c. 1810), stable, wagon shed, and privy. The Gehman family owned the farm from about 1767 to 1945. They were of German ancestry, originating in the Rhineland-Palatinate region of Germany.

It was listed on the National Register of Historic Places in 1992.
