= Dale Furnace and Forge Historic District =

Historic district in Pennsylvania, United States

- U.S. National Register of Historic Places
- U.S. Historic district
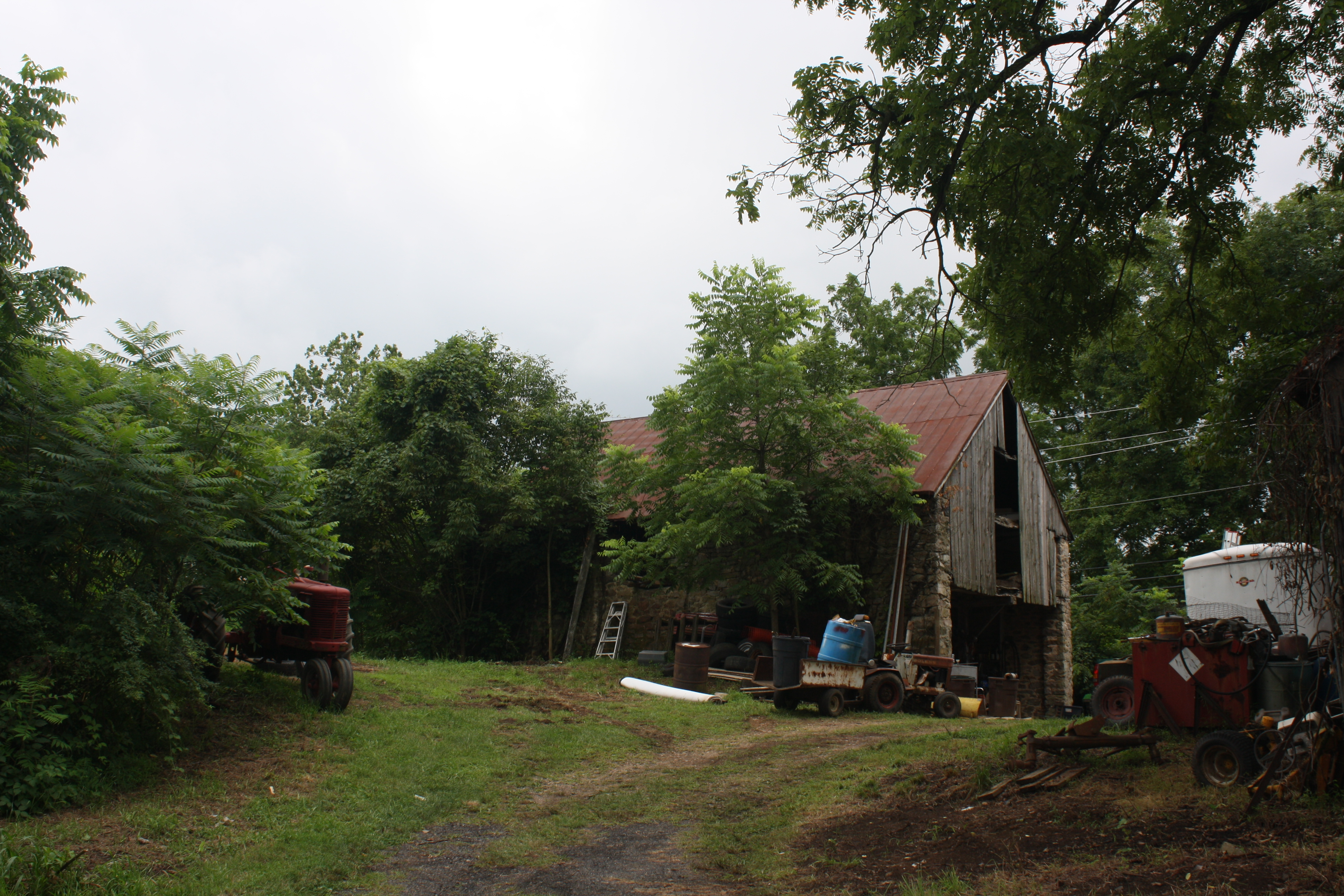
- Horse barn. July 2013.

- Location within Pennsylvania Location within the United States
- Location: Forgedale Road northwest of Bally, Washington Township, Pennsylvania
- Coordinates: 40°25′21″N 75°37′01″W
- Area: 19 acres (7.7 ha)
- Built: c. 1791, 1827, 1854
- Architectural style: Federal, Iron furnace
- MPS: Iron and Steel Resources of Pennsylvania MPS
- NRHP reference No.: 91001134
- Added to NRHP: September 6, 1991

Dale Furnace and Forge Historic District, also known as Dale Iron Works and Mt. Chalfont Furnace, is a historic "iron plantation" and national historic district located in Washington Township, Berks County, Pennsylvania. The district encompasses six contributing buildings and one contributing site. They are a stone horse barn (c. 1850), stone and frame bank barn (c. 1850), ironmaster's mansion (1791, 1827), smokehouse and wash house (1827), stone worker's house (1830), and counting house (1827, 1854). The archaeological site includes the ruins of a worker's house, the stone furnace stack (c. 1791), bank iron furnace, forge foundations and race (c. 1804-1811), and remnants of dam breast. The furnace remained in blast until about 1822, and the Dale Forge was in operation until 1868.

It was listed on the National Register of Historic Places in 1991. It was bought by the Schalls in the 1820s, and it has been passed down through the Schall-Dibbern-Snow family since. The current owner is Natalie Dibbern.
