= Borneman Mill =

- U.S. National Register of Historic Places
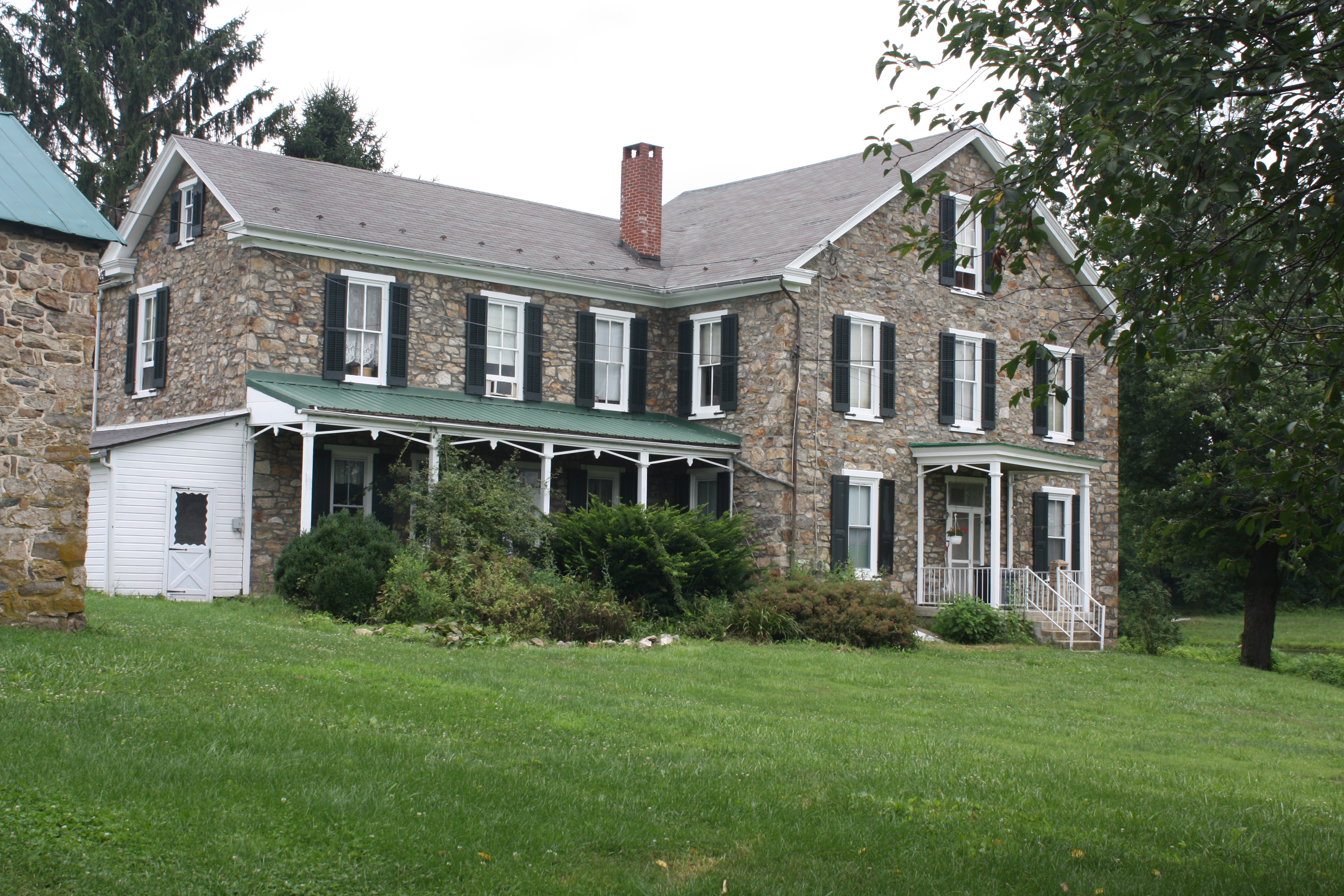
- Farmhouse. July 2013.

- Location within Pennsylvania Location within the United States
- Location: Off Pennsylvania Route 100 southwest of Clayton, Washington Township, Pennsylvania
- Coordinates: 40°24′57″N 75°34′39″W
- Area: 1.5 acres (0.61 ha)
- Built: c. 1860
- MPS: Gristmills in Berks County MPS
- NRHP reference No.: 90001612
- Added to NRHP: November 8, 1990

Borneman Mill, also known as Stauffer Mill, is a historic "farm mill" located in Washington Township, Berks County, Pennsylvania. The mill was built to perform farm chores with water power. The mill was built before 1860, and is a two-story, with basement, post-and-beam building with vertical siding. It measures 21 feet, 6 inches, by 24 feet, 6 inches. The mill powered operations in the nearby stone bank barn (after 1850) by use of a cable drive system. Also on the property are a contributing farmhouse (1810, 1850) and smokehouse (c. 1850).

It was listed on the National Register of Historic Places in 1990.
