= Bally, Pennsylvania =

Borough in Pennsylvania, US

- Borough
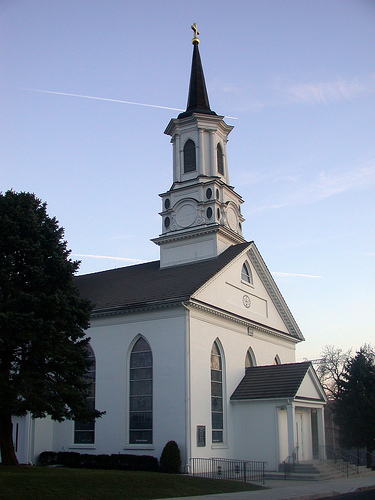
- Most Blessed Sacrament Church in Bally, Pennsylvania

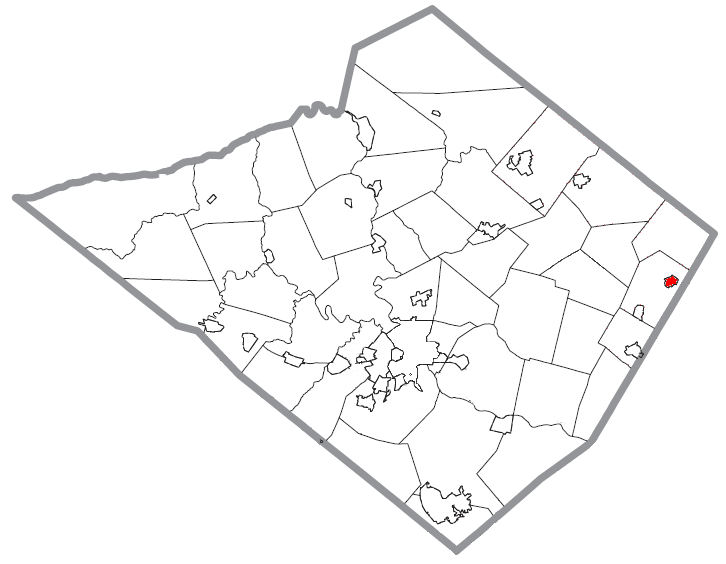
- Location of Bally in Berks County, Pennsylvania

- Location of Bally in Pennsylvania Bally (the United States)
- Coordinates: 40°24′04″N 75°35′18″W
- Country: United States
- State: Pennsylvania
- County: Berks
- School District: Boyertown
- Incorporated: 1912

Government
  - Mayor: David Schott

Area
  - Total: 0.51 sq mi (1.33 km^{2})
  - Land: 0.51 sq mi (1.33 km^{2})
  - Water: 0 sq mi (0.00 km^{2})
- Elevation: 259 ft (79 m)

Population (2020)
  - Total: 1,228
  - Density: 2,394.1/sq mi (924.36/km^{2})
- Time zone: UTC-5 (EST)
  - Summer (DST): UTC-4 (EDT)
- ZIP Code: 19503
- Area code: 610
- FIPS code: 42-03984
- Website: ballyboro.org

Bally is a borough in Berks County, Pennsylvania, United States. The population was 1,228 at the 2020 census.

== History ==
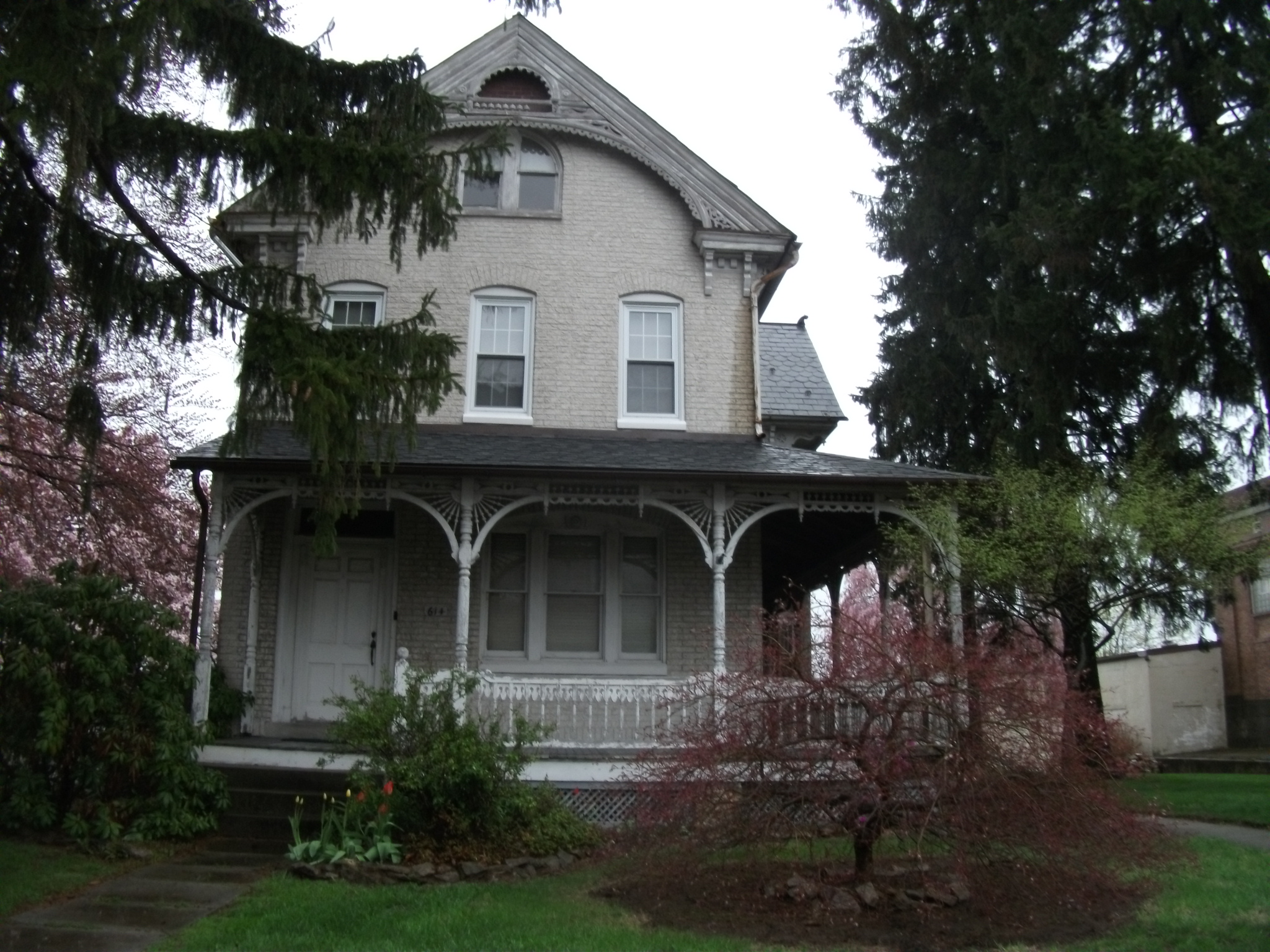
A home in Bally

=== Early settlement and religious foundations ===
Bally was originally called Goshenhoppen, possibly deriving from an Indigenous word meaning "meeting place". Others claim the name derives from German settlers calling the area their haven or Hafen in German, eventually becoming Goshenhoppen. Mennonites and Catholics settled in the area in the early 18th century, creating one of colonial Pennsylvania's most notable religious communities.

Clergyman Ulrich Beidler erected the first house of worship, the Mennonite Church, in 1731. Father Theodore Schneider, a Jesuit priest, arrived in the area in 1741 and established what would become the third Catholic mission church in the thirteen original colonies. Working cooperatively with the established Mennonite community, Father Schneider built St. Paul's Chapel in 1743 on land received from local Mennonites. Now known as the Most Blessed Sacrament Church, it is the oldest continuously operating Catholic place of worship in Pennsylvania and the fourth oldest Catholic structure in the thirteen original colonies.

=== Educational legacy ===
Father Schneider established a Catholic school at the mission church in 1743, originally called St. Aloysius Academy. This institution marked not only the beginning of Catholic education in the thirteen original colonies but became the oldest continuously operated Catholic school in Pennsylvania. After several name changes over the centuries, it is currently known as Saint Francis Classical Catholic Academy and holds the distinction of being one of the three oldest Catholic schools in the original thirteen colonies.

=== Municipal development ===
To reflect the numerous churches in the growing community, Goshenhoppen was renamed Churchville. When the United States Post Office was established in the community in 1883, residents changed the name to Bally in honor of Father Augustine Bally, S.J., a beloved Catholic pastor who had served the parish for 45 years (1837-1882) and died the previous year.

Bally was incorporated as a borough in 1912, with Henry Eddinger, son of Frederick K. and Sophia (Miller) Eddinger, appointed as the first Burgess. The borough has traditionally been home to many Pennsylvania Dutch settlers and their descendants, maintaining its cultural heritage into the modern era.

=== Notable events and residents ===
In 1912, Bally resident Annie Funk, a Mennonite missionary to India, perished during the sinking of the RMS Titanic. Funk was returning to Bally to visit her ailing mother and reportedly gave up her seat in a lifeboat to another passenger as the ship sank, embodying the community's values of service and sacrifice.

The mid-20th century artist and designer Harry Bertoia settled in the Bally area, where he established his studio and workshop on Main Street. The Bertoia Studio, now maintained by his family, remains a site of historical significance and continues the borough's artistic legacy.

=== Industrial development ===
The 20th century brought significant industrial development to Bally, most notably with the founding of Bally Ribbon Mills in 1923. This textile manufacturer became internationally recognized for producing specialized woven textiles and tapes for aerospace, medical, and industrial sectors, establishing Bally as a center for precision textile manufacturing that continues to the present day.

== Economy ==
Bally's economy is rooted in its history of textile and manufacturing but includes a diverse range of local retail, service, and agricultural businesses that serve the community and the surrounding region. Alongside its established industries, the borough hosts a sector of small, independently owned businesses and self-employed professionals.

Manufacturing and industry The borough has a strong industrial base, anchored by several long-standing companies.

- Bally Ribbon Mills, founded in 1923, is a manufacturer of specialized woven textiles and tapes for the aerospace, medical, and industrial sectors.
- The Weil-McLain facility (originating from the acquired PB Heat LLC) produces cast iron boilers under the Weil-McLain and Peerless® brands and is a major employer.
- Bally Block Co. continues to manufacture butcher block and is a key subsidiary of The Wood-Welded Companies, a family-owned corporation based in Bally.
- The textile manufacturing presence also includes Great American Weaving Corporation, a manufacturer of narrow woven fabrics.

Agriculture While the borough itself is primarily commercial and residential, it lies within the fertile Butter Valley, and the surrounding townships support an active agricultural sector with numerous dairy and crop farms.

== Geography ==
Bally is located at 40°24′4″N 75°35′18″W (40.401044, -75.588365). According to the U.S. Census Bureau, the borough has a total area of 0.5 square miles (1.3 km^{2}), all land. It is surrounded by Washington Township.

== Demographics ==
Historical population
Census	Pop.	Note	%±
1920	387		—
1930	579		49.6%
1940	613		5.9%
1950	753		22.8%
1960	1,033		37.2%
1970	1,197		15.9%
1980	1,051		−12.2%
1990	973		−7.4%
2000	1,062		9.1%
2010	1,090		2.6%
2020	1,228		12.7%

As of the 2010 census, Bally had a population of 1090. The median age was 41.9. The racial and ethnic composition of the population was 96.8% non-Hispanic white, 0.6% black or African American, 0.1% Native American, 0.6% Asian, 0.8% reporting two or more races and 1.4% Hispanic or Latino.

As of the 2000 census, there were 1,062 people, 413 households, and 304 families residing in the borough. The population density was 2,030.4 inhabitants per square mile (783.9/km^{2}). There were 426 housing units at an average density of 814.5 per square mile (314.5/km^{2}). The racial makeup of the borough was 98.78% White, 0.47% African American, 0.19% Native American, 0.47% Asian, and 0.09% from two or more races. Hispanic or Latino of any race were 0.28% of the population.

There were 413 households, out of which 28.8% had children under the age of 18 living with them, 59.3% were married couples living together, 10.9% had a female householder with no husband present, and 26.2% were non-families. 22.8% of all households were made up of individuals, and 12.6% had someone living alone who was 65 years of age or older. The average household size was 2.57 and the average family size was 2.98.

In the borough, the population was spread out, with 22.6% under the age of 18, 7.9% from 18 to 24, 27.7% from 25 to 44, 23.0% from 45 to 64, and 18.8% who were 65 years of age or older. The median age was 39 years. For every 100 females there were 100.0 males. For every 100 females age 18 and over, there were 96.7 males.

The median income for a household in the borough was $49,063, and the median income for a family was $56,406. Males had a median income of $37,750 versus $25,000 for females. The per capita income for the borough was $24,537. About 0.7% of families and 1.6% of the population were below the poverty line, including 2.2% of those under age 18 and none of those age 65 or over.

== Education ==
=== Public education ===
Public education in Bally is provided by the Boyertown Area School District. The district operates ten schools, with Washington Elementary School in nearby Barto serving the borough's elementary students.

Local educational institutions also include:

- Saint Francis Classical Catholic Academy, a private school offering a classical curriculum for Pre-K through 8th grade.
- Bally Community Preschool, a non-profit preschool program.

== Public services ==
=== Emergency Services ===
The borough is served by three primary emergency service organizations providing comprehensive coverage to residents and visitors.

Fire protection

Fire protection is provided by the Eastern Berks Fire Department, which was formed in 2011 through a merger of several volunteer companies, including the Volunteer Barto Fire Company, Keystone Fire Company (Bechtelsville), Goodwill Fire Company (Bally), and Bechtelsville Fire Company. The department operates multiple stations and provides emergency response to fires, motor vehicle accidents, storm-related incidents, and water rescues.

Emergency medical services

Emergency medical services are provided by Bally Community Ambulance Association, an Advanced Life Support (ALS) service offering basic, intermediate, and advanced life support emergency medical services. The organization operates 24/7 with a team of Emergency Medical Responders (EMRs), Emergency Medical Technicians (EMTs), Advanced EMTs, Paramedics, and Prehospital Registered Nurses (PHRNs).

Police services

Law enforcement is provided by the Bally Police Department, which offers both emergency and non-emergency services to the community. The department maintains offices at Borough Hall and can be reached for non-emergency matters at (610) 845-2400 or (267) 287-6191.

=== Municipal services ===
Public Works Department

The Borough's Public Works Department handles daily operations of the water and sewer systems, along with street maintenance, park upkeep, and Community Pool maintenance. The department manages the borough's water treatment and distribution system, which has served the community since 1929, and operates the sewer treatment facility that was established in 1969.

Water and sewer authority

Water services are provided through the Bally Borough Municipal Authority, which was formed in November 2020 when the Borough acquired Washington Township's water system. The authority manages water treatment, distribution, and billing, while the Borough operates the sewer collection system and treatment facility.

== Transportation ==
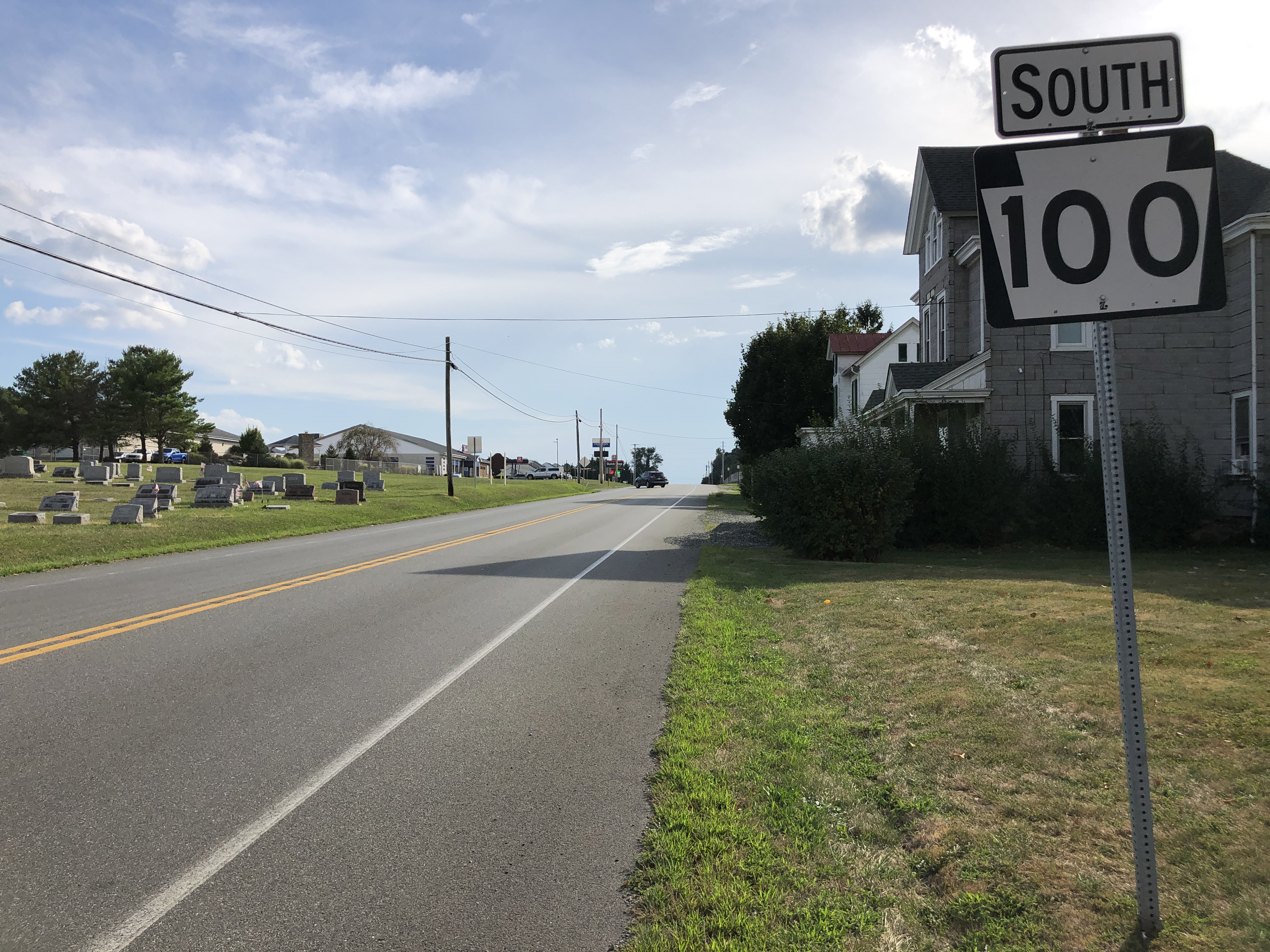
PA 100 southbound in Bally

As of 2006, there were 5.67 miles (9.12 km) of public roads in Bally, 1.11 miles (1.79 km) of which are maintained by the Pennsylvania Department of Transportation (PennDOT) and 4.56 miles (7.34 km) of which are maintained by the borough.

Pennsylvania Route 100 is the only numbered highway serving Bally. It follows Main Street along a southwest–northeast alignment through the center of the borough.
