= Perkiomen Creek =

Tributary of the Schuylkill River in Pennsylvania

Coordinates: 40°07′10″N 75°27′42″W

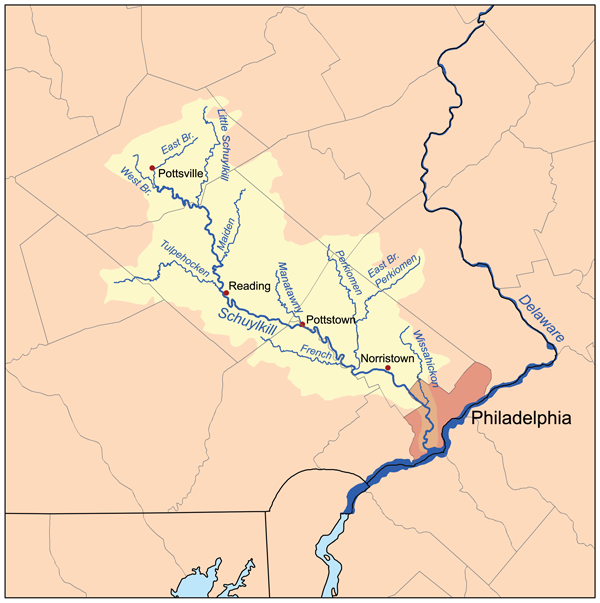
Perkiomen Creek joins the Schuylkill River west of Norristown

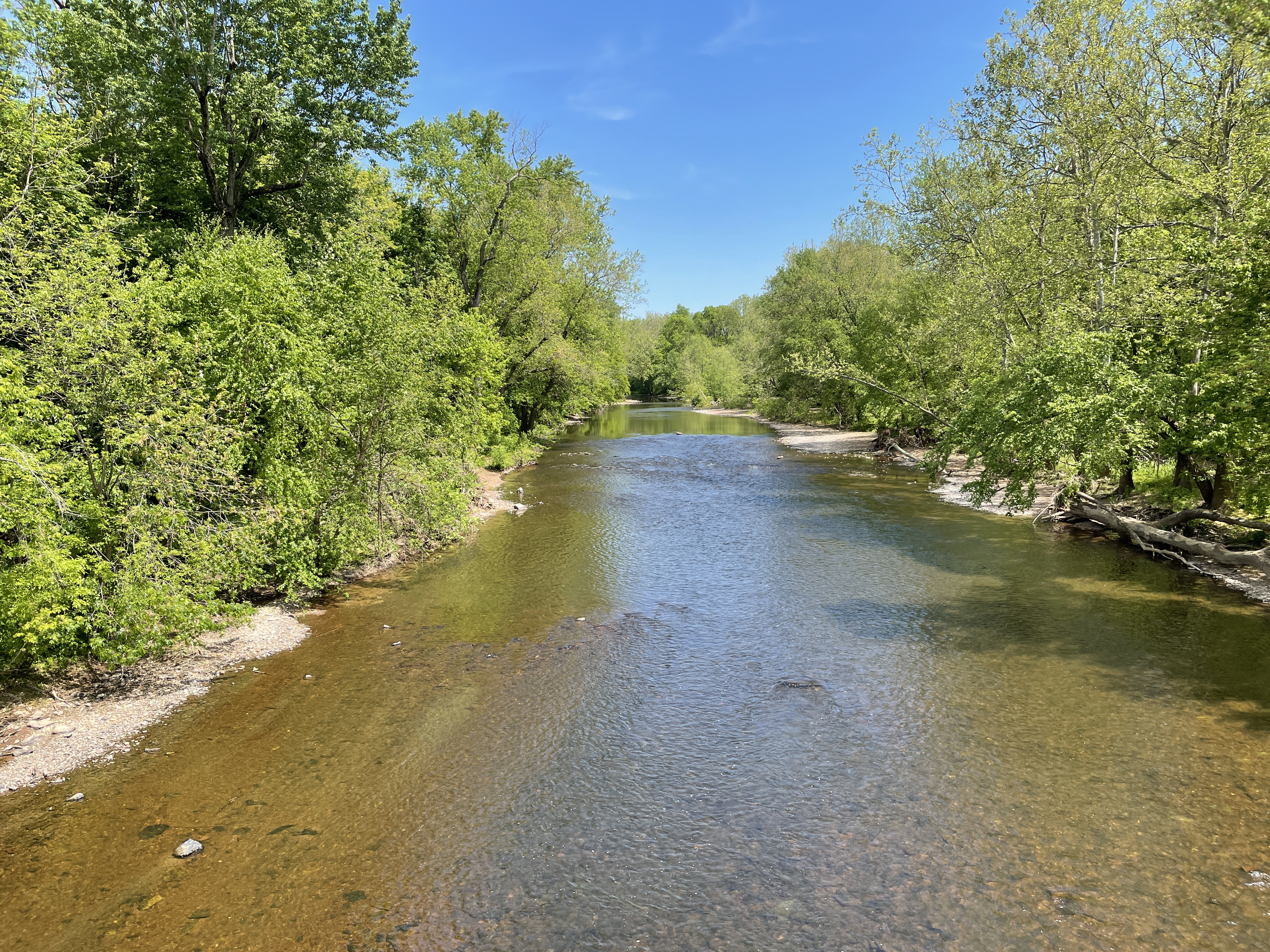
Perkiomen Creek in Rahns, Pennsylvania, in May 2021

Perkiomen Creek is a 37.7-mile-long (60.7 km) tributary of the Schuylkill River in Berks, Lehigh, and Montgomery counties in Pennsylvania. Historically, the water course was also named Perquaminck Creek, on Thomas Holme's 1687 map of the region, which was published by William Penn, founder of the colonial-era Province of Pennsylvania.

== History ==
The Perkiomen Trail was established in 2003 as a partnership with the Montgomery County Planning Commission and local governments to provide a walking, jogging, and biking path along the creek that stretches south from Green Lane Reservoir Park to near the Schuylkill River, where it meets the Schuylkill River Trail.

== Geography ==
The creek begins in Hereford Township, Berks County, initially flows eastward into Upper Milford Township, Lehigh County, and turns southward to reenter Hereford Township before entering Montgomery County. It is from the Lenape term Pakihm Unk (pronounced for Pah Keym Unk), which means "cranberry place" in English.

The Green Lane Reservoir is formed by a dam on the creek on the north side of Green Lane that backs up water from there to the north of Route 663.

Perkiomen Creek joins the Schuylkill River approximately 1.7 miles (2.7 km) downstream of the community of Audubon, the location of the National Audubon Society wildlife sanctuary Mill Grove Farm, once the estate of 19th-century ornithologist John James Audubon. Its largest tributary is East Branch Perkiomen Creek.

== In popular culture ==
The 1970 song "Perkiomen" by Hall and Oates is named after the Perkiomen Creek.

== See also ==
- List of rivers of Pennsylvania
