= Conrad Weiser High School =

Secondary school in Robesonia, Pennsylvania, US

Coordinates: 40.3483°N 76.1186°W

- Conrad Weiser Athletic Logo

Location
- 44 Big Spring Road; Robesonia, Berks County, Pennsylvania

Information
- School type: Secondary
- School district: Conrad Weiser Area School District
- Principal: Robert Galtere
- Teaching staff: 67.33 (on an FTE basis)
- Enrollment: 858 (2023–2024)
- Student to teacher ratio: 12.74
- Colors: Navy Blue and White
- Mascot: Scout
- Feeder schools: Conrad Weiser Middle School
- Website: Conrad Weiser HS

Conrad Weiser High School is a public high school in Robesonia in Berks County, Pennsylvania. It is part of the Conrad Weiser Area School District and serves students in grades 9–12 in South Heidelberg Township, Heidelberg Township, North Heidelberg Township, and Marion Township and the boroughs of Wernersville, Robesonia, and Womelsdorf. Eight properties in a housing development in West Cocalico in Lancaster County also attend the high school.

According to the National Center for Education Statistics, Conrad Weiser High School reported an enrollment of 809 pupils in grades 9–12 as of the 2020-21 school year.

== Notable alumni ==
- Pat Gelsinger (did not graduate), former CEO of Intel
- Jay Hoffman, (class of 1968) soccer coach who was an assistant for the United States women's national soccer team
- Amy Cuddy (class of 1990), psychologist
- Jackie Briggs (class of 2006), field hockey player who competed for the United States women's national field hockey team, 2x Olympian
- Austin Highley (class of 2015), wrestler who competes for Impact Wrestling under the name Ace Austin
