= Stouchsburg, Pennsylvania =

Unincorporated community in Pennsylvania, US

- Census-designated place
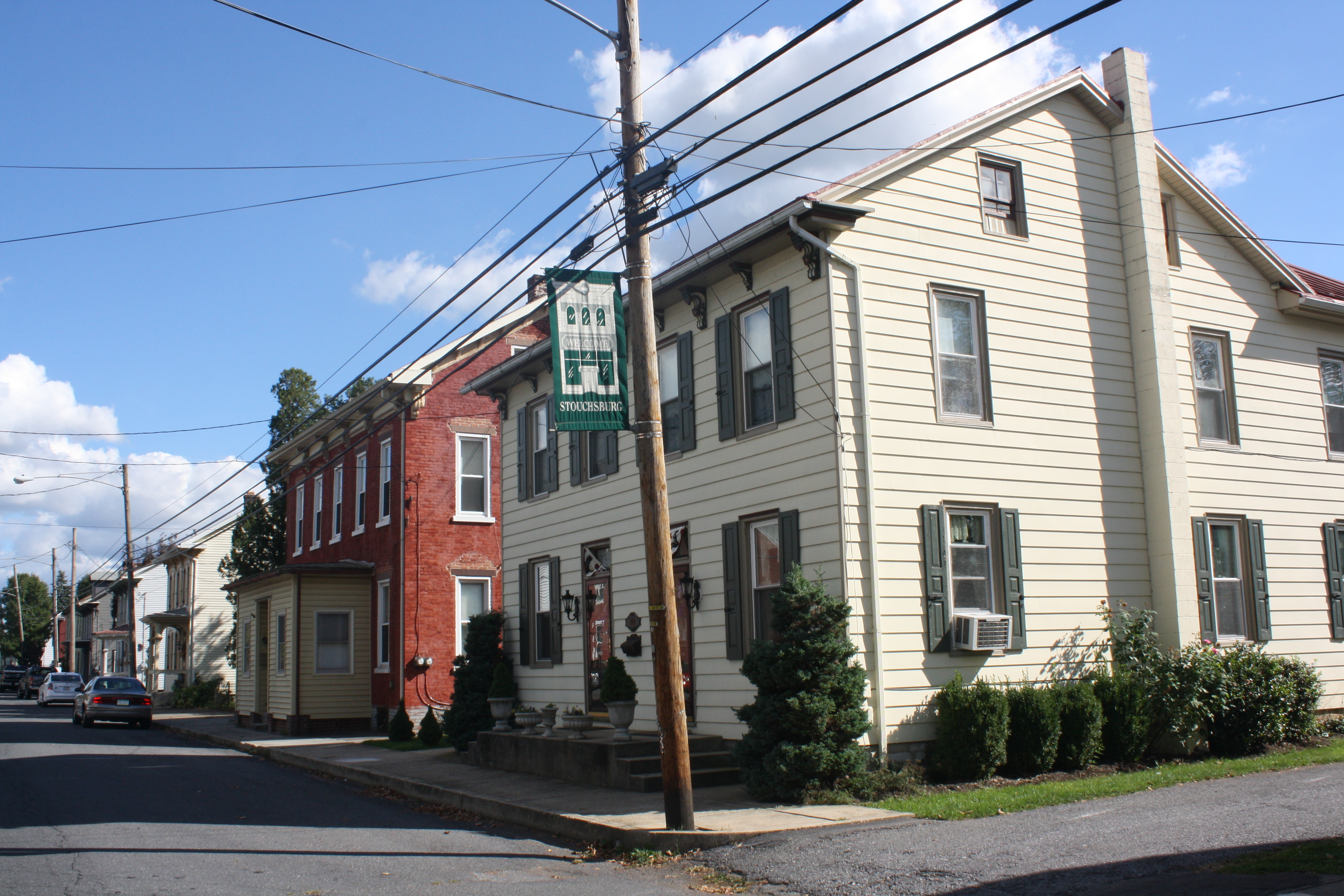
- Main Street in Stouchsburg

- Location within Pennsylvania Location within the United States
- Coordinates: 40°22′48″N 76°13′56″W
- Country: United States
- State: Pennsylvania
- County: Berks
- Township: Marion

Population (2010)
  - Total: 600
- Time zone: Eastern (EST)
  - Summer (DST): EDT

Stouchsburg is an unincorporated community, and a census-designated place, located in extreme western Berks County, Pennsylvania, United States. As of the 2010 census, it had a population of 600. It is just off U.S. Route 422 along Main St. in Marion Township, and is served by the Conrad Weiser Area School District. The community is located three miles northwest of Womelsdorf and four miles east of Myerstown.

== Historic places ==
The Peter Spicker House and Stouchsburg Historic District are listed on the National Register of Historic Places.

== Notable person ==
- G. Gilbert Snyder, local author and broadcaster
