= Conrad Weiser Area School District =

School district in Pennsylvania

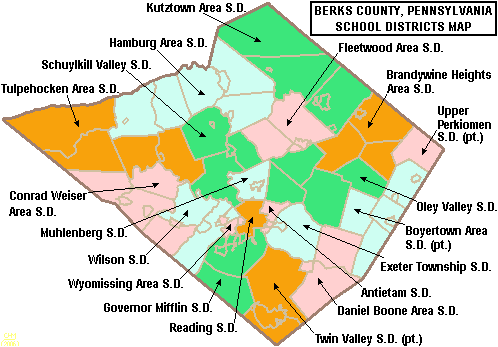
- Map of Berks County, Pennsylvania Public School Districts: Conrad Weiser Area School District is in pink in the western part of the county.

Address
- 44 Big Spring Road Robesonia, Berks County and Lancaster County, Pennsylvania, 19551-8948; United States

District information
- Type: Public

Students and staff
- District mascot: Scout
- Colors: Blue and White

Other information
- Website: www.conradweiser.org

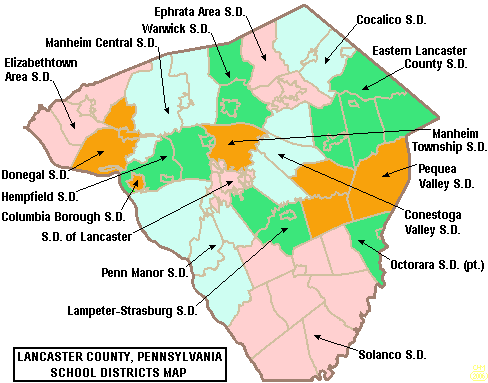
Conrad Weiser School District region in Lancaster County (not shown, but extends into a tiny portion of West Coalico Township.

The Conrad Weiser Area School District is located in western Berks County in the U.S. state of Pennsylvania. A tiny portion extends into Lancaster County. This district serves South Heidelberg Township, Heidelberg Township, North Heidelberg Township and Marion Township and the Boroughs of Wernersville, Robesonia and Womelsdorf. Eight properties in a housing development in West Cocalico in Lancaster County also attend the district's schools. The district encompasses approximately 100 square miles (260 km^{2}). According to 2000 federal census data, it serves a resident population of 23,777. By 2010, the district's population declined to 19,303 people. In 2009, Conrad Weiser Area School District residents’ per capita income was $22,732, while the median family income was $57,488. In the Commonwealth, the median family income was $49,501 and the United States median family income was $49,445, in 2010.

In the 1980s, a small group of Lancaster County property owners in the Cocalico School District were successful in seceding from the district. They formed a small district called Squire Hill Independent School District. The new District was short lived merging with Conrad Weiser Area School District.

Conrad Weiser Area School District operates four schools: Conrad Weiser High School (9th–12th), Conrad Weiser Middle School (5th–8th), Conrad Weiser East Elementary School (K-4th) and Conrad Weiser West Elementary School (K-4th).

The district is named for Conrad Weiser, an important Pennsylvanian in colonial days, especially known as an interpreter and emissary in councils between Native Americans and the colonies, especially Pennsylvania.

Conrad Weiser

== Extracurriculars ==
The district offers a wide variety of clubs, activities and an extensive sports program.

=== Sports ===
The district funds:

Boys

- Baseball - AAA
- Basketball- AAA
- Bowling - AAAA
- Cross Country - AA
- Football - AAA
- Golf - AAA
- Lacrosse - AAAA
- Soccer - AA
- Tennis - AAA
- Track and Field - AAA
- Wrestling - AAA

Girls

- Basketball - AAA
- Bowling - AAAA
- Cheerleading - AAAA
- Cross Country - AA
- Field Hockey - AA
- Golf - AAA
- Lacrosse - AAAA
- Soccer (Fall) - AA
- Softball - AAA
- Girls' Tennis - AAA
- Track and Field - AAA
- Volleyball - AA

Middle School Sports

Boys

- Baseball
- Basketball
- Cross Country
- Football
- Soccer
- Track and Field
- Wrestling

Girls

- Basketball
- Cheer
- Cross Country
- Field Hockey
- Soccer (fall)
- Softball
- Track and Field
- Volleyball
