= Kissling Farm =

- U.S. National Register of Historic Places
- U.S. Historic district
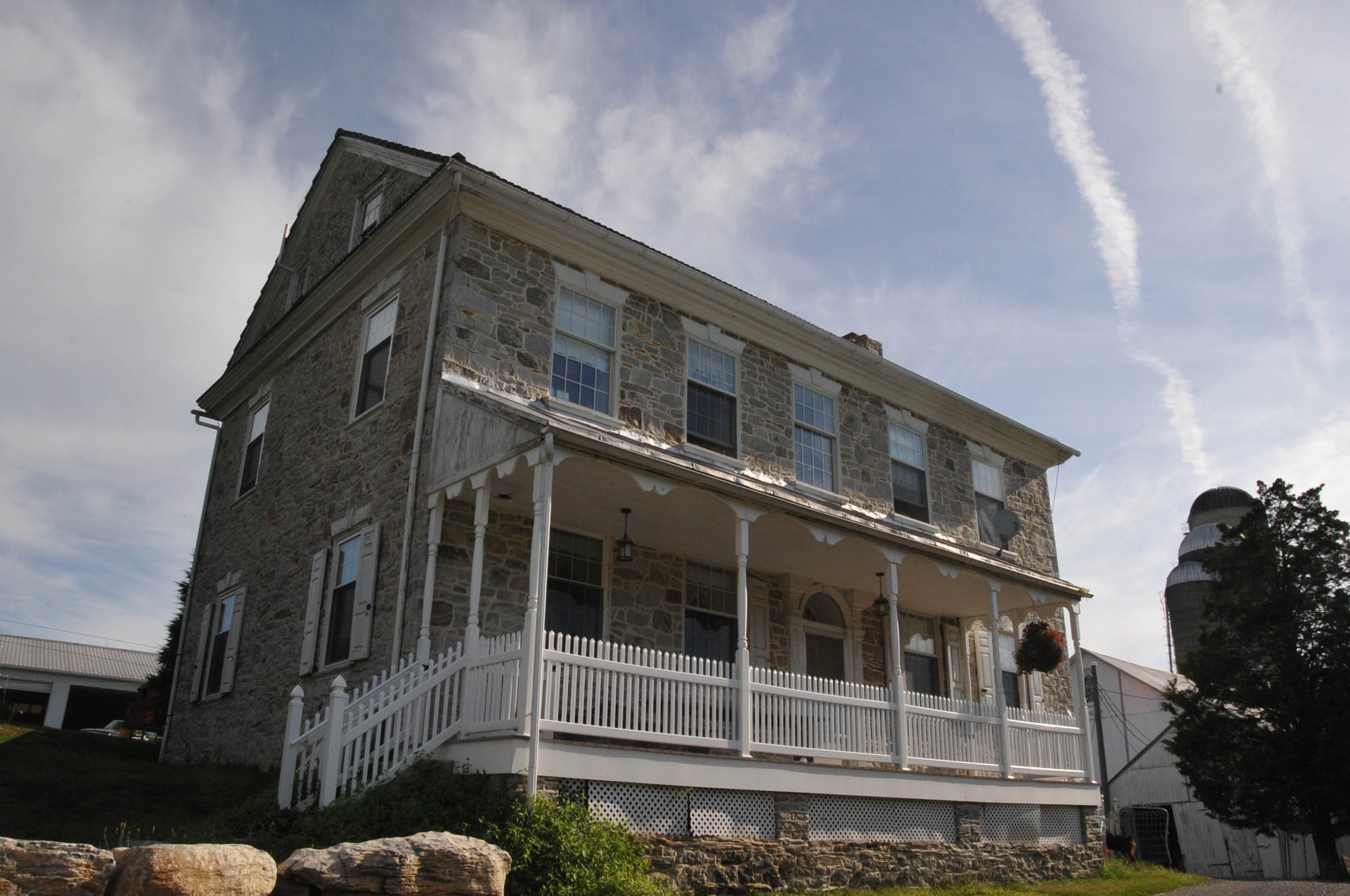

- Location within Pennsylvania Location within the United States
- Location: Brownsville Road east of Robesonia, Heidelberg Township, Pennsylvania
- Coordinates: 40°22′03″N 76°06′05″W
- Area: 220 acres (89 ha)
- Built: 1793, 1798, c. 1805, 1890
- Architectural style: Federal, Pennsylvania bank barn
- MPS: Farms in Berks County MPS
- NRHP reference No.: 92000934
- Added to NRHP: July 29, 1992

The Kissling Farm is a historic farm complex and national historic district located in Robesonia, Heidelberg Township, Berks County, Pennsylvania. It was listed on the National Register of Historic Places in 1992.

== History ==
During the late 18th century, this farm was owned by Peter Kule and his wife, Margretha, who sold the farm to Jacob Klobb (alternate spelling "Klopp") on April 6, 1786. When Klobb/Klopp died intestate on August 7, 1787, the property's two land tracts and distillery were sold by the local Orphans' Court to his sons, John, Jacob and Peter Klobb/Klopp. The property and its buildings were then resold in 1815 to John Bechtle, who was forced by financial circumstances to sell the property during a Sheriff's sale in 1824. Purchased by Jacob and Daniel Bechtle at that time, they sold their shares to John Kalbach, respectively, in 1831 and 1839. Kalbach then sold the property to his son, John, in 1843. Following his death two years later, the property was transferred to Joseph Kalbach, who then sold it to Benjamin Lamm in 1846. After working the land for more than two decades, Lamm died in 1869; the farm was then purchased by Amandon Kissling for $13,000. The farm then remained in the Kissling family's hands between that time and the time that the property was nominated for placement on the National Register of Historic Places in 1991.

=== Placement on the National Register of Historic Places ===
The nomination form to place this property on the National Register of Historic Places was completed by Mary Ellen Lash, a consultant with the Berks County Conservancy in Wyomissing, Pennsylvania in June 1991. This property and its buildings were then officially listed on the National Register of Historic Places in 1992.

== Architectural features ==
The Kissling Farm complex has seven contributing buildings, one contributing site, and three contributing structures. They are a 2 1/2-story, five-bay, vernacular Federal stone farmhouse with kitchen ell addition (1798, c. 1805); frame Pennsylvania bank barn on a limestone foundation (1890); 1 1/2-story stone cabin (1793); four stone and frame outbuildings; and three structures.
