= Stouchsburg Historic District =

Historic district in Pennsylvania, United States

- U.S. National Register of Historic Places
- U.S. Historic district
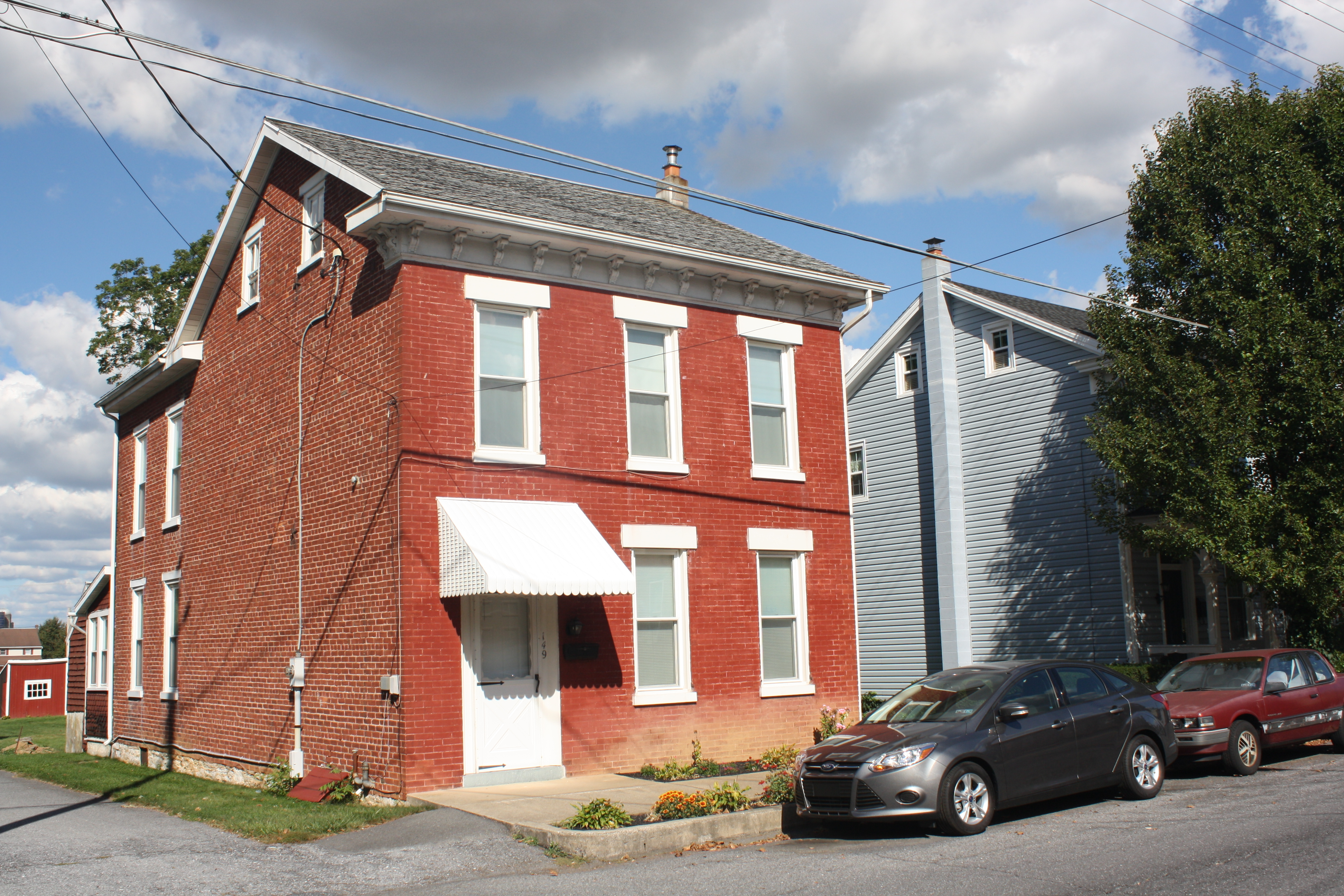
- 149 Main Street

- Location within Pennsylvania Location within the United States
- Location: 12–153 Main St., and Water St., Stouchsburg, Marion Township, Pennsylvania
- Coordinates: 40°21′47″N 76°11′13″W
- Area: 47 acres (19 ha)
- Architectural style: Pennsylvania German Vern.
- NRHP reference No.: 85000071
- Added to NRHP: January 8, 1985

The Stouchsburg Historic District is a national historic district that is located in Stouchsburg, Marion Township, Berks County, Pennsylvania.

It was listed on the National Register of Historic Places in 1985.

== History and architectural features ==
This district encompasses ninety-one contributing buildings that are located in the borough of Stouchsburg. It includes residential, commercial, and institutional buildings that are typical of Pennsylvania German architecture.

Notable buildings include the separately listed Peter Spycker House (c. 1750), the Marion House inn (c. 1830), the American House hotel (1871), the Samuel Keiser General Store and Post Office (c. 1866), Reeds' Church (1895), and the Marion Township Fire Hall (1916).

== Gallery ==
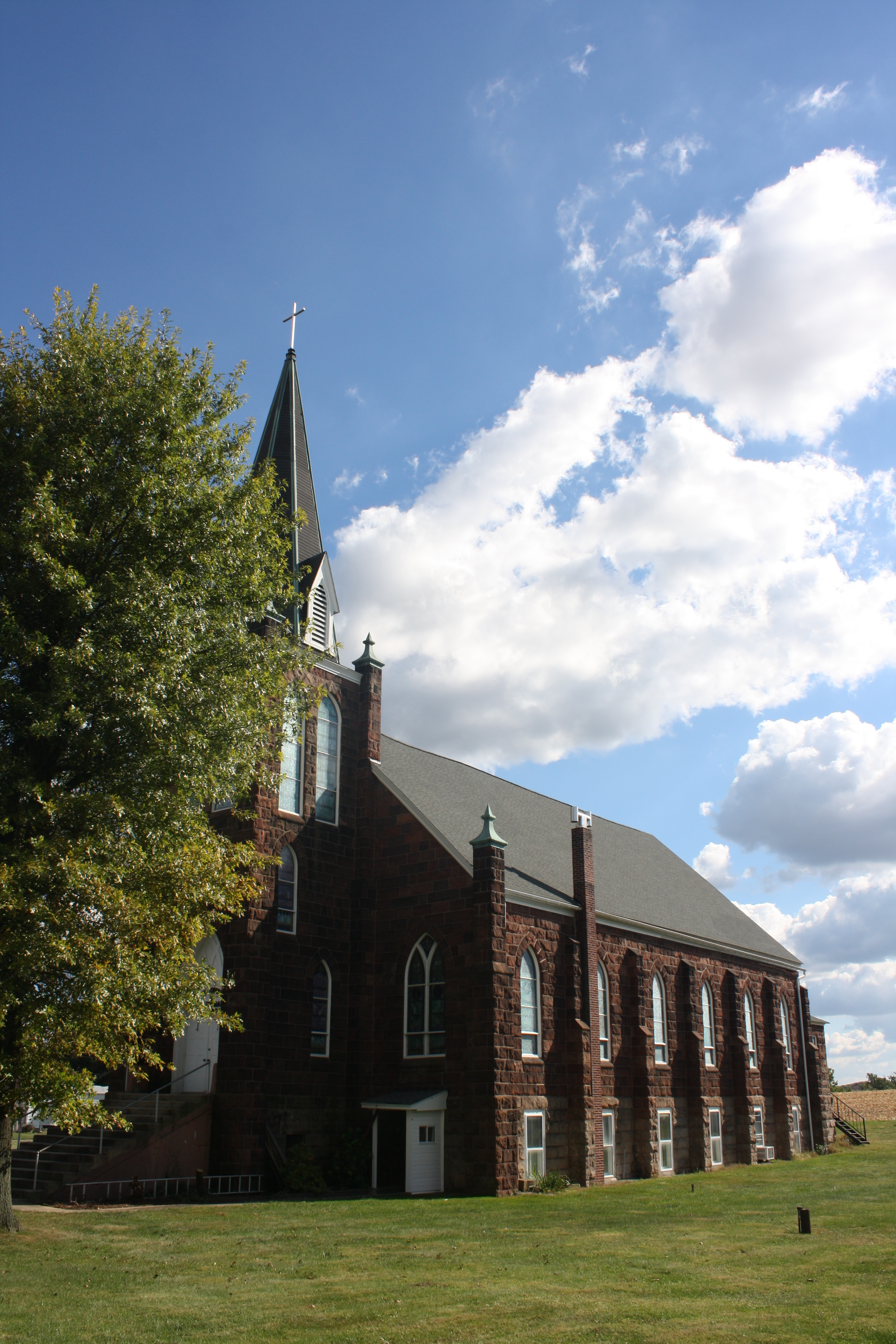
Zion & St. John's Reeds Lutheran Church

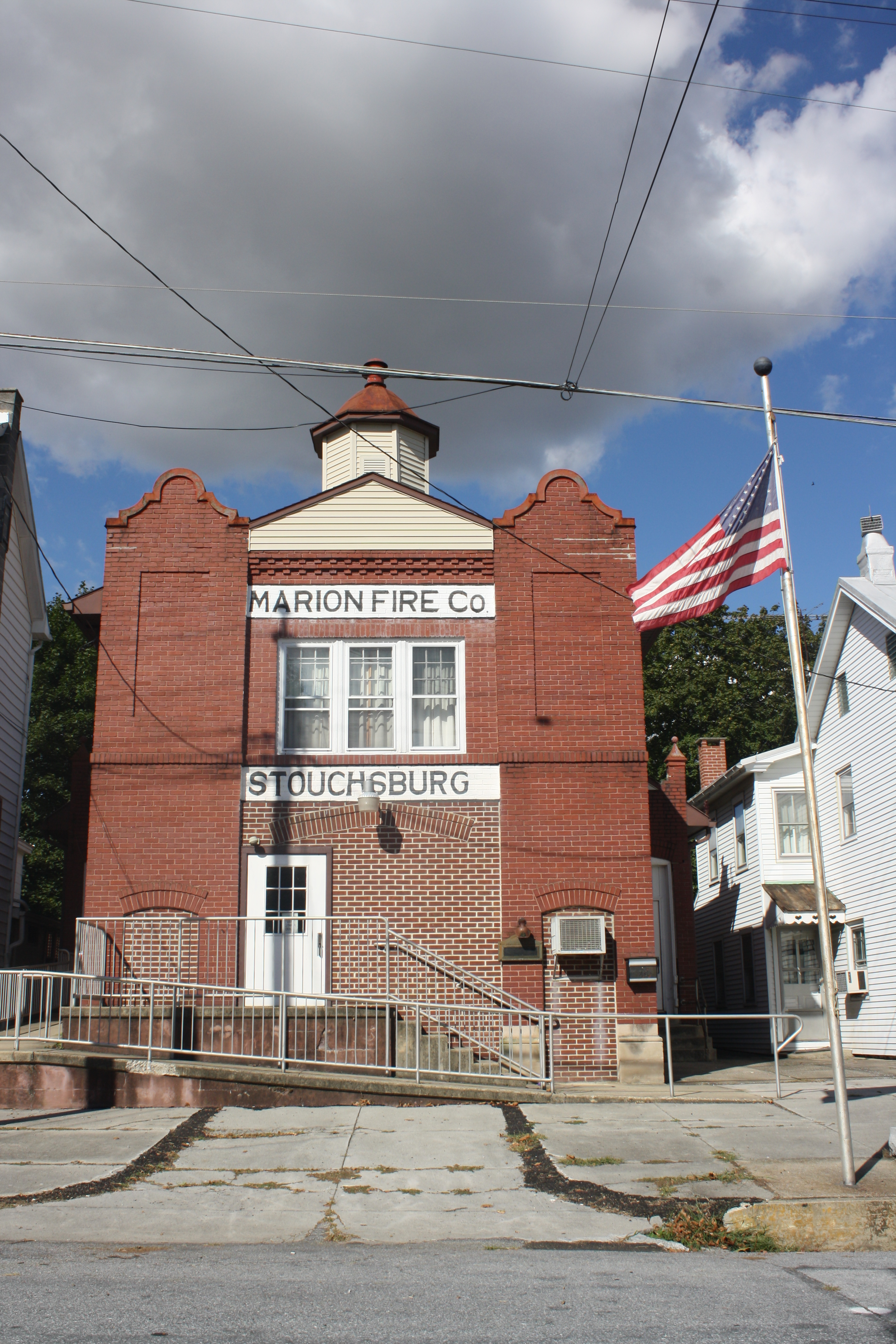
Marion Fire Company

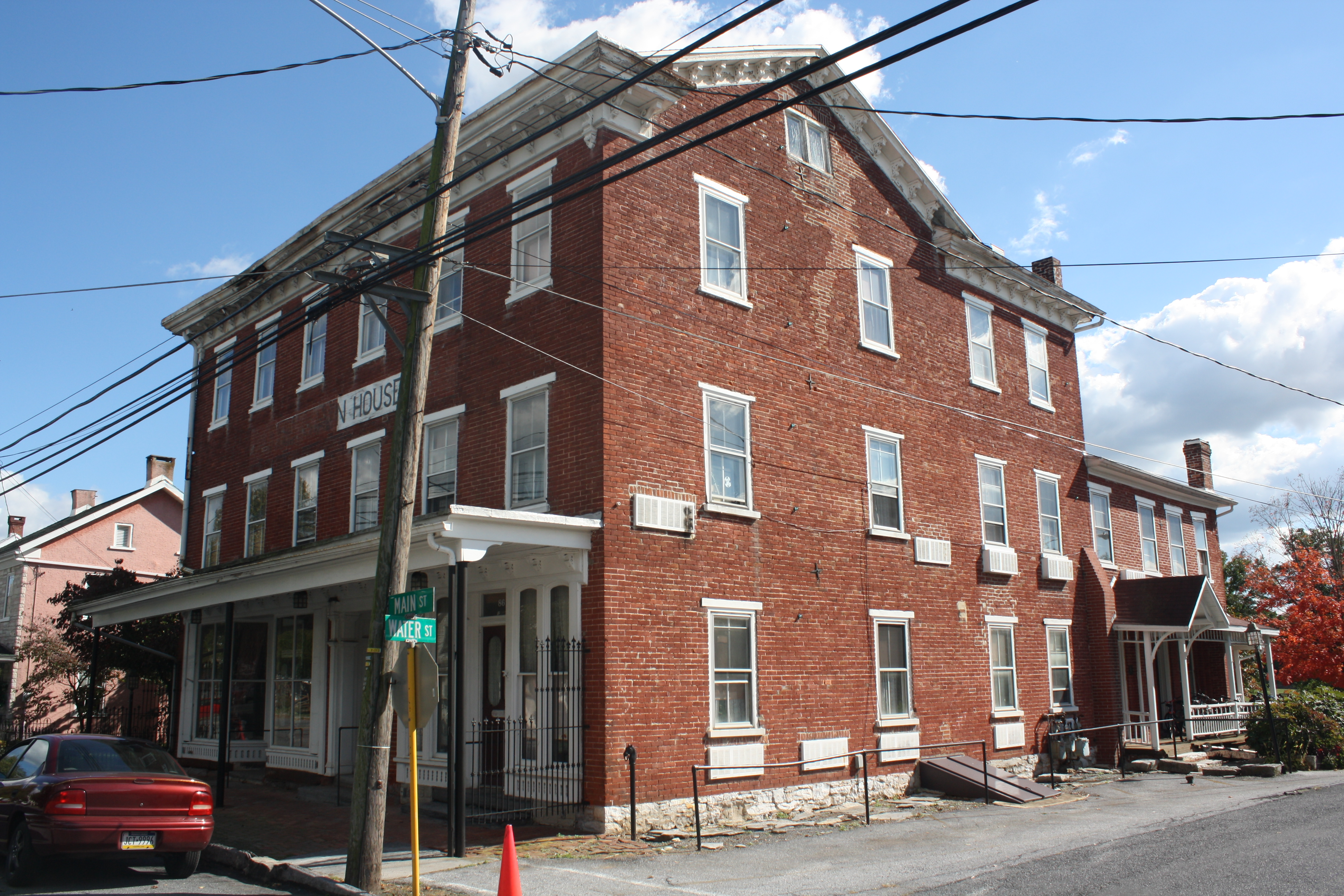
Former American House hotel

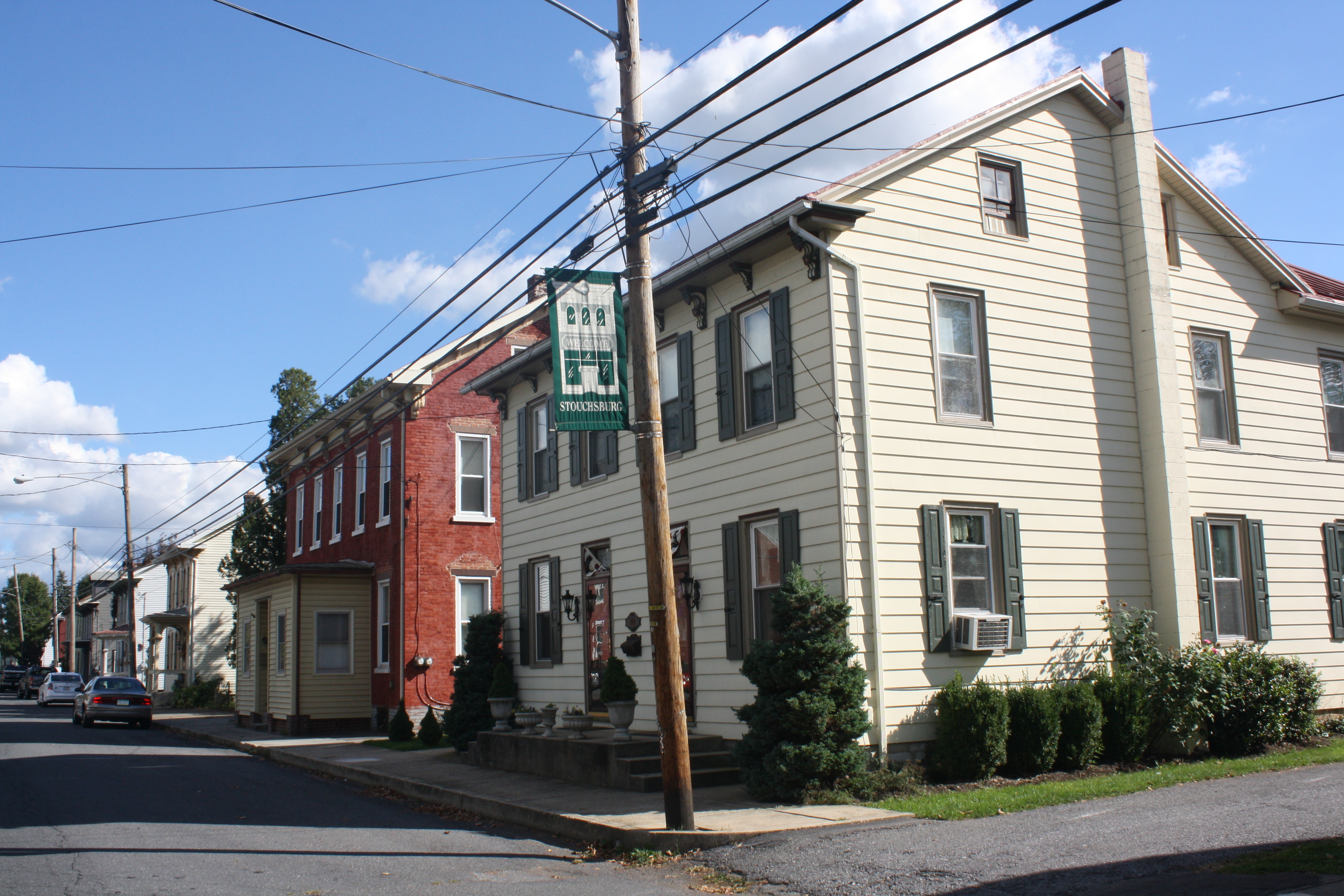
Main Street, west end

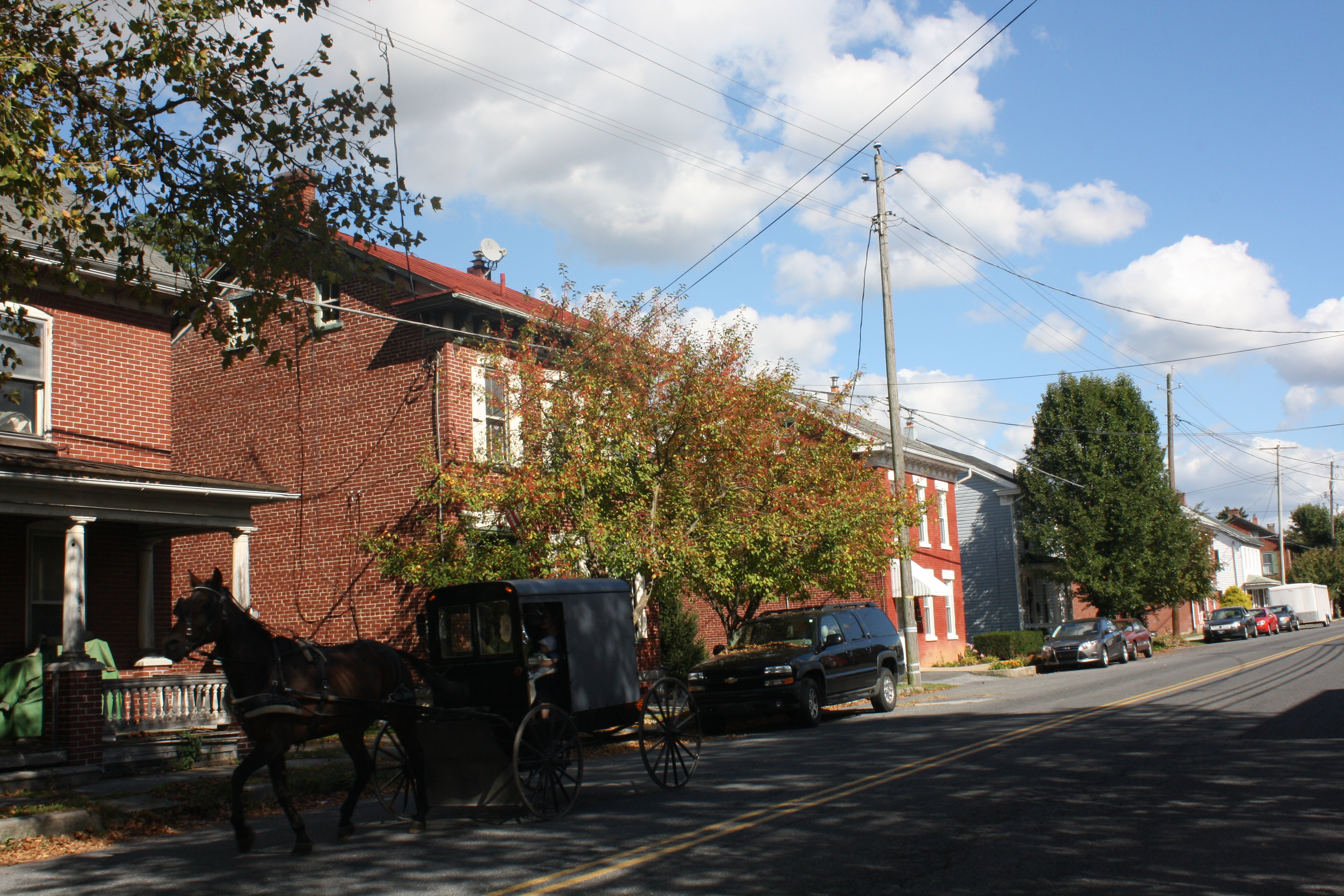
Amish buggy on Main Street
