= Robesonia Furnace Historic District =

Historic district in Pennsylvania, United States

- U.S. National Register of Historic Places
- U.S. Historic district
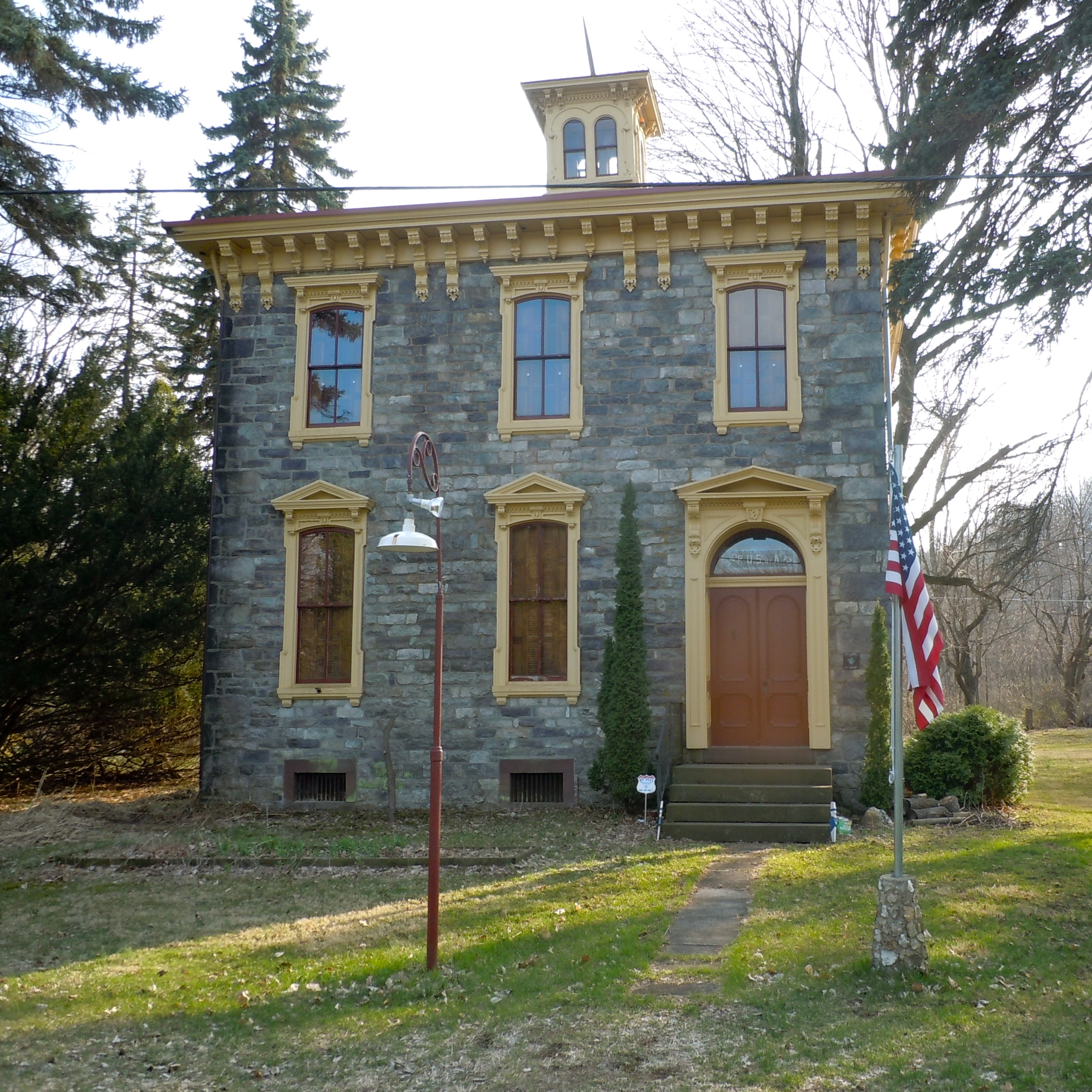
- Furnace Office, April 2011

- Location within Pennsylvania Location within the United States
- Location: Furnace, S. Church and Freeman Sts. and Mountain and E. Meadow Aves., Robesonia, Pennsylvania
- Coordinates: 40°20′34″N 76°08′26″W
- Area: 70 acres (28 ha)
- Architectural style: Second Empire, Georgian, Italianate
- MPS: Iron and Steel Resources of Pennsylvania MPS
- NRHP reference No.: 91001128
- Added to NRHP: September 6, 1991

The Robesonia Furnace Historic District, also known as the Reading Furnace and the Robesonia Iron Co. Ltd., is an historic iron plantation and national historic district in Robesonia, Berks County, Pennsylvania, United States.

It was listed on the National Register of Historic Places in 1991.

== History and architectural features ==
This district encompasses thirty-five contributing buildings and two contributing sites. They include a series of one-and-one-half-story, single workers' houses that were built circa 1825, a set of stone, frame and slag block duplexes that were built circa 1845, 1890 and 1910, and bungalows that were built roughly between 1913 and 1915.

Other notable buildings are the Second Empire-style George Taylor Mansion (c. 1880), a creamery building, a shed with a cupola, a log-and-stone furnace boarding house (c. 1800), a miller's house (c. 1820), a fire station (c. 1910), a Georgian-style ironmaster's mansion that is also known as Ege Mansion (c. 1807), and an Italianate-style furnace office.

The contributing sites are the industrial remains of the Robesonia Furnace, which was established in 1794 by George Ege and then demolished in 1927 after its acquisition by Bethlehem Steel.
