= S Bridge (Womelsdorf, Pennsylvania) =

- U.S. National Register of Historic Places
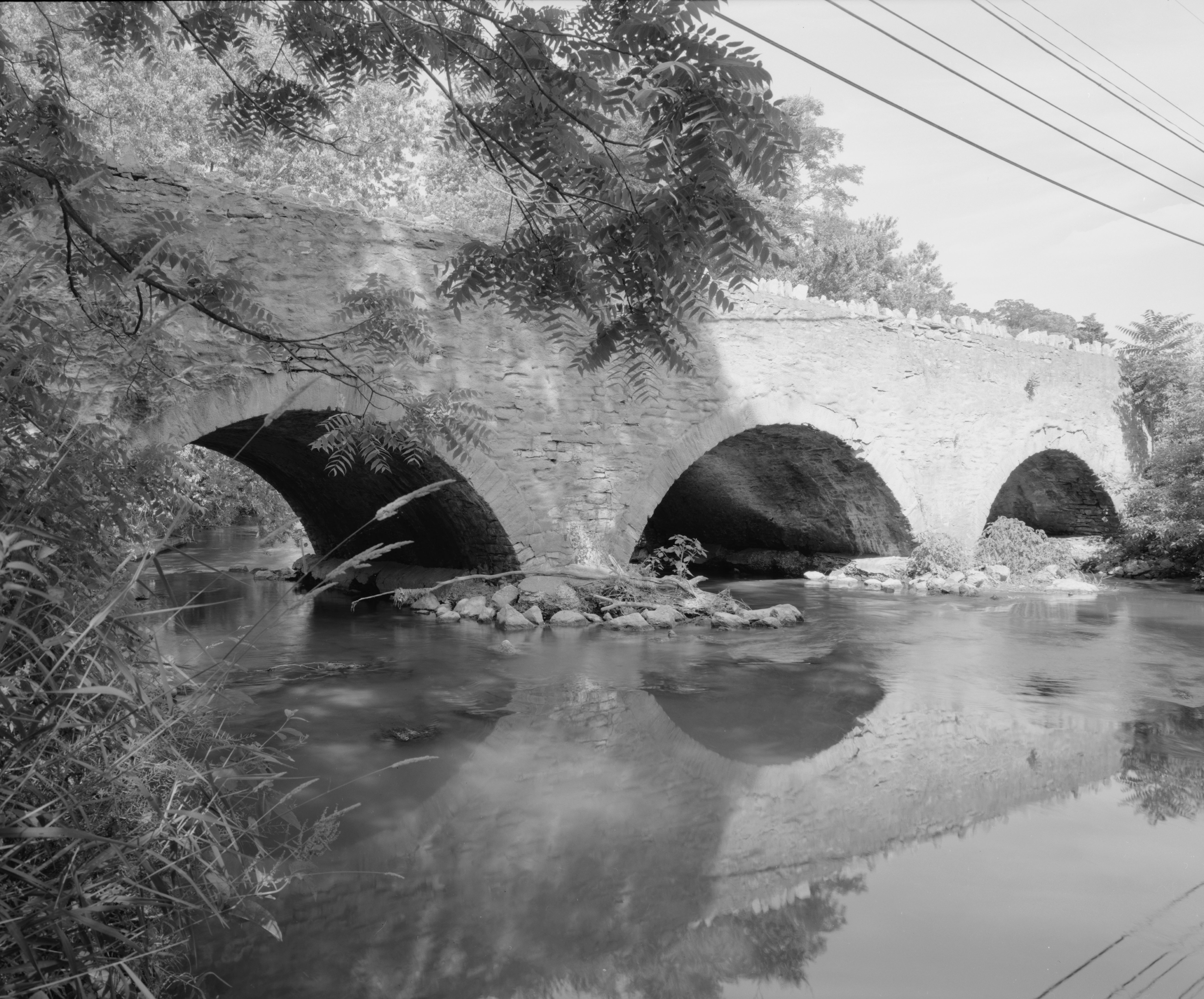
- S Bridge in Marion Township, Pennsylvania, 1997

- Location within Pennsylvania Location within the United States
- Location: Legislative Route 06024 over Tulpehocken Creek west of Womelsdorf, Marion Township, Pennsylvania, U.S.
- Coordinates: 40°22′24″N 76°13′6″W
- Area: less than one acre
- Built: 1919
- Architectural style: Multi-span stone arch
- MPS: Highway Bridges Owned by the Commonwealth of Pennsylvania, Department of Transportation TR
- NRHP reference No.: 88000794
- Added to NRHP: June 22, 1988

The S Bridge was an historic stone arch bridge that was located in Marion Township in Berks County, Pennsylvania, United States.

It was listed on the National Register of Historic Places in 1988.

== History and notable features ==
This historic structure was a multiple span 230-foot-long (70 m), stone arch bridge with three spans. Built in 1919, it spanned Tulpehocken Creek.

In 2001, the bridge was closed when one of the bridge walls began to separate from an arch. After a decade of disuse, it was demolished and replaced with a concrete span in 2011.

== See also ==
- List of bridges documented by the Historic American Engineering Record in Pennsylvania
