= G. Gilbert Snyder =

George Gilbert Snyder (June 15, 1897 – November 17, 1956) was an American German Reformed layman and prominent author and radio broadcaster in the Pennsylvania German language. He was born in Stouchsburg, Pennsylvania. His dialect pseudonym was Die Wunnernaus vun Baricks Kaundi (the busybody from Berks County). Alternative spellings include Wunnernaas, Wundernaus, and Wunnernaws. Snyder was a high school principal and school supervisor in Berks County.

Snyder died of a coronary embolism in Robesonia, Pennsylvania and is buried in the Tulpehocken Trinity Cemetery in Lebanon County, Pennsylvania.
