= Peter Spicker House =

Historic house in Pennsylvania, United States

- U.S. National Register of Historic Places
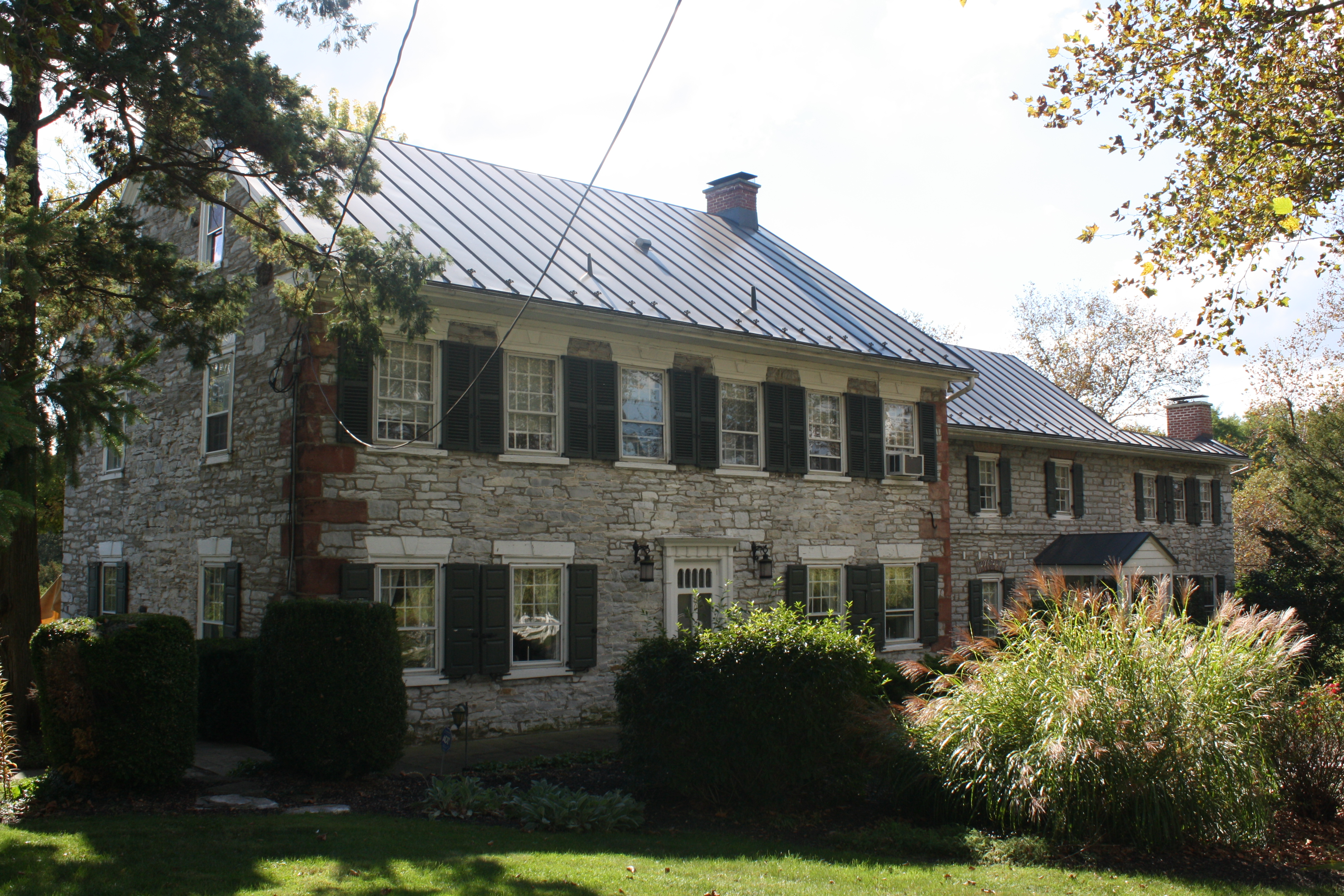
- Peter Spicker House, September 2013

- Location within Pennsylvania Location within the United States
- Location: 160 Main St., Stouchsburg, Marion Township, Pennsylvania
- Coordinates: 40°22′52″N 76°14′13″W
- Area: 2.9 acres (1.2 ha)
- Built: c. 1740, c. 1750, c. 1800
- Architectural style: Georgian, Pennsylvania German
- NRHP reference No.: 83002217
- Added to NRHP: April 22, 1983

The Peter Spicker House is an historic home that is located in Stouchsburg, Marion Township, Berks County, Pennsylvania, United States.

Located in the Stouchsburg Historic District, it was listed on the National Register of Historic Places in 1983.

== History and architectural features ==
This historic structure is a native limestone dwelling. Its first section was built circa 1740, with the central portion added circa 1750 and the eastern section circa 1800. It is reflective of the transition from the Germanic to the Georgian style.

The oldest section is 1 1/2 stories and three bays wide. The central section is 2 1/2 stories and also three bays wide, with a gable and pent roof. The eastern section is also 2 1/2 stories, six bays wide, with a gable roof. Also located on the property is a late-eighteenth century, stone, Pennsylvania German bank barn.

It was listed on the National Register of Historic Places in 1983. It is located in the Stouchsburg Historic District.

== Gallery ==
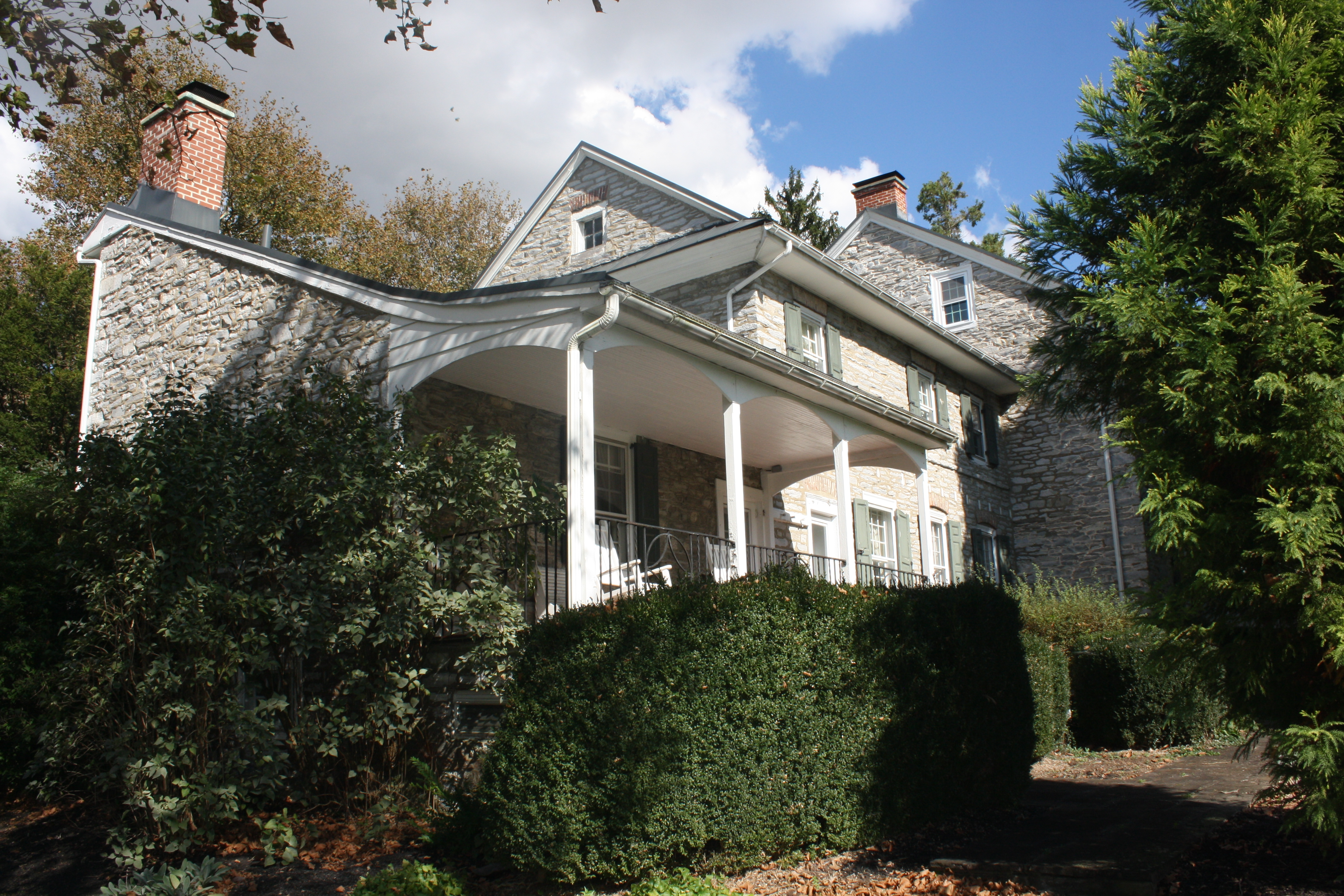
Oldest part of the house (1740).

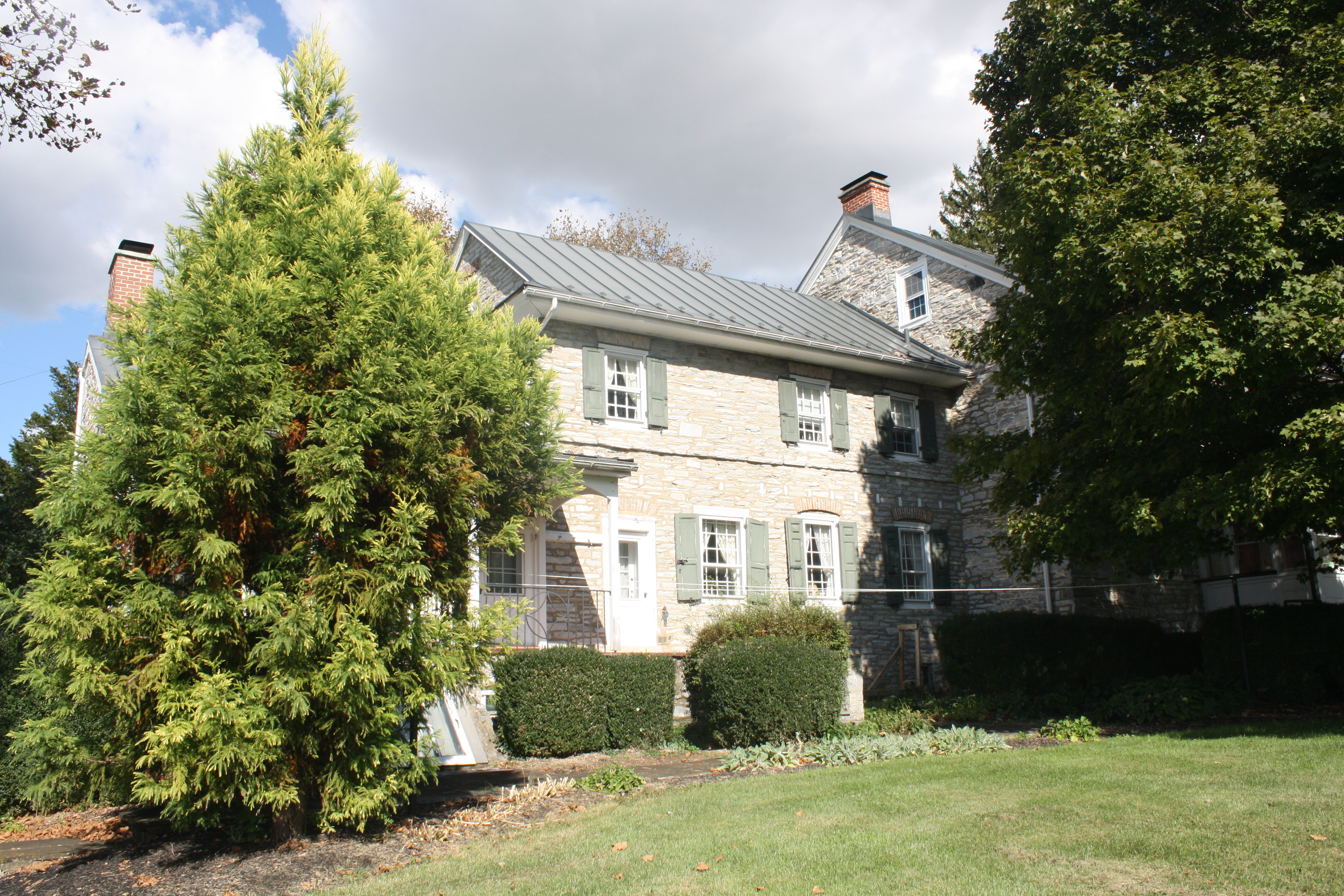
Central portion (1750).

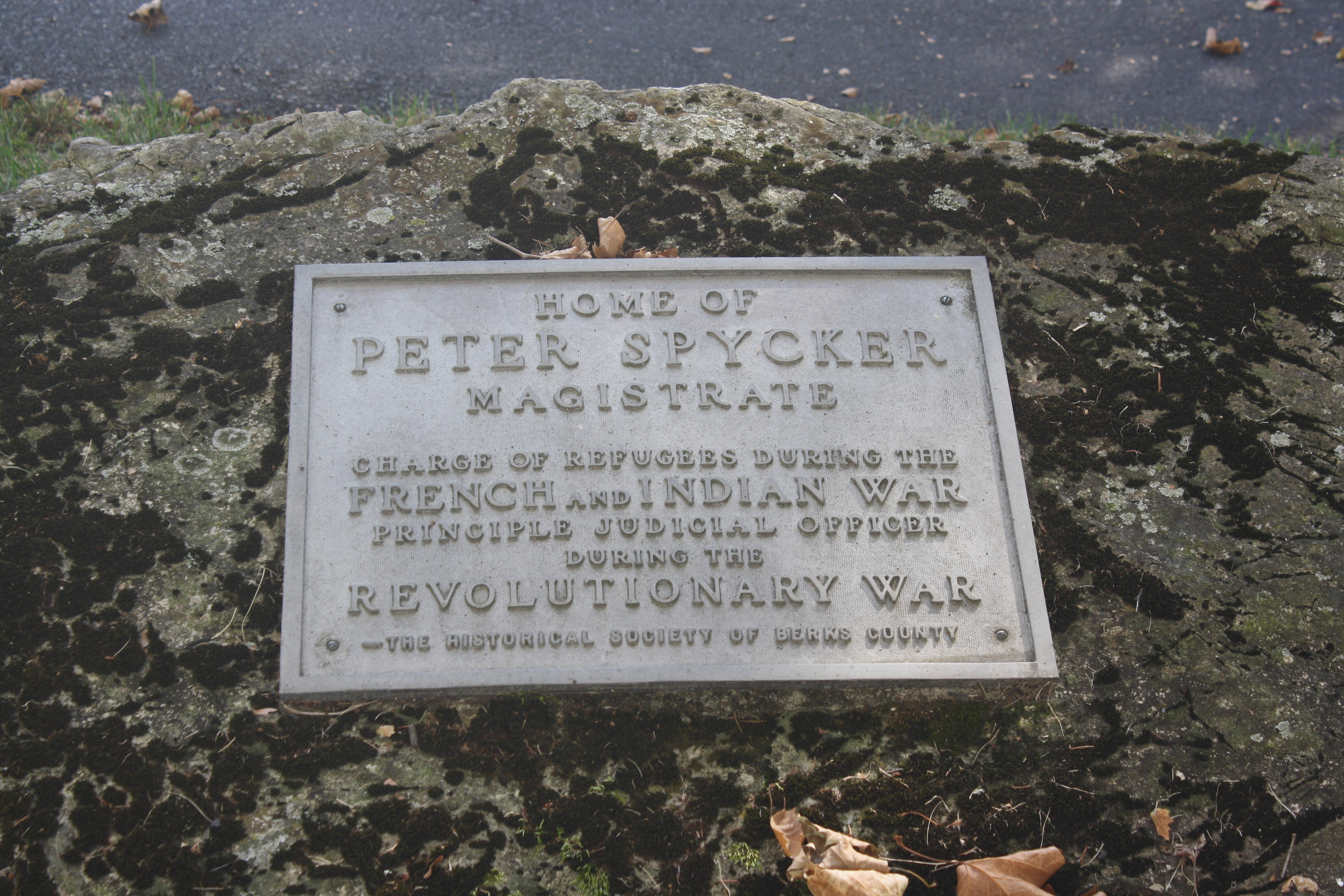
Home of Peter Spicker memorial plaque.

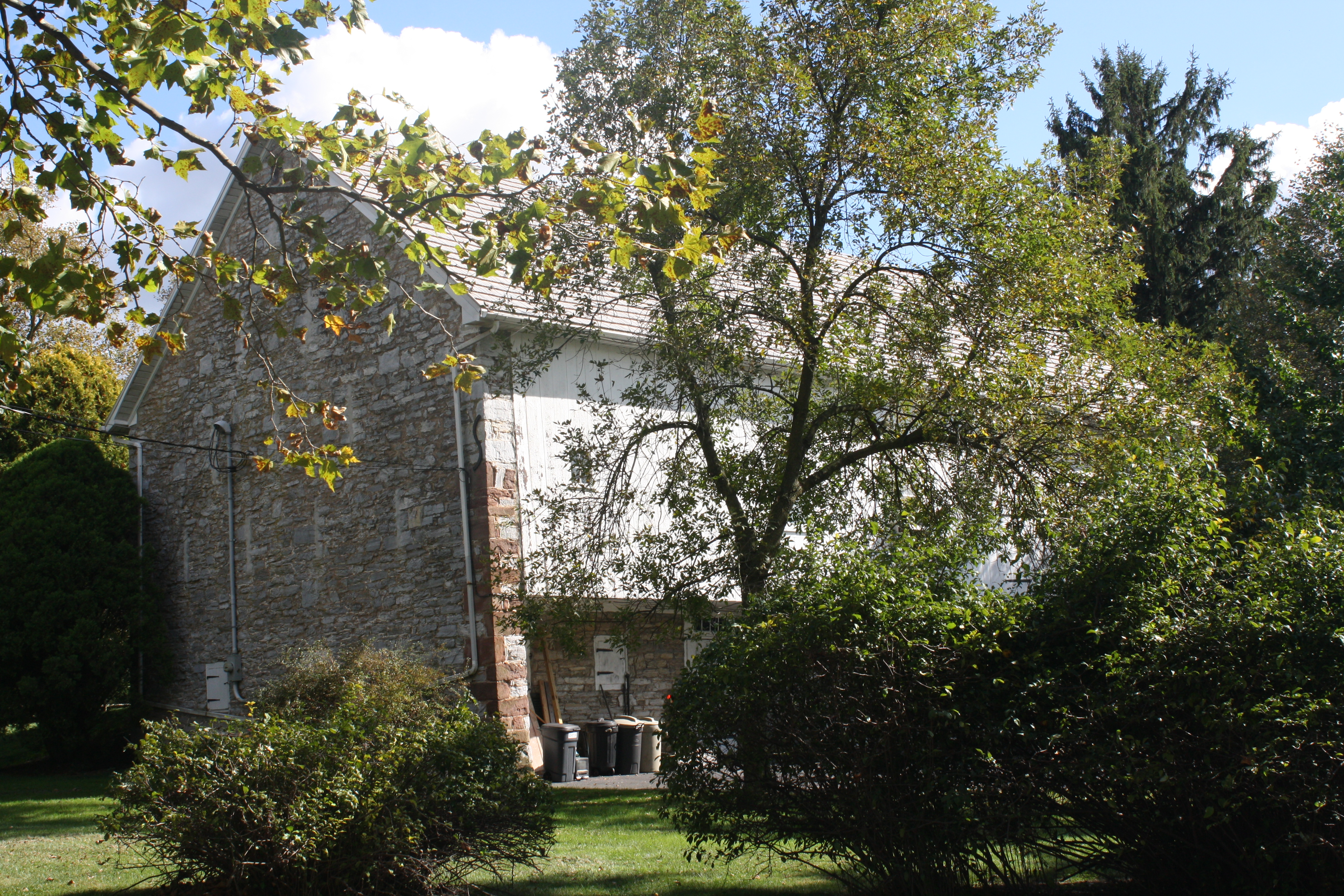
Barn, west side.

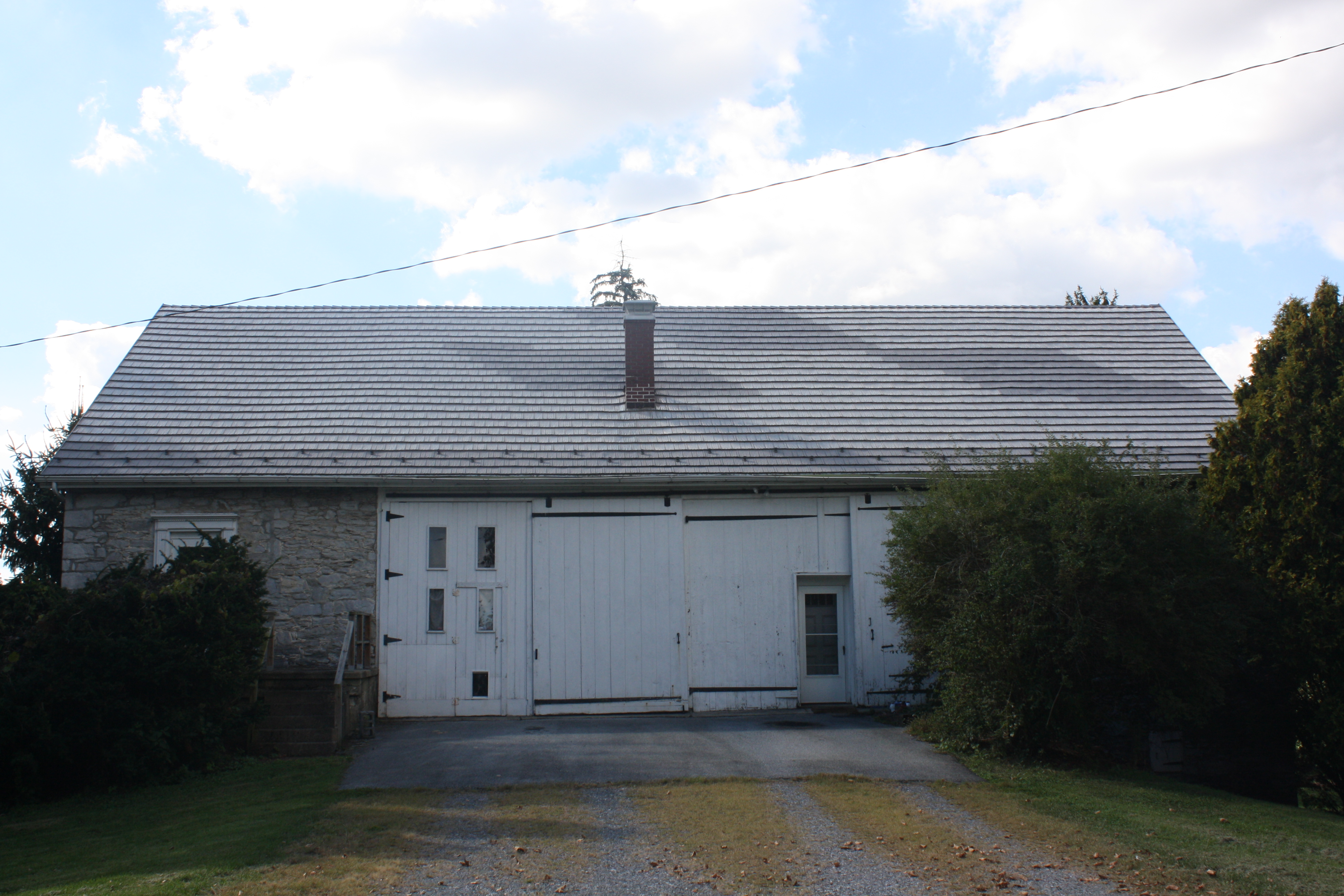
Barn, east banked ramp.
