= Marion Township, Berks County, Pennsylvania =

Township in Pennsylvania, US

Marion Township
- Township
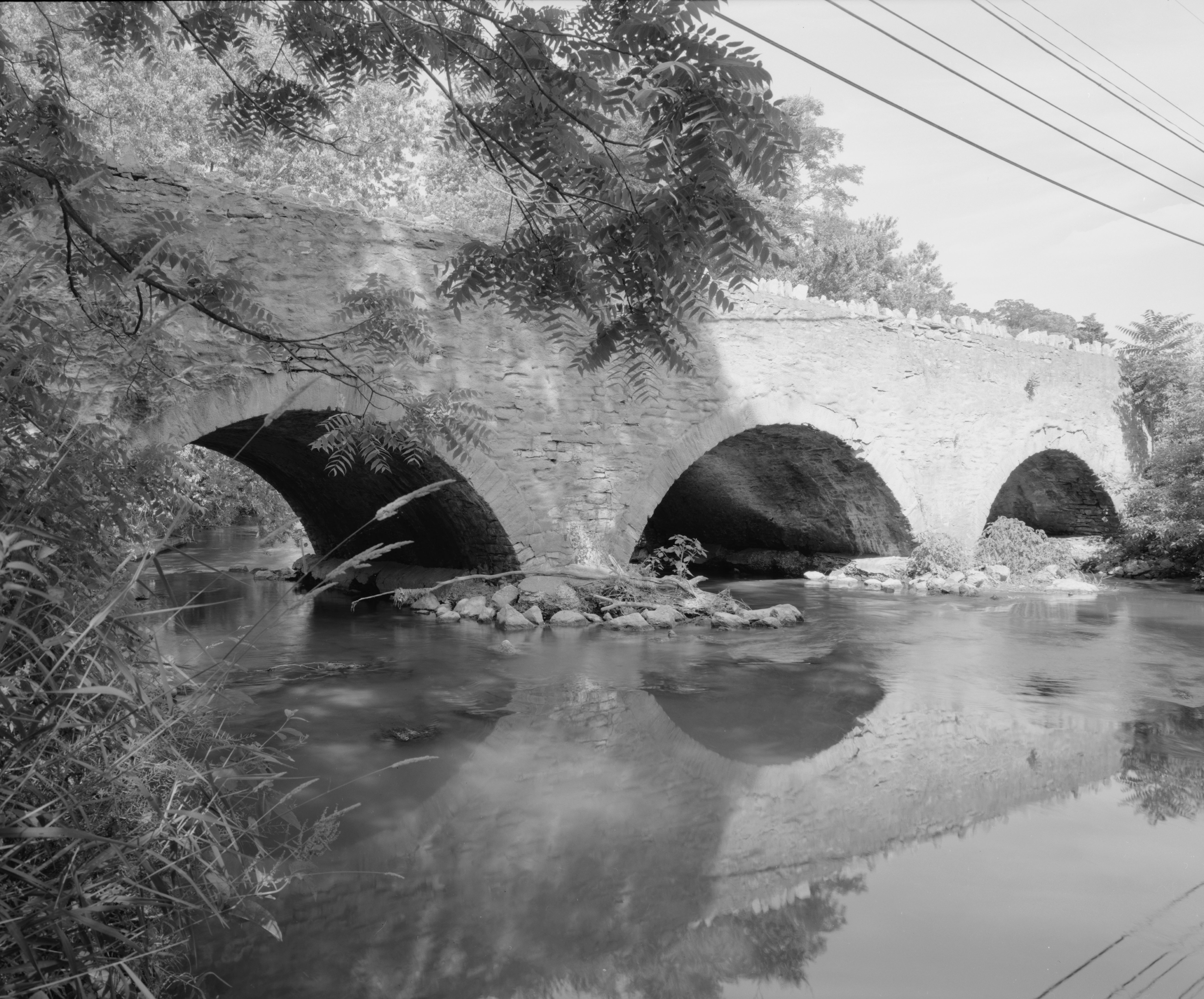
- S Bridgein Marion Township

- Location of Marion Township in Pennsylvania Marion Township (the United States)
- Coordinates: 40°23′00″N 76°15′29″W
- Country: United States
- State: Pennsylvania
- County: Berks

Area
  - Total: 15.13 sq mi (39.19 km^{2})
  - Land: 15.09 sq mi (39.07 km^{2})
  - Water: 0.046 sq mi (0.12 km^{2})
- Elevation: 404 ft (123 m)

Population (2010)
  - Total: 1,688
  - Estimate (2016): 1,839
  - Density: 121.9/sq mi (47.07/km^{2})
- Time zone: UTC-5 (EST)
  - Summer (DST): UTC-4 (EDT)
- Area codes: 610, 717
- FIPS code: 42-011-47440
- Website: https://www.mariontwpberks.com/

Marion Township is a township in Berks County, Pennsylvania, United States. The population was 1,695 at the 2023 5-Year American Community Survey.

== History ==
The S Bridge (Womelsdorf, Pennsylvania), Peter Spicker House, Stouchsburg Historic District, and Tulpehocken Creek Historic District are listed on the National Register of Historic Places.

== Geography ==
According to the U.S. Census Bureau, the township has a total area of 15.3 square miles (39.7 km^{2}), of which 15.3 square miles (39.7 km^{2}) is land and 0.07% is water.

=== Adjacent townships ===
- Tulpehocken Township (north)
- Jefferson Township (northeast)
- North Heidelberg Township (east)
- Heidelberg Township (southeast)
- Millcreek Township, Lebanon County (south)
- Jackson Township, Lebanon County (west)

The borough of Womelsdorf is adjacent to Marion Township on the south side. The unincorporated community of Stouchsburg is located within the township, just off U.S. Route 422.

== Demographics ==
Historical population
Census	Pop.	Note	%±
1980	1,341		—
1990	1,415		5.5%
2000	1,573		11.2%
2010	1,688		7.3%
2016 (est.)	1,839		8.9%
Source: US Census Bureau

As of the 2000 census, there were 1,573 people, 524 households and 418 families living in the township. The population density was 102.6 inhabitants per square mile (39.6/km^{2}). There were 551 housing units at an average density of 36.0 per square mile (13.9/km^{2}). The racial makeup of the township was 97.20% White, 1.02% African American, 0.38% Native American, 0.13% Asian, 0.45% from other races, and 0.83% from two or more races. Hispanic or Latino of any race were 1.40% of the population.

There were 524 households, of which 35.5% had children under the age of 18 living with them, 67.4% were married couples living together, 8.0% had a female householder with no husband present, and 20.2% were non-families. 14.9% of all households were made up of individuals, and 5.9% had someone living alone who was 65 years of age or older. The average household size was 2.98 and the average family size was 3.36.

In the township, the population was spread out, with 28.6% under the age of 18, 8.4% from 18 to 24, 27.3% from 25 to 44, 25.2% from 45 to 64, and 10.6% who were 65 years of age or older. The median age was 36 years. For every 100 females there were 113.1 males. For every 100 females age 18 and over, there were 106.1 males.

The median income for a household in the township was $47,396, and the median income for a family was $52,167. Males had a median income of $35,517 compared with $22,179 for females. The per capita income for the township was $19,373. About 2.2% of families and 3.3% of the population were below the poverty line, including 3.3% of those under age 18 and 3.6% of those age 65 or over.

== Transportation ==
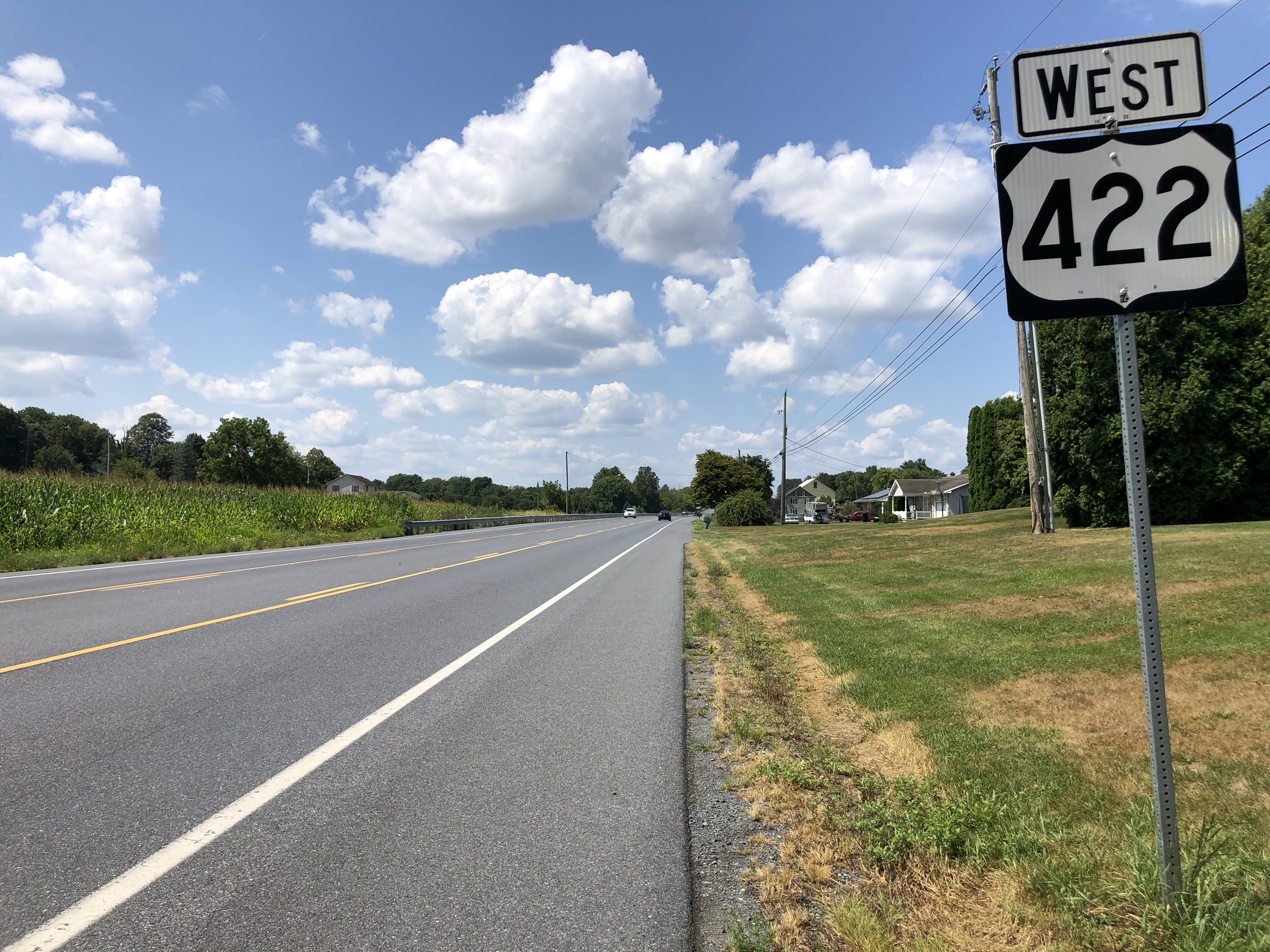
US 422 westbound in Marion Township

As of 2007, there were 41.88 miles (67.40 km) of public roads in Marion Township, of which 8.30 miles (13.36 km) were maintained by the Pennsylvania Department of Transportation (PennDOT) and 33.58 miles (54.04 km) were maintained by the township.

U.S. Route 422, Pennsylvania Route 419 and Pennsylvania Route 501 are the numbered highways serving Marion Township. US 422 follows Conrad Weiser Parkway along an east-west alignment across the southern portion of the township. PA 419 follows Rehrersburg Road along a north-south alignment across the eastern part of the township. Finally, PA 501 clips the far northwestern corner of the township.
