= Heidelberg Township, Berks County, Pennsylvania =

Township in Pennsylvania, US

Heidelberg Township
- Township
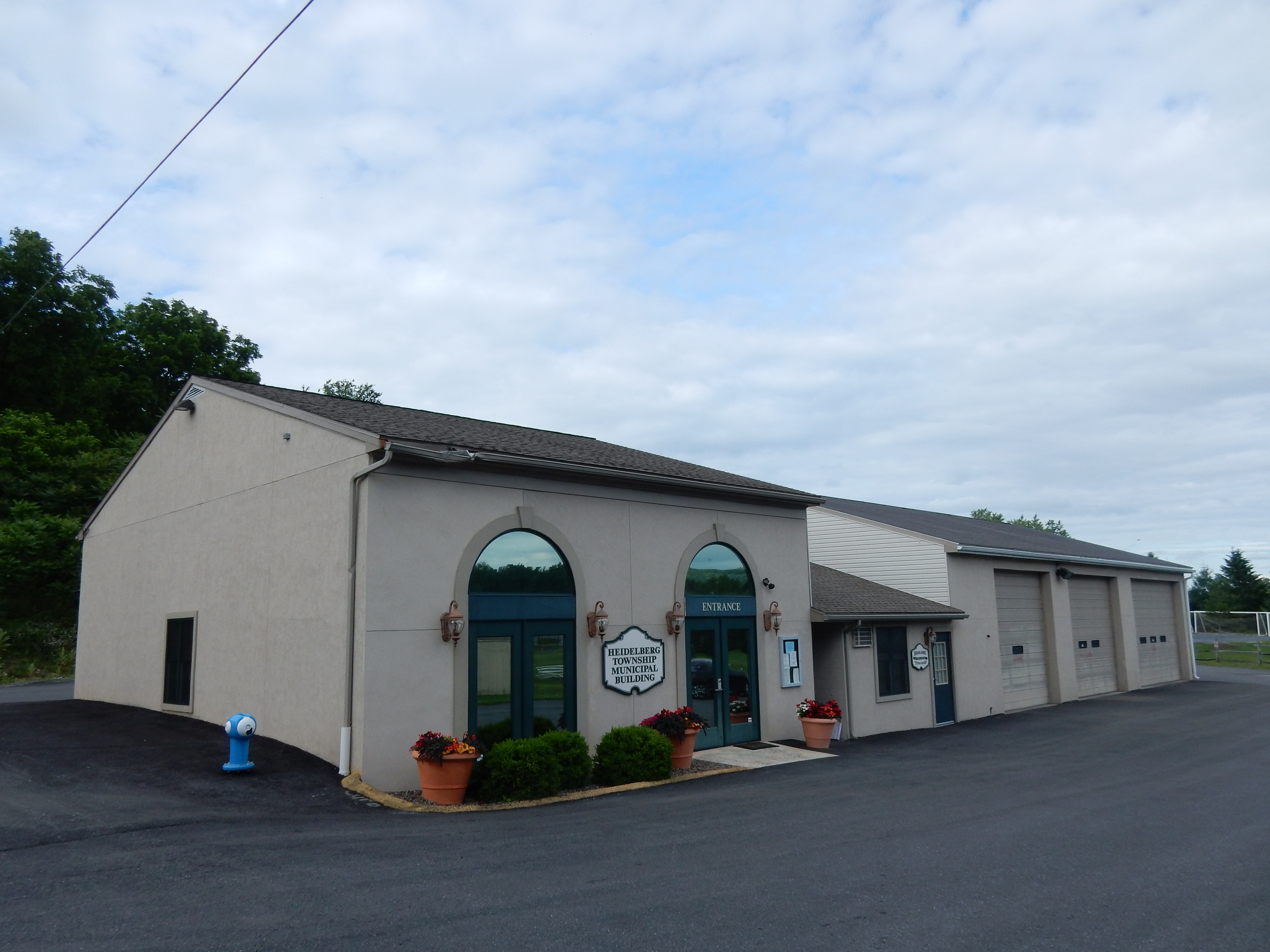
- Town hall

- Location of Heidelberg Township in Pennsylvania Heidelberg Township (the United States)
- Coordinates: 40°22′36″N 76°07′59″W
- Country: United States
- State: Pennsylvania
- County: Berks
- Founded: 1734

Area
  - Total: 14.30 sq mi (37.04 km^{2})
  - Land: 14.24 sq mi (36.88 km^{2})
  - Water: 0.062 sq mi (0.16 km^{2})
- Elevation: 492 ft (150 m)

Population (2020)
  - Total: 1,726 ▲
  - Estimate (2021): 1,723
  - Density: 122.0/sq mi (47.09/km^{2})
- Time zone: UTC-5 (EST)
  - Summer (DST): UTC-4 (EDT)
- Area code: 610
- FIPS code: 42-011-33600
- Website: www.heidelbergtownship.org

Heidelberg Township is a township in Berks County, Pennsylvania, United States. The population was 1,726 at the 2020 census.

== History ==
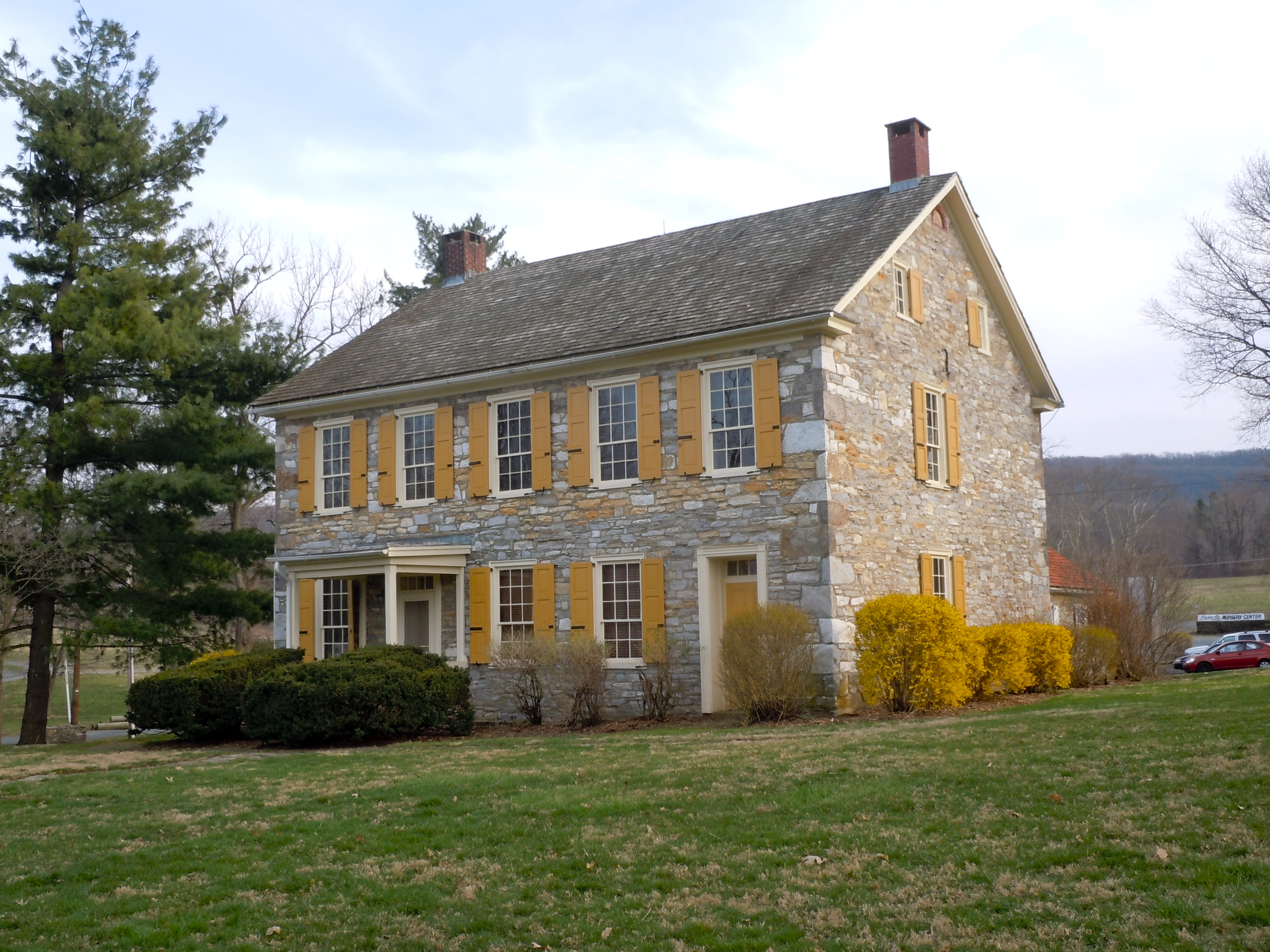
Conrad Weiser Homestead

The Kissling Farm and Conrad Weiser House are listed on the National Register of Historic Places.

== Geography ==
According to the U.S. Census Bureau, the township has a total area of 14.3 square miles (37 km^{2}), of which 14.3 square miles (37 km^{2}) is land and 0.07% is water.

Adjacent townships

- Marion Township (west)
- North Heidelberg Township (north)
- Lower Heidelberg Township (east)
- South Heidelberg Township (southeast)
- Millcreek Township, Lebanon County (southwest)

Adjacent boroughs

- Robesonia (surrounded)
- Womelsdorf (west)

== Demographics ==
Historical population
Census	Pop.	Note	%±
1980	1,561		—
1990	1,513		−3.1%
2000	1,636		8.1%
2010	1,724		5.4%
2020	1,726		0.1%
2021 (est.)	1,723		−0.2%
Source: US Census Bureau

At the 2000 census, there were 1,636 people, 587 households, and 464 families living in the township. The population density was 114.1 inhabitants per square mile (44.1/km^{2}). There were 613 housing units at an average density of 42.8 per square mile (16.5/km^{2}). The racial makeup of the township was 94.25% White, 2.57% African American, 0.79% Asian, 1.77% from other races, and 0.61% from two or more races. Hispanic or Latino of any race were 1.65%.

There were 587 households, 31.5% had children under the age of 18 living with them, 71.7% were married couples living together, 4.8% had a female householder with no husband present, and 20.8% were non-families. 17.5% of households were made up of individuals, and 8.3% were one person aged 65 or older. The average household size was 2.63 and the average family size was 2.99.

The age distribution was 27.9% under the age of 18, 5.1% from 18 to 24, 27.2% from 25 to 44, 27.0% from 45 to 64, and 12.8% 65 or older. The median age was 39 years. For every 100 females, there were 97.1 males. For every 100 females age 18 and over, there were 98.0 males.

The median household income was $51,641 and the median family income was $57,422. Males had a median income of $37,105 versus $27,315 for females. The per capita income for the township was $22,291. About 2.6% of families and 5.0% of the population were below the poverty line, including 8.6% of those under age 18 and 4.2% of those age 65 or over.

== Transportation ==
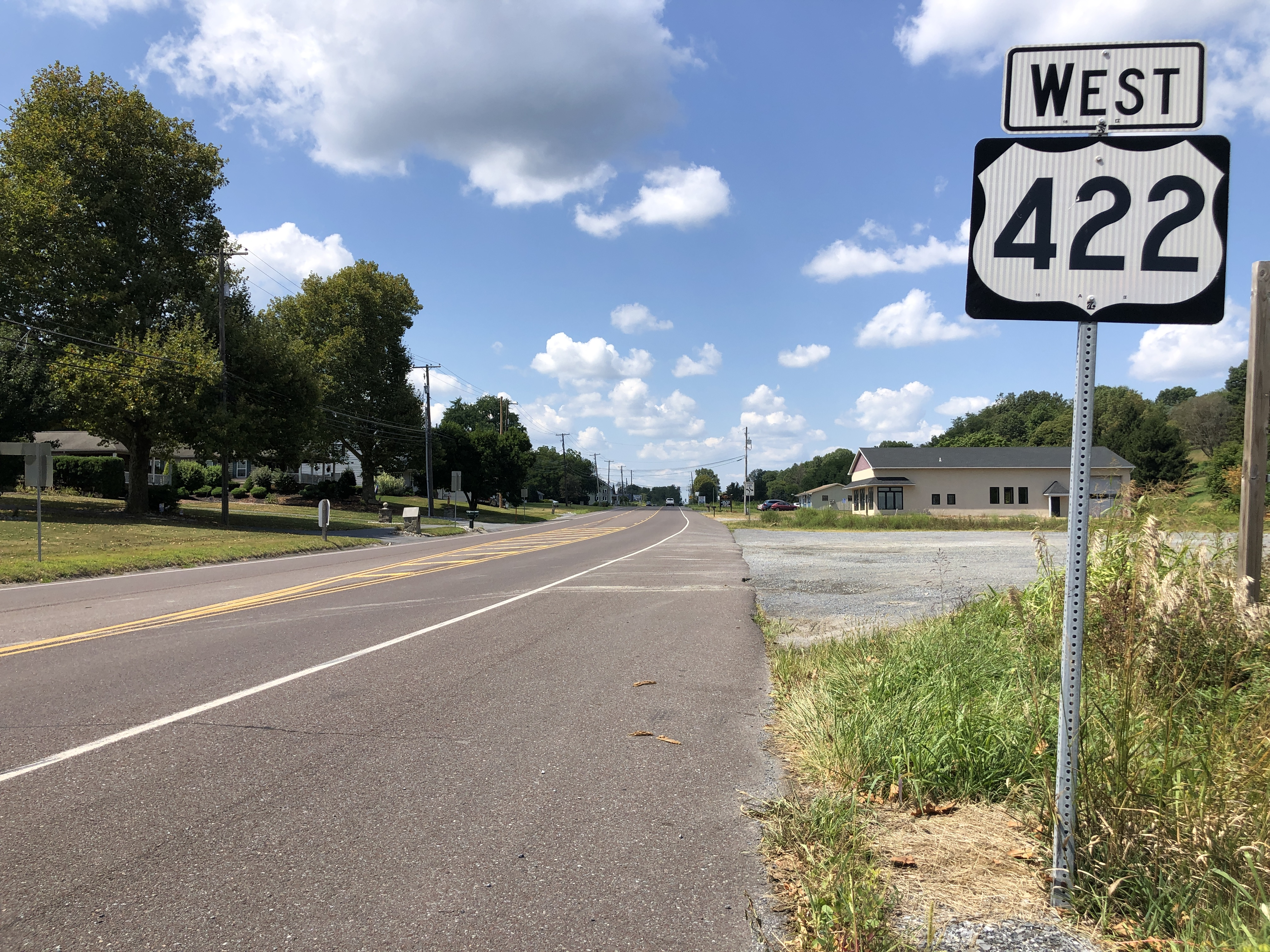
US 422 westbound in Heidelberg Township

As of 2017, there were 38.66 miles (62.22 km) of public roads in Heidelberg Township, of which 15.11 miles (24.32 km) were maintained by the Pennsylvania Department of Transportation (PennDOT) and 23.55 miles (37.90 km) were maintained by the township.

U.S. Route 422 and Pennsylvania Route 419 are the numbered highways serving Heidelberg Township. US 422 follows a northwest–southeast alignment along Penn Avenue through the central portion of the township, while PA 419 follows Newmanstown Road and Third Street along a north–south alignment in the western portion of the township.

== Gallery ==
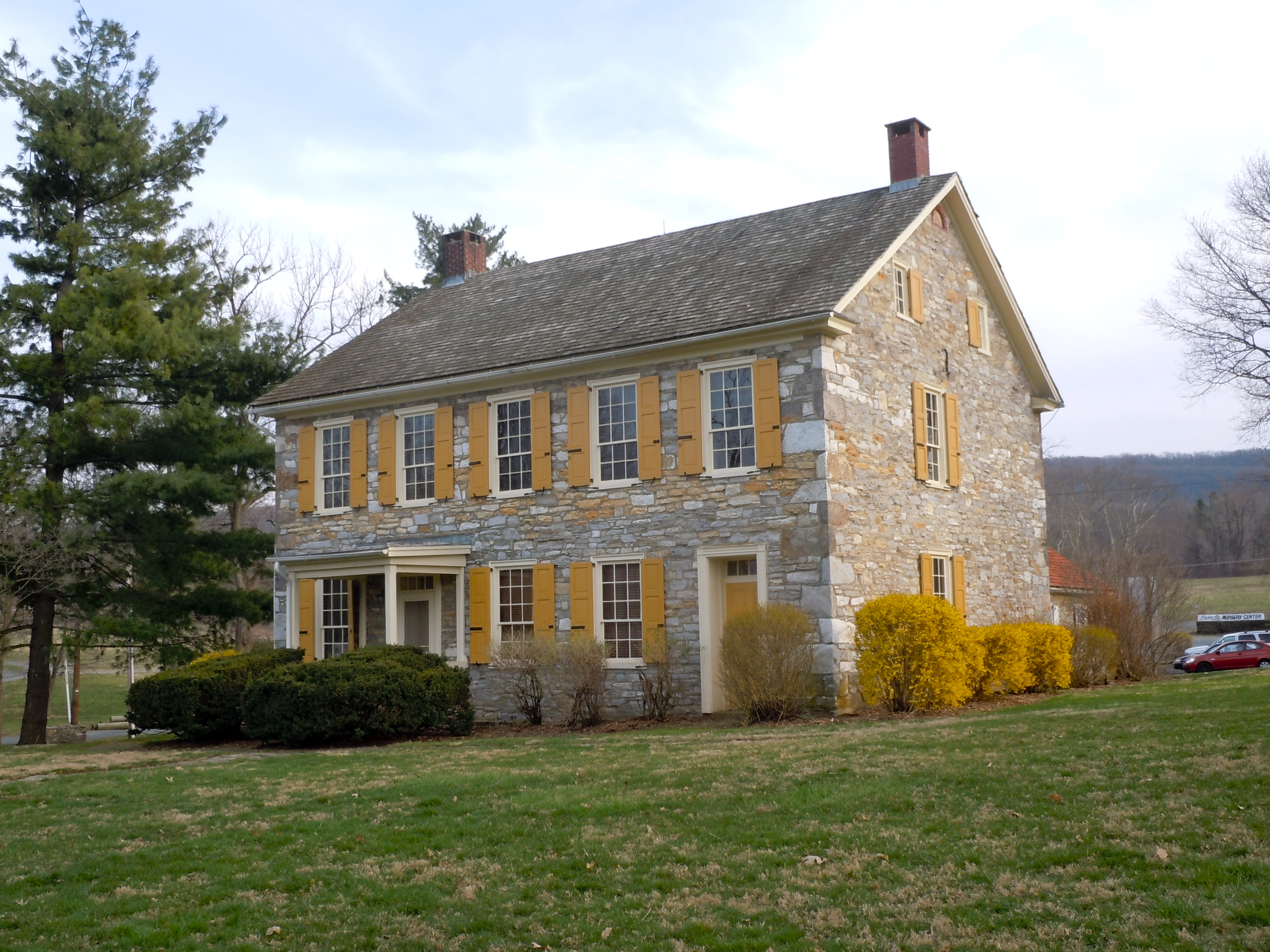
Historic Conrad Weiser Homestead near Womelsdorf.

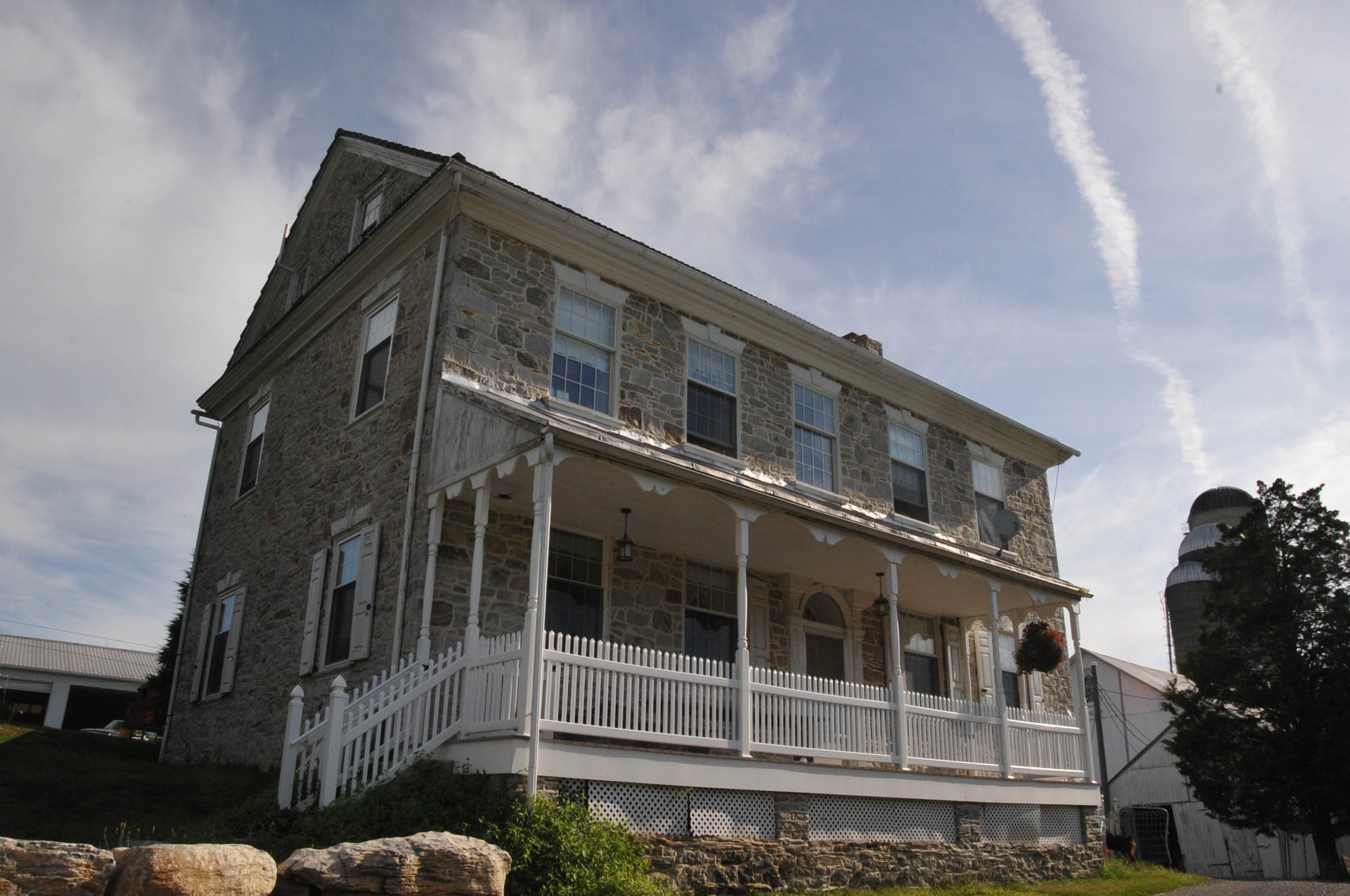
Historic Kissling Farm on Brownsville Rd.

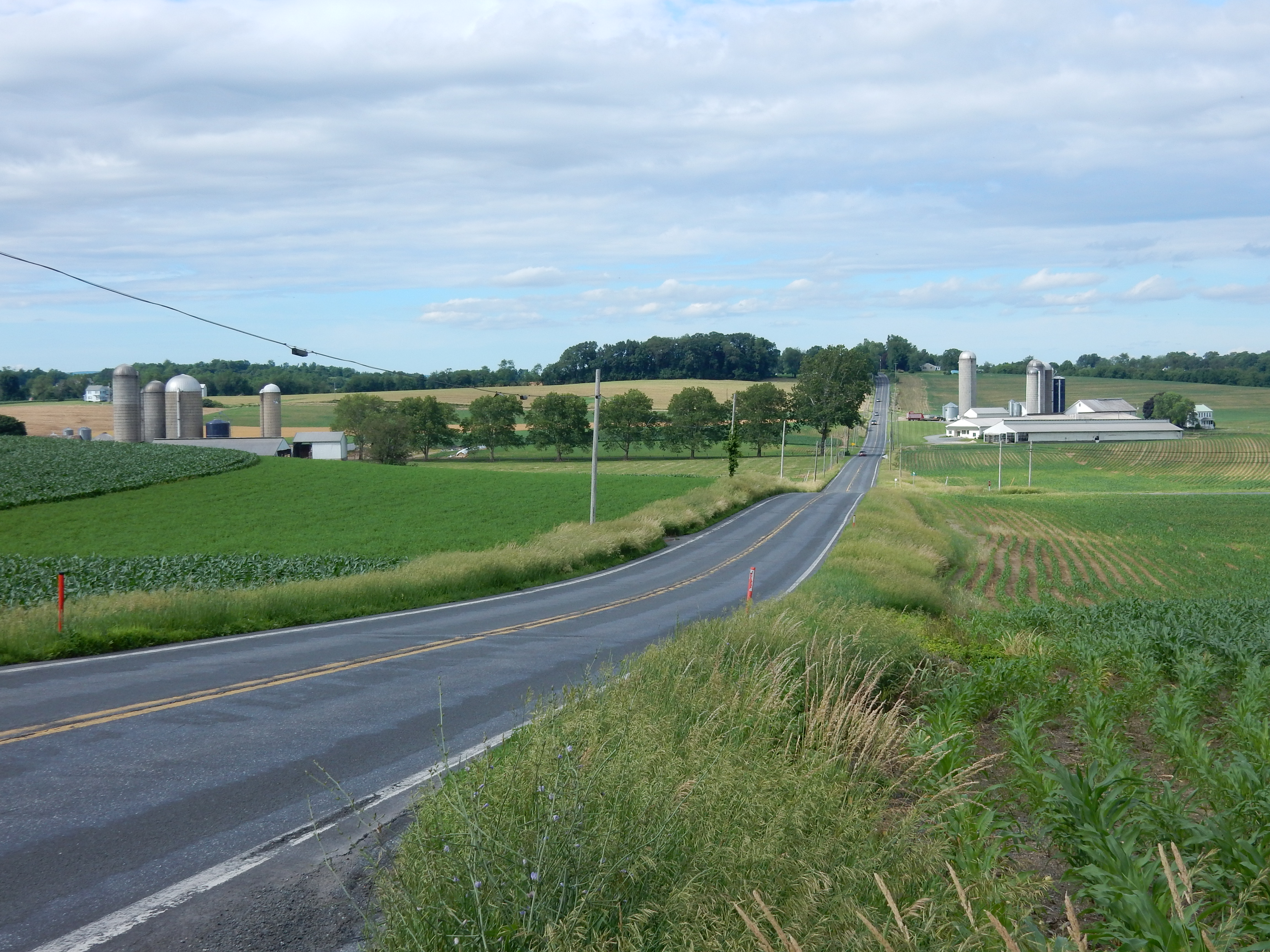
Bernville Rd. in Heidelberg Twp.

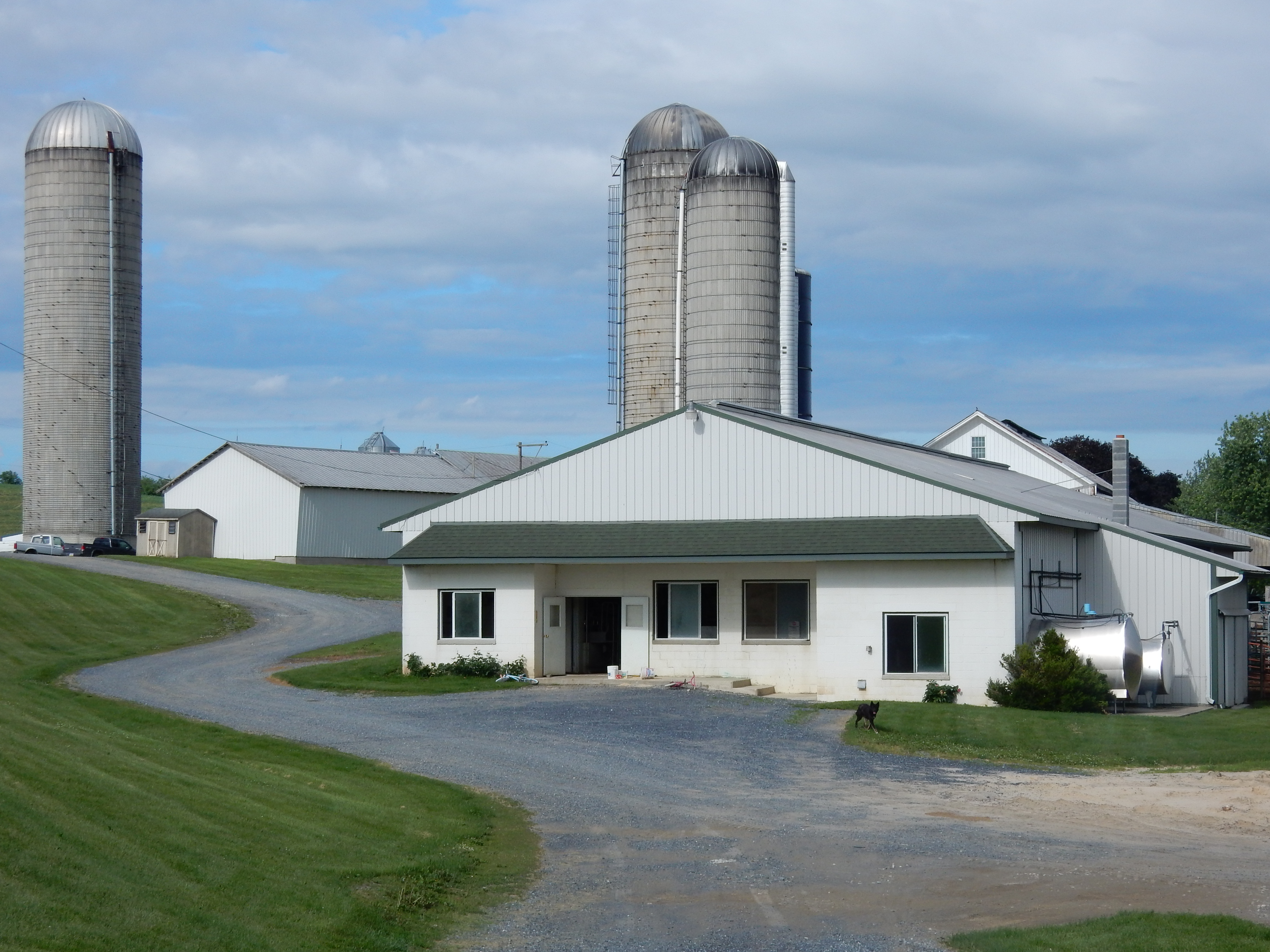
Farm on Bernville Rd.
