= Charles S. Foos Elementary School =

- U.S. National Register of Historic Places
- U.S. Historic district – Contributing property
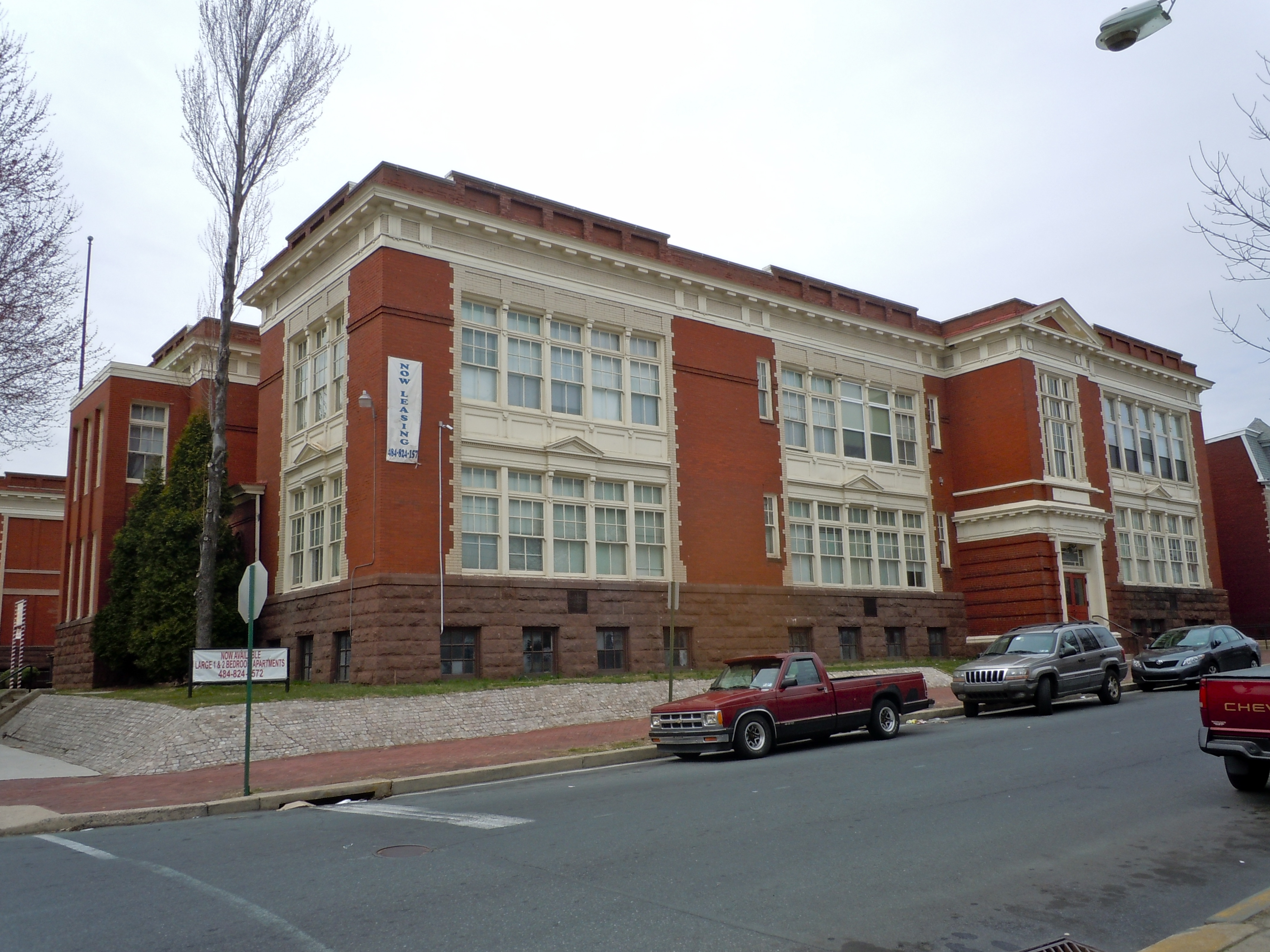
- Charles S. Foos Elementary School, March 2011

- Location within Pennsylvania Location within the United States
- Location: Douglass and Weiser Sts., Reading, Pennsylvania
- Coordinates: 40°20′52″N 75°56′18″W
- Area: 0.2 acres (0.081 ha)
- Built: 1903, 1912, 1921
- Architect: Scholl, Edward
- Architectural style: Classical Revival
- NRHP reference No.: 83004191
- Added to NRHP: November 10, 1983

Charles S. Foos Elementary School, also known as Douglass and Weiser School, is a historic elementary school building located at Reading, Berks County, Pennsylvania. It was built in 1903 and was expanded and renovated in 1912. A small addition was built in 1921. It was originally in the Romanesque Revival style, but transformed to the Classical Revival style with the renovations. The C-shaped brick building contains 21 classrooms and an auditorium that seats over 200. The school closed in 1979. Part of the very large school building is now a nursery school, and part condominiums.

It was listed on the National Register of Historic Places in 1983. It is located in the Queen Anne Historic District.
