= Meinig Glove Factory-E. Richard Meinig Co. =

- Meinig Glove Factory-Meinig, E. Richard, Co.
- U.S. National Register of Historic Places
- U.S. Historic district
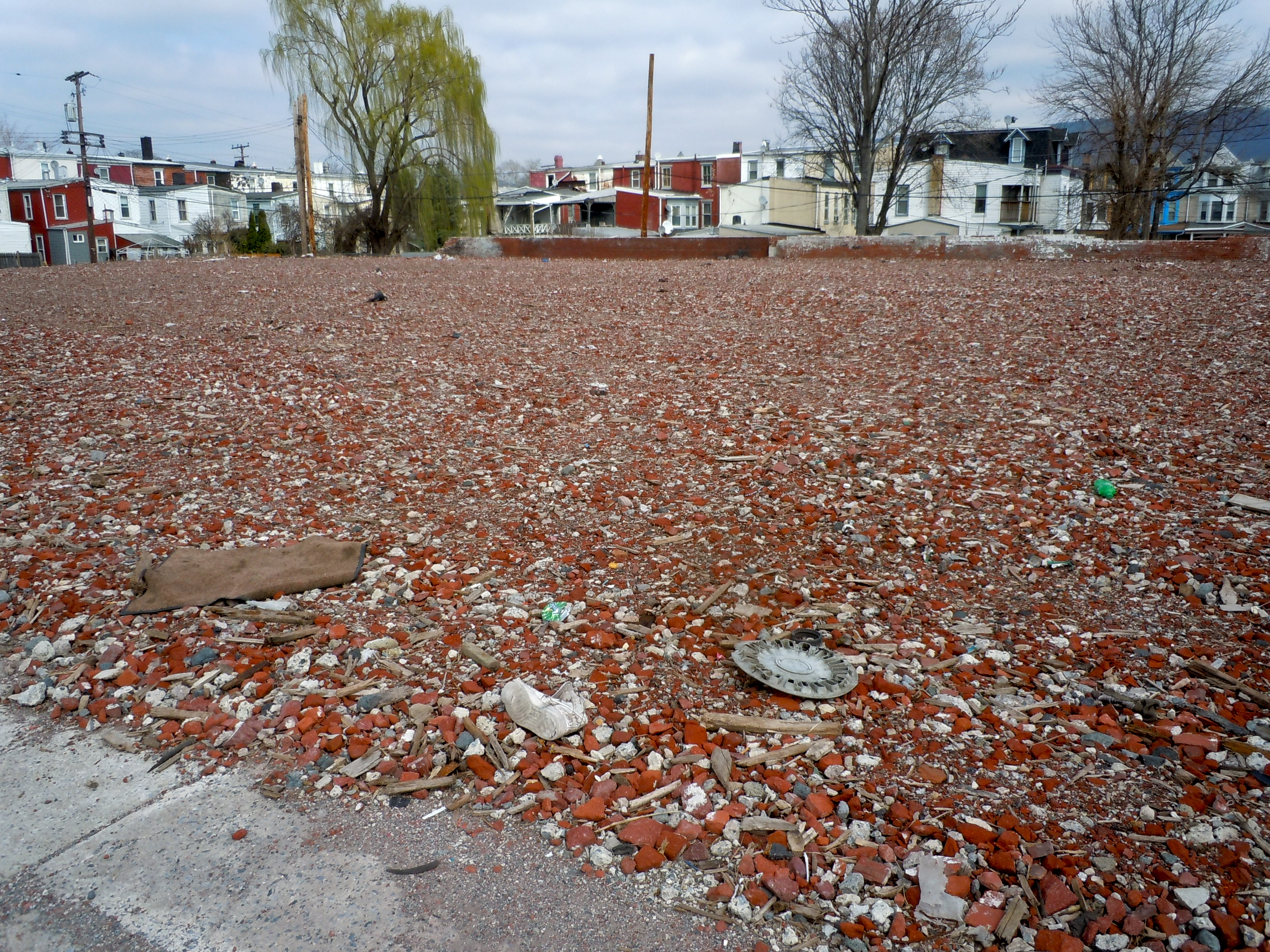
- Meinig Glove Factory site, April 2011

- Location within Pennsylvania Location within the United States
- Location: 621-641 McKnight St., Reading, Pennsylvania
- Coordinates: 40°20′44″N 75°56′13″W
- Area: 1.3 acres (0.53 ha)
- Built: c. 1905
- Built by: Raudenbusch Co.
- NRHP reference No.: 85001896
- Added to NRHP: August 30, 1985

The Meinig Glove Factory-E. Richard Meinig, Co., also known as Ellmar Mills, was an historic factory complex and national historic district located in Reading, Berks County, Pennsylvania, United States.

Located in the Queen Anne Historic District, it was listed on the National Register of Historic Places in 1985.

== History and architectural features ==
This district included two properties with six buildings, four of which were contributing. All buildings were constructed of brick. Buildings A and B were built by 1906. Building A was a four-story, L-shaped building, with a seven-story section. Building B was a two-story, rectangular building, measuring 130 feet by twenty-five feet. Building C was a one-story building measuring, 190 feet by fifty-five feet, and Building D was a four-story, building measuring forty-five feet by 118 feet, which had a basement. The buildings were demolished by 2011.
