= Queen Anne Historic District =

Historic district in Pennsylvania, United States

- U.S. National Register of Historic Places
- U.S. Historic district
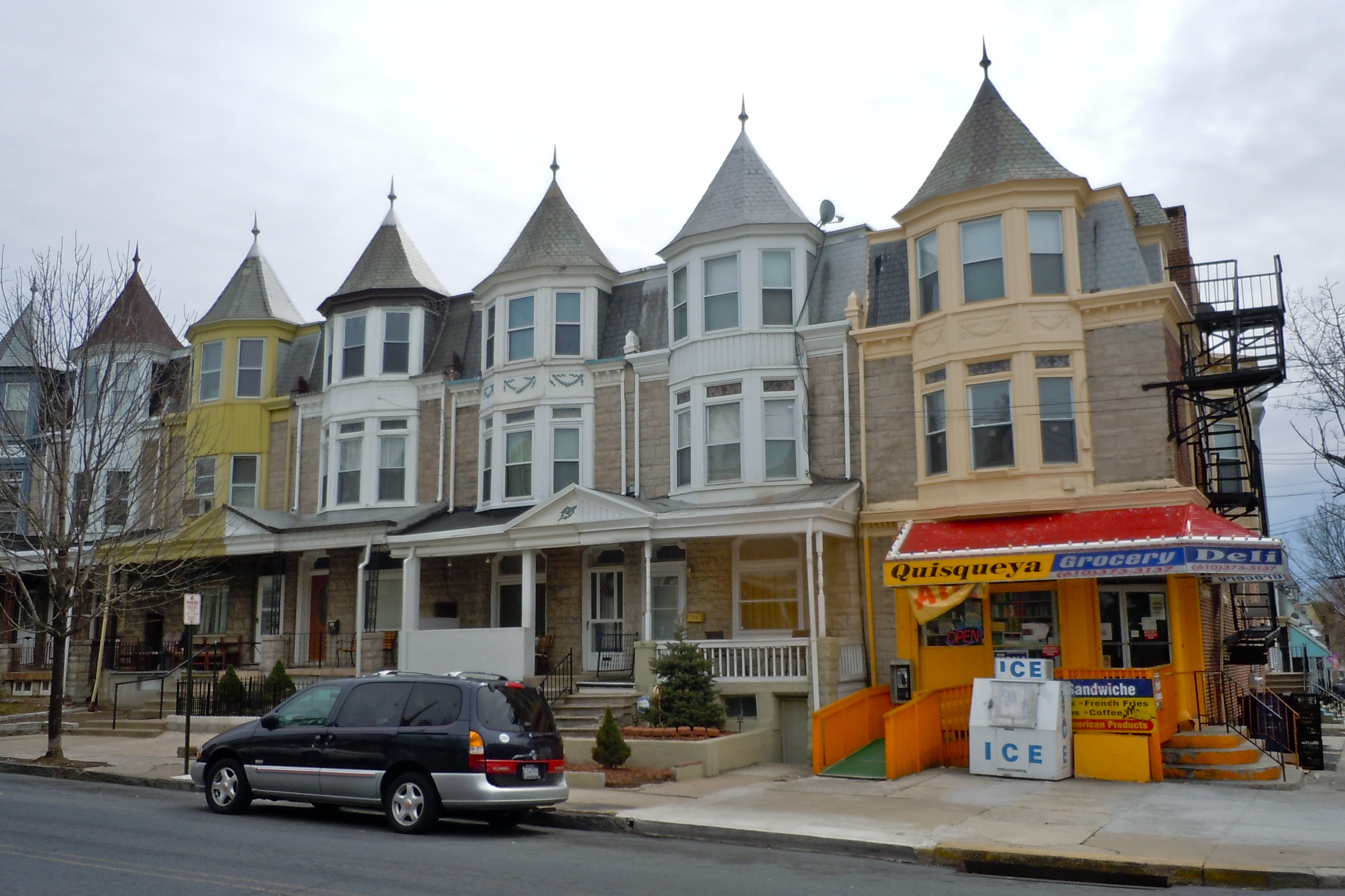
- McKnight and Windsor, Queen Anne Historic District, March 2011

- Location within Pennsylvania Location within the United States
- Location: Roughly bounded by Robeson St., North Third St., RR Tracks and Clinton St., Reading, Pennsylvania
- Coordinates: 40°20′55″N 75°56′13″W
- Area: 160 acres (65 ha)
- Built: 1900
- Architectural style: Queen Anne, Gothic Revival
- NRHP reference No.: 04001227
- Added to NRHP: November 12, 2004

Queen Anne Historic District is a national historic district located in Reading, Berks County, Pennsylvania. The district encompasses 2,405 contributing buildings in Reading built between about 1880 and 1925. The district consists primarily of semi-detached houses and rowhouses, with a few stone church buildings and small commercial buildings. Most of the buildings are constructed of brick and reflective of Late Victorian and early 20th-century architectural styles. The churches are St. Mary's Episcopal Church (1904) and Wesley United Methodist Church (1922). Located in the district and separately listed are the Charles S. Foos Elementary School and former Meinig Glove Factory-E. Richard Meinig Co.

It was listed on the National Register of Historic Places in 2004.
