= Reading Hardware Company Butt Works =

- U.S. National Register of Historic Places
- U.S. Historic district – Contributing property
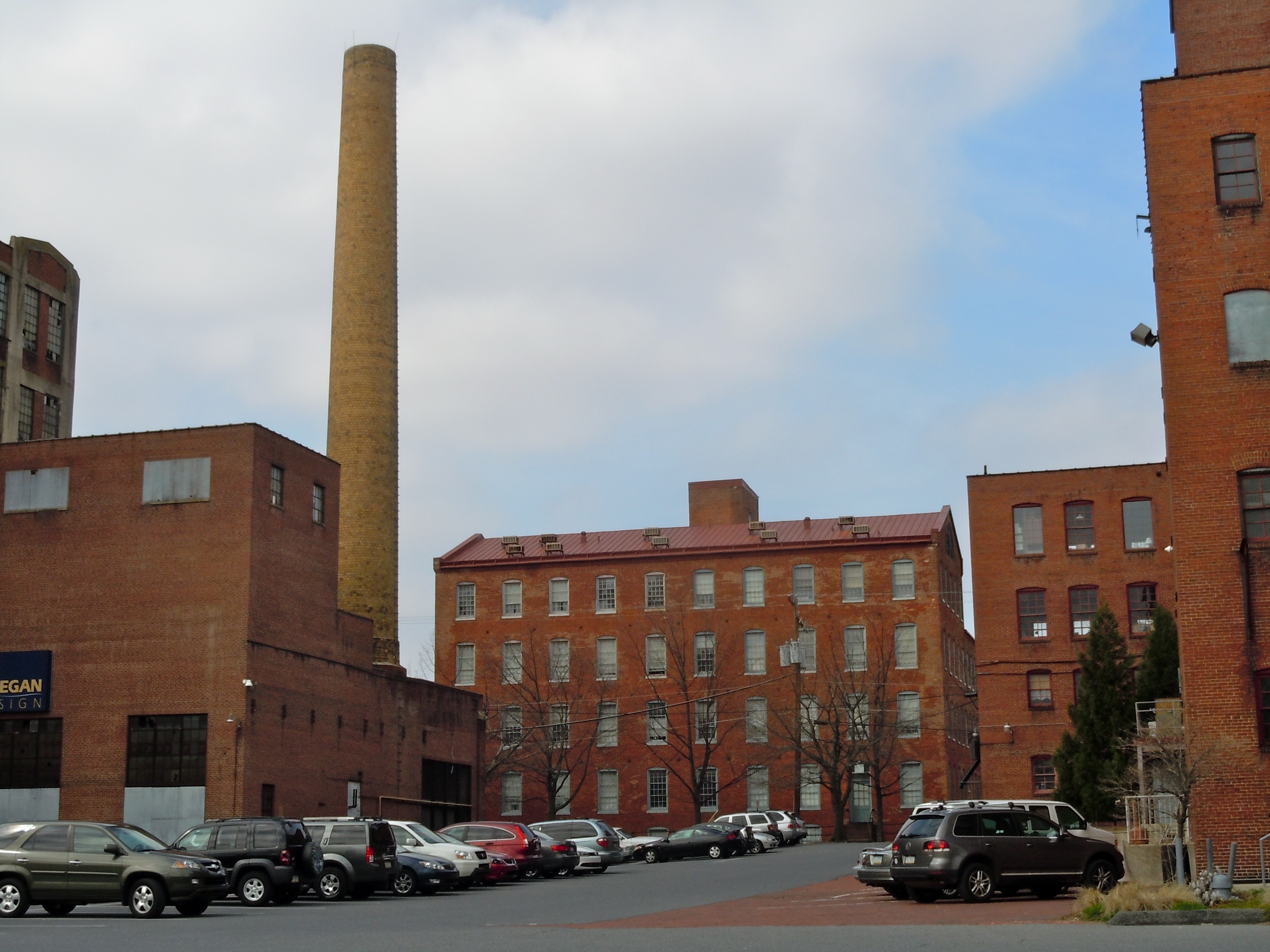
- Reading Hardware Butt Works, April 2011

- Location within Pennsylvania Location within the United States
- Location: 537 Willow St., Reading, Pennsylvania
- Coordinates: 40°19′29″N 75°55′33″W
- Area: 7.7 acres (3.1 ha)
- Built: 1875
- NRHP reference No.: 79002170
- Added to NRHP: November 20, 1979

The Reading Hardware Company Butt Works, also known as "The Hardware," is an historic factory building in Reading, Berks County, Pennsylvania, United States.

It was listed on the National Register of Historic Places in 1979. It is included in the Reading Hardware Company national historic district.

== History and architectural features ==
Built in 1875, this historic structure consists of two wings that are connected by a boiler house. They were configured to enclose a courtyard that was then enclosed by a brick wall. The wings are three- and four-stories, and constructed of brick bearing walls with heavy timber framing. The boiler house has two square, free-standing chimneys and topped by a central lantern monitor.
