= Reading Hardware Company =

- U.S. National Register of Historic Places
- U.S. Historic district
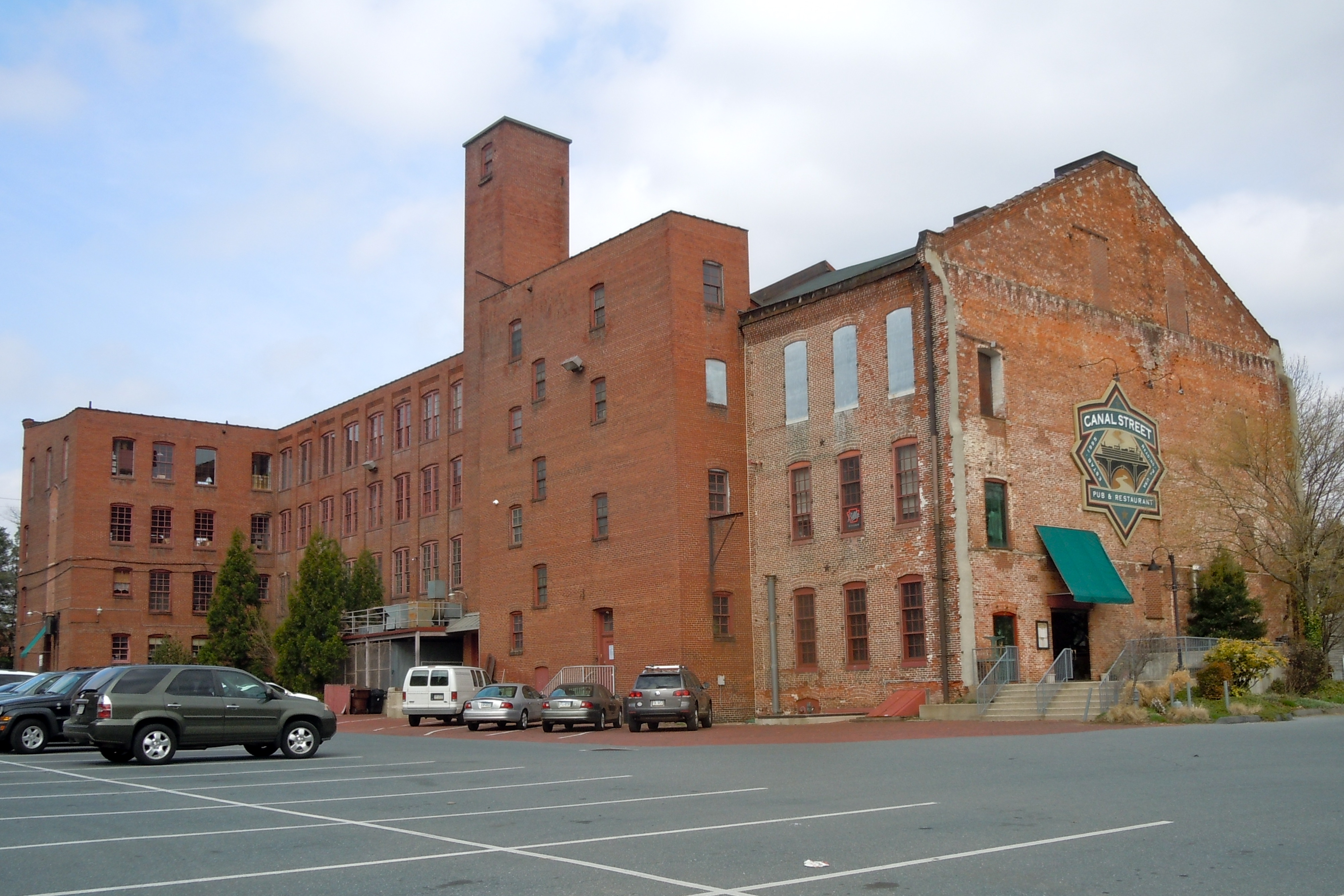
- Reading Hardware District, April 2011

- Location within Pennsylvania Location within the United States
- Location: Roughly bounded by Willow, S. 6th, and Canal Sts., and alleyway, Reading, Pennsylvania
- Coordinates: 40°19′32″N 75°55′38″W
- Area: 2.6 acres (1.1 ha)
- Built: 1888
- Architect: The Ballinger Company
- Architectural style: Late 19th And Early 20th Century American Movements, Modern Movement
- NRHP reference No.: 97000516
- Added to NRHP: June 13, 1997

The Reading Hardware Company, also known as "The Hardware," is an historic factory complex and national historic district in Reading, Berks County, Pennsylvania, United States.

It was listed on the National Register of Historic Places in 1997.

== History and architectural features ==
This district includes five contributing buildings, along with the previously listed Reading Hardware Company Butt Works. They include brick and heavy timber frame and reinforced concrete buildings that date to the late-nineteenth and early-twentieth centuries.
