= Berne, Pennsylvania =

Unincorporated community in Pennsylvania, US

- Unincorporated community
- Location within Pennsylvania Location within the United States
- Coordinates: 40°31′26″N 76°00′06″W
- Country: United States
- State: Pennsylvania
- County: Berks
- Township: Tilden
- Time zone: UTC-5 (Eastern (EST))
  - Summer (DST): UTC-4 (EDT)
- ZIP code: 19526
- Area codes: 610 & 484
- GNIS feature ID: 1192125

Berne is an unincorporated community in northern Berks County, Pennsylvania, United States. The community is approximately three miles outside Hamburg and is served by the Hamburg Area School District. Berne sits near the Schuylkill River, south of Blue Mountain, in southeastern Tilden Township.

== History ==
A post office called Berne was established in 1878, and remained in operation until 1954. The community was named after Bern, in Switzerland.
