= Jalappa, Pennsylvania =

Village in Pennsylvania, U.S.

- Village
- Interactive map of Jalappa, Pennsylvania
- Coordinates: 40°31′43.33″N 76°2′14.77″W
- Country: United States
- State: Pennsylvania
- County: Berks
- Elevation: 430 ft (130 m)

Population
  - Total: 1,597
- Time zone: CST
  - Summer (DST): CDT
- ZIP code: 19526
- GNIS feature ID: 1177973

Jalappa is a village in Tilden Township, Berks County, Pennsylvania, United States. It is located on Old Route 22 (also known as the Hex Highway), less than one mile south of Interstate 78. Access to 78 is from Hamburg and Shartlesville. The Mill Creek flows eastward through the village to the Schuylkill River. The village uses the Hamburg ZIP code of 19526.
