= Hamburg Area School District =

School district in Pennsylvania

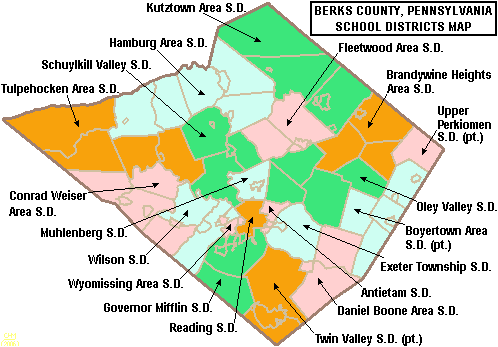

Address
- 701 Windsor Street Hamburg, Berks County, Pennsylvania, 19526-0401; United States

District information
- Type: Public
- Grades: KG–12
- Schools: 4
- Budget: $43,442,000 (2019–20)
- NCES District ID: 4211340

Students and staff
- Students: 2,065 (2021–22)
- Teachers: 152.00 (FTE)
- Student–teacher ratio: 13.59
- District mascot: Hawks
- Colors: Red and white

Other information
- Website: www.hasdhawks.org

The Hamburg Area School District is a small, rural/suburban public school district serving parts of Berks County, Pennsylvania. It encompasses the communities of Shoemakersville, Perry Twp, Windsor Twp, Hamburg, Tilden Twp, Upper Bern Twp, Strausstown, and Upper Tulpehocken Township.

The district is one of the 500 public school districts of Pennsylvania. The District encompasses approximately 103 square miles (270 km^{2}). It is the largest, geographically, of Berks County's eighteen public school districts.

According to 2000 federal census data, the Hamburg Area School District served a resident population of 18,103. By 2010, the District's population increased to 21,088 people.

== History and demographics ==
In 2009, Hamburg Area School District residents’ per capita income was $20,105, while the median family income was $53,440. In the Commonwealth, the median family income was $49,501 and the United States median family income was $49,445, in 2010.

By 2013, the median household income in the United States had increased to $52,100.

== Schools ==
- Hamburg Area HS (9–12)
- Hamburg Area Middle School (6–8)
- Perry El Sch (KG–5)
- Tilden El Center (KG–5)

== Extracurriculars ==
The Hamburg Area School District offers a wide variety of clubs, activities and an extensive sports program.

=== Sports ===
The District funds:

Boys

- Baseball - AAA
- Basketball- AAA
- Bowling - AAAA
- Cross Country - AA
- Football - AA
- Golf - AA
- Indoor Track and Field - AAAA
- Soccer - AA
- Swimming and Diving - AA
- Tennis - AA
- Track and Field - AAA
- Wrestling - AA

Girls

- Basketball - AAA
- Bowling - AAAA
- Cross Country - AA
- Indoor Track and Field - AAAA
- Field Hockey - AA
- Golf - AA
- Soccer (Fall) - AA
- Softball - AAA
- Swimming and Diving - AA
- Girls' Tennis - AA
- Track and Field - AA

Middle School Sports

Boys

- Baseball
- Basketball
- Cross Country
- Football
- Soccer
- Track and Field
- Wrestling

Girls

- Basketball
- Cross Country
- Field Hockey
- Softball
- Soccer (fall)
- Track and Field

According to PIAA directory July 2013
