= Blue Mountain Academy =

Coordinates: 40.5537°N 76.0369°W

Location
- 2363 Mountain Road; Hamburg, Pennsylvania, 19526; United States

Information
- Type: Private
- Motto: Providing a Christ-centered Seventh-day Adventist education that leads students into lives of service for God
- Principal: Burney Culpepper
- Enrollment: 120
- Campus: Country
- Colors: Blue and Gold
- Nickname: BMA
- Affiliations: Seventh-day Adventist Church
- Website: www.bma.us

Blue Mountain Academy (BMA) is a Seventh-day Adventist Christian boarding high school located in Tilden Township, Pennsylvania. It is located at the foot of the Blue Mountain Range. It is a part of the Seventh-day Adventist education system, the world's second largest Christian school system.

== Academics ==
The required curriculum includes classes in the following subject areas: Religion, English, Oral Communications, Social Studies, Mathematics, Science, Physical Education, Health, Computer Applications, Fine Arts, and Electives. The school, under the leadership of Aaron Webber, has a vocational program, in which freshmen and other new students work in several locations and areas of campus.

== See also ==
- List of Seventh-day Adventist secondary schools
- Seventh-day Adventist education
