= Hamburg Historic District =

Hamburg Historic District may refer to:

- Hamburg Historic District (Davenport, Iowa)
- Hamburg Historic District (Hamburg, Pennsylvania)
