= DSCP =

DSCP may refer to:

- Differentiated services code point, a field in the IPv4 and IPv6 headers in computer networking
- Defense Supply Center Philadelphia, a latter name of the Philadelphia Quartermaster Depot
