= Newville Historic District =

Historic district in Pennsylvania, United States

- U.S. National Register of Historic Places
- U.S. Historic district
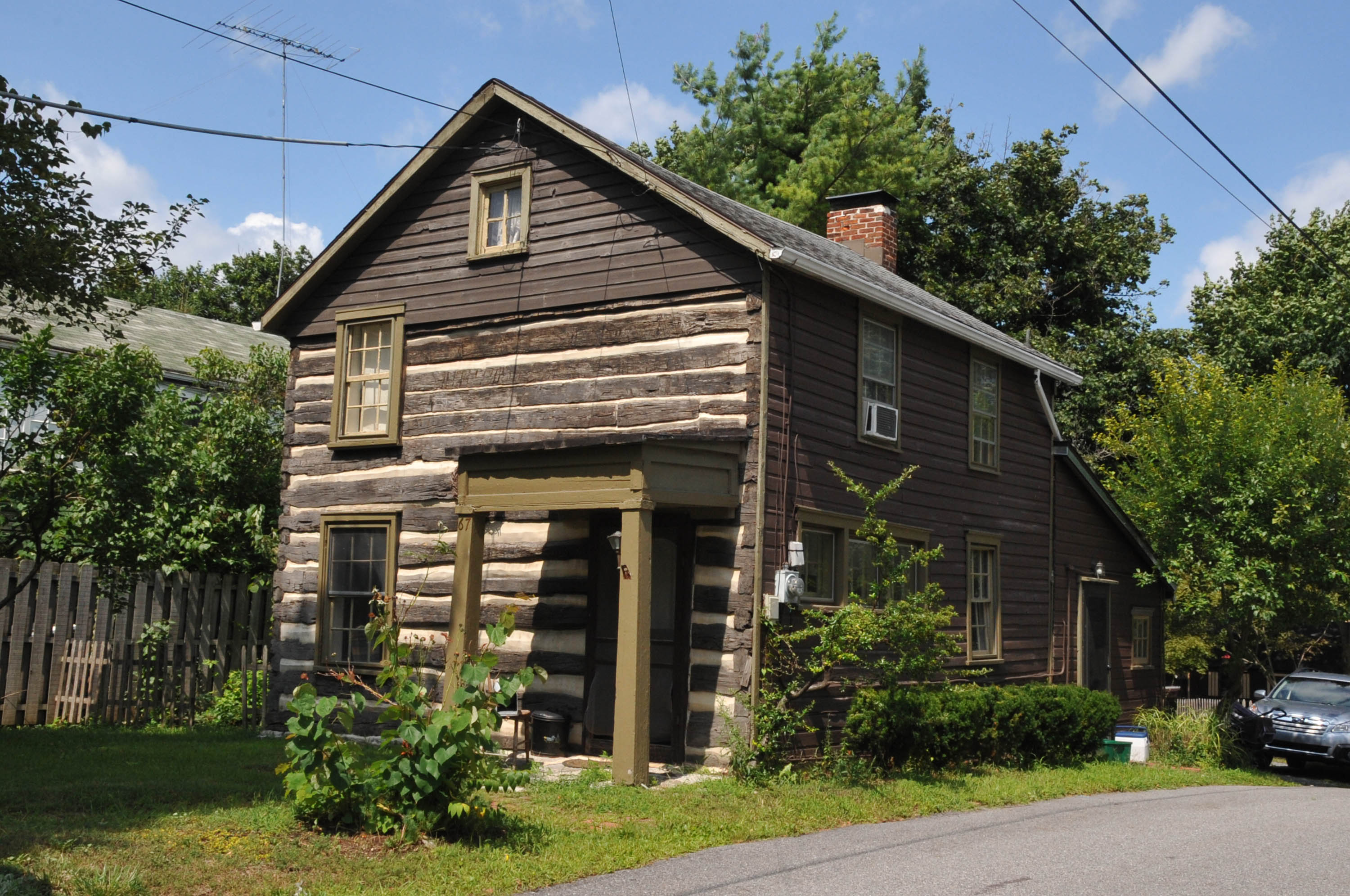
- 1795 log cabin

- Location within Pennsylvania Location within the United States
- Location: Roughly bounded by Cove Alley, Big Spring Creek, the Cumberland Valley Railroad right-of-way, Washington St., Newville, Pennsylvania
- Coordinates: 40°10′23″N 77°23′55″W
- Area: 86.6 acres (35.0 ha)
- Architectural style: Italianate, Gothic Revival, Greek Revival, Queen Anne, Second Empire, Colonial Revival, Federal, Georgian, Late Victorian
- NRHP reference No.: 10000397
- Added to NRHP: June 28, 2010

The Newville Historic District is a national historic district which is located in Newville, Cumberland County, Pennsylvania. The district is bordered roughly by Cove Alley, Big Spring Creek, the right-of-way for the Cumberland Valley Railroad, and Washington Street, and encompasses 414 contributing buildings, one contributing site, and two contributing objects in the central business district and surrounding residential areas of Newville.

== History ==
Most of the contributing buildings in this historic district are residential, spanning construction dates from 1790 to 1950. The oldest residential building is a log residence. Contributing non-residential buildings include the Big Spring Presbyterian Church (1790) and five additional churches, two governmental buildings, nine commercial buildings, three social buildings, one educational building, and one industrial building. The contributing objects are a fountain (1899) and a Veterans of Foreign Wars memorial monument (1940). The contributing site is Big Spring Presbyterian Cemetery (c. 1777).

=== Placement of this district on the National Register of Historic Places ===
The community's application to place the Newville Historic District on the National Register of Historic Places was reviewed by the Historic Preservation Board of the Pennsylvania Historical and Museum Commission at its meeting on October 6, 2009, along with applications for: the Hamburg Historic District in Hamburg, Pennsylvania, the Hamnett Historic District in Wilkinsburg, Pennsylvania, the Pennsylvania State Office Building and the Philadelphia Quartermaster Depot in Philadelphia, the Experimental and Safety Research Coal Mines in Allegheny County's South Park Township, and the Cheney Farm, Hopewell Farm, and Chandler Mill Road Bridge in Chester County.

This district was then officially added to the National Register of Historic Places in 2010.
