= Hahn Fire Apparatus =

Defunct American motor vehicle manufacturer

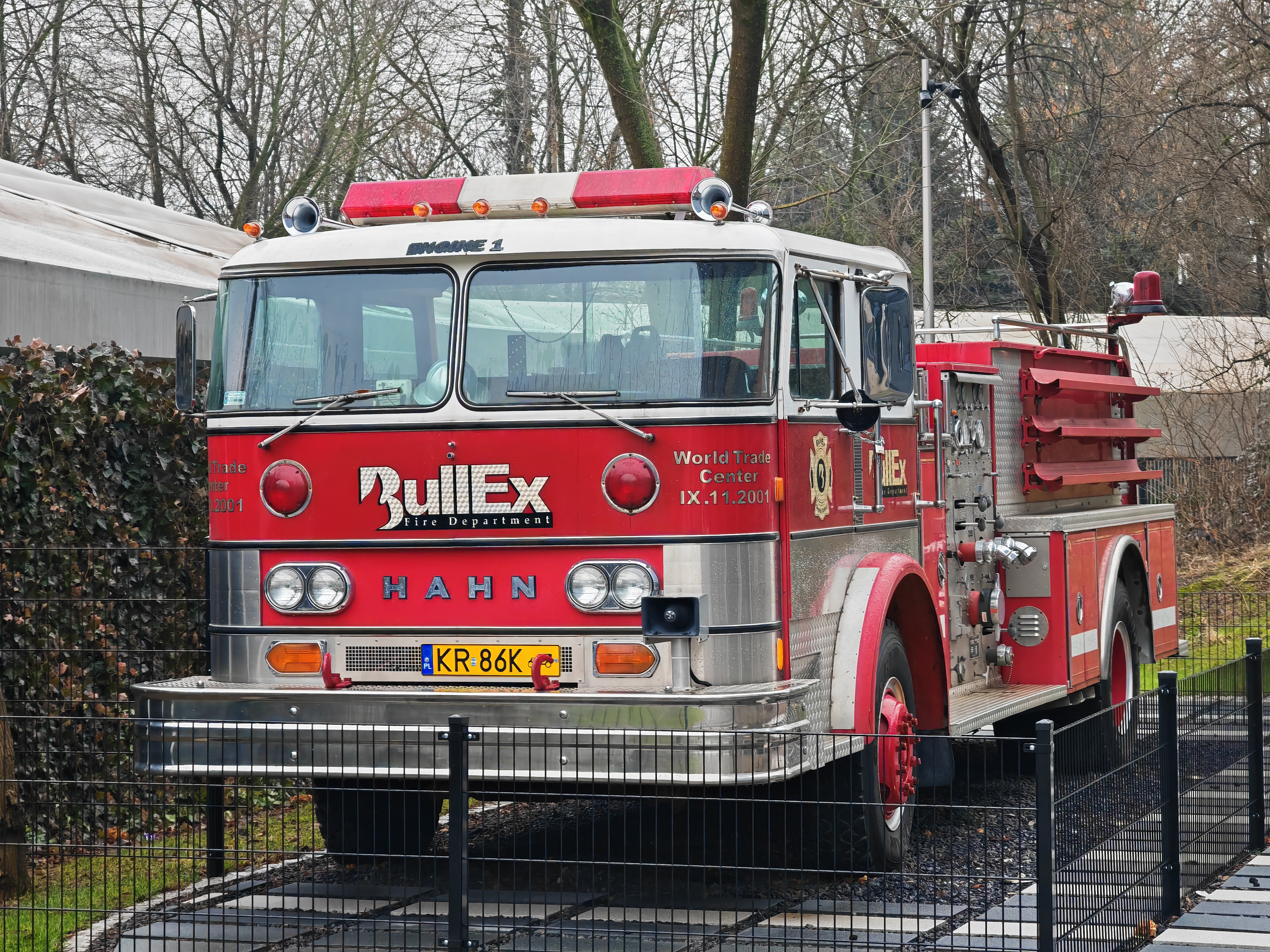
Hahn HCP-10 located in Poland

Hahn Fire Apparatus, also known as Hahn Motors, was a fire engines and apparatus and truck builder formerly located in Hamburg, within Berks County, Pennsylvania.

It was in operation from 1916 until its closure in 1989.

== Products ==
The company manufactured custom and commercial fire engines and firefighting apparatus.

Hahn manufactured its own chassis for its fire engines. They were also for commercial trucks it built, such as delivery vehicles and construction vehicles.

The company also built buses.

== See also ==
- Fire service vehicles
