= Hamburg Historic District (Hamburg, Pennsylvania) =

Historic district in Pennsylvania, United States

- U.S. National Register of Historic Places
- U.S. Historic district
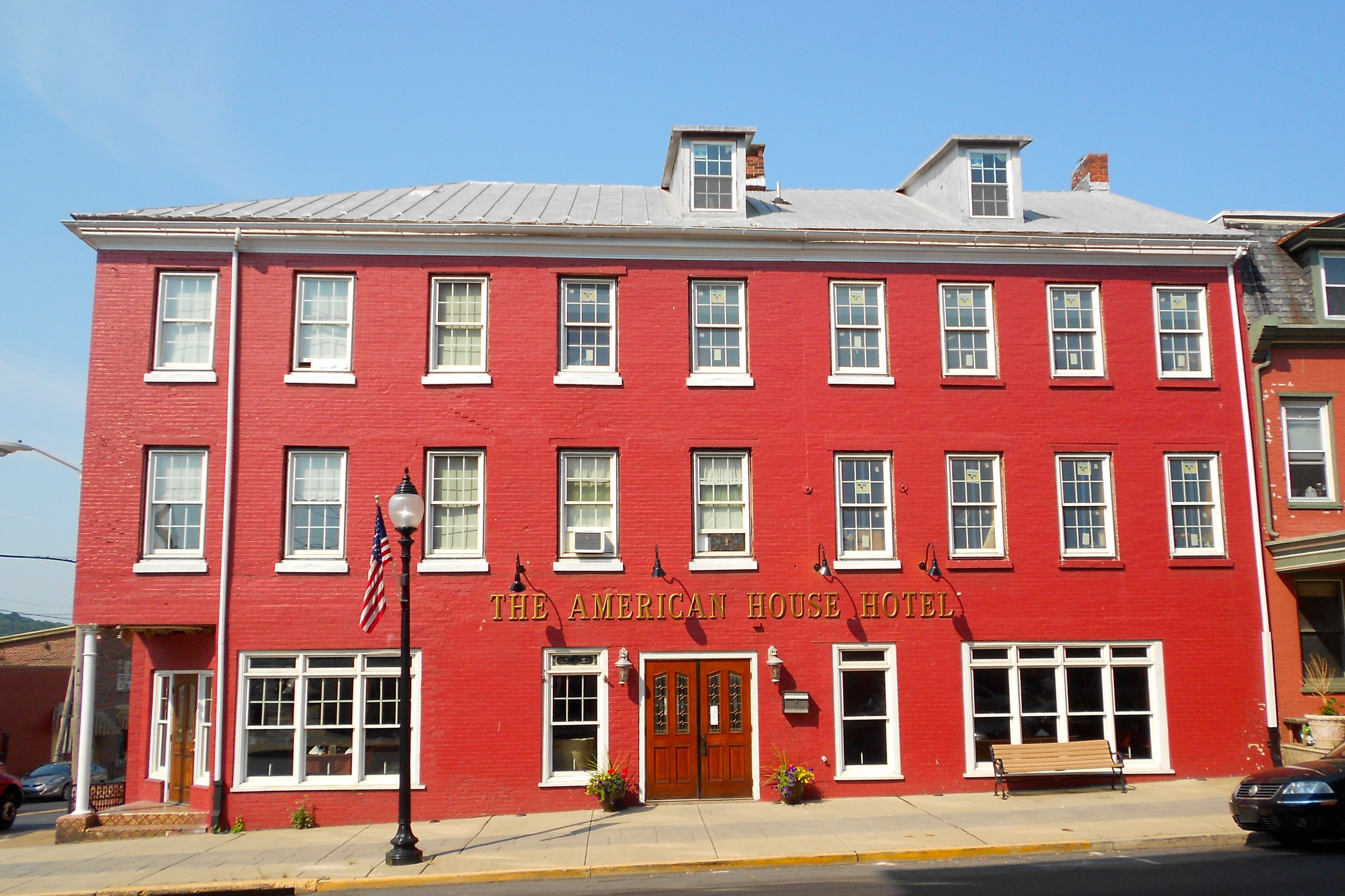
- The American House hotel

- Location within Pennsylvania Location within the United States
- Location: Roughly bounded by Franklin, Windsor, Walnut and Second Sts., Quince, Primrose, Peach and Plum Alleys and Mill Creek, Hamburg, Pennsylvania
- Coordinates: 40°33′20″N 75°58′55″W
- Area: 100.3 acres (40.6 ha)
- Architect: Multiple
- Architectural style: Italianate, Queen Anne, Gothic Revival, Late Victorian, Second Empire, Georgian, Federal, Greek Revival, Classical Revival, Commercial Style, Colonial Revival, Art Deco
- NRHP reference No.: 10000398
- Added to NRHP: June 28, 2010

The Hamburg Historic District is a national historic district located in Hamburg, Berks County, Pennsylvania. The district encompasses 435 contributing buildings in the borough of Hamburg, and is bordered, roughly, by Franklin, Windsor, Walnut, and Second Streets; Quince, Primrose, Peach, and Plum Alleys; and Mill Creek.

It was listed on the National Register of Historic Places in 2010.

== History ==
According to architectural historian B. Raid, who assisted in preparing the nominating form to secure the placement of the Hamburg Historic District on the National Register of Historic Places, the Hamburg Historic District "encompasses an area of just over 100 acres in the center of the borough [of Hamburg, Pennsylvania], extending roughly from Franklin Street and Quince Alley in the north to Walnut and Windsor Streets in the south, and from Second Street and Peach Alley in the west to Mill Creek and Primrose Alley in the east."

The community's application to place the Hamburg Historic District on the National Register of Historic Places was reviewed by the Historic Preservation Board of the Pennsylvania Historical and Museum Commission at its meeting on October 6, 2009, along with applications for the: Hamnett Historic District in Wilkinsburg, Pennsylvania, the Newville Historic District in Newville, Pennsylvania, the Pennsylvania State Office Building and the Philadelphia Quartermaster Depot in Philadelphia, the Experimental and Safety Research Coal Mines in Allegheny County's South Park Township, and the Cheney Farm, Hopewell Farm, and Chandler Mill Road Bridge in Chester County.

Hamburg's historic district was subsequently officially listed on the National Register of Historic Places in 2010.

== Notable architecture ==
The Hamburg Historic District encompasses residential, institutional, industrial, and commercial buildings in a variety of popular 19th- and early-20th-century architectural styles including Queen Anne, Gothic Revival, Italianate, and Georgian. Notable non-residential buildings include the American House Hotel, Confer Building, Union Station (1886), Hamburg Elementary and High School (1889), U.S. Post Office (1939), Bethany United Methodist Church (1914), Patriotic Order of the Sons of America (c. 1799), Hamburg Industries (1880s), and Hamburg Knitting Mill (c. 1880-1911). The Hamburg Public Library is located within this district.
