= Hopewell Farm =

- U.S. National Register of Historic Places
- U.S. Historic district
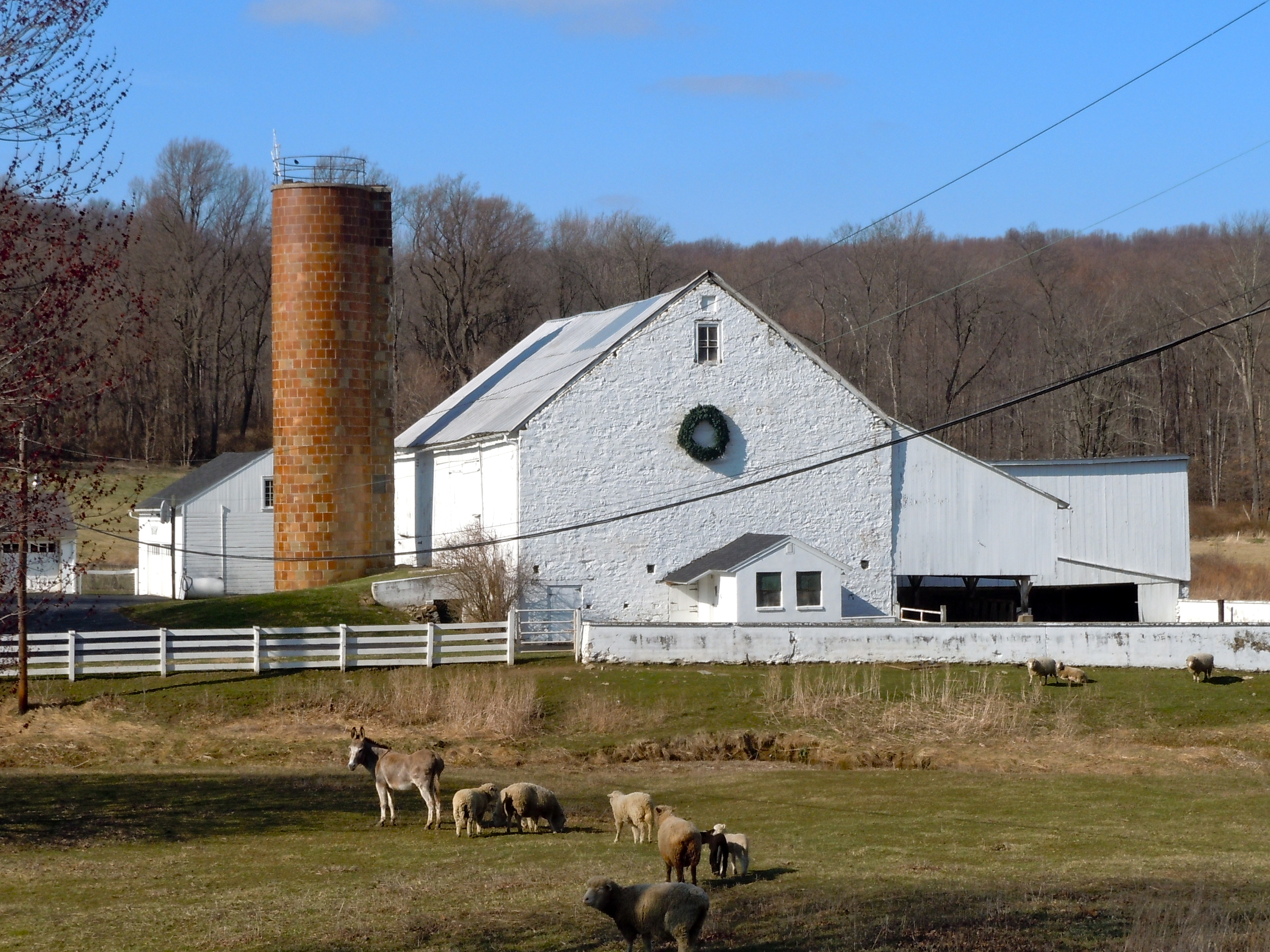
- Barn and Silo Complex at Hopewell Farm, March 2011

- Location within Pennsylvania Location within the United States
- Location: 1751 Valley Rd., Valley Township, Pennsylvania
- Coordinates: 39°58′01″N 75°52′09″W
- Area: 50 acres (20 ha)
- Built: 1787
- Architectural style: PA barn type
- NRHP reference No.: 09001215
- Added to NRHP: January 11, 2010

The Hopewell Farm, also known as Lower Farm and Hopedell Farm, is a historic home and farm located at 1751 Valley Road in Valley Township, Chester County, Pennsylvania. The 500-acre farm complex has six contributing buildings, one contributing site, and six contributing structures. The buildings and property were added to the National Register of Historic Places in 2010.

== History ==
The community's application to place the Hopewell Farm on the National Register of Historic Places was reviewed by the Historic Preservation Board of the Pennsylvania Historical and Museum Commission at its meeting on October 6, 2009, along with applications for: the Hamburg Historic District in Hamburg, Pennsylvania, Hamnett Historic District in Wilkinsburg, Pennsylvania, the Newville Historic District in Newville, Pennsylvania, the Pennsylvania State Office Building and the Philadelphia Quartermaster Depot in Philadelphia, the Experimental and Safety Research Coal Mines in Allegheny County's South Park Township, and the Cheney Farm and Chandler Mill Road Bridge in Chester County.

The buildings and property were then officially added to the National Register of Historic Places later in 2010.

== Architectural features ==
The contributing structures include: a 2 1/2-story stone and frame farmhouse (c. 1787 - 2000), tenant house (1940), stone and frame Pennsylvania bank barn and silo complex (c. 1825-c. 1930), chicken coop (1940), corn crib (c. 1930), two garages (c. 1930, c. 1940), milk / spring house (c. 1880), spring house (c. 1955), stone arch bridge (c. 1900), two privies (c. 1760, 1940), and the remains of a lime kiln (c. 1830).
