= West Hamburg, Pennsylvania =

Unincorporated community in Pennsylvania, US

- Census-designated place
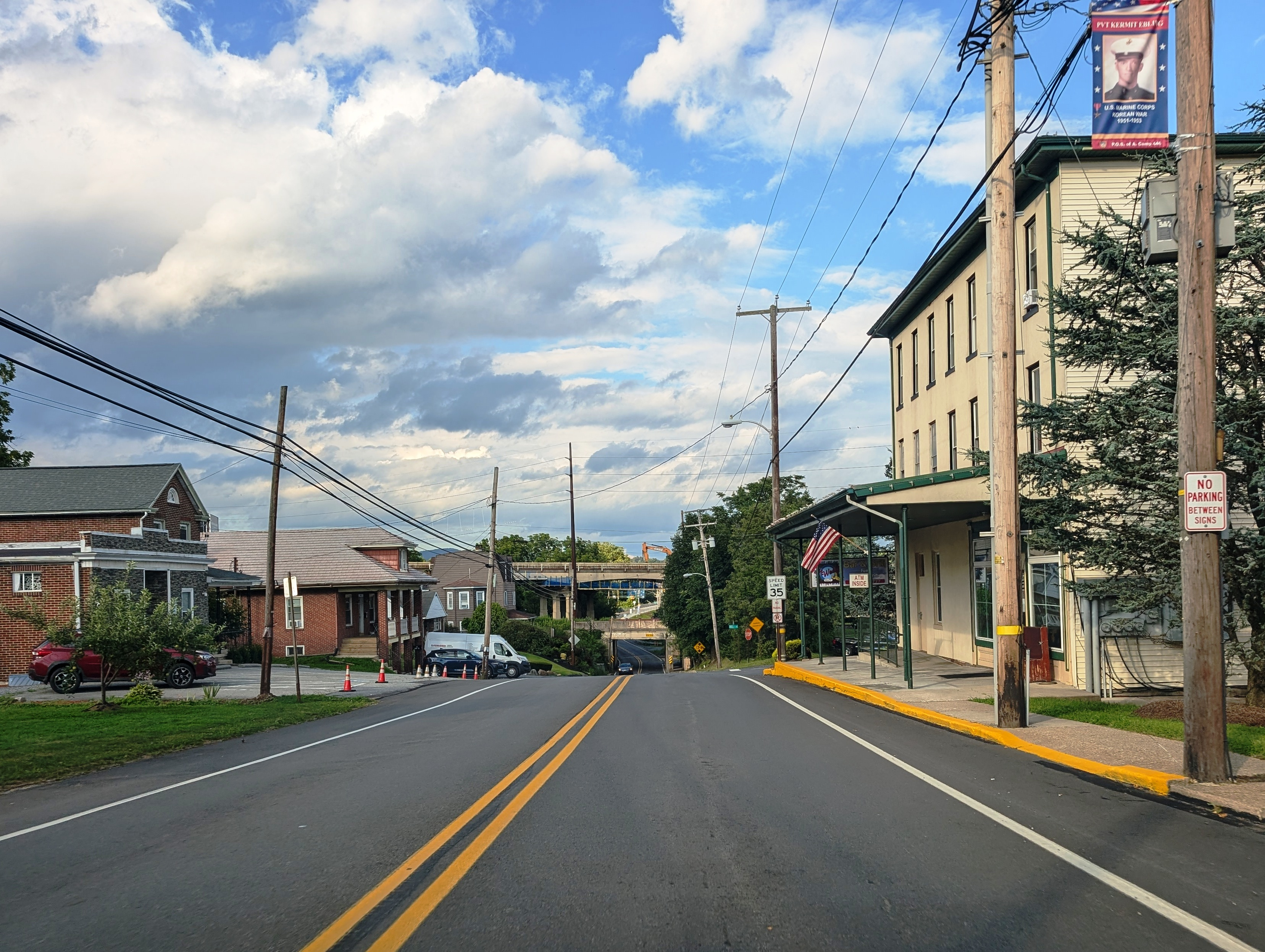
- Old Route 22 eastbound in West Hamburg

- Location within Pennsylvania Location within the United States
- Coordinates: 40°32′51″N 76°00′08″W
- Country: United States
- State: Pennsylvania
- County: Berks
- Township: Tilden

Population (2010)
  - Total: 1,979
- Time zone: UTC-5 (Eastern (EST))
  - Summer (DST): UTC-4 (EDT)
- ZIP Code: 19526
- Area codes: 484 and 610

West Hamburg is a census-designated place in Tilden Township, Berks County, Pennsylvania, United States. It is located along Old US Route 22 and just west of Pennsylvania Route 61 near the borough of Hamburg. The area is best known for having the biggest Cabela's store in the world. As of the 2010 census, the population was 1,979 residents.
