= Kauffman Mill =

- U.S. National Register of Historic Places
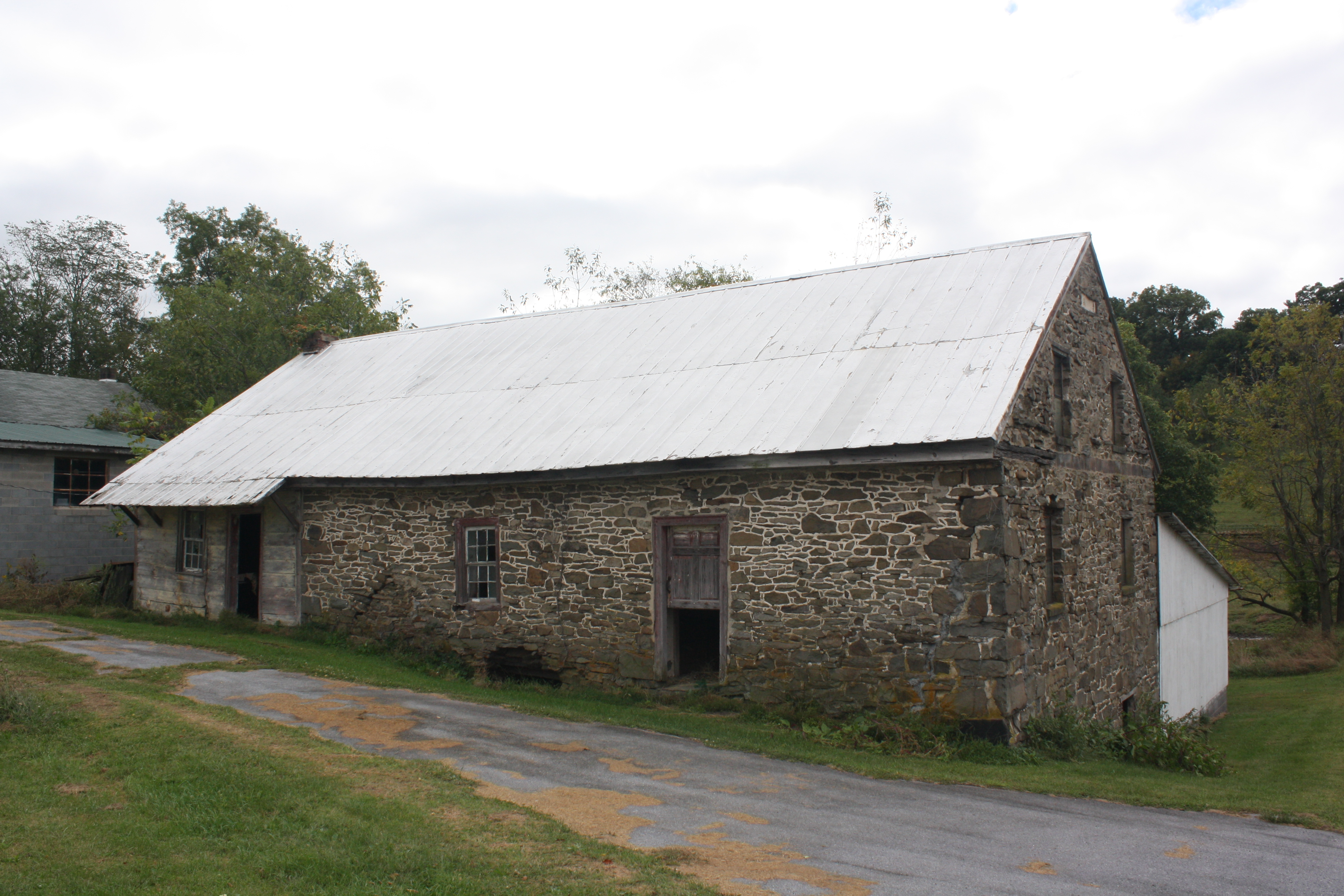
- Kauffman Mill. September 2013.

- Location within Pennsylvania Location within the United States
- Location: Jct. of Mill and Mill Hill Rds., Upper Bern Township, Pennsylvania
- Coordinates: 40°31′30″N 76°03′47″W
- Area: 1 acre (0.40 ha)
- Built: c. 1780
- MPS: Gristmills in Berks County MPS
- NRHP reference No.: 90001620
- Added to NRHP: November 8, 1990

The Kauffman Mill, also known as Spengler Mill, is an historic grist mill in Upper Bern Township, Berks County, Pennsylvania, United States.

It was listed on the National Register of Historic Places in 1990.

== History and architectural features ==
The combined mill and house structure was built about 1780, and is a one-and-one-half-story stone and half-timbered frame building with basement. It measures twenty-eight feet, six inches, by thirty-eight feet. The mill ceased operation circa 1939. The custom mill was built to serve local farms.

== Gallery ==
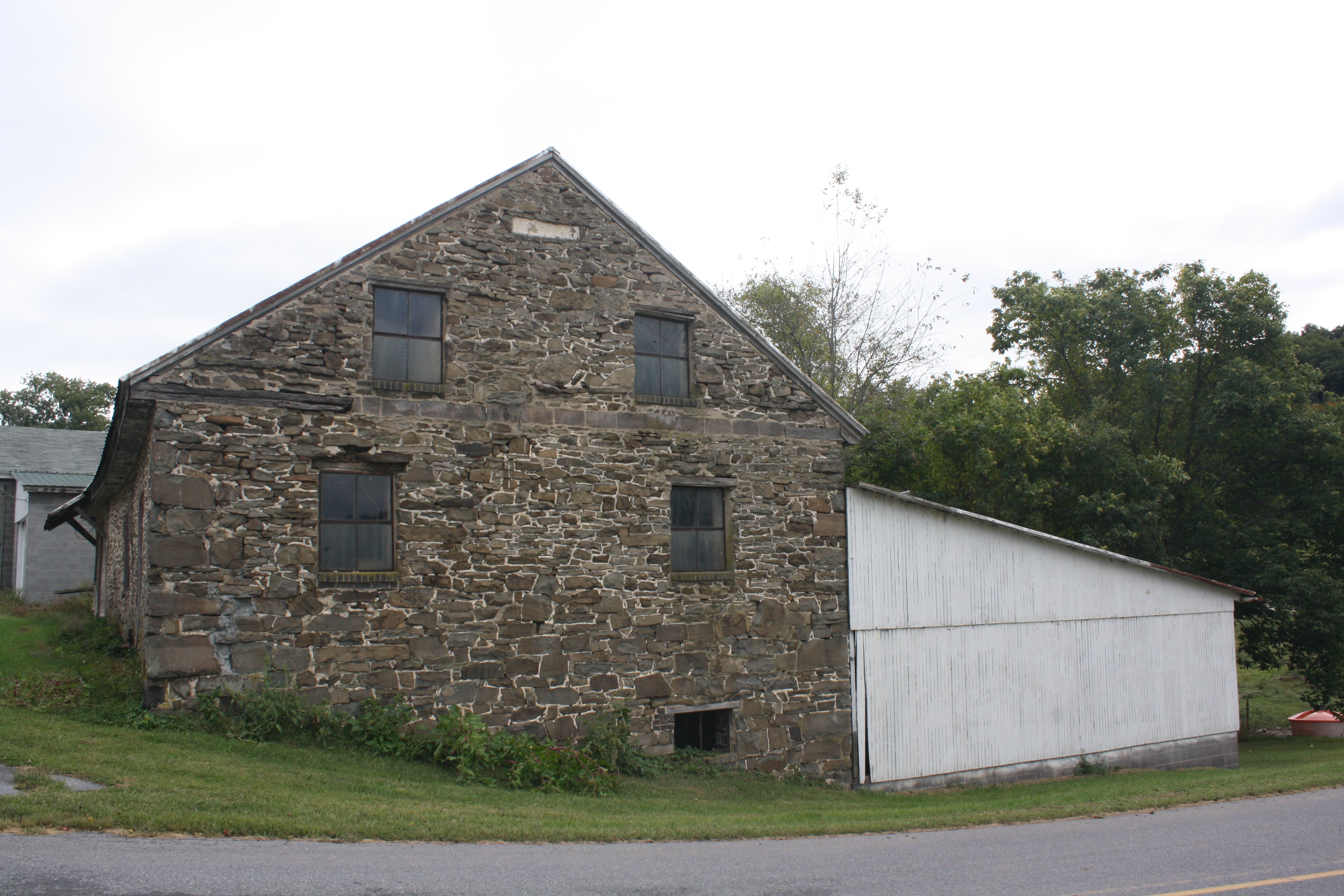
West side

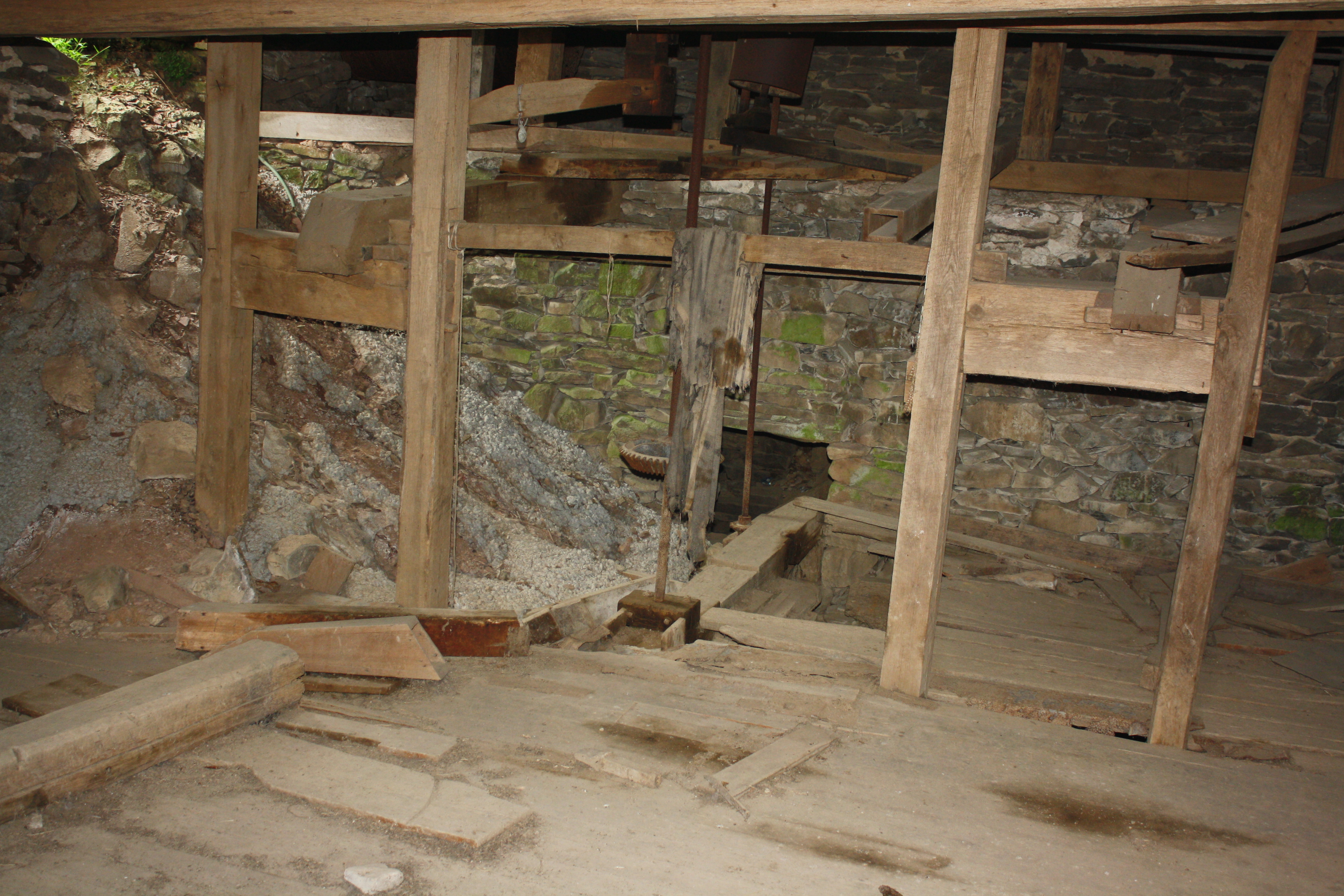
Interior

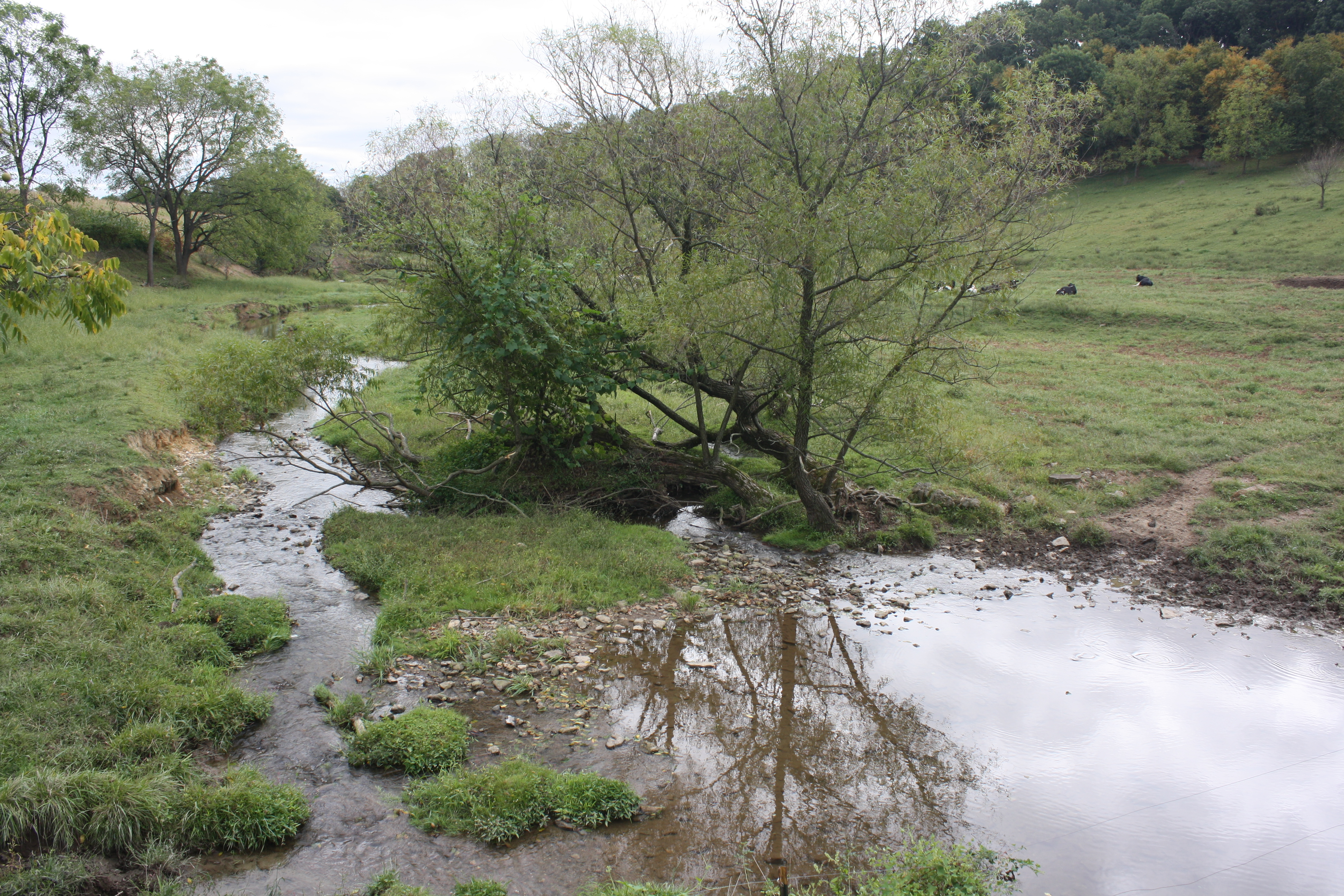
Mill creek
