= Hamnett Historic District =

Historic district in Pennsylvania, United States

- U.S. National Register of Historic Places
- U.S. Historic district
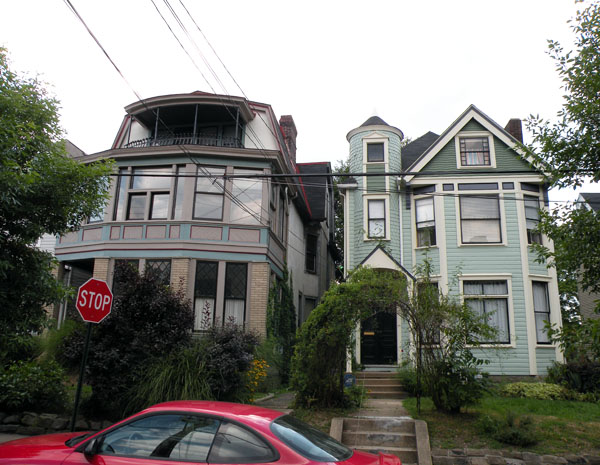

- Location within Pennsylvania Location within the United States
- Location: Roughly bounded by Rebecca Ave., rear property lines on the east side of Center St., Sewer Way, Lytle Way, and the Norfolk Southern RR right-of-way, Wilkinsburg, Pennsylvania
- Coordinates: 40°26′23″N 79°53′1″W
- Architect: Multiple
- Architectural style: Queen Anne, Colonial Revival
- NRHP reference No.: 10000408
- Added to NRHP: June 28, 2010

Hamnett Historic District is a historic district in Wilkinsburg, Pennsylvania. Bordered roughly by Rebecca Avenue, the rear property lines on the east side of Center Street, Sewer Way, and Lytle Way, it encompasses 77 buildings and 114 acres.

This district was listed on the National Register of Historic Places on June 28, 2010.

== History ==
Established in 2010, the 114-acre Hamnett Historic District is located in Wilkinsburg, Pennsylvania, and is bordered, roughly, by Rebecca Avenue and by the rear property lines on the east side of Center Street, Sewer Way, and Lytle Way. Among its 77 historic structures are residences which were designed in the Queen Anne and Colonial Revival styles of architecture.

Restoration on the historic structures in this district began in 2004 via initiatives launched by the Pittsburgh History and Landmarks Foundation and that foundation's for-profit development affiliate, Landmark Development Corporation. Within a decade, more than 70 structures were improved, a new neighborhood center was opened, and the community's supply of affordable housing was increased. The collaborators were subsequently honored with the Richard H. Driehaus Foundation National Preservation Award in recognition of their accomplishments.

In 2015, the two affiliates entered into a collaboration with Falconhurst Development to begin an $11.5 million multi-site restoration within and near the Hamnett Historic District. In addition to restoring four vacant buildings which had been built sometime around the beginning of the 20th century, the developer had plans to open a series of new townhouses in the same area by 2016 with the collaborators again indicating that the housing would be affordable, based on United States Housing and Urban Development Department (HUD) guidelines. Ground was broken on the project in late September 2015.

=== Placement of this district on the National Register of Historic Places ===
The community's application to place the Hamnett Historic District on the National Register of Historic Places was reviewed by the Historic Preservation Board of the Pennsylvania Historical and Museum Commission at its meeting on October 6, 2009, along with applications for the: Hamburg Historic District in Hamburg, Pennsylvania, the Newville Historic District in Newville, Pennsylvania, the Pennsylvania State Office Building and the Philadelphia Quartermaster Depot in Philadelphia, the Experimental and Safety Research Coal Mines in Allegheny County's South Park Township, and the Cheney Farm, Hopewell Farm, and Chandler Mill Road Bridge in Chester County.

The Hamnett Historic District was then officially listed on the National Register of Historic Places on June 28, 2010.
