= Pennsylvania State Office Building =

- U.S. National Register of Historic Places
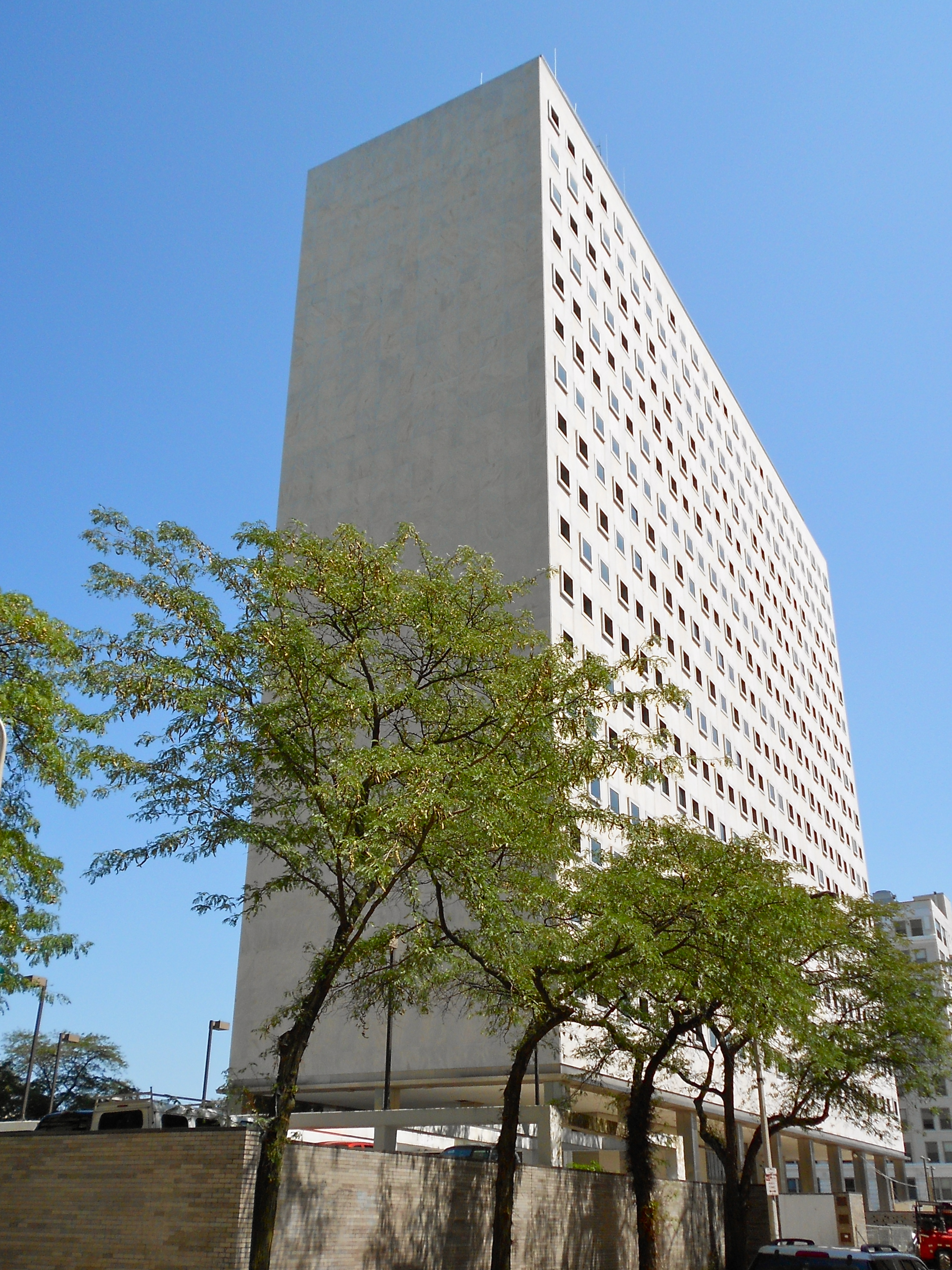
- From the southwest

- Location within Philadelphia Location within Pennsylvania Location within the United States
- Location: 1400 Spring Garden St, Philadelphia, Pennsylvania
- Coordinates: 39°57′43.2″N 75°9′44″W
- Area: 1.9 acres (0.77 ha)
- Built: 1957-1958
- Architect: Carroll, Grisdale & Van Alen; Harbeson, Hough, Livingston & Larson; Nolen & Swinburne; Ian McHarg
- Architectural style: Modern movement
- NRHP reference No.: 09001216
- Added to NRHP: January 7, 2010

The Pennsylvania State Office Building is a historic office building located in the Hahnemann neighborhood of Philadelphia, Pennsylvania. It was built between 1957 and 1958, and is an 18-story, steel frame and reinforced concrete building.

== History ==
Philadelphia's application to place the Pennsylvania State Office Building on the National Register of Historic Places was reviewed by the Historic Preservation Board of the Pennsylvania Historical and Museum Commission at its meeting on October 6, 2009, along with applications for: the Hamburg Historic District in Hamburg, Pennsylvania, the Hamnett Historic District in Wilkinsburg, Pennsylvania, the Newville Historic District in Newville, Pennsylvania, the Philadelphia Quartermaster Depot in Philadelphia, the Experimental and Safety Research Coal Mines in Allegheny County's South Park Township, and the Cheney Farm, Hopewell Farm, and Chandler Mill Road Bridge in Chester County.

The Pennsylvania State Office Building was listed on the National Register of Historic Places later in 2010.

== Architectural features ==
The historic Pennsylvania State Office Building is clad in white marble exterior panels and measures 63 feet by 259 feet. Its style is reflective of the Modern movement. The building is surrounded by a group of formal concrete plazas. At one end is a black granite fountain with a double concave shape.

== Gallery ==
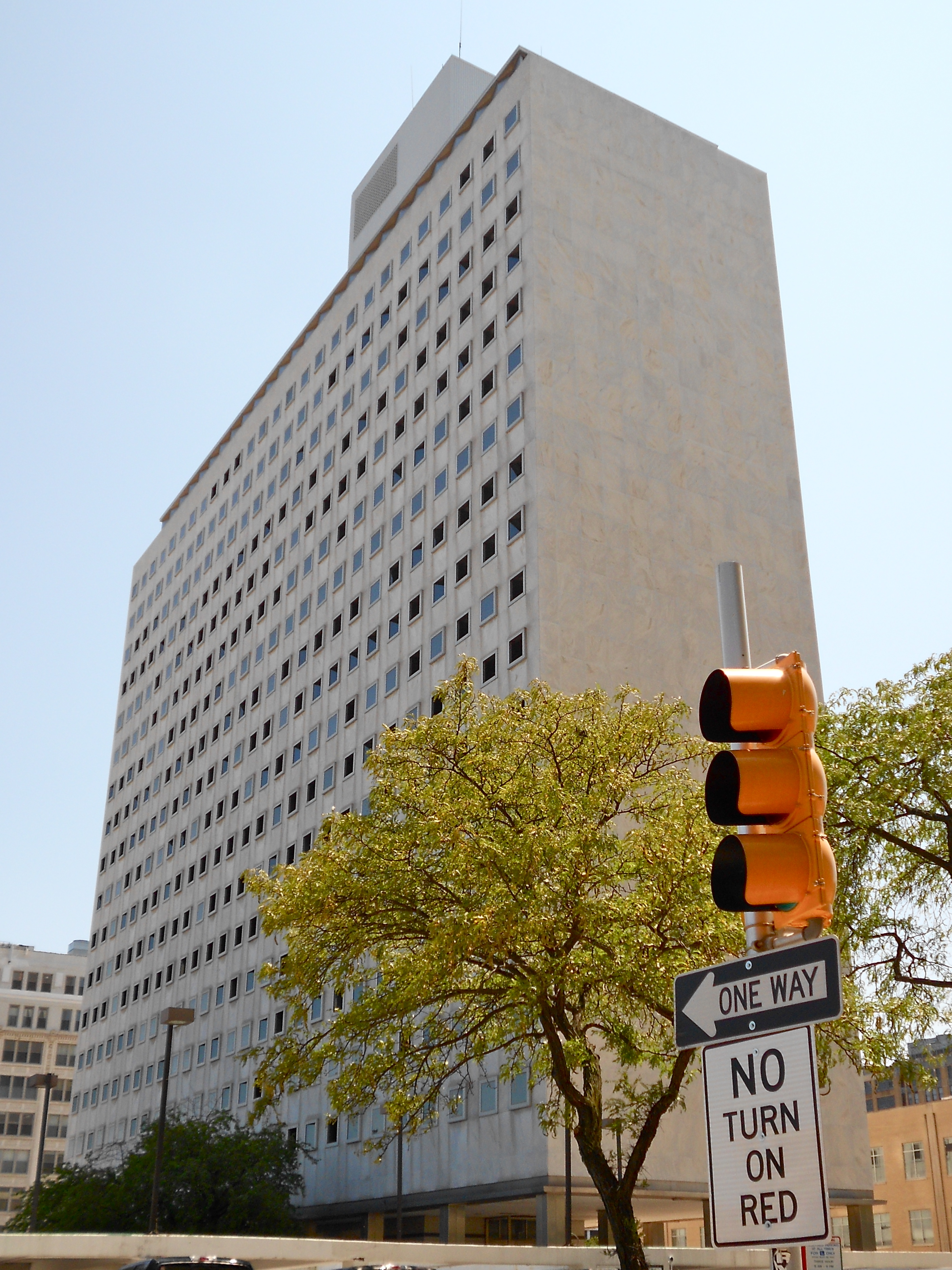
From the northwest
