= Hamburg Armory =

- U.S. National Register of Historic Places
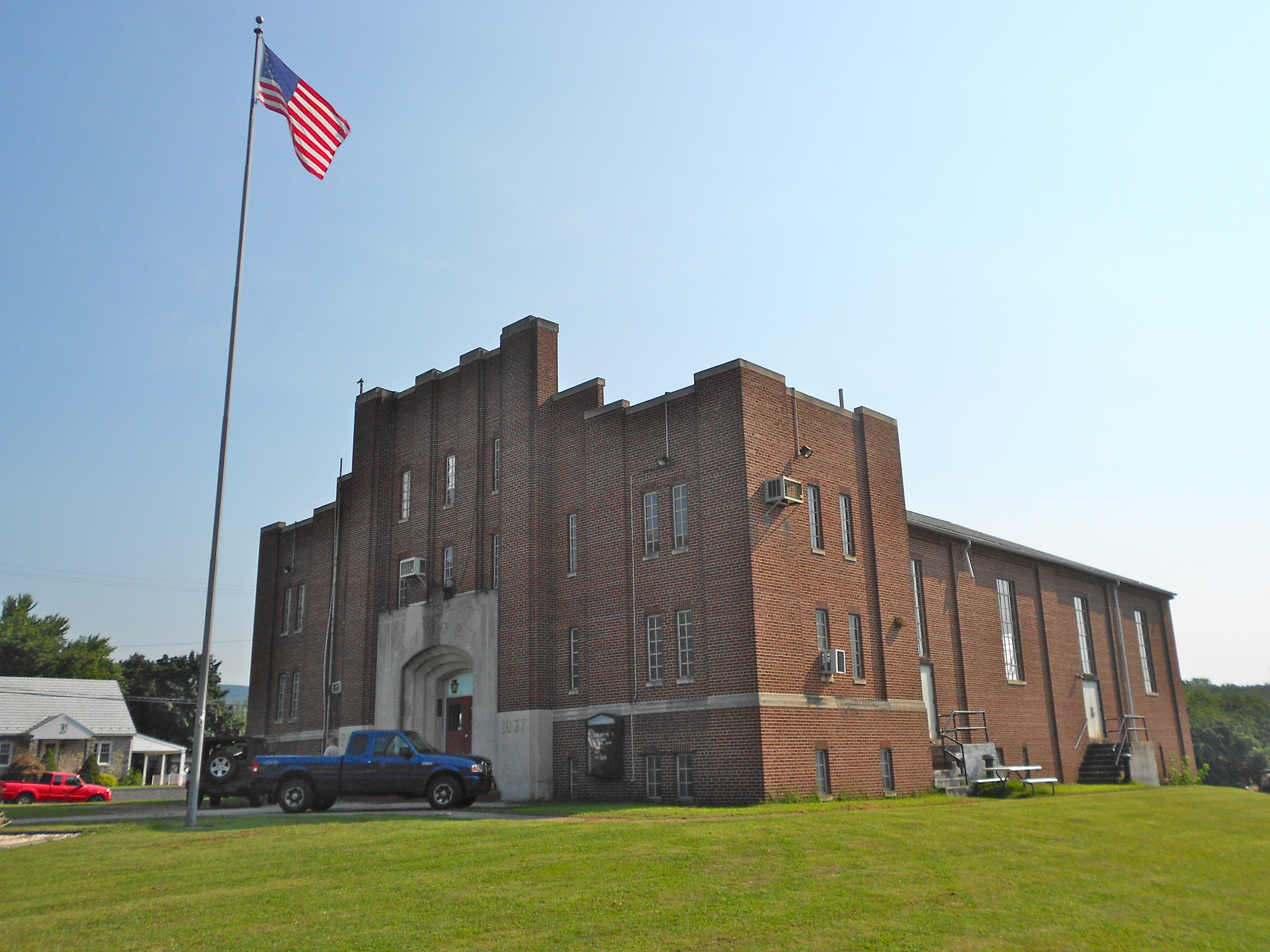

- Location within Pennsylvania Location within the United States
- Location: N. Fifth St., S of I-78, Hamburg, Pennsylvania
- Coordinates: 40°33′41″N 75°58′49″W
- Area: 3.1 acres (1.3 ha)
- Built: 1938-1939
- Architect: Adams, Elmer H. and Kostecky, John M., Jr.
- Architectural style: Art Deco
- MPS: Pennsylvania National Guard Armories MPS
- NRHP reference No.: 91000511
- Added to NRHP: May 9, 1991

The Hamburg Armory is an historic National Guard armory which is located in Hamburg, Berks County, Pennsylvania.

It was added to the National Register of Historic Places in 1991.

== History and architectural features ==
Built between 1938 and 1939, the Hamburg Armory is a T-shaped building consisting of a three-and-one-half-story, front administration section and 2 1/2-story, rear drill hall. A one-story addition was erected in 1972. The building was designed in the Art Deco style, and was constructed of brick. It sits on a concrete foundation.

== Gallery ==
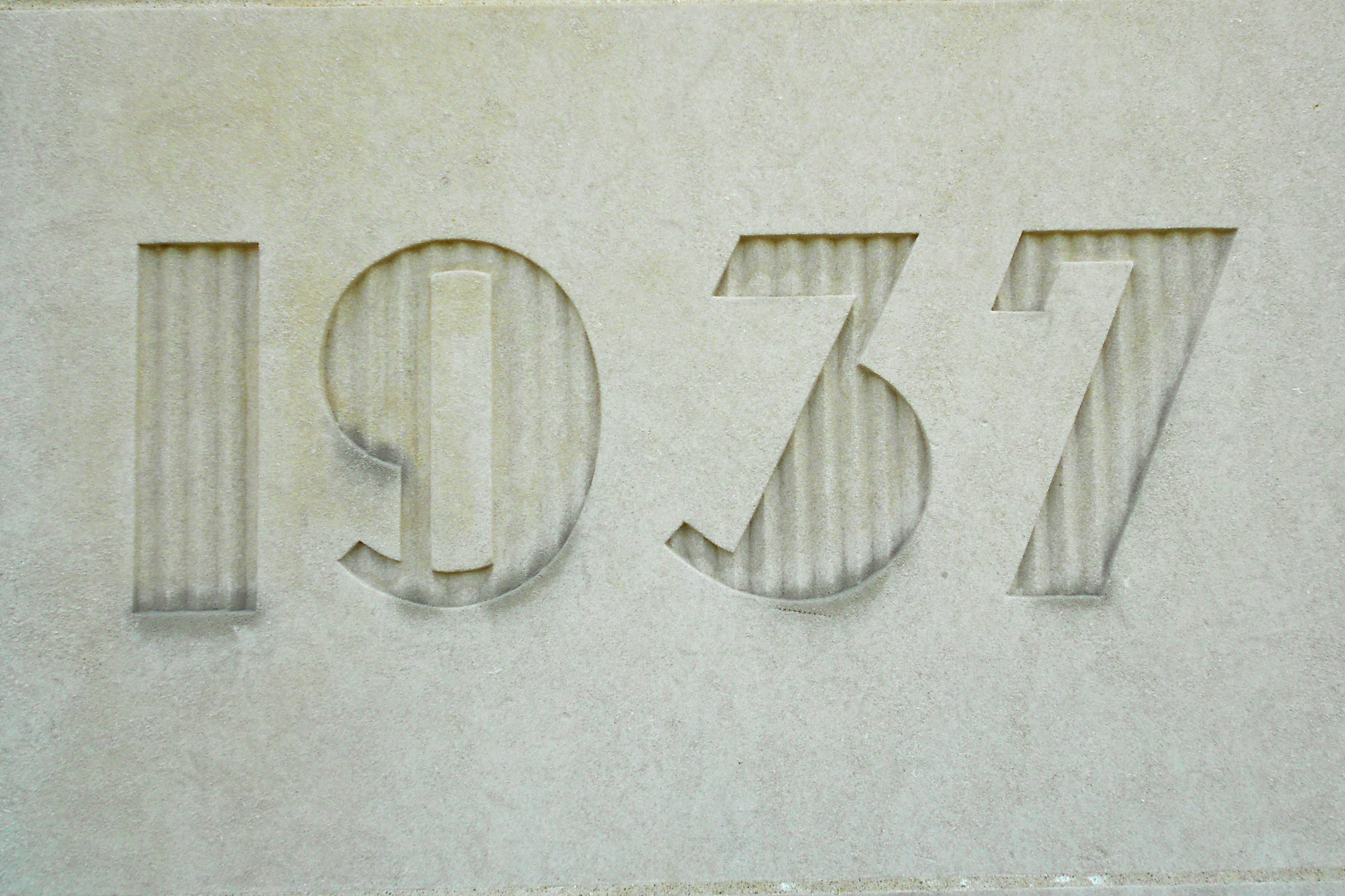
Datestone in the Art Deco style

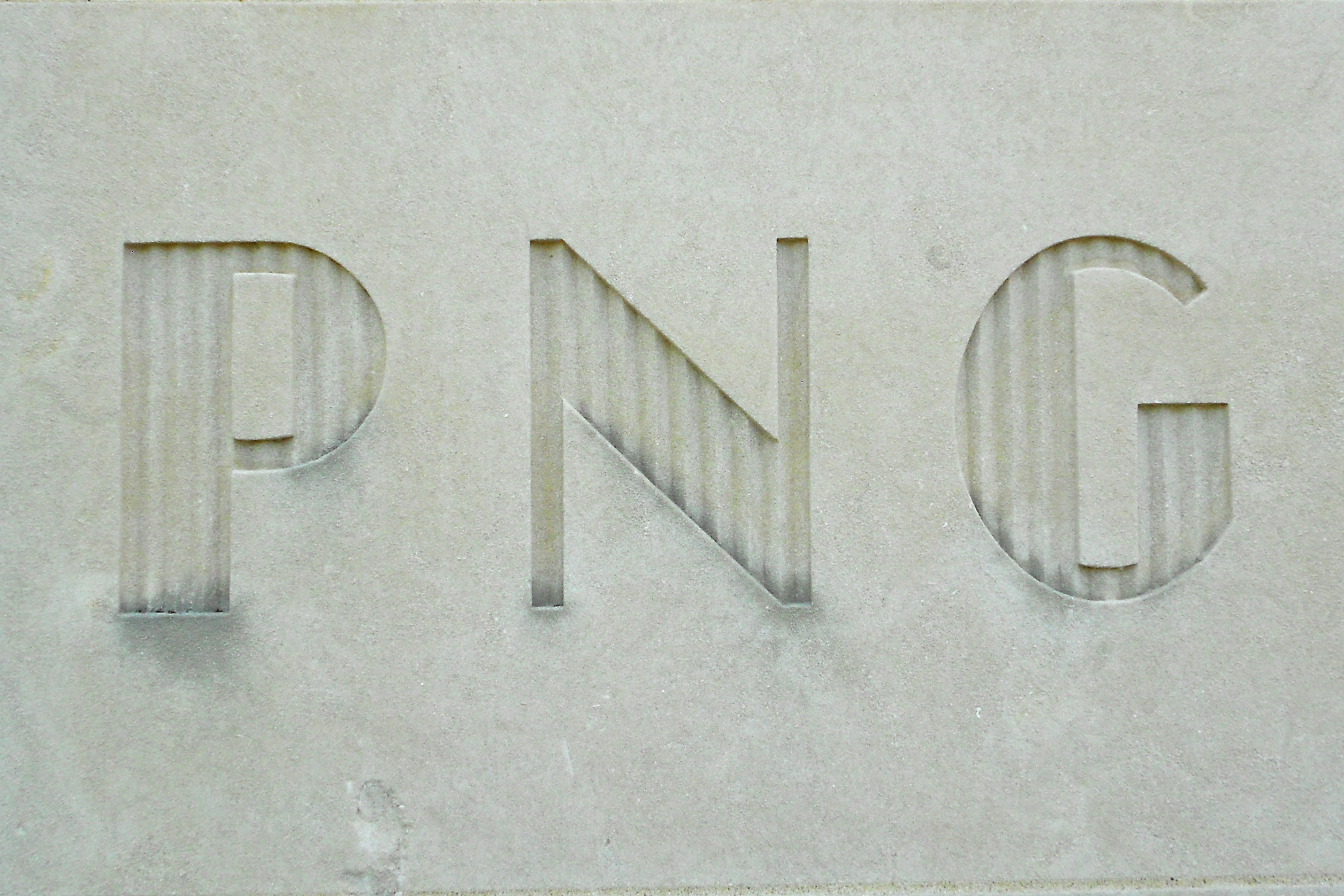
"PNG" (Pennsylvania National Guard) carved in stone
