= Pittsburgh History and Landmarks Foundation =

Nonprofit organization founded in 1964

Pittsburgh History & Landmarks Foundation
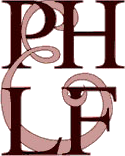
- Formation: 1964; 62 years ago
- Type: Non-profit
- Purpose: To support and encourage the preservation of historic buildings, landmarks, districts, structures, and neighborhoods in Pittsburgh, Pennsylvania, United States.
- Location(s): 100 West Station Square Drive, Suite 450 Pittsburgh, Pennsylvania 15219-1134
- Region served: Primarily Pittsburgh and Allegheny County, Pennsylvania
- Website: www.phlf.org

The Pittsburgh History & Landmarks Foundation (PHLF) is a nonprofit organization founded in 1964 to support the preservation of historic buildings and neighborhoods in Pittsburgh, Pennsylvania, United States.

In 1966, PHLF established the Revolving Fund for Preservation with a $100,000 grant from the Sarah Scaife Foundation. PHLF used the grant to purchase, restore and renovate historic inner-city properties primarily in the North Side and South Side neighborhoods of Pittsburgh, which were rented or sold to low- and moderate-income families.

== Allegheny County Survey ==
PHLF was the first historic preservation group in the nation to undertake a countywide survey of architectural landmarks, which Co-founders Arthur P. Ziegler Jr. and James D. Van Trump did in 1965.

The foundation's historic plaque program was begun in 1968, and since that time it has awarded over 500 plaques to designate significant historical structures within Allegheny County.

== Hamnett Place preservation and restoration ==
In 2004, the PHLF launched initiatives in partnership with its for-profit development affiliate, Landmark Development Corporation, to begin restoration work on historic structures in the Hamnett Place neighborhood of Wilkinsburg, Pennsylvania. Within a decade, more than 70 structures were improved, a new neighborhood center was opened, and the community's supply of affordable housing was increased. The collaborators were subsequently honored with the Richard H. Driehaus Foundation National Preservation Award in recognition of their accomplishments. During this time, the Hamnett Historic District was also established; that historic district was then approved on June 28, 2010, for listing on the National Register of Historic Places.

In 2015, the two affiliates entered into a collaboration with Falconhurst Development to begin an $11.5 million multi-site restoration within and near the Hamnett Historic District. In addition to restoring four vacant buildings which had been built sometime around the beginning of the 20th century, the developer had plans to open a series of new townhouses in the same area by 2016 with the collaborators again indicating that the housing would be affordable, based on United States Housing and Urban Development Department (HUD) guidelines. Ground was broken on the project in late September 2015.

== See also ==
- Hamnett Historic District
- List of Pittsburgh History and Landmarks Foundation Historic Landmarks
