= Hamburg, Pennsylvania =

Borough in Pennsylvania, US

Hamburg, Pennsylvania Hambarig
- Borough
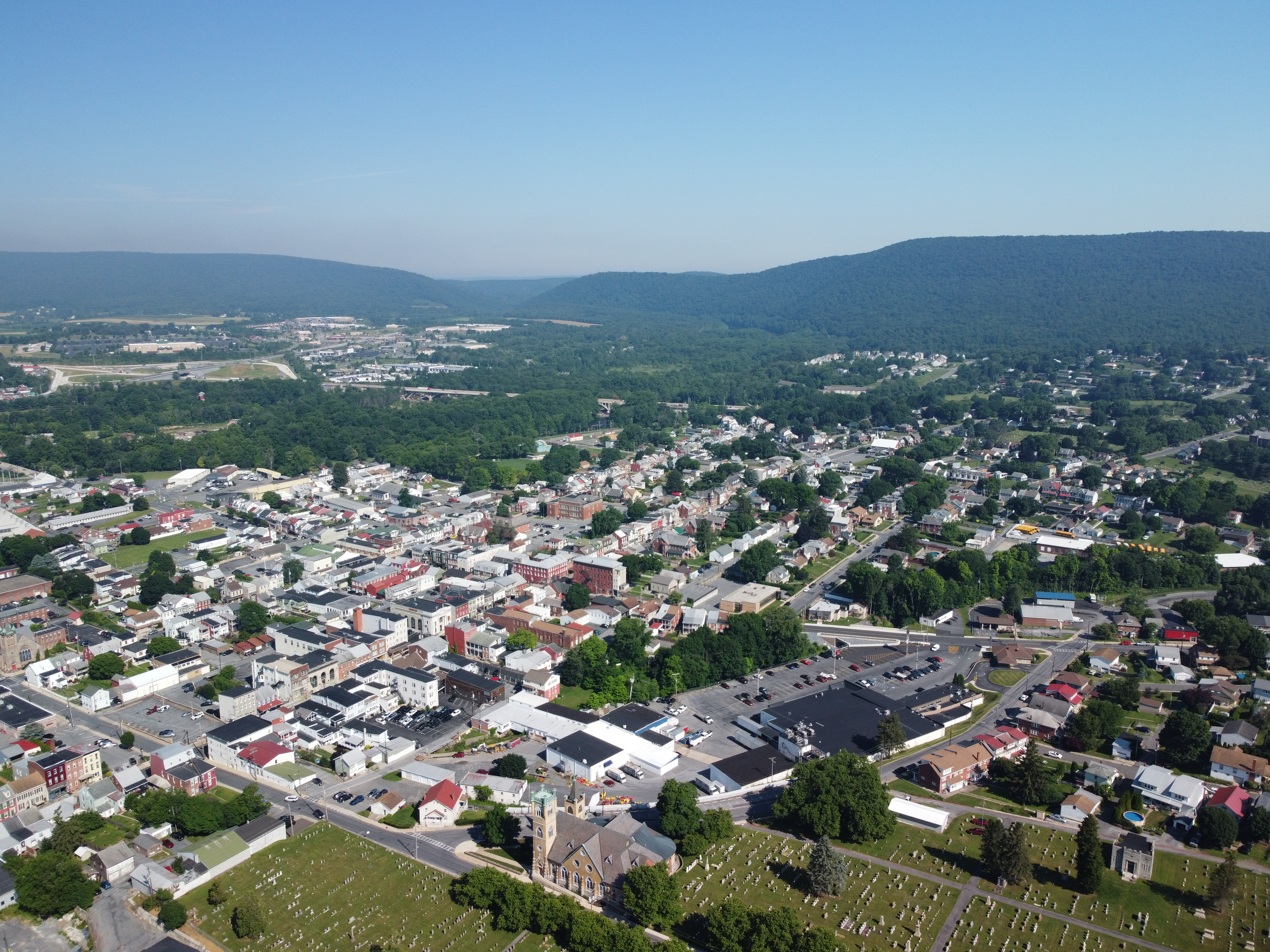
- Aerial view of Hamburg

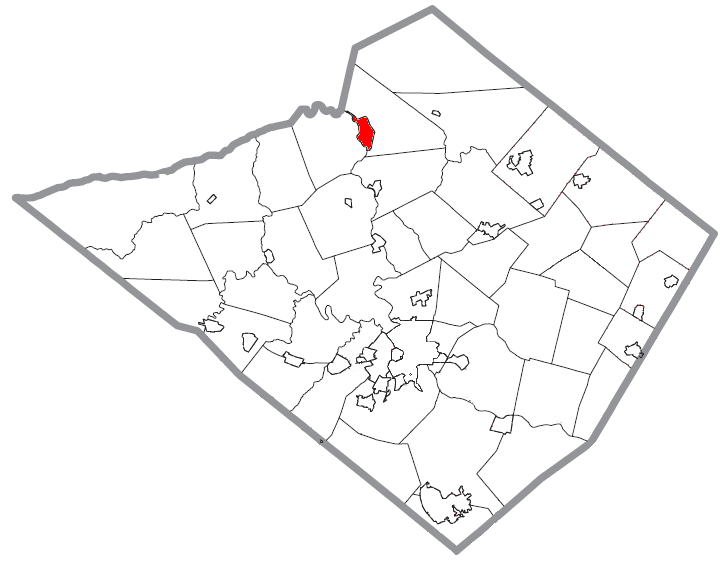
- Location of Hamburg in Berks County, Pennsylvania

- Location of Hamburg in Pennsylvania Hamburg (the United States)
- Coordinates: 40°33′N 75°59′W
- Country: United States
- State: Pennsylvania
- County: Berks

Area
  - Total: 1.96 sq mi (5.08 km^{2})
  - Land: 1.89 sq mi (4.89 km^{2})
  - Water: 0.073 sq mi (0.19 km^{2})
- Elevation: 397 ft (121 m)

Population (2020)
  - Total: 4,270
  - Density: 2,262/sq mi (873.5/km^{2})
- Time zone: UTC-5 (EST)
  - Summer (DST): UTC-4 (EDT)
- ZIP Code: 19526
- Area codes: 610 and 484
- FIPS code: 42-32120
- Website: hamburgboro.com

Hamburg (Pennsylvania German: Hambarig) is a borough in Berks County, Pennsylvania, United States. The population was 4,270 at the 2020 census. The town is thought to have been named after Hamburg, Germany; but it is likely that the name instead originates from a corruption of Bad Homburg.

== Geography ==
Hamburg is located in northern Berks County at 40°33′0″N 75°59′0″W (40.556271, −75.982667), on the east bank of the Schuylkill River. It is bordered on the north, east, and south by Windsor Township and on the west, across the river, by West Hamburg in Tilden Township.

According to the U.S. Census Bureau, Hamburg has a total area of 1.9 square miles (5.0 km^{2}), 1.9 square miles (4.9 km^{2}) of which is land and 0.08 square miles (0.2 km^{2}), or 3.55%, of which is water.

=== Climate ===
It has a hot-summer humid continental climate (Dfa) and average monthly temperatures range from 28.4 °F in January to 73.4 °F in July. The hardiness zone is 6b.

Climate data for Hamburg, Pennsylvania (1991–2020 normals, extremes 1894–present)
Month	Jan	Feb	Mar	Apr	May	Jun	Jul	Aug	Sep	Oct	Nov	Dec	Year
Record high °F (°C)	69 (21)	78 (26)	88 (31)	95 (35)	97 (36)	102 (39)	107 (42)	103 (39)	100 (38)	89 (32)	80 (27)	75 (24)	107 (42)
Mean daily maximum °F (°C)	37.7 (3.2)	40.6 (4.8)	49.9 (9.9)	62.5 (16.9)	72.6 (22.6)	80.9 (27.2)	85.3 (29.6)	83.1 (28.4)	76.1 (24.5)	64.3 (17.9)	52.6 (11.4)	42.0 (5.6)	62.3 (16.8)
Daily mean °F (°C)	28.8 (−1.8)	31.2 (−0.4)	39.9 (4.4)	51.1 (10.6)	61.4 (16.3)	70.3 (21.3)	74.8 (23.8)	72.8 (22.7)	65.4 (18.6)	53.4 (11.9)	42.9 (6.1)	33.8 (1.0)	52.1 (11.2)
Mean daily minimum °F (°C)	20.0 (−6.7)	21.9 (−5.6)	30.0 (−1.1)	39.8 (4.3)	50.3 (10.2)	59.6 (15.3)	64.4 (18.0)	62.5 (16.9)	54.7 (12.6)	42.4 (5.8)	33.2 (0.7)	25.6 (−3.6)	42.0 (5.6)
Record low °F (°C)	−20 (−29)	−13 (−25)	−1 (−18)	10 (−12)	28 (−2)	35 (2)	37 (3)	39 (4)	30 (−1)	17 (−8)	6 (−14)	−10 (−23)	−20 (−29)
Average precipitation inches (mm)	3.45 (88)	2.73 (69)	3.70 (94)	3.72 (94)	4.08 (104)	4.96 (126)	5.15 (131)	4.92 (125)	5.09 (129)	4.47 (114)	3.32 (84)	3.89 (99)	49.48 (1,257)
Average snowfall inches (cm)	5.1 (13)	7.1 (18)	4.6 (12)	0.3 (0.76)	0.0 (0.0)	0.0 (0.0)	0.0 (0.0)	0.0 (0.0)	0.0 (0.0)	0.0 (0.0)	0.5 (1.3)	3.7 (9.4)	21.3 (54)
Average precipitation days (≥ 0.01 in)	11.1	9.1	10.4	12.0	13.7	12.3	11.4	11.3	10.2	11.2	9.3	10.6	132.6
Average snowy days (≥ 0.1 in)	4.3	3.6	2.1	0.1	0.0	0.0	0.0	0.0	0.0	0.0	0.4	2.0	12.5
Source: NOAA

== Demographics ==
Historical population
Census	Pop.	Note	%±
1800	329		—
1830	560		—
1850	1,035		—
1860	1,334		28.9%
1870	1,590		19.2%
1880	2,010		26.4%
1890	2,127		5.8%
1900	2,315		8.8%
1910	2,301		−0.6%
1920	2,764		20.1%
1930	3,637		31.6%
1940	3,717		2.2%
1950	3,805		2.4%
1960	3,747		−1.5%
1970	3,909		4.3%
1980	4,011		2.6%
1990	3,987		−0.6%
2000	4,114		3.2%
2010	4,289		4.3%
2020	4,270		−0.4%

=== 2020 census ===
As of the 2020 census, Hamburg had a population of 4,270. The median age was 42.8 years. 19.0% of residents were under the age of 18 and 21.5% of residents were 65 years of age or older. For every 100 females there were 94.2 males, and for every 100 females age 18 and over there were 91.5 males age 18 and over.

98.7% of residents lived in urban areas, while 1.3% lived in rural areas.

There were 1,941 households in Hamburg, of which 24.7% had children under the age of 18 living in them. Of all households, 39.4% were married-couple households, 20.5% were households with a male householder and no spouse or partner present, and 29.8% were households with a female householder and no spouse or partner present. About 34.4% of all households were made up of individuals and 17.6% had someone living alone who was 65 years of age or older.

There were 2,053 housing units, of which 5.5% were vacant. The homeowner vacancy rate was 2.0% and the rental vacancy rate was 5.3%.

Racial composition as of the 2020 census
Race	Number	Percent
White	3,883	90.9%
Black or African American	66	1.5%
American Indian and Alaska Native	5	0.1%
Asian	24	0.6%
Native Hawaiian and Other Pacific Islander	1	0.0%
Some other race	78	1.8%
Two or more races	213	5.0%
Hispanic or Latino (of any race)	252	5.9%

=== 2000 census ===
As of the census of 2000, there were 4,114 people, 1,824 households, and 1,156 families residing in the borough. The population density was 2,212.2 inhabitants per square mile (854.1/km^{2}). There were 1,932 housing units at an average density of 1,038.9 per square mile (401.1/km^{2}). The racial makeup of the borough was 97.91% White, 0.34% African American, 0.12% Native American, 0.32% Asian, 0.49% from other races, and 0.83% from two or more races. Hispanic or Latino of any race were 0.83% of the population.

There were 1,824 households, out of which 25.7% had children under the age of 18 living with them, 50.7% were married couples living together, 9.1% had a female householder with no husband present, and 36.6% were non-families. 31.9% of all households were made up of individuals, and 16.9% had someone living alone who was 65 years of age or older. The average household size was 2.26 and the average family size was 2.82.

In the borough the population was spread out, with 21.1% under the age of 18, 7.2% from 18 to 24, 27.8% from 25 to 44, 23.4% from 45 to 64, and 20.6% who were 65 years of age or older. The median age was 40 years. For every 100 females, there were 88.8 males. For every 100 females age 18 and over, there were 84.1 males.

The median income for a household in the borough was $37,683, and the median income for a family was $50,957. Males had a median income of $37,650 versus $22,308 for females. The per capita income for the borough was $20,689. About 5.1% of families and 6.2% of the population were below the poverty line, including 11.4% of those under age 18 and 4.2% of those age 65 or over.

== History ==
In 1779, Martin Kaerscher Jr. received 250 acres (1.0 km^{2}) of land from his father and divided it into building lots, naming the area "Kaercher Stadt". Hamburg was officially founded in 1787, generally thought to have been named after the "German Hamburg" due to the largely German population of the region. However, Martin Kaerscher Jr.'s father Johann Martin Kaerscher Sr. (1718–1787) emigrated in 1738 from Langenselbold in Hessia (then under Isenburg) which is far from the northern seaport of Hamburg, so it is likely that "Hamburg" is a corruption of Bad Homburg due to the Blue Mountains' very similar appearance to the Taunus mountain range.

On July 1, 1798, Hamburg became the second town with postal designation in Berks County, preceded only by Reading.

The Centre Turnpike was created in 1812, running between the Reading and Pottsville. Hamburg began to grow rapidly due to the close proximity of a major roadway. Eight years later, the Schuylkill Canal was completed, followed quickly by railroad lines. Both of these advances in infrastructure had stops in Hamburg and helped spur population growth.

In 1837, Hamburg was officially organized as a borough.

The Hamburg Historic District, Hamburg Armory, and Hamburg Public Library are listed on the National Register of Historic Places.

== Education ==
The Hamburg Area School District is geographically the largest in all of Berks County with a size of 103 square miles (270 km^{2}). Within this area there are on average 2600 students, ranging from kindergarten to high school. The school district includes the towns of Hamburg and Shoemakersville, as well as the rural townships of Perry, Tilden, Upper Bern, Upper Tulpehocken, and Windsor.

There are two elementary schools, one located in Tilden Township and the other located in Shoemakersville, that teach to students K-5. From there both schools combine into one middle school, grades 6–8, and then finally one high school, grades 9–12. Both the high school and middle school are located within Hamburg and are separated by less than 0.5 miles (800 m). There is also a nearby private high school, Blue Mountain Academy grades 9–12, that has an average enrollment of 204 students.

Of the 10 churches located in the Hamburg area, six of them offer a weekly Sunday or Sabbath school services. Many of these churches also have preschool programs for children too young to attend kindergarten.

== Transportation ==
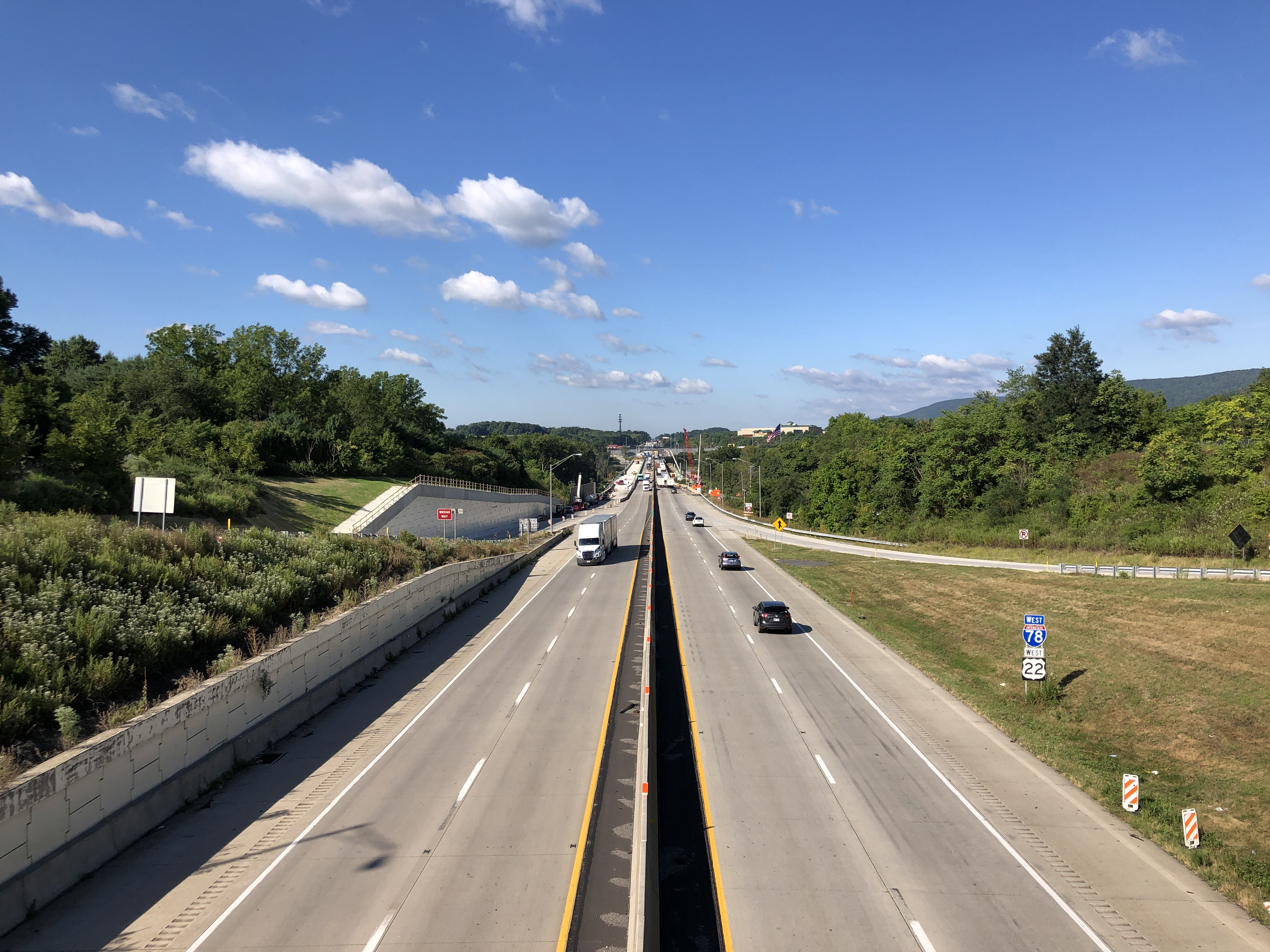
I-78/US 22 westbound in Hamburg

As of 2015, there were 24.49 miles (39.41 km) of public roads in Hamburg, of which 5.03 miles (8.10 km) were maintained by the Pennsylvania Department of Transportation (PennDOT) and 19.46 miles (31.32 km) were maintained by the borough.

The Interstate 78/U.S. Route 22 freeway passes through the borough, with access from Exit 30 (North 4th Street). It is 28 miles (45 km) west of Allentown and 54 miles (87 km) east of Harrisburg, the state capital. Pennsylvania Route 61 passes through the southern part of the borough, leading south 16 miles (26 km) to Reading and north 18 miles (29 km) to Pottsville.

Berks Area Regional Transportation Authority (BARTA) provides bus service to Hamburg along Route 20, which heads south along PA 61 to the BARTA Transportation Center in Reading. There is a park and ride lot at the Redner's in Hamburg that is served by BARTA. Schuylkill Transportation System provides bus service to Hamburg along Route 80, which heads north into Schuylkill County to Union Station Intermodal Transit Center in Pottsville.

Passenger rail service connected Hamburg at one time to Reading and Philadelphia to the east and Pottsville to the west via the Philadelphia and Reading main line. Service ended in 1981 when SEPTA discontinued the Pottsville Line. The Reading Blue Mountain and Northern Railroad provides freight service to Hamburg, with a branch line running south from Hamburg to Temple and its Reading Division mainline passing through West Hamburg.

== Attractions ==
The Reading Railroad Heritage Museum, located at 500 S 3rd Street, is dedicated to the preservation of the Reading Railroad. Featuring a permanent model train layout and several pieces of rolling stock from various eras before the Conrail merger in 1976, the museum is open year-round on Saturdays and Sundays.

== Notable people ==
- Bill Beckley, narrative and conceptual artist
- Richard Etchberger, United States Air Force member awarded Medal of Honor in Vietnam War
- Jack Rowe, professional baseball player
- Fern Shollenberger, professional baseball player

== See also ==
- Hahn Fire Apparatus
