= Hamburg Public Library (Hamburg, Pennsylvania) =

- U.S. National Register of Historic Places
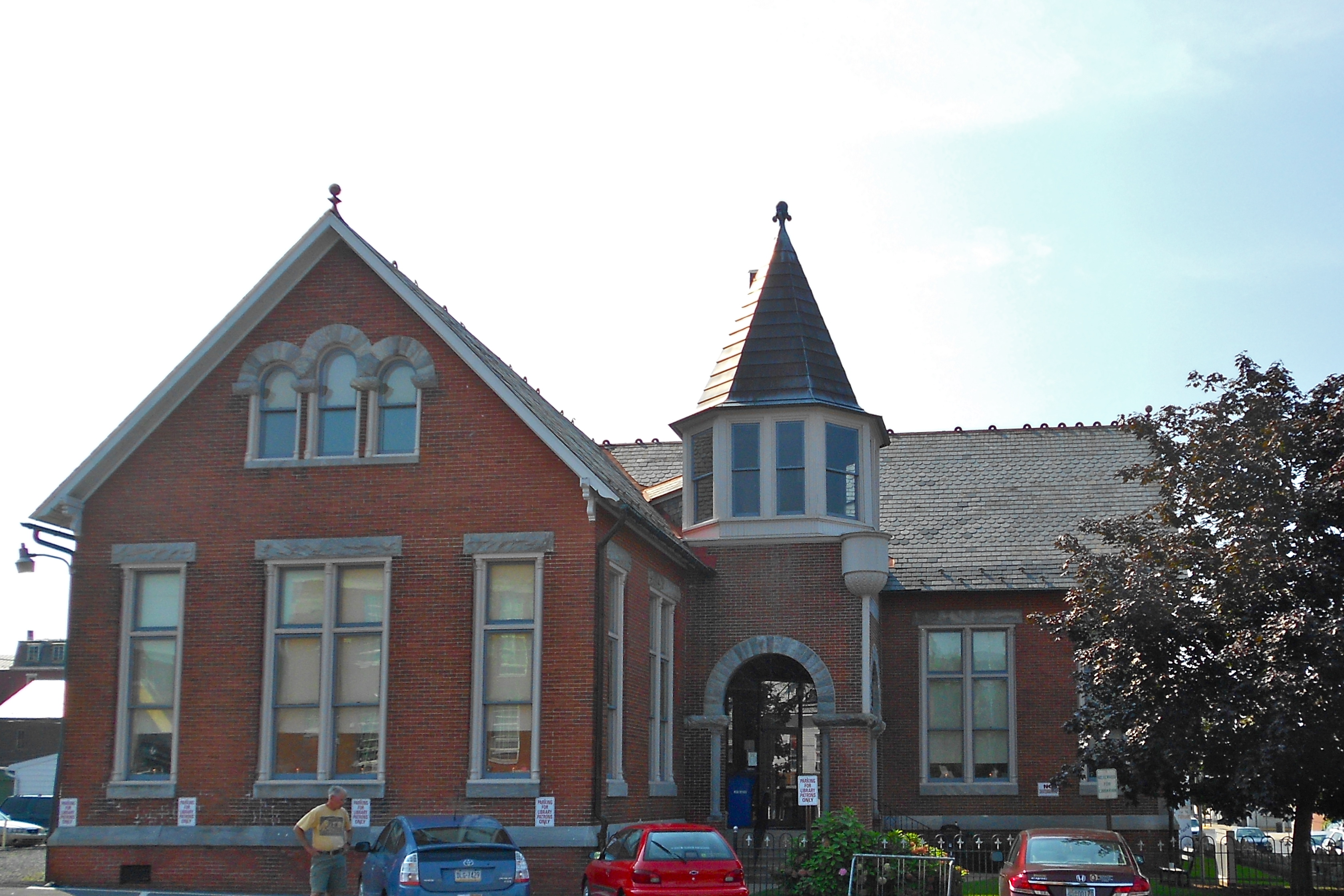

- Location within Pennsylvania Location within the United States
- Location: 35 N. Third St., Hamburg, Pennsylvania
- Coordinates: 40°33′21″N 75°59′4″W
- Area: 0.1 acres (0.040 ha)
- Built: 1903-1904
- Built by: Seaman, Charles F.
- Architect: Driebilbis, Monroe M.
- Architectural style: Romanesque Revival
- NRHP reference No.: 88002369
- Added to NRHP: November 3, 1988

The Hamburg Public Library is an historic library building which is located in Hamburg, Berks County, Pennsylvania.

It was added to the National Register of Historic Places in 1988.

== History and architectural features ==
Designed and built between 1903 and 1904, with funds provided in part by the philanthropist Andrew Carnegie, the Hamburg Public Library is one of three thousand similar public libraries that were constructed between 1885 and 1919.

The building is an L-shaped, 1 1/2-story, brick structure, which was designed in the Romanesque Revival style. The entrance features a small courtyard and square portico, which is topped by an octagonal turret. The interior features an octagonal rotunda.

== Gallery ==
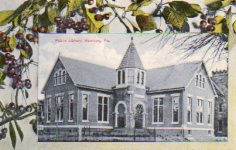
A 1907 postcard

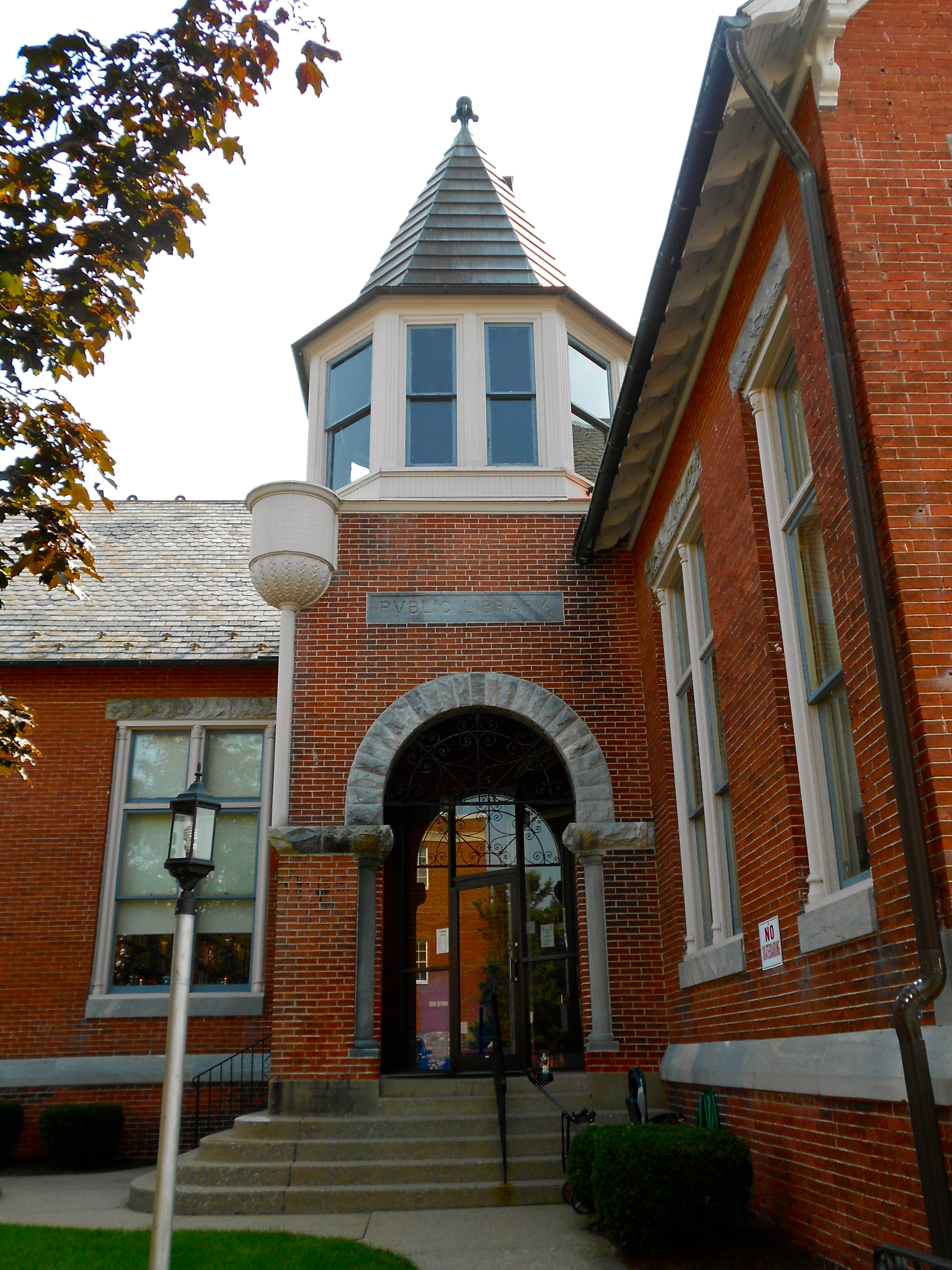
Entrance

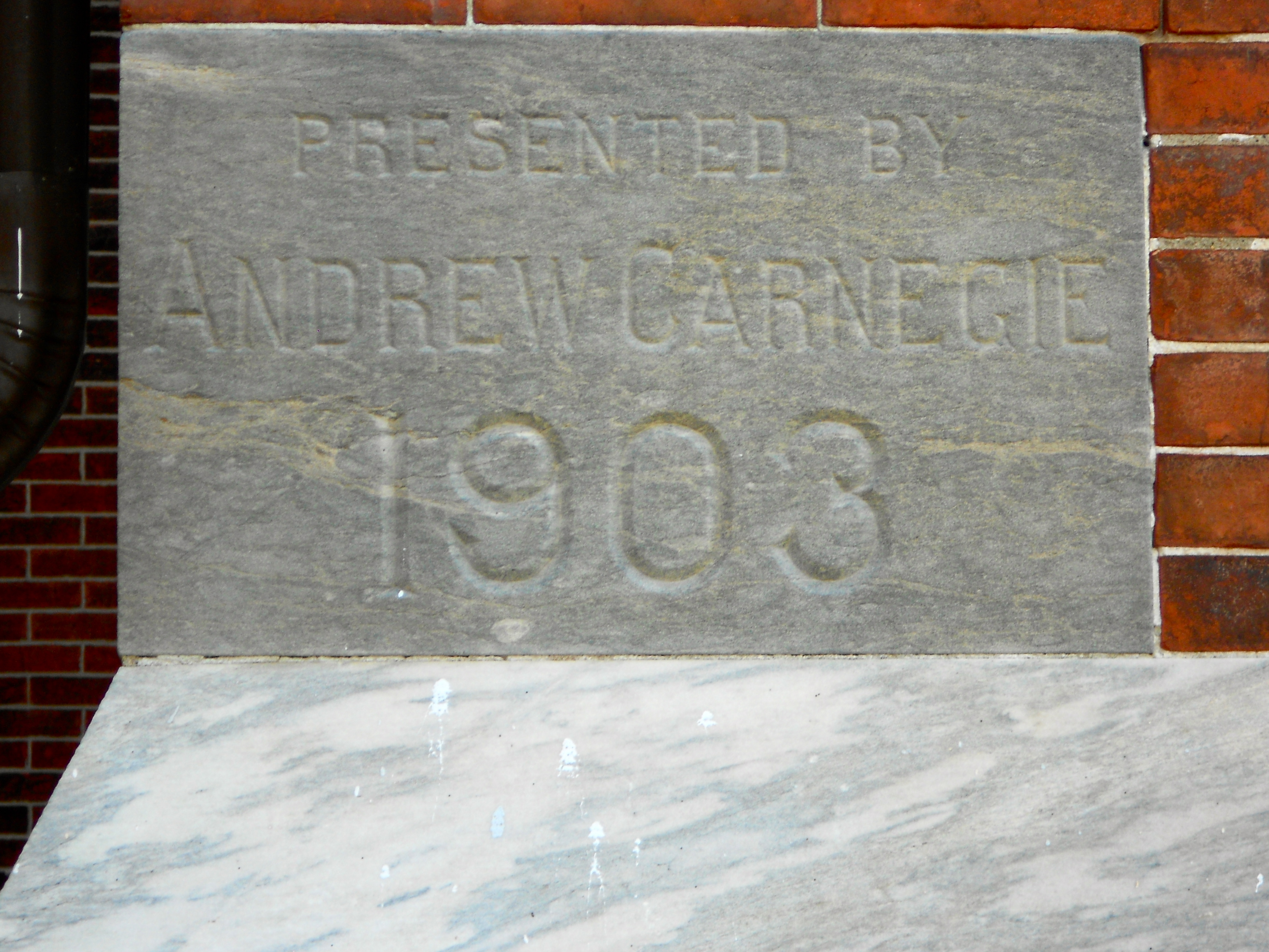
Cornerstone

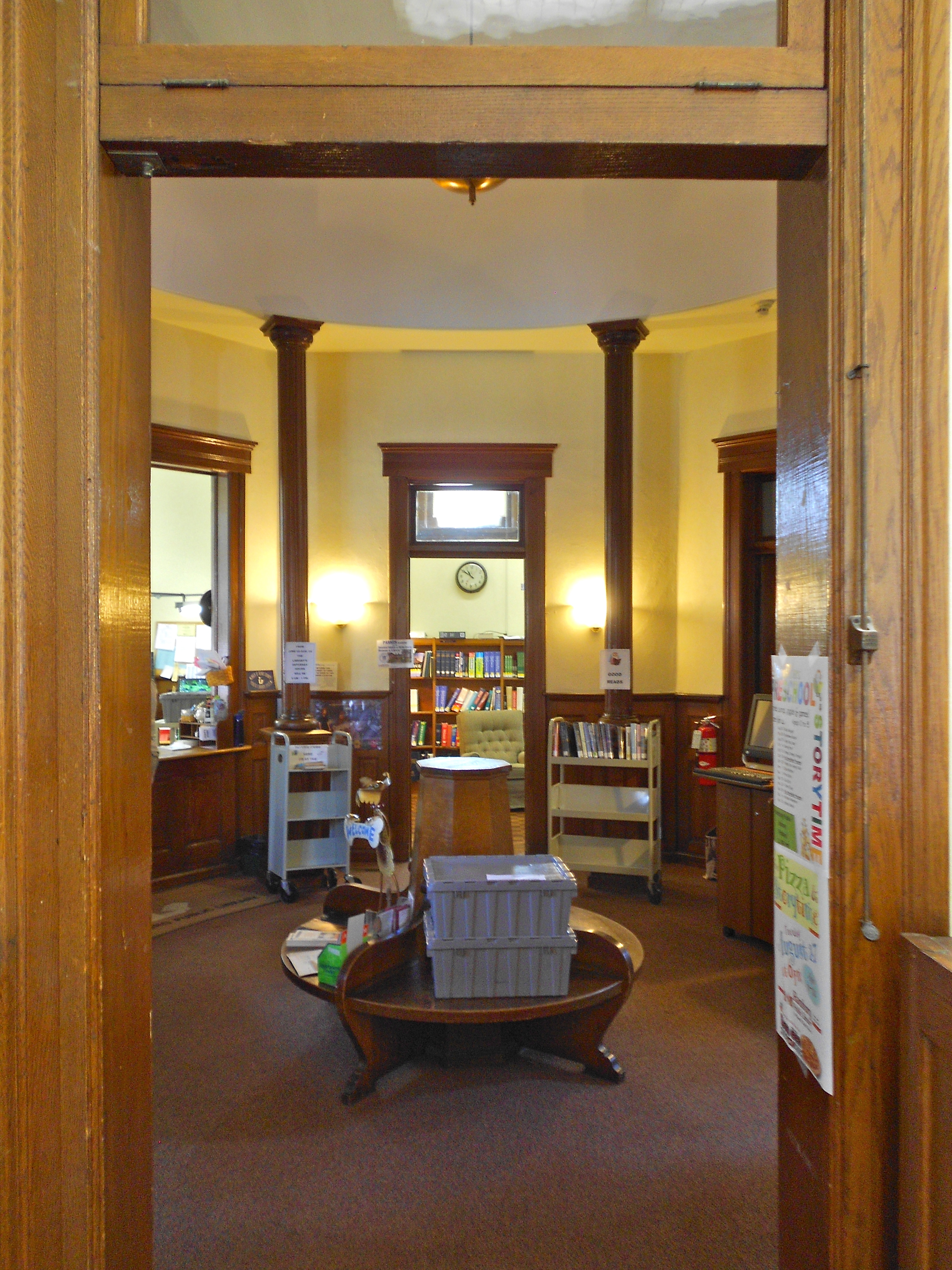
Rotunda, looking north

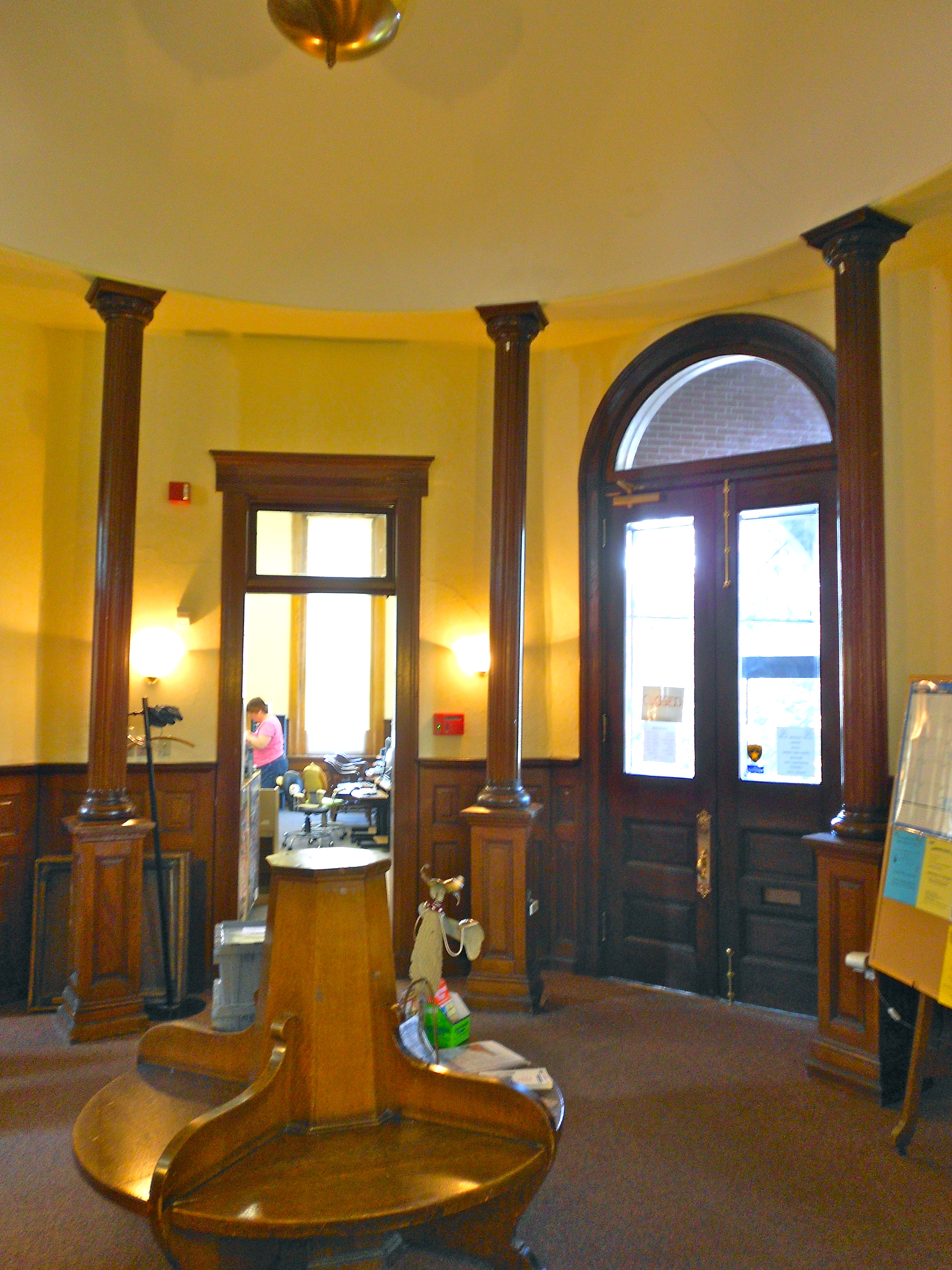
Rotunda, looking south
