= Philadelphia Quartermaster Depot =

- U.S. National Register of Historic Places
- Pennsylvania state historical marker
- The Art Deco clocktower dates from the late 1930s.

- Location within Pennsylvania
- Location: 2724 South 20th Street, Philadelphia, Pennsylvania
- Coordinates: 39°54′59″N 75°10′57″W
- Architects: Wark and Company, The Ballinger Company
- Architectural style: Art Deco
- NRHP reference No.: 09001212

Significant dates
- Added to NRHP: January 26, 2010
- Designated PHMC: June 10, 2004

The Philadelphia Quartermaster Depot, is a former military complex in the Girard Estates neighborhood of South Philadelphia. It was founded as the Schuylkill Arsenal in 1799 and later known as the Defense Logistics Agency Troop Support. The western portion of the facility was razed for development as a shopping center in 2004; the remaining buildings have been repurposed as office, storage, and light industrial commercial space.

== History ==
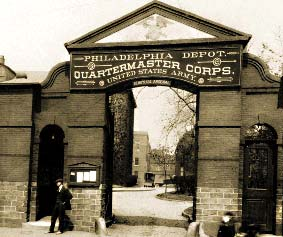
The South 20th Street entrance to the complex during active use by the US Army

The Schuylkill Arsenal was built in 1800 to function as a US Quartermaster command post and provide the U.S. military with supplies. One of its most famous tasks was outfitting the Lewis and Clark Expedition. It was the third federal facility in the young nation.

The arsenal made clothing and flags for all the military's needs for the next 150 years.

In 1926 the Schuylkill Arsenal was renamed the Philadelphia Quartermaster Depot. In the 1930s, the depot was commanded by William A. McCain and was responsible for clothing the Civilian Conservation Corps in the 1930s and the army during World War II. The original site at Grays Ferry Avenue and Washington Avenue was closed and the site was razed in 1963. The functions of the Quartermaster Depot were all moved to West Oregon Avenue & South 22nd Street. One extant warehouse, built in 1942, was the largest concrete building in the United States at the time.

In 1965 the operation was reorganized into the Defense Personnel Support Center. In 1993 the government closed the textile factory and moved the remaining part of the South Philadelphia operation to the Naval Support Station in Northeast Philadelphia. It was renamed the Defense Supply Center Philadelphia (DSCP) in 1998, and was renamed Defense Logistics Agency Troop Support, or DLA Troop Support, in 2010.

The Philadelphia Quartermaster Depot consists of eleven extant buildings built between 1939 and 1942. The buildings are of varying heights and sizes, but are consistently clad in tan or brown brick and are in the Art Deco-style.

=== Placement of this property on the National Register of Historic Places ===
Philadelphia's application to place the Philadelphia Quartermaster Depot on the National Register of Historic Places was reviewed by the Historic Preservation Board of the Pennsylvania Historical and Museum Commission at its meeting on October 6, 2009, along with applications for: the Hamburg Historic District in Hamburg, Pennsylvania, the Hamnett Historic District in Wilkinsburg, Pennsylvania, the Newville Historic District in Newville, Pennsylvania, the Pennsylvania State Office Building in Philadelphia, the Experimental and Safety Research Coal Mines in Allegheny County's South Park Township, and the Cheney Farm, Hopewell Farm, and Chandler Mill Road Bridge in Chester County.

The Philadelphia Quartermaster Depot was then officially listed on the National Register of Historic Places later in 2010.

== See also ==
- Philadelphia Naval Asylum
- Defense Logistics Agency
- Philadelphia Navy Yard
- United States Army Quartermaster Corps
