= Upper Bern Township, Pennsylvania =

Township in Pennsylvania, US

Upper Bern Township
- Township
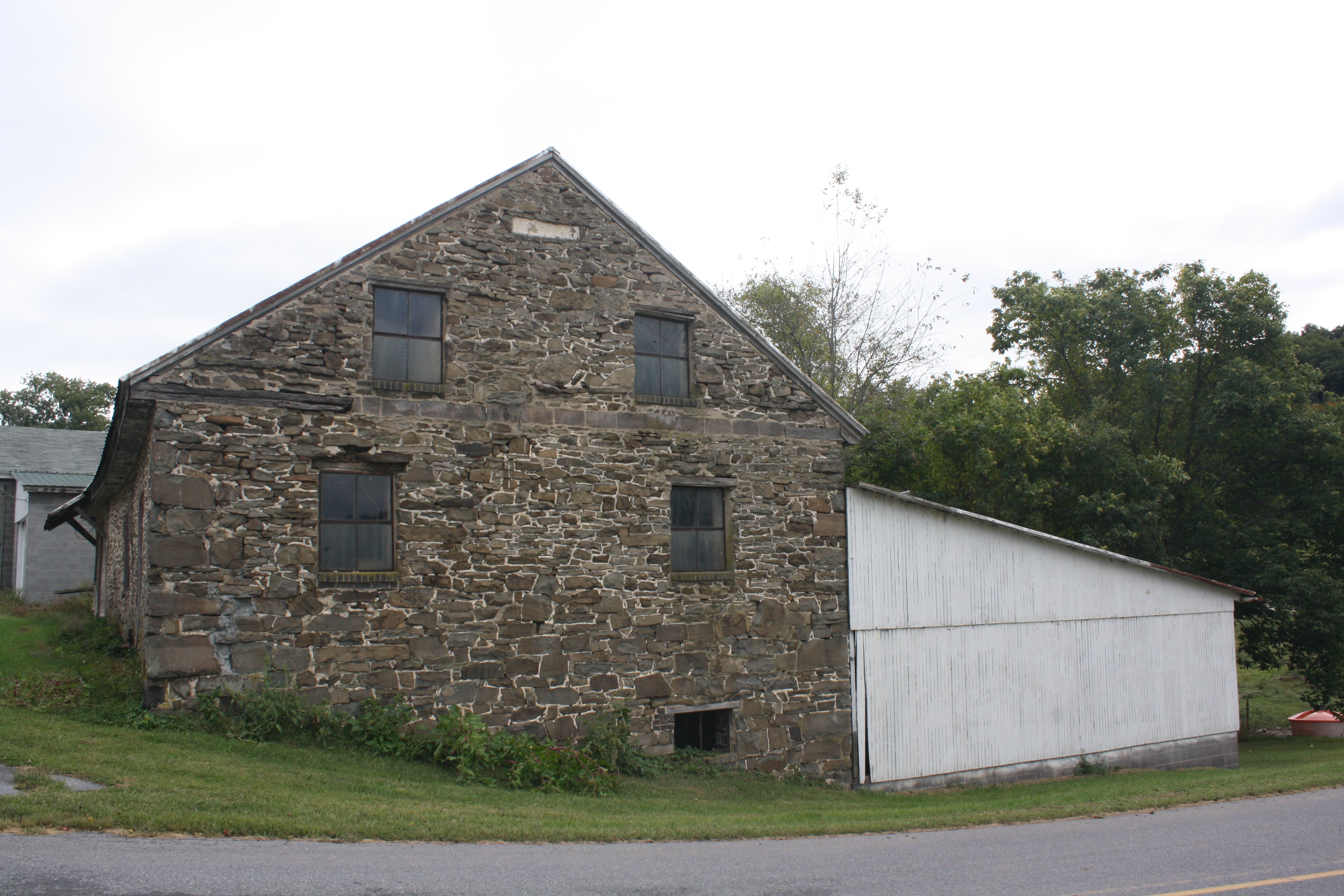
- Kauffman Mill

- Location of Upper Bern Township in Pennsylvania Upper Bern Township (the United States)
- Coordinates: 40°29′30″N 76°07′23″W
- Country: United States
- State: Pennsylvania
- County: Berks

Area
  - Total: 18.2 sq mi (47 km^{2})
  - Land: 18.2 sq mi (47 km^{2})
  - Water: 0.0 sq mi (0 km^{2})
- Elevation: 479 ft (146 m)

Population (2010)
  - Total: 1,734
  - Estimate (2016): 1,741
  - Density: 81/sq mi (31/km^{2})
- Time zone: UTC-5 (EST)
  - Summer (DST): UTC-4 (EDT)
- ZIP Codes: 19506, 19526, 19554
- Area code: 610
- FIPS code: 42-011-78752
- Website: https://upperberntownship.org/

Upper Bern Township is a township in Berks County, Pennsylvania, United States. The population was 1,734 at the 2010 census.

== History ==
The township derives its name from Bern, in Switzerland.

The Kauffman Mill was listed on the National Register of Historic Places in 1990 .

== Geography ==
According to the U.S. Census Bureau, the township has a total area of 18.2 square miles (47.3 km^{2}), all land. It is in the Schuylkill watershed and the Northkill Creek and Blue Mountain form its natural western and northern boundaries, respectively. Interstate 78 crosses Upper Bern west-to-east with an interchange in the village of Shartlesville.

Adjacent townships

- Tilden Township (east)
- Centre Township (southeast)
- Penn Township (south)
- Upper Tulpehocken Township (west)
- South Manheim Township, Schuylkill County (north)

== Demographics ==
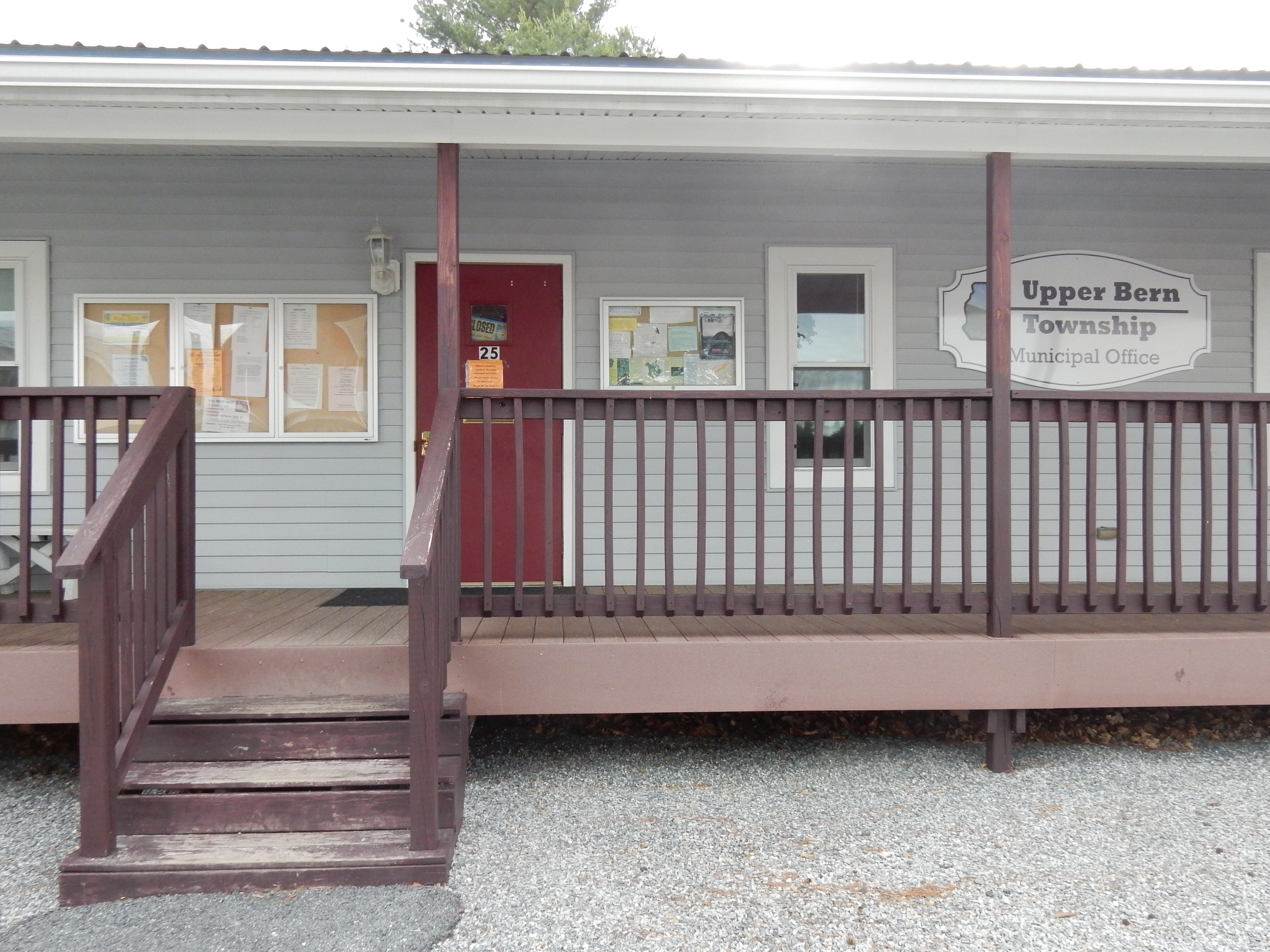
Township Municipal Office.

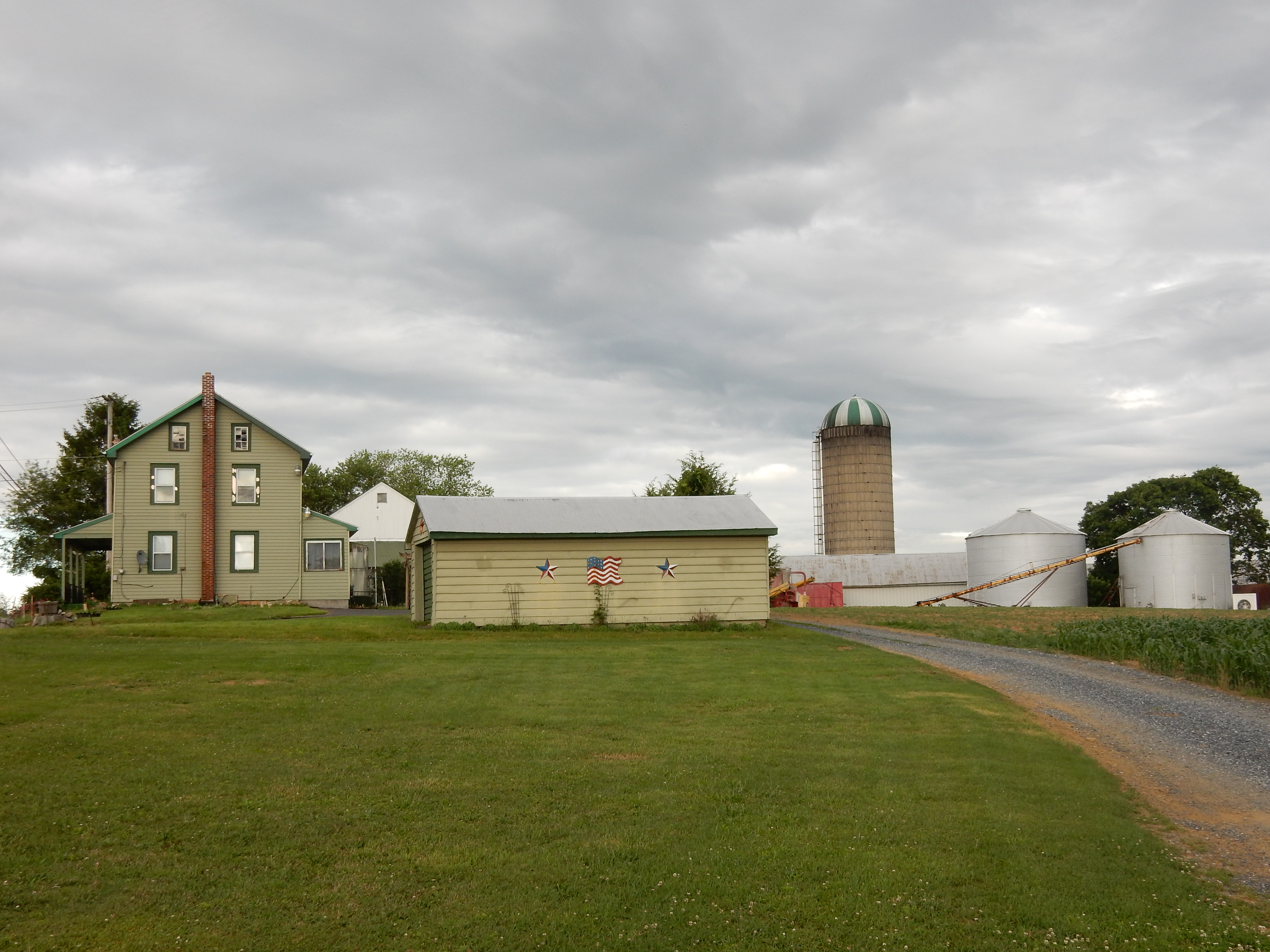
Farm in Upper Bern Township on Olde Route 22.

As of the census of 2000, there were 1,479 people, 556 households, and 419 families living in the township. The population density was 81.0 inhabitants per square mile (31.3/km^{2}). There were 611 housing units at an average density of 33.5 per square mile (12.9/km^{2}). The racial makeup of the township was 97.23% White, 0.47% African American, 0.07% Native American, 0.61% Asian, 0.41% from other races, and 1.22% from two or more races. Hispanic or Latino of any race were 1.22% of the population.

There were 556 households, out of which 32.9% had children under the age of 18 living with them, 63.1% were married couples living together, 6.8% had a female householder with no husband present, and 24.6% were non-families. 18.0% of all households were made up of individuals, and 5.2% had someone living alone who was 65 years of age or older. The average household size was 2.66 and the average family size was 3.02.

Historical population
Census	Pop.	Note	%±
1980	1,159		—
1990	1,458		25.8%
2000	1,479		1.4%
2010	1,734		17.2%
2016 (est.)	1,741		0.4%
Source: US Census Bureau

In the township the population was spread out, with 23.1% under the age of 18, 8.7% from 18 to 24, 33.3% from 25 to 44, 23.9% from 45 to 64, and 11.1% who were 65 years of age or older. The median age was 37 years. For every 100 females, there were 104.6 males. For every 100 females age 18 and over, there were 104.3 males.

The median income for a household in the township was $50,991, and the median income for a family was $55,563. Males had a median income of $32,270 versus $24,688 for females. The per capita income for the township was $20,499. About 2.7% of families and 3.7% of the population were below the poverty line, including 6.9% of those under age 18 and 1.1% of those age 65 or over.

== Recreation ==
Portions of the Pennsylvania State Game Lands Number 110 and the Weiser State Forest are located along the northern border of the township.

== Transportation ==
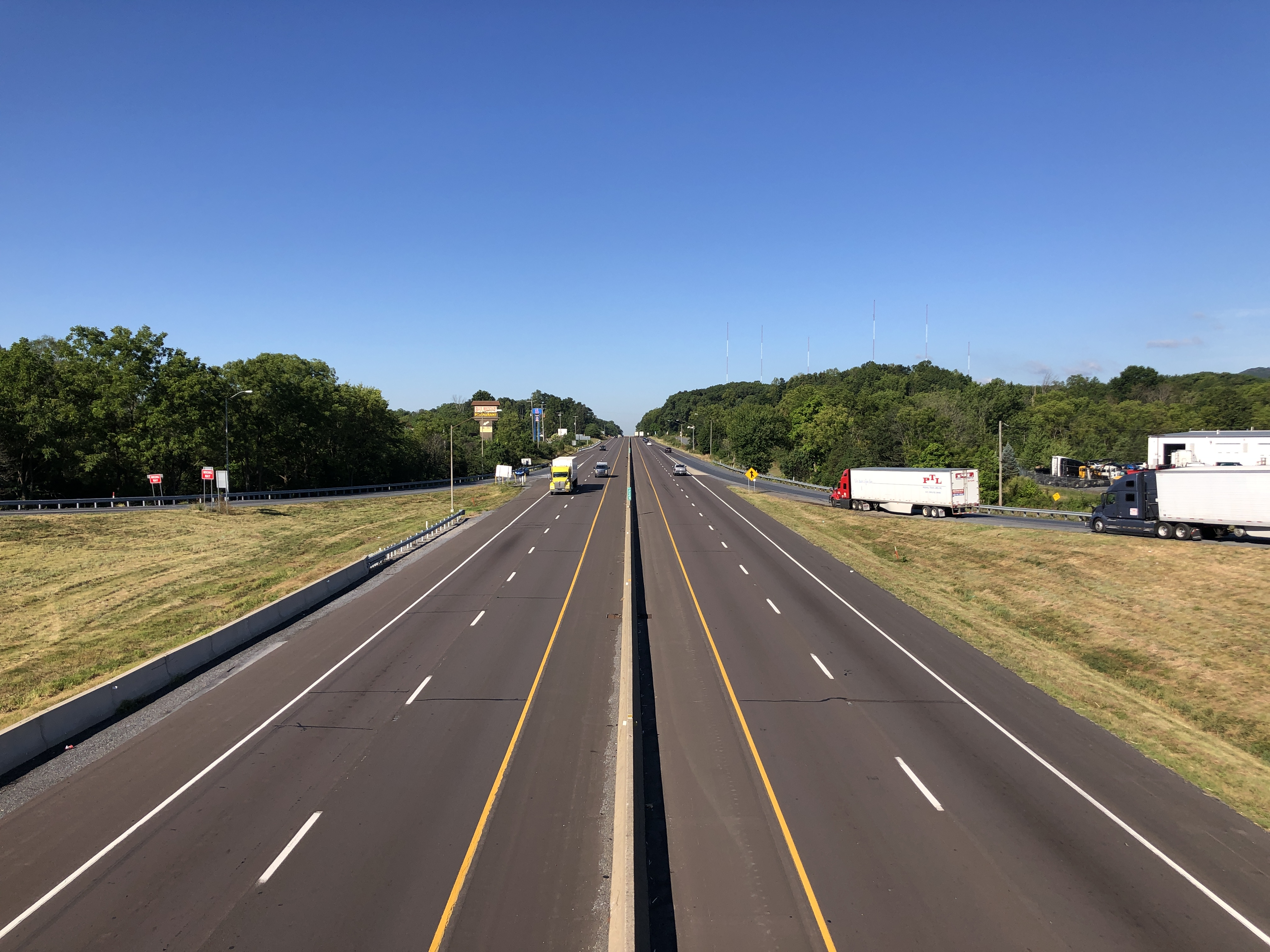
I-78/US 22 westbound in Upper Bern Township

As of 2020, there were 39.66 miles (63.83 km) of public roads in Upper Bern Township, of which 10.70 miles (17.22 km) were maintained by the Pennsylvania Department of Transportation (PennDOT) and 28.96 miles (46.61 km) were maintained by the township.

Interstate 78 and U.S. Route 22 are the only highways serving Upper Bern Township. They follow William Penn Highway concurrently along a southwest–northeast alignment through the middle of the township.
