= Tilden Township, Pennsylvania =

Township in Pennsylvania, US

Tilden Township
- Township
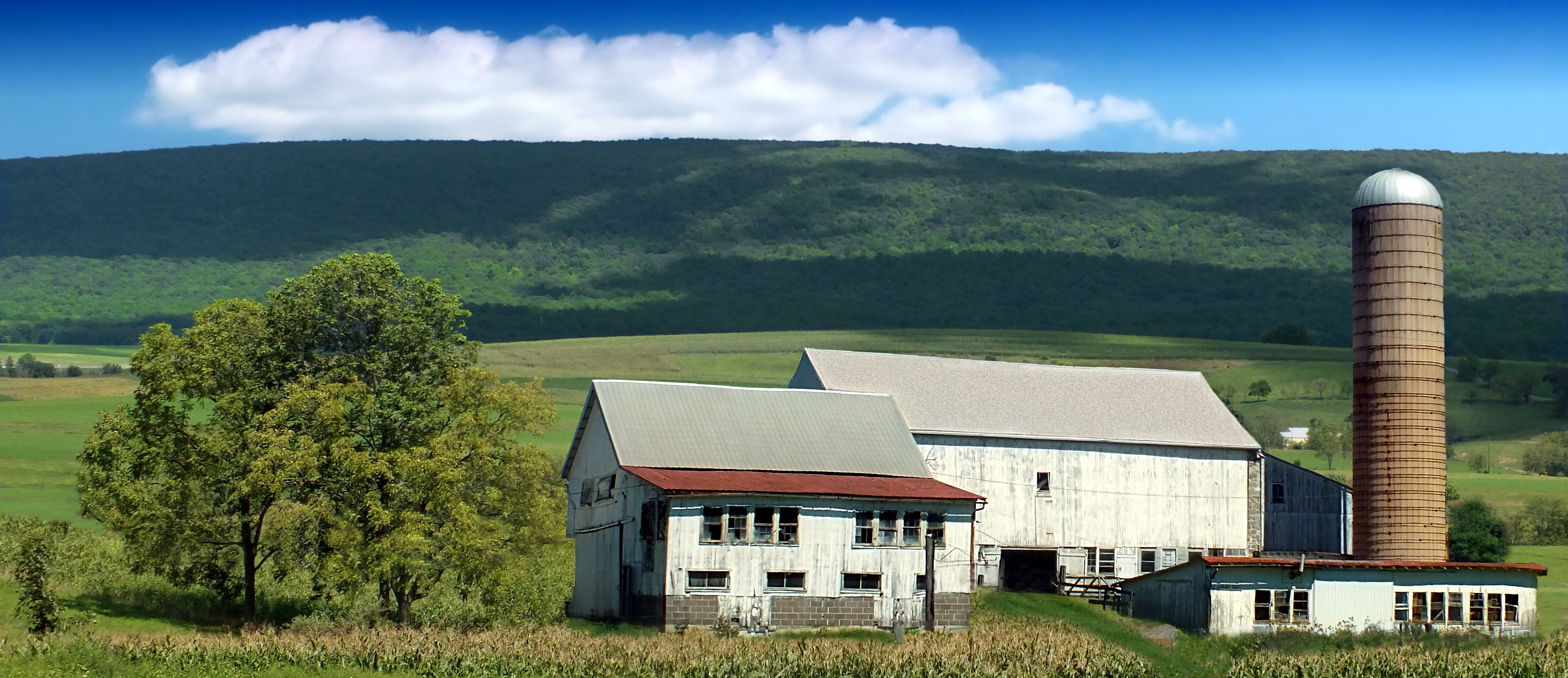
- A farm in the township

- Location of Tilden Township in Pennsylvania Tilden Township (the United States)
- Coordinates: 40°32′30″N 75°59′29″W
- Country: United States
- State: Pennsylvania
- County: Berks

Area
  - Total: 19.0 sq mi (49 km^{2})
  - Land: 18.9 sq mi (49 km^{2})
  - Water: 0.1 sq mi (0.26 km^{2})
- Elevation: 587 ft (179 m)

Population (2010)
  - Total: 3,597
  - Estimate (2016): 3,578
  - Density: 189.3/sq mi (73.1/km^{2})
- Time zone: UTC-5 (EST)
  - Summer (DST): UTC-4 (EDT)
- Area code: 610
- FIPS code: 42-011-76712

Tilden Township is a township in Berks County, Pennsylvania, United States. The population was 3,597 at the 2010 census.

== Geography ==
According to the U.S. Census Bureau, the township has a total area of 19.0 square miles (49.2 km^{2}), of which 18.9 square miles (49.0 km^{2}) is land and 0.1 square mile (0.2 km^{2}) (0.37%) is water. It is drained by the Schuylkill River, which forms its natural eastern and part of its northern natural boundary. Blue Mountain forms the remainder of its natural northern boundary. Tilden's four villages are Berne, Jalappa, Upper Berne, and West Hamburg.

Adjacent townships

- Centre Township (south)
- Upper Bern Township (west)
- South Manheim Township, Schuylkill County (northwest)
- West Brunswick Township, Schuylkill County (north)
- Windsor Township (east)
- Perry Township (southeast)

The boroughs of Hamburg and Port Clinton are both located across the Schuylkill River, while Port Clinton is in Schuylkill County.

== Demographics ==
At the 2010 census, there were 3,597 people, 1,336 households, and 967 families living in the township. The population density was 189.3 inhabitants per square mile (73.1/km^{2}). There were 1,424 housing units at an average density of 75.3 per square mile (29.1/km^{2}). The racial makeup of the township was 96.7% White, 0.8% African American, 0.1% Native American, 0.3% Asian, 1.4% from other races, and 4.0% from two or more races. Hispanic or Latino of any race were 4.0%.

Historical population
Census	Pop.	Note	%±
1980	2,247		—
1990	2,522		12.2%
2000	3,553		40.9%
2010	3,597		1.2%
2016 (est.)	3,578		−0.5%
U.S. Decennial Census

There were 1,336 households, 30.2% had children under the age of 18 living with them, 59.7% were married couples living together, 8.3% had a female householder with no husband present, and 27.6% were non-families. 20.7% of households were made up of individuals, and 7.4% were one person aged 65 or older. The average household size was 2.60 and the average family size was 3.00.

The age distribution was 21.1% under the age of 18, 7.2% from 18 to 24, 22.0% from 25 to 44, 32.5% from 45 to 64, and 16.2% 65 or older. The median age was 44.5 years. For every 100 females, there were 102.1 males. For every 100 females age 18 and over, there were 99.8 males.

The median household income was $49,966 and the median family income was $57,045. Males had a median income of $41,378 versus $25,481 for females. The per capita income for the township was $22,879. About 4.2% of families and 6.0% of the population were below the poverty line, including 4.9% of those under age 18 and 10.6% of those age 65 or over.

== Recreation ==
Portions of the Pennsylvania State Game Lands Number 110, which carries part of the Appalachian National Scenic Trail, are located along the northern border of the township.

== Transportation ==
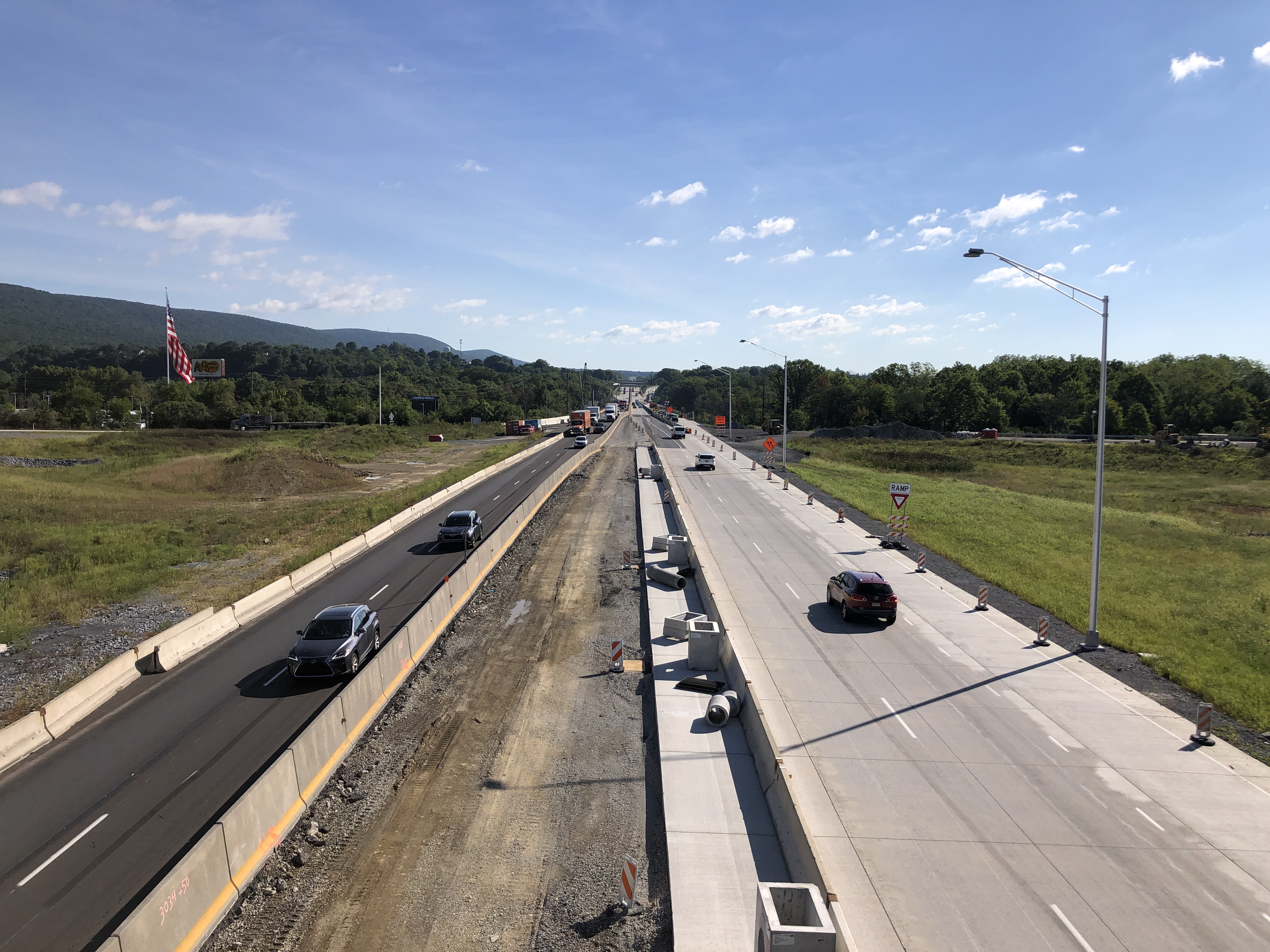
I-78/US 22 eastbound in Tilden Township

As of 2019, there were 59.57 miles (95.87 km) of public roads in Tilden Township, of which 15.87 miles (25.54 km) were maintained by the Pennsylvania Department of Transportation (PennDOT) and 43.70 miles (70.33 km) were maintained by the township.

Interstate 78/U.S. Route 22 and Pennsylvania Route 61 have an interchange in the township, just west of the Schuylkill River. Old Route 22 (Hex Highway) runs east-to-west south of I-78 and does not interchange with PA 61.
