= List of places in Pennsylvania: J–K =

This list of cities, towns, unincorporated communities, counties, and other recognized places in the U.S. state of Pennsylvania also includes information on the number and names of counties in which the place lies, and its lower and upper zip code bounds, if applicable.

Name of place	Number of counties	Principal county	Lower zip code	Upper zip code
J M Junction	1	Indiana County		
Jacks Mountain	1	Adams County	17320	
Jacks Run Dock	1	Allegheny County		
Jackson	1	Erie County		
Jackson	1	Susquehanna County	18825	
Jackson Center	1	Mercer County	16133	
Jackson Center	1	Tioga County		
Jackson Corner	1	Huntingdon County	16652	
Jackson Hall	1	Franklin County	17201	
Jackson Knolls	1	Lawrence County	16101	
Jackson Knolls Gardens	1	Lawrence County		
Jackson Mills	1	Bedford County		
Jackson Summit	1	Tioga County	16936	
Jackson Township	1	Butler County		
Jackson Township	1	Cambria County		
Jackson Township	1	Columbia County		
Jackson Township	1	Dauphin County		
Jackson Township	1	Greene County		
Jackson Township	1	Huntingdon County		
Jackson Township	1	Lebanon County		
Jackson Township	1	Luzerne County		
Jackson Township	1	Lycoming County		
Jackson Township	1	Mercer County		
Jackson Township	1	Monroe County		
Jackson Township	1	Northumberland County		
Jackson Township	1	Perry County		
Jackson Township	1	Snyder County		
Jackson Township	1	Susquehanna County		
Jackson Township	1	Tioga County		
Jackson Township	1	Venango County		
Jackson Township	1	York County		
Jacksonville	1	Bucks County		
Jacksonville	1	Centre County	16841	
Jacksonville	1	Indiana County	15752	
Jacksonville	1	Lancaster County		
Jacksonville	1	Lehigh County	19529	
Jacksonville	1	Northampton County	18014	
Jacksonville Mine Junction	1	Indiana County		
Jacksonwald	1	Berks County	19606	
Jacksville	1	Butler County	16057	
Jacktown	1	Westmoreland County	15642	
Jacobs Creek	1	Westmoreland County	15448	
Jacobs Mills	1	York County	17331	
Jacobus	1	York County	17407	
Jalappa	1	Berks County	19526	
James City	1	Elk County	16734	
James Creek	1	Huntingdon County	16657	
James Manor	1	Bucks County	18901	
Jamestown	1	Cambria County	15946	
Jamestown	1	Carbon County	18235	
Jamestown	1	Mercer County	16134	
Jamesville	1	Northampton County	18014	
Jamison	1	Bucks County	18929	
Jamison	1	Fayette County	15401	
Jamison	1	Forest County		
Jamison City	1	Columbia County	17814	
Jamisonville	1	Butler County		
Janesville	1	Clearfield County		
Japan	1	Luzerne County	18224	
Jarrettown	1	Montgomery County	19025	
Jay Township	1	Elk County		
Jeanesville	1	Luzerne County	18201	
Jeannette	1	Westmoreland County	15644	
Jeansville	1	Luzerne County	18201	
Jeddo	1	Luzerne County	18224	
Jednota	1	Dauphin County	17057	
Jefferis	1	Fayette County		
Jefferis Crossing	1	Fayette County	15401	
Jefferson	1	Allegheny County	15025	
Jefferson	1	Clarion County		
Jefferson	1	Greene County	15344	
Jefferson	1	Schuylkill County	17922	
Jefferson	1	Washington County	15312	
Jefferson	1	York County	17311	
Jefferson Center	1	Butler County	16001	
Jefferson Hills	1	Allegheny County	15025	
Jefferson Junction	1	Susquehanna County		
Jefferson Township	1	Berks County		
Jefferson Township	1	Butler County		
Jefferson Township	1	Dauphin County		
Jefferson Township	1	Fayette County		
Jefferson Township	1	Greene County		
Jefferson Township	1	Lackawanna County		
Jefferson Township	1	Mercer County		
Jefferson Township	1	Somerset County		
Jefferson Township	1	Washington County		
Jeffersonville	1	Montgomery County	19401	
Jenkins Junction	1	Luzerne County		
Jenkins Township	1	Luzerne County		
Jenkintown	1	Montgomery County	19046	
Jenks	1	Wyoming County		
Jenks Township	1	Forest County		
Jenner Township	1	Somerset County		
Jenners	1	Somerset County	15546	
Jennerstown	1	Somerset County	15547	
Jennersville	1	Chester County	19390	
Jenningsville	1	Wyoming County	18629	
Jericho	1	Cameron County	15681	
Jericho	1	Wayne County		
Jericho Mills	1	Juniata County	17059	
Jericho Valley	1	Bucks County	18938	
Jermyn	1	Lackawanna County	18433	
Jerome	1	Somerset County	15937	
Jerome Junction	1	Somerset County	15935	
Jersey Mills	1	Lycoming County	17739	
Jersey Shore	1	Lycoming County	17723	
Jerseytown	1	Columbia County	17815	
Jessup	1	Lackawanna County	18434	
Jessup Township	1	Susquehanna County		
Jewell	1	Allegheny County	15102	
Jewtown	1	Indiana County	15745	
Jim Thorpe	1	Carbon County	18229	
Jimtown	1	Somerset County		
Jo Jo	1	McKean County	16735	
Joanna	1	Berks County	19520	
Joanna Heights	1	Berks County		
Jobs Corners	1	Tioga County	16936	
Joffre	1	Washington County	15053	
John Wanamaker	1	Philadelphia County	19107	
Johnsburg	1	Somerset County		
Johnson Greene	1	Luzerne County	18651	
Johnsonburg	1	Elk County	15845	
Johnsons Corner	1	Delaware County	19317	
Johnsons Mill	1	Fulton County		
Johnsonville	1	Northampton County		
Johnston	1	Franklin County		
Johnstown	1	Cambria County	15901	45
Johnstown	1	Lebanon County		
Johnstown	1	Union County	17844	
Johnstown Flood National Memorial	1	Cambria County	16630	
Johnsville	1	Bucks County	18974	
Joliett	1	Schuylkill County	17981	
Joller	1	Huntingdon County	16674	
Jollytown	1	Greene County	16229	
Jonas	1	Monroe County	18058	
Jones Mills	1	Westmoreland County	15646	
Jones Terrace	1	Northampton County	18042	
Jones Township	1	Elk County		
Jonestown	1	Columbia County	17859	
Jonestown	1	Lebanon County	17038	
Jonestown	1	Schuylkill County	17901	
Jonestown	1	Washington County	15022	
Jonesville	1	Carbon County		
Jordan	1	Lehigh County	18053	
Jordan Hollow	1	Lackawanna County		
Jordan Township	1	Clearfield County		
Jordan Township	1	Lycoming County		
Jordan Township	1	Northumberland County		
Jordan Valley	1	Lehigh County	18053	
Josephine	1	Indiana County	15750	
Josephtown	1	Beaver County		
Joyce	1	Lawrence County		
Jubilee	1	Lackawanna County		
Jugtown	1	Blair County	16662	
Jugtown	1	Bucks County		
Jugtown	1	Franklin County	17268	
Julian	1	Centre County	16844	
Jumonville	1	Fayette County	15445	
June Meadows	1	Montgomery County	19006	
Juneau	1	Indiana County	15751	
Junedale	1	Carbon County	18230	
Junewood	1	Bucks County		
Juniata	1	Blair County	16601	
Juniata	1	Fayette County	15431	
Juniata	1	Philadelphia County		
Juniata Furnace	1	Perry County		
Juniata Gap	1	Blair County	16601	
Juniata Terrace	1	Mifflin County	17044	
Juniata Township	1	Bedford County		
Juniata Township	1	Blair County		
Juniata Township	1	Huntingdon County		
Juniata Township	1	Perry County		
Juniper Circle	1	Lehigh County		
Justus	1	Lackawanna County	18411	
Kahle Siding	1	Clarion County		
Kahletown	1	Jefferson County		
Kaiserville	1	Wyoming County	18630	
Kammerer	1	Washington County	15330	
Kane	1	McKean County	16735	
Kanesholm	1	McKean County	16735	
Kaneville	1	Venango County	16301	
Kantner	1	Somerset County	15548	
Kanty	1	Erie County		
Kantz	1	Snyder County	17870	
Kantz Corners	1	Crawford County		
Kaolin	1	Chester County	19374	
Kapp	1	Northumberland County		
Kapp Heights	1	Northumberland County	17857	
Karen	1	Washington County	15417	
Karns	1	Allegheny County	15065	
Karns City	1	Butler County	16041	
Karthaus	1	Clearfield County	16845	
Karthaus Township	1	Clearfield County		
Kaseville	1	Montour County	17821	
Kashner	1	Mercer County		
Kasiesville	1	Franklin County	17236	
Kaska	1	Schuylkill County	17959	
Kasson	1	McKean County	16749	
Kasson Brook	1	Wyoming County		
Katellen	1	Northampton County		
Kato	1	Centre County		
Kauffman	1	Franklin County	17201	
Kaufmann	1	Fayette County		
Kaulmont	1	Elk County		
Kaylor	1	Armstrong County	16042	
Kaylor	1	Cambria County		
Kaywin	1	Lehigh County	18018	
Kaywin	1	Northampton County	18018	
Kaywood	1	Centre County		
Keal Run	1	Indiana County		
Kearney	1	Bedford County	16679	
Kearsarge	1	Erie County	16509	
Keating	1	Clinton County	17778	
Keating Junction	1	Clinton County	17778	
Keating Summit	1	Potter County	16749	
Keating Township	1	McKean County		
Keating Township	1	Potter County		
Keborts Corners	1	Crawford County		
Kecksburg	1	Westmoreland County	15666	
Kedron Park	1	Delaware County	19070	
Keech	1	Potter County	16923	
Keefers	1	Northumberland County		
Keelersburg	1	Wyoming County		
Keelersville	1	Bucks County	18944	
Keenan	1	Butler County		
Keeney	1	York County		
Keeneyville	1	Tioga County	16935	
Keeny Row	1	Fayette County		
Keepville	1	Erie County	16401	
Keewaydin	1	Clearfield County	16836	
Keffer	1	Schuylkill County	17891	
Keffer	1	Westmoreland County	15658	
Kegg	1	Bedford County		
Kehler	1	Schuylkill County		
Kehley Run Junction	1	Schuylkill County	17976	
Keifertown	1	Fayette County	15683	
Keiser	1	Northumberland County		
Keisters	1	Butler County	16057	
Keisterville	1	Fayette County	15449	
Kelayres	1	Schuylkill County	18231	
Kellers Church	1	Bucks County	18944	
Kellers Mill	1	Indiana County		
Kellersburg	1	Armstrong County	16237	
Kellersville	1	Monroe County	18360	
Kellerville	1	Juniata County		
Kellettville	1	Forest County	16353	
Kelley	1	Allegheny County		
Kelley	1	Armstrong County		
Kellogg	1	Bradford County		
Kelly	1	Armstrong County	16226	
Kelly Crossroads	1	Union County	17837	
Kelly Point	1	Union County	17837	
Kelly Township	1	Union County		
Kellyburg	1	Lycoming County		
Kellysburg	1	Indiana County		
Kellytown	1	Clearfield County	16863	
Kellytown	1	Tioga County	16933	
Kellyville	1	Delaware County	19026	
Kelton	1	Chester County	19346	
Kemblesville	1	Chester County	19347	
Kemmererville	1	Monroe County	18360	
Kempton	1	Berks County	19529	
Kempville	1	Berks County		
Kendall	1	Beaver County	15043	
Kendall Creek	1	McKean County	16701	
Kendigtown	1	Bucks County		
Kendrick	1	Clearfield County	16651	
Kenhorst	1	Berks County	19607	
Kenilworth	1	Chester County	19464	
Kenmar	1	Lycoming County	17705	
Kenmawr	1	Allegheny County	15136	
Kennard	1	Mercer County	16125	
Kennedy	1	Tioga County	16901	
Kennedy Mill	1	Lawrence County	16051	
Kennedy Township	1	Allegheny County		
Kennells Mill	1	Somerset County		
Kennerdell	1	Venango County	16374	
Kenneth	1	Fayette County		
Kennett Square	1	Chester County	19348	
Kennett Township	1	Chester County		
Kenny	1	Allegheny County	15122	
Kenny Row	1	Fayette County	15468	
Kennywood	1	Allegheny County	15122	
Kenrock	1	Huntingdon County		
Kensington	1	Philadelphia County	19125	
Kent	1	Indiana County	15752	
Kenwick Village	1	Lancaster County	17601	
Kenwood	1	Bucks County		
Kenwood	1	Indiana County	15728	
Keown	1	Allegheny County	15237	
Keown Station	1	Allegheny County		
Keplers	1	Northampton County		
Keplers Mill	1	Northampton County		
Kepner	1	Schuylkill County	17960	
Kepple Hill	1	Armstrong County	15690	
Kepples	1	Butler County		
Kepples Corner	1	Butler County	16025	
Kernsville	1	Lehigh County	18069	
Kernville	1	Cambria County		
Kerr	1	Armstrong County		
Kerr	1	Clearfield County	15055	
Kerrmoor	1	Clearfield County	16833	
Kerrs Corners	1	Erie County		
Kerrs Corners	1	Mercer County		
Kerrsville	1	Cumberland County	17013	
Kerrtown	1	Crawford County	16335	
Kersey	1	Elk County	15846	
Kesslerville	1	Northampton County	18064	
Ketcham	1	Luzerne County	18612	
Ketner	1	Elk County		
Keys	1	York County	17322	
Keyser Valley	1	Lackawanna County		
Keystone	1	Elk County	15823	
Keystone	1	Luzerne County	18702	
Keystone	1	Perry County		
Keystone	1	Somerset County	15552	
Keystone	1	Westmoreland County	15637	
Khedive	1	Greene County	15320	
Kibbeville	1	Potter County		
Kidder Township	1	Carbon County		
Kidders Corner	1	Erie County		
Kilbuck Township	1	Allegheny County		
Kilgore	1	Mercer County	16153	
Killinger	1	Dauphin County	17061	
Kim Plan	1	Westmoreland County	15642	
Kimberton	1	Chester County	19442	
Kimble Corners	1	Erie County		
Kimbles	1	Pike County	18428	
Kimmel	1	Huntingdon County		
Kimmel	1	Indiana County		
Kimmel	1	Somerset County		
Kimmel Township	1	Bedford County		
Kimmelton	1	Somerset County	15563	
Kinderhook	1	Lancaster County	17512	
Kindts Corner	1	Berks County	19555	
King	1	Bedford County	16655	
King of Prussia	1	Montgomery County	19406	
King Township	1	Bedford County		
Kings Manor	1	Montgomery County	19406	
Kingsdale	1	Adams County	17340	
Kingsessing	1	Philadelphia County	19143	
Kingsley	1	Susquehanna County	18826	
Kingsley Township	1	Forest County		
Kingston	1	Luzerne County	18704	
Kingston	1	Westmoreland County	15650	
Kingston Township	1	Luzerne County		
Kingsville	1	Clarion County	15864	
Kingswood Estates	1	Monroe County		
Kingswood Park	1	Bucks County	19007	
Kingview	1	Fayette County	15683	
Kingwood	1	Somerset County	15551	
Kinkora Heights	1	Perry County	17020	
Kinlock	1	Westmoreland County	15069	
Kinney	1	Potter County	16923	
Kinport	1	Cambria County	15724	
Kinter	1	Indiana County		
Kintersburg	1	Indiana County		
Kintnersville	1	Bucks County	18930	
Kinzers	1	Lancaster County	17535	
Kinzua Beach	1	Warren County		
Kinzua Heights	1	Warren County		
Kinzua Township	1	Warren County		
Kipps Run	1	Northumberland County		
Kirby	1	Greene County	15370	
Kirbyville	1	Berks County		
Kirchberg	1	Northampton County		
Kirkland	1	Chester County		
Kirklyn	1	Delaware County	19082	
Kirks Mills	1	Lancaster County	19362	
Kirkwood	1	Lancaster County	17536	
Kirwan Heights	1	Allegheny County	15017	
Kishacoquillas	1	Mifflin County		
Kiskimere	1	Armstrong County	15690	
Kiskiminetas Junction	1	Westmoreland County		
Kiskiminetas Township	1	Armstrong County		
Kis-Lyn	1	Luzerne County	18222	
Kissel Hill	1	Lancaster County	17543	
Kissimmee	1	Snyder County	17842	
Kissingers Mill	1	Clarion County	16248	
Kistler	1	Mifflin County	17066	
Kistler	1	Perry County	17047	
Kitches Corners	1	Mercer County	16125	
Kittanning	1	Armstrong County	16201	
Kittanning Township	1	Armstrong County		
Kittatinny	1	Carbon County		
Klahr	1	Blair County	16625	
Klapperthall Junction	1	Berks County		
Klecknersville	1	Northampton County	18014	
Kleinfeltersville	1	Lebanon County	17039	
Kleinville	1	Montgomery County		
Kline	1	Clarion County		
Kline Township	1	Schuylkill County		
Kline Village	1	Dauphin County	17104	
Klines Corner	1	Berks County	19539	
Klines Grove	1	Northumberland County	17801	
Klines Mill	1	Somerset County		
Klinesville	1	Berks County	19534	
Klinesville	1	Lancaster County	17512	
Klingerstown	1	Schuylkill County	17941	
Klondike	1	McKean County	16738	
Klondike	1	Westmoreland County		
Klondyke	1	Mifflin County	17044	
Knapp	1	Tioga County	16901	
Knauers	1	Berks County	19540	
Knauertown	1	Chester County	19464	
Kneass	1	Northumberland County		
Knechts	1	Northampton County		
Kneedler	1	Montgomery County		
Knepper	1	Franklin County	17268	
Knightsbridge	1	Allegheny County	15205	
Knightsville	1	Huntingdon County	17052	
Knob	1	Beaver County		
Knobsville	1	Fulton County	17233	
Knobville	1	Mifflin County		
Knoebels	1	Northumberland County	17824	
Knousetown	1	Juniata County	17062	
Knowlton	1	Potter County		
Knowltonwood	1	Delaware County	19065	
Knox	1	Beaver County	16117	
Knox	1	Clarion County	16232	
Knox Dale	1	Jefferson County	15847	
Knox Run	1	Clearfield County	19068	
Knox Township	1	Clarion County		
Knox Township	1	Clearfield County		
Knox Township	1	Jefferson County		
Knoxdale	1	Jefferson County		
Knoxlyn	1	Adams County	17325	
Knoxville	1	Allegheny County		
Knoxville	1	Fayette County	15417	
Knoxville	1	Tioga County	16928	
K.O. Junction	1	Mercer County		
Kobuta	1	Beaver County		
Kohinoor Junction	1	Schuylkill County	17976	
Koonsville	1	Luzerne County	18655	
Koontzville	1	Bedford County		
Koppel	1	Beaver County	16136	
Korn Krest	1	Luzerne County	18702	
Kossuth	1	Clarion County	16331	
Kraft Mill	1	York County		
Kralltown	1	York County	17316	
Krassdale	1	Lehigh County		
Kratz	1	Montgomery County		
Kratzerville	1	Snyder County	17870	
Krause	1	Juniata County		
Kraussdale	1	Lehigh County	18041	
Krayn	1	Cambria County	15963	
Kreamer	1	Snyder County	17833	
Krebs	1	Clearfield County		
Krebs	1	Schuylkill County		
Kregar	1	Westmoreland County	15622	
Kreidersville	1	Northampton County	18067	
Kremis	1	Mercer County	16125	
Kresgeville	1	Monroe County	18333	
Kreutz Creek	1	York County	17406	
Kricks Mill	1	Berks County		
Kricktown	1	Berks County	19608	
Krings	2	Cambria County	15904	
Krings	2	Somerset County	15904	
Krocksville	1	Lehigh County	18104	
Krumrine	1	Centre County	16801	
Krumsville	1	Berks County	19534	
Kuhl	1	Erie County		
Kuhnsville	1	Lehigh County	18103	
Kuhntown	1	Greene County	15354	
Kulp	1	Columbia County	17820	
Kulpmont	1	Northumberland County	17834	
Kulps	1	Northumberland County		
Kulps Corner	1	Bucks County	18944	
Kulpsville	1	Montgomery County	19443	
Kulptown	1	Berks County	19518	
Kunkle	1	Luzerne County	18612	
Kunkletown	1	Monroe County	18058	
Kushequa	1	McKean County	16735	
Kutztown	1	Berks County	19530	
Kylers Corner	1	Elk County	15846	
Kylertown	1	Clearfield County	16847	
Kyleville	1	York County	17302	
Kyttle	1	Luzerne County		
