= Dragon Cave =

Cave in Pennsylvania, United States

- Interactive map of Dragon Cave
- Location: Richmond Township, Pennsylvania, United States
- Coordinates: 40.520833°N 75.859722°W
- Length: 460 feet
- Discovery: 1770
- Geology: Limestone, Karst, Ordovician
- Entrances: 1
- Access: Private

Dragon Cave is a limestone cave located in Richmond Township, Berks County, Pennsylvania on the Joel Dreibelbis farm. It is part of the Martinsburg formation of Ordovician age that includes the Crystal, Schofer, Dreibelbis, and Onyx caves. The entrance is located on private property, ungated, but is not open to recreational caving.

== Geology ==
The Dragon Cave is in a limestone lens in the Martinsburg shale formation of Ordovician age. This limestone belt extends roughly 5 miles in a straight line and includes the Crystal, Schofer, Dreibelbis, and Onyx caves. It has the only natural entrance in the area, made out of weathered yellow shale, and is located at an elevation of 400 feet. A 20 ft. by 15 ft. sinkhole drops to the 9 ft. wide cave entrance that leads to a V-shaped cave pattern.

== History ==
On April 4, 1770, James Nevil printed a map for William Scull, a surveyor for Pennsylvania, that had a spot marked "cave" about 12 miles north of Reading. This is believed to be Dragon Cave and is the oldest known written cave reference in the United States. Subsequent maps locate the "cavern", as it was later marked, as being east of Maiden Creek, in the area of Richmond, but there was no accompanying description or literature that described the cave or why it was noted.

Ralph W. Stone, a state geologist and speleologist, reported in his 1930, 1932, and 1953 editions of Pennsylvania Caves that the cave on Scull's survey map was actually Durham Cave. However, Durham Cave is located in Bucks County along the Delaware river about 80 miles East of Virginville. It is also an insignificant cave aside from a large archeological bone discovery made in 1865 by H.D. Rogers and again in 1893 when more discoveries were recorded by Henry C. Mercer. Therefore, in 1770 Durham Cave was located a significant distance from where Scull located his cave and had no significance, making it unlikely it was the feature that was given this consideration.

=== The legend ===
Although there are many variations in how the cave got its name, the most often cited is the legend of a Native American love story. Towkee, a Native American Brave or warrior, was in love with Oneeda and in order to propose to her, Towkee had to hunt and kill a deer. After finding and killing a deer at the foot of Blue Mountain, Towkee carried the carcass along the Ontelaunee Creek (Maiden Creek) and to his mother. His mother then butchered and presented the venison to Oneeda's mother. That night, Oneeda's family discussed Towkee's marriage proposal in their wigwam, and the next morning Oneeda's mother gave the final answer of "no."

Heartbroken, Towkee and Oneeda decided that if they could not live together then they would die together. They told their friends to watch for a flaming dragon flying in the sky and that where the dragon landed, their bodies would be found. The dragon made it flight and landed at the mouth of a cave near Virginville, thus Dragon Cave. Their remains were found in a portion of the cave known as The Temple of the Dragon.
