= Kirbyville =

Kirbyville may refer to:

- Kirbyville, Texas
- Kirbyville, Missouri
- Kirbyville, Pennsylvania
