= Kishacoquillas =

Kishacoquillas may refer to:

In Pennsylvania:

- Kishacoquillas, Pennsylvania, an unincorporated community
- Kishacoquillas Creek, a tributary of the Juniata River
- Kishacoquillas Valley, located in Mifflin and Huntingdon Counties
