= Gazzam Run =

Coordinates: 40.87390°N 78.57366°W

Gazzam Run is a 3.5-mile-long (5.6 km) tributary of Little Clearfield Creek in Clearfield County, Pennsylvania in the United States.

Via Little Clearfield Creek, Clearfield Creek, and the West Branch Susquehanna River, it is part of the Susquehanna River watershed, flowing to Chesapeake Bay.

Gazzam Run joins Little Clearfield Creek near the community of Kerrmoor.

It is named after the former mining town of Gazzam which stood on its banks, which was named after Joseph M. Gazzam, a state senator and an incorporator of the Beech Creek Railroad which served the town.

== See also ==
- List of rivers of Pennsylvania
