= Gilmore Township, Greene County, Pennsylvania =

Township in Pennsylvania, US

Coordinates: 39°44′00″N 80°19′59″W

- Township
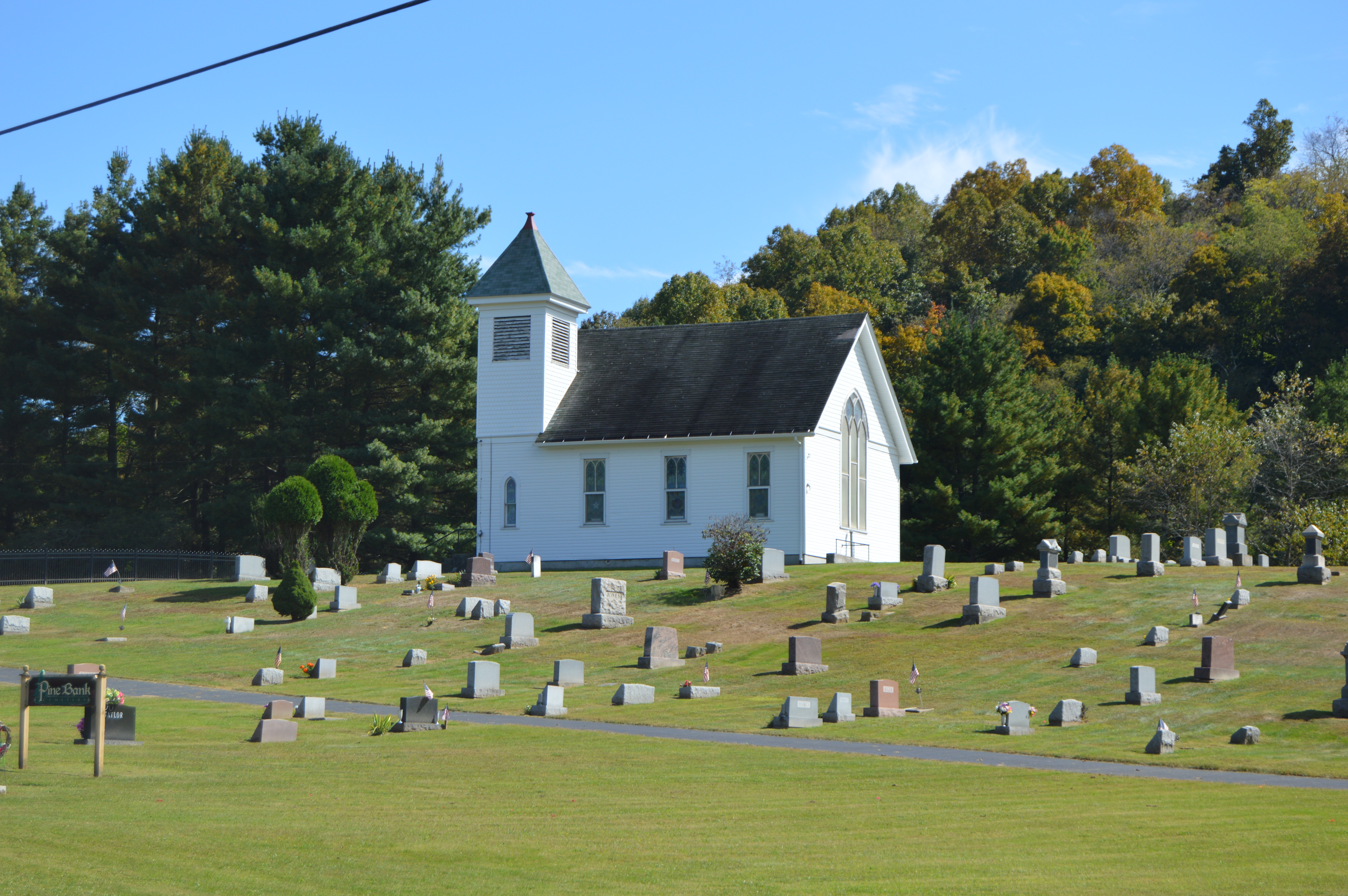
- Pine Bank Methodist Church on Toms Run Road

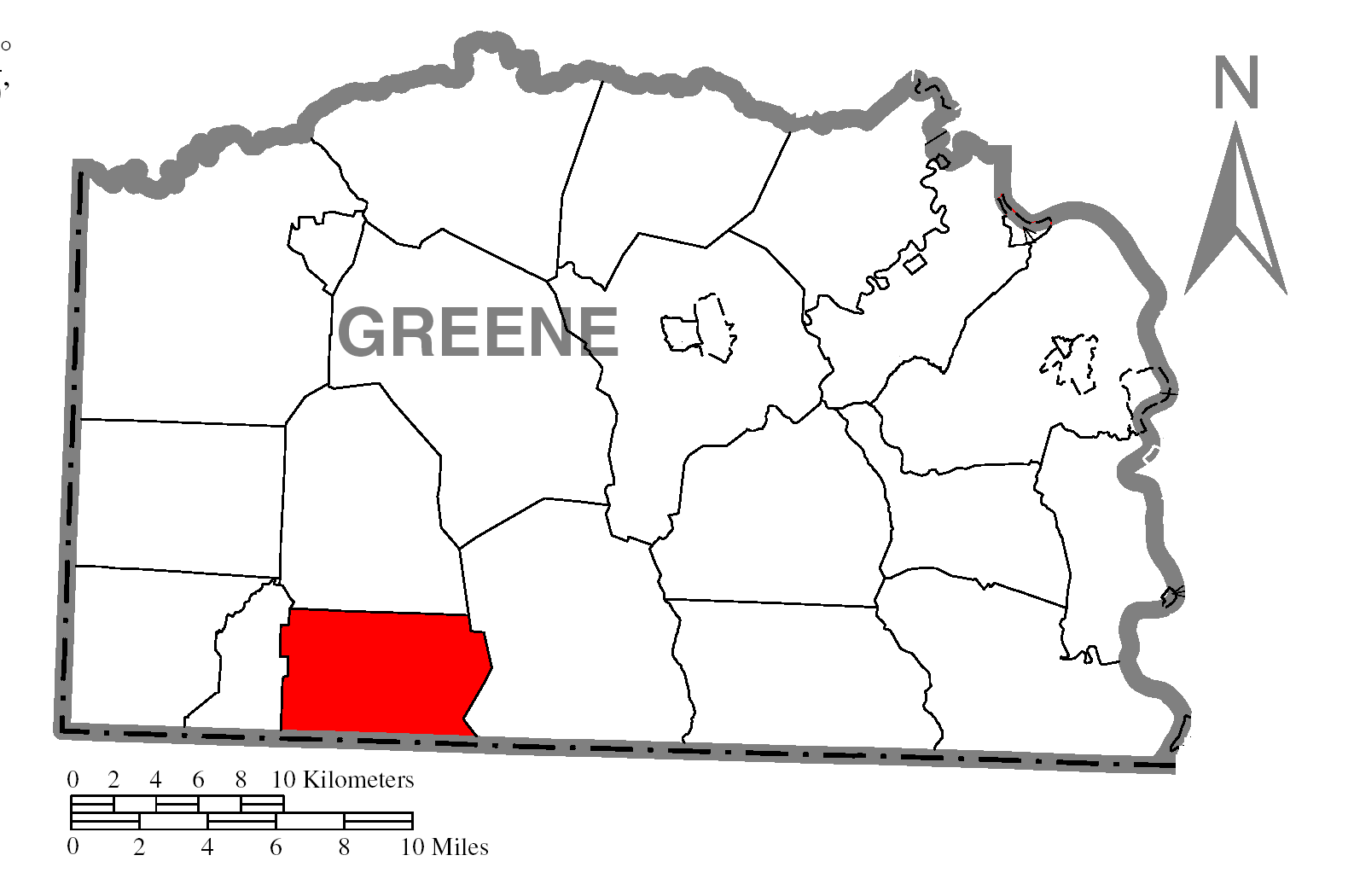
- Location of Gilmore Township in Greene County

- Location of Greene County in Pennsylvania
- Country: United States
- State: Pennsylvania
- County: Greene

Area
  - Total: 23.03 sq mi (59.66 km^{2})
  - Land: 23.03 sq mi (59.66 km^{2})
  - Water: 0 sq mi (0.00 km^{2})

Population (2020)
  - Total: 238 ▼
  - Estimate (2023): 226
  - Density: 10.5/sq mi (4.04/km^{2})
- Time zone: UTC-4 (EST)
  - Summer (DST): UTC-5 (EDT)
- Area code: 724
- FIPS code: 42-059-29152

Gilmore Township is a township in Greene County, Pennsylvania, United States. The population was 238 at the 2020 census, down from 260 at the 2010 census.

== Geography ==
The township is in southwestern Greene County and is bordered to the south by the state of West Virginia. According to the United States Census Bureau, the township has a total area of 23.1 square miles (59.7 km^{2}), all land. The township is drained primarily by Dunkard Creek, an eastward-flowing tributary of the Monongahela River. The northwestern corner of the township is drained by tributaries of the Pennsylvania Fork of Fish Creek, a westward-flowing tributary of the Ohio River.

Unincorporated communities in Gilmore Township include Ashtree, Triumph, Sandrock, Hero, Jollytown, and Pine Bank.

== Demographics ==
Historical population
Census	Pop.	Note	%±
2000	295		—
2010	260		−11.9%
2020	238		−8.5%
2025 (est.)	223		−6.3%
U.S. Decennial Census

As of the census of 2000, there were 295 people, 114 households, and 79 families residing in the township. The population density was 13.6 people per square mile (5.3/km^{2}). There were 153 housing units at an average density of 7.1/sq mi (2.7/km^{2}). The racial makeup of the township was 99.66% White, and 0.34% from two or more races.

There were 114 households, out of which 35.1% had children under the age of 18 living with them, 62.3% were married couples living together, 5.3% had a female householder with no husband present, and 30.7% were non-families. 28.1% of all households were made up of individuals, and 14.0% had someone living alone who was 65 years of age or older. The average household size was 2.59 and the average family size was 3.16.

In the township the population was spread out, with 28.1% under the age of 18, 7.5% from 18 to 24, 27.1% from 25 to 44, 25.8% from 45 to 64, and 11.5% who were 65 years of age or older. The median age was 36 years. For every 100 females, there were 103.4 males. For every 100 females age 18 and over, there were 92.7 males.

The median income for a household in the township was $35,208, and the median income for a family was $46,250. Males had a median income of $41,458 versus $26,250 for females. The per capita income for the township was $16,325. About 7.8% of families and 14.8% of the population were below the poverty line, including 19.1% of those under the age of 18 and 11.8% of those 65 or over.

== Notable people ==
- Maud Wilde (1880-1965), physician, organizational founder, and author
