= Moselem, Pennsylvania =

- Unincorporated community
- Location within Pennsylvania
- Coordinates: 40°30′2″N 75°53′3″W
- Country: United States
- State: Pennsylvania
- County: Berks
- Township: Richmond
- Elevation: 338 ft (103 m)
- Time zone: UTC-5 (Eastern (EST))
  - Summer (DST): UTC-4 (EDT)
- Area codes: 610 and 484
- GNIS feature ID: 1181601

Moselem is an unincorporated community in Richmond Township in Berks County, Pennsylvania, United States. Moselem is located along Pennsylvania Route 662, east of Maiden Creek.

== History ==
A post office called Moselem was established in 1846, and remained in operation until 1907. Moselem is a name derived from a Native American language purported to mean "trout stream".
