= Merkel Mill Complex =

- U.S. National Register of Historic Places
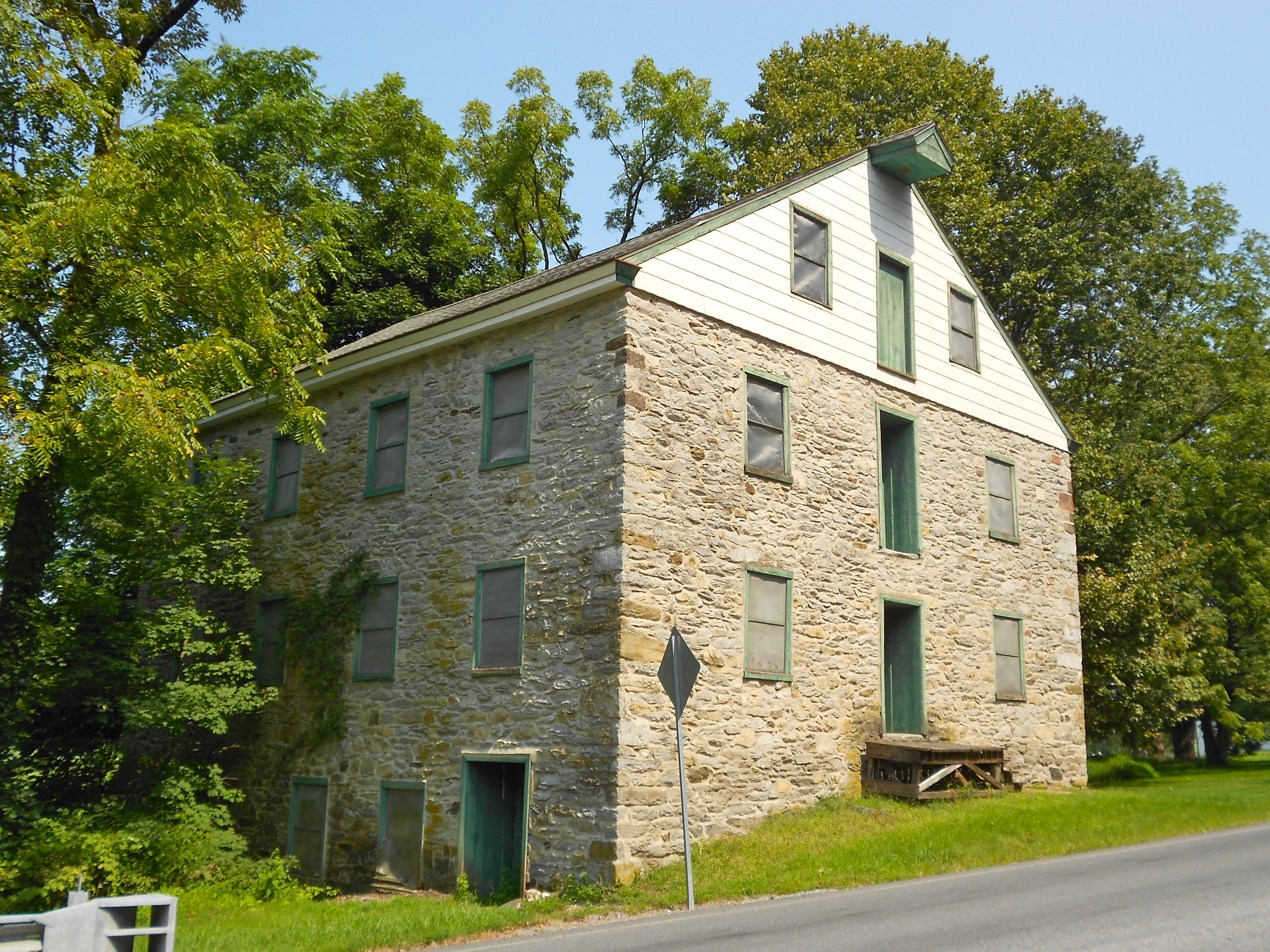

- Location within Pennsylvania Location within the United States
- Location: Junction of Pennsylvania Routes 662 and 143 near Moselem Springs, Richmond Township, Pennsylvania
- Coordinates: 40°30′02″N 75°51′03″W
- Area: 12 acres (4.9 ha)
- Built: 1854
- MPS: Gristmills in Berks County MPS
- NRHP reference No.: 90001626
- Added to NRHP: November 8, 1990

The Merkel Mill Complex is an historic grist mill complex in Richmond Township, Berks County, Pennsylvania, United States.

It was listed on the National Register of Historic Places in 1990.

== History and architectural features ==
This complex consists of a 2 1/2-story, stone banked mill with tin roof (1854), a 2 1/2-story, stone Georgian-style manor house (1767), a large stone and frame barn with banked earth ramp (c. 1850), a one-story smokehouse with slate roof (c. 1767), a 1 1/2-story stone summer kitchen (c. 1767), a clapboarded, frame privy (c. 1939), a storage shed (c. 1939), and the millraces, dam, and pond. The mill, which ceased operation circa 1939, was built as part of a working farm.
