= Christian Schlegel Farm =

- U.S. National Register of Historic Places
- U.S. Historic district
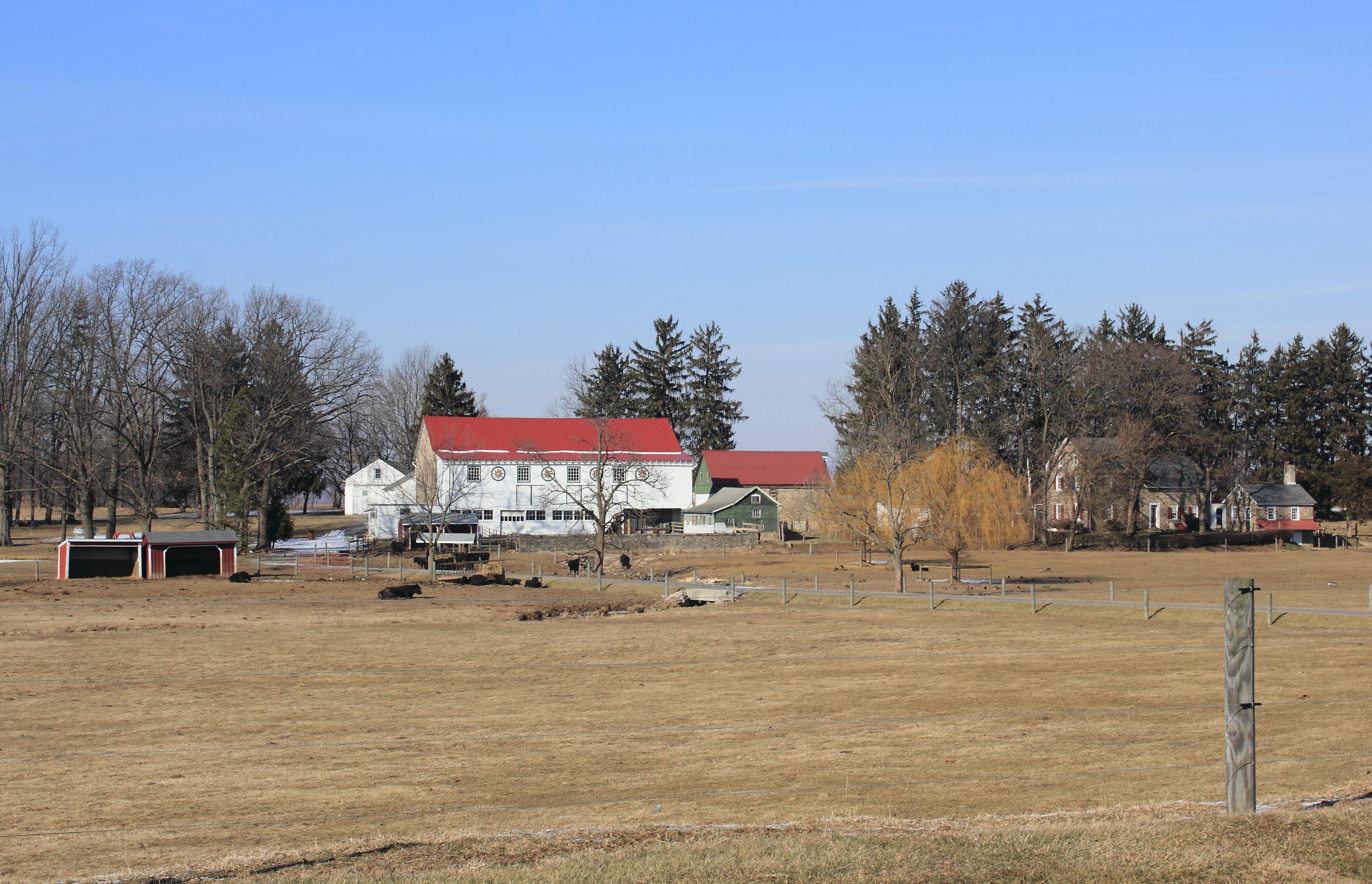

- Location within Pennsylvania Location within the United States
- Location: Fleetwood-Lyons Rd., Richmond Township, Pennsylvania
- Coordinates: 40°27′32″N 75°49′19″W
- Area: 136 acres (55 ha)
- Built: 1789, c. 1850, 1887
- Architectural style: Pennsylvania bank barn
- MPS: Farms in Berks County MPS
- NRHP reference No.: 92000938
- Added to NRHP: July 29, 1992

The Christian Schlegel Farm is a historic farm complex and national historic district located in Richmond Township, Berks County, Pennsylvania. It was listed on the National Register of Historic Places in 1992.

== History ==
A diverse agricultural operation during the early years following its establishment circa 1789, the Christian Schlegel Farm was converted into a dairy farm during the early 20th century.

It was listed on the National Register of Historic Places in 1992.

== Architectural features ==
The Christian Schlegel Farm has eleven contributing buildings, one contributing site, seven contributing structures, and one contributing object, including: a 1 1/2-story, stone farmhouse with a rear ell (1789, c. 1850); 1 1/2-story, stone summer kitchen (1789); 1 1/2-story, brick school house (c. 1870); frame Pennsylvania bank barn (1887); three wagon sheds; privy; tool shed; milk house; and smokehouse. The contributing structures are two chicken houses, two grape arbors, ground cellar, earthen dam, and small frame brooder house. The contributing site is the family cemetery and the contributing object is a granite marker commemorating the acquisition of the farm by Christian Schlegel on August 15, 1738. The farm is no longer owned by the Schlegel family.

== Gallery ==
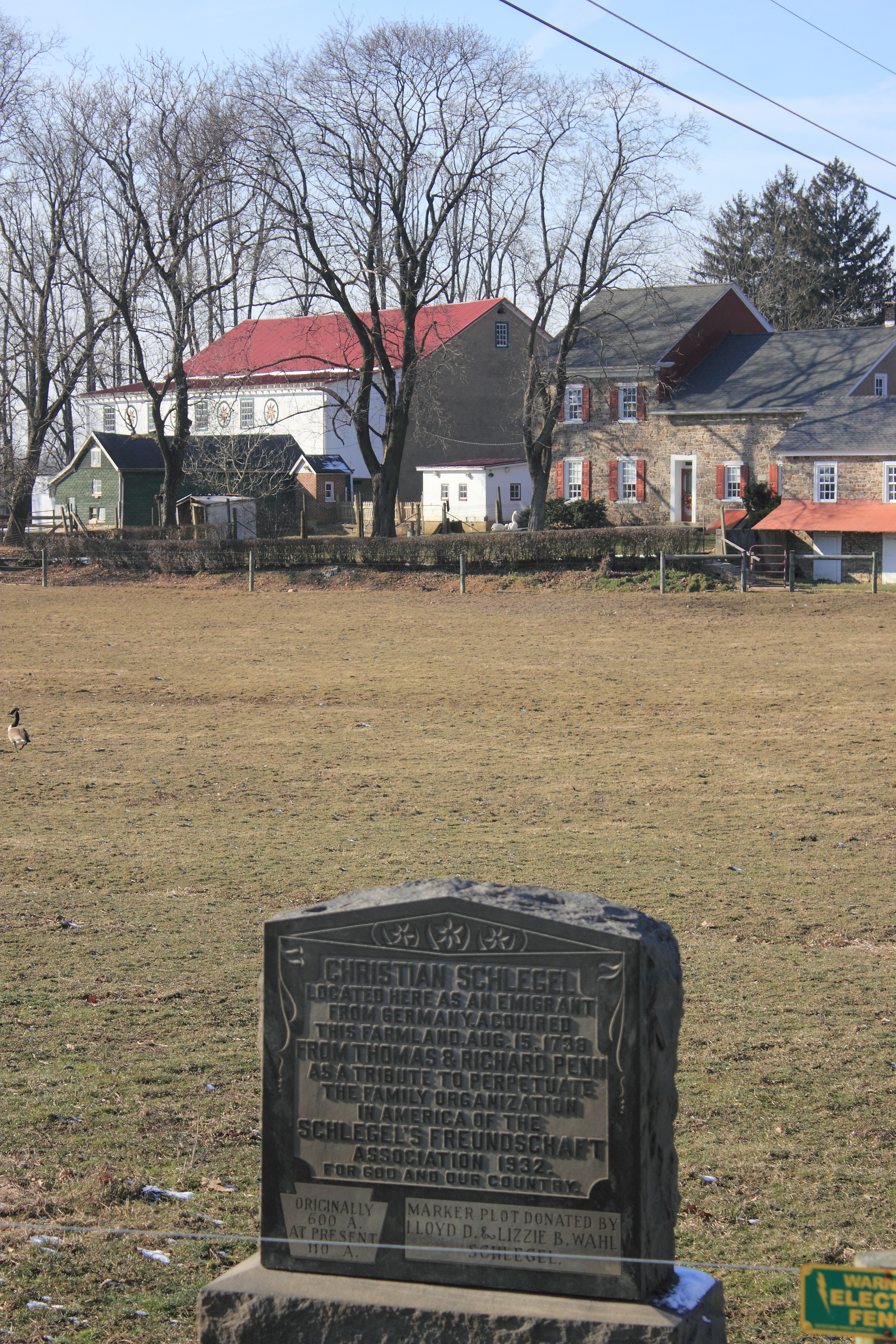
Christian Schlegel Farm, Fleetwood-Lyons Road Richmond PA
