= Knuckles Boyle =

American football player (1909–1943)

Profile
- Position: Tackle

Personal information
- Born: August 17, 1909; Jeanesville, Pennsylvania, U.S.
- Died: January 26, 1943 (aged 33); Mechanicsburg, Pennsylvania, U.S.
- Listed height: 5 ft 11 in (1.80 m)
- Listed weight: 232 lb (105 kg)

Career information
- High school: Tech (Harrisburg, Pennsylvania)
- College: Albright

Career history
- New York Giants (1934); Reading Keys (1935); Pittsburgh Americans (1936)

Awards and highlights
- NFL champion (1934)
- Stats at Pro Football Reference

Homer Reed Gilbert (August 17, 1909 – January 26, 1943), who sometimes played under the name Knuckles Boyle, was an American professional football tackle who played one season with the New York Giants of the National Football League (NFL). He played college football at Albright College.

== Early life ==
Gilbert also attended Harrisburg Technical High School in Harrisburg, Pennsylvania and the New York Military Academy in Cornwall-on-Hudson, New York.

== Professional career ==
Gilbert was a member of the New York Giants team that won the 1934 NFL Championship. Gilbert used the alias "Knuckles Boyle" because he could not be enrolled at Albright College and play professional football at the same time. "Boyles" was the name of a friend and he gained the name "Knuckles" for his toughness on the football field. He was also a member of the Reading Keys in 1934 and the Pittsburgh Americans in 1935. He also played baseball in the New York-Pennsylvania League.

== Personal life ==
Gilbert also attended Shippensburg State Teachers College. He was the freshman football coach of Franklin and Marshall College in 1938. He also served as a police officer in Mechanicsburg, Pennsylvania. He died of a heart attack while on duty on August 26, 1943.
