= Little Clearfield Creek =

Watercourse in Pennsylvania, US

Coordinates: 40.94279°N 78.44779°W

Little Clearfield Creek is a 14.5-mile-long (23.3 km) tributary of Clearfield Creek in Clearfield County, Pennsylvania in the United States.

Little Clearfield Creek joins Clearfield Creek near the community of Dimeling, approximately 8 miles (13 km) upstream of the West Branch Susquehanna River. It is formed by the confluence of Gazzam Run and Watts Creek.

== Tributaries ==
- Gazzam Run

== See also ==
- List of rivers of Pennsylvania
