= Moselem Farms Mill =

- U.S. National Register of Historic Places
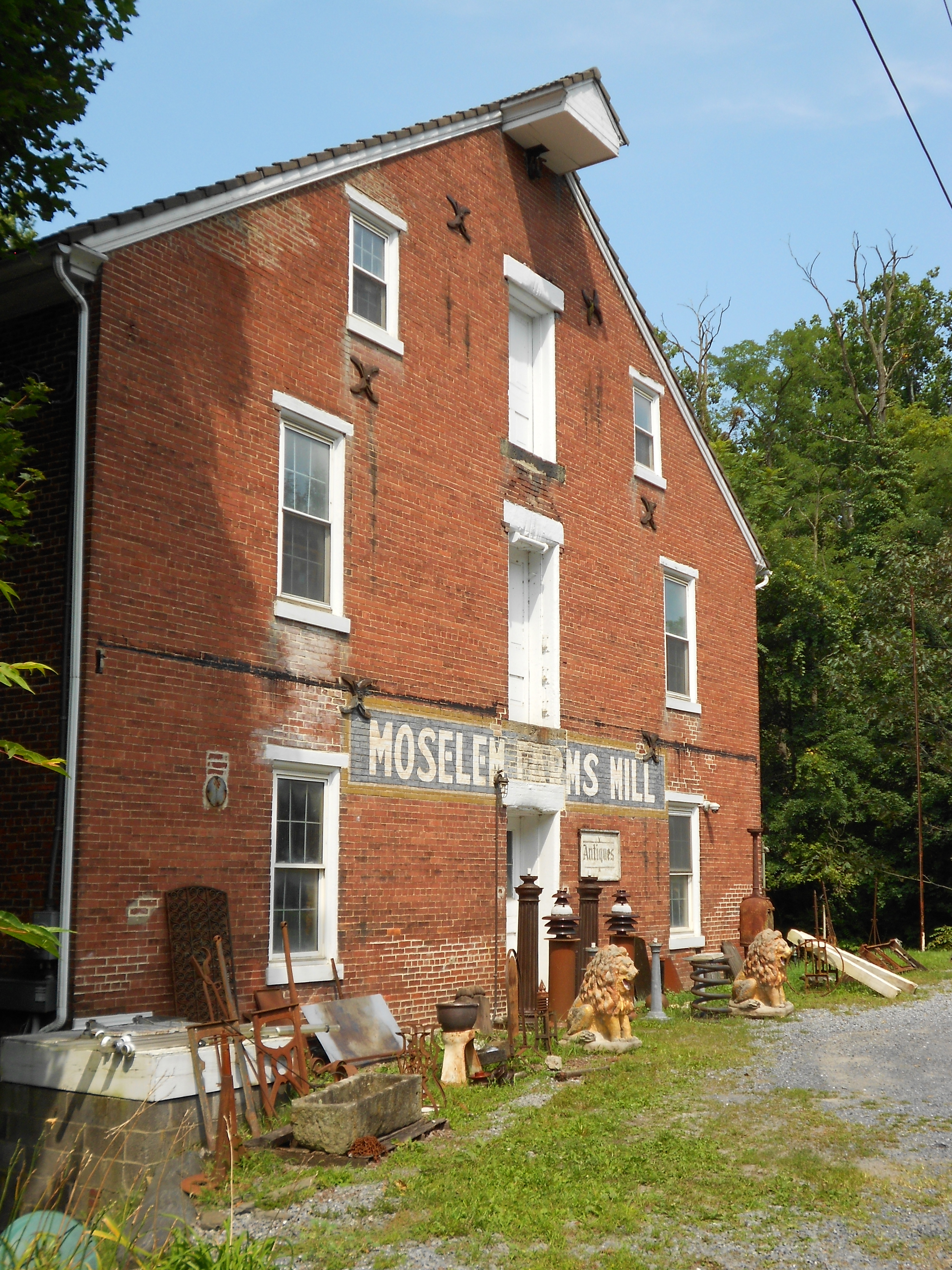
- Moselem Farms Mill on the NRHP since November 8, 1990. At the junction of Pennsylvania Route 662 and Forge Road, Richmond Township, Berks County, Pennsylvania

- Location within Pennsylvania Location within the United States
- Location: Jct. of PA 662 and Forge Rd., Richmond Township, Pennsylvania
- Coordinates: 40°30′08″N 75°52′47″W
- Area: 1 acre (0.40 ha)
- Built: c. 1860
- MPS: Gristmills in Berks County MPS
- NRHP reference No.: 90001627
- Added to NRHP: November 8, 1990

Moselem Farms Mill is a historic grist mill located in Richmond Township, Berks County, Pennsylvania. The mill was built about 1860, and is a 2 1/2-story, with basement, banked brick building on a stone foundation. It measures 45 feet, 4 inches, by 50 feet. The merchant mill was built as part of an iron furnace complex.

It was listed on the National Register of Historic Places in 1990.
