= Kempville, Pennsylvania =

Unincorporated community in Pennsylvania, US

- Unincorporated community
- Location within Pennsylvania Location within the United States
- Coordinates: 40°29′41″N 75°48′53″W
- Country: United States
- State: Pennsylvania
- County: Berks
- Township: Richmond
- Elevation: 371 ft (113 m)
- Time zone: UTC-5 (Eastern (EST))
  - Summer (DST): UTC-4 (EDT)
- Area codes: 610 and 484
- GNIS feature ID: 1178351

Kempville is an unincorporated community in Richmond Township in Berks County, Pennsylvania, United States. Kempville is located along U.S. Route 222, southwest of the southern end of the Kutztown Bypass.
