= Joel Dreibelbis Farm =

- U.S. National Register of Historic Places
- U.S. Historic district
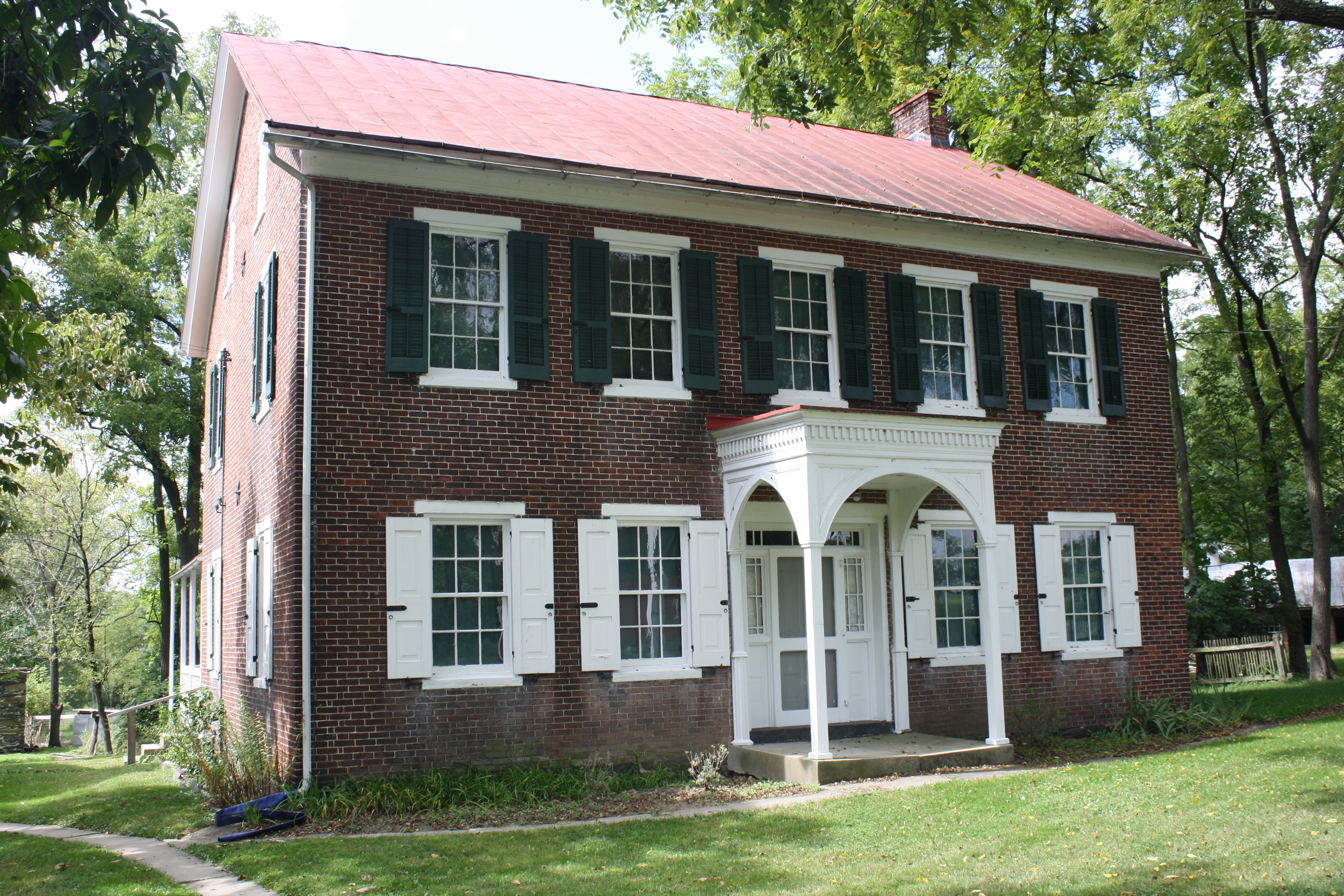
- Joel Dreibelbis Farm Farmhouse. September 2013.

- Location within Pennsylvania Location within the United States
- Location: PA 143 near Virginville, Richmond Township, Pennsylvania
- Coordinates: 40°31′06.6″N 75°52′26.5″W
- Area: 181 acres (73 ha)
- Built: 1868
- Architectural style: Federal
- NRHP reference No.: 89001820
- Added to NRHP: October 30, 1989

The Joel Dreibelbis Farm /draɪbəlbɪs/ is an historic farm complex and national historic district that are located in Richmond Township, Berks County, Pennsylvania, United States.

It was listed on the National Register of Historic Places in 1989.

== History and architectural features ==
This district has thirteen contributing buildings, one contributing site, and two contributing structures. They include a two-and-one-half-story, brick, vernacular, Federal-style farmhouse (1868), a one-and-one-half-story, summer kitchen (c. 1870), a one-and-one-half-story, stone and frame combination smokehouse/wash house/ storage cellar (1882), a stone ice house (c. 1875), a frame Pennsylvania bank barn that sits on a stone foundation (1908), a wagon shed/corn crib, and farm-related outbuildings.The property also includes an abandoned limestone quarry and abandoned railroad bed and bridge.

== Gallery ==
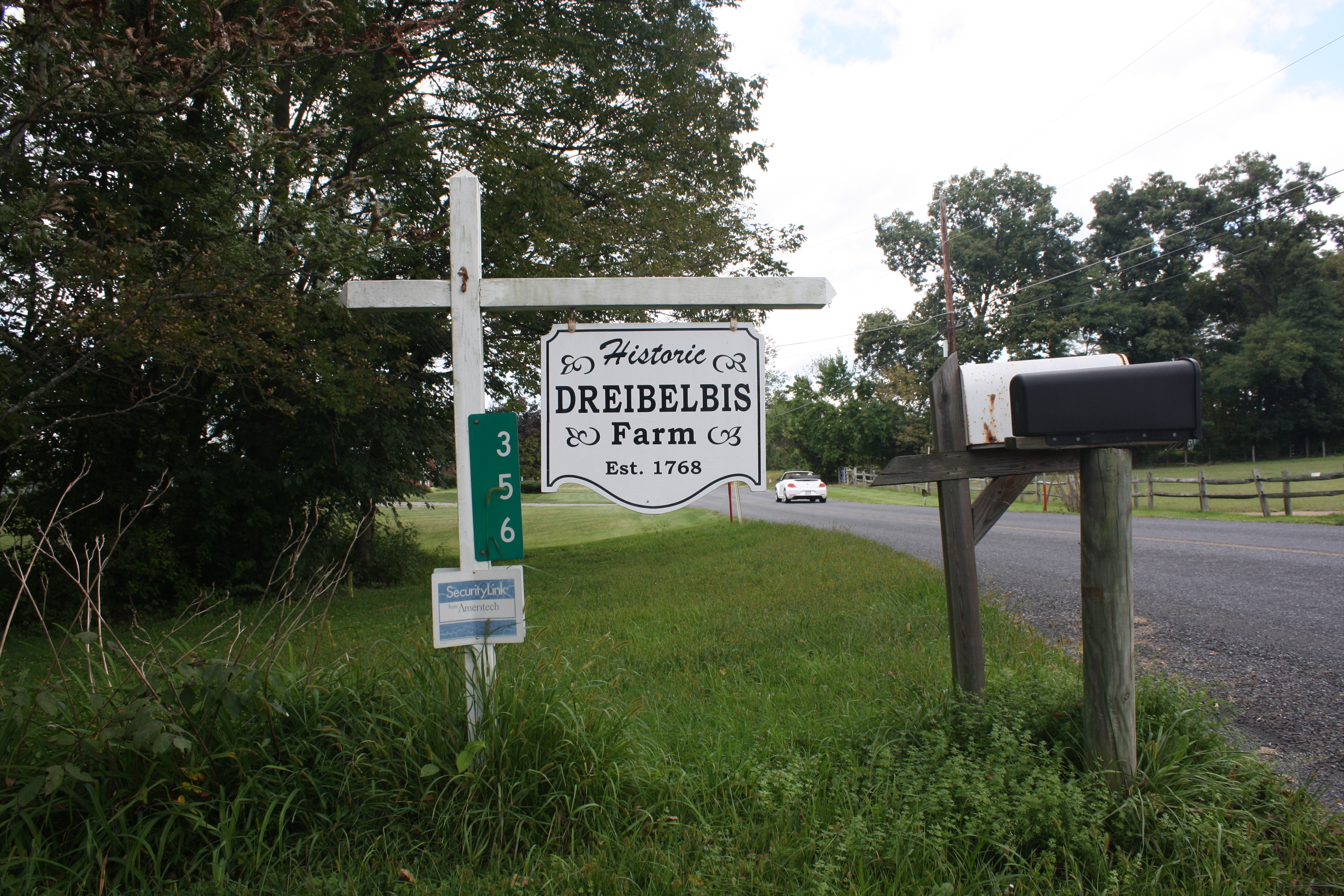
Farm entrance

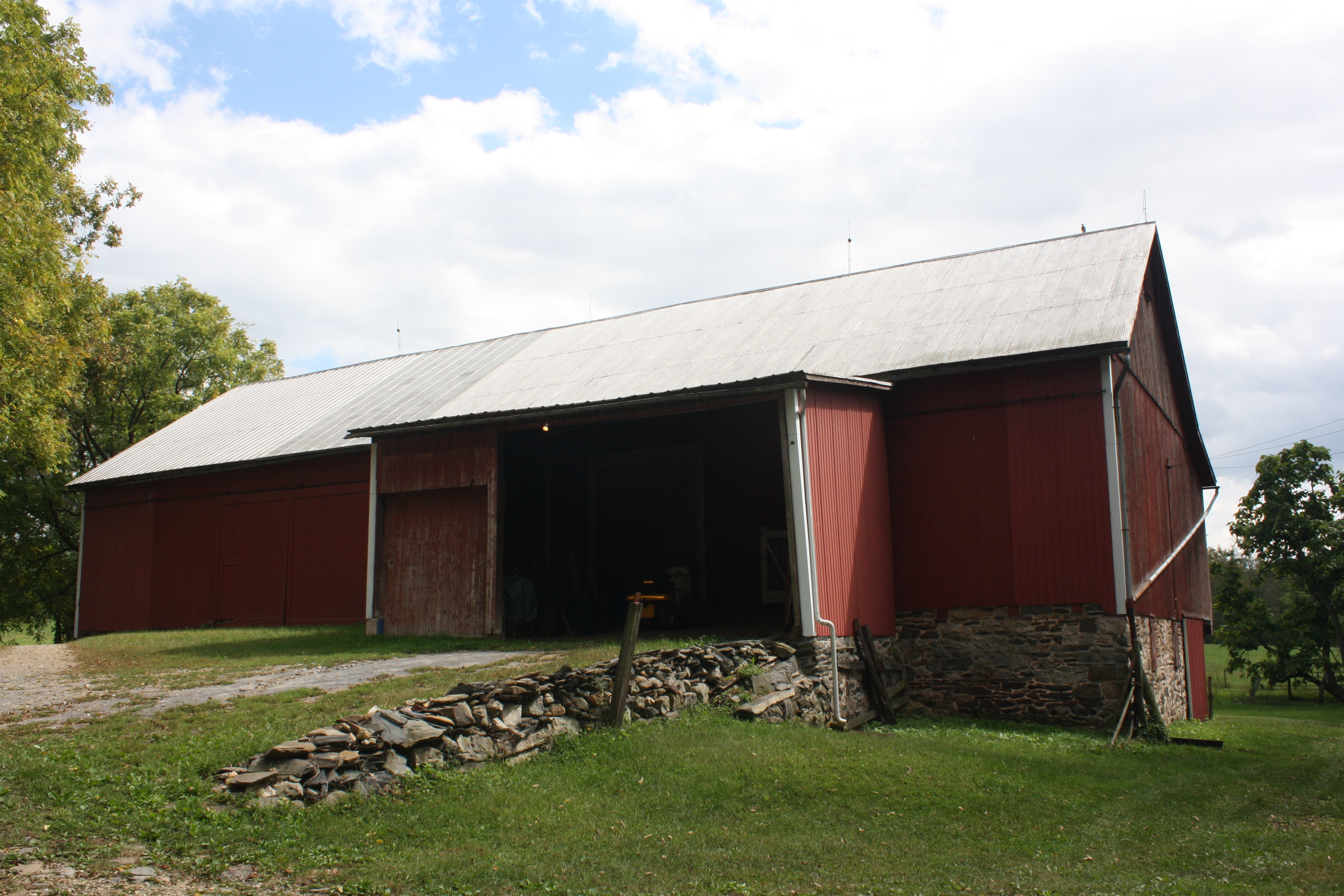
Barn

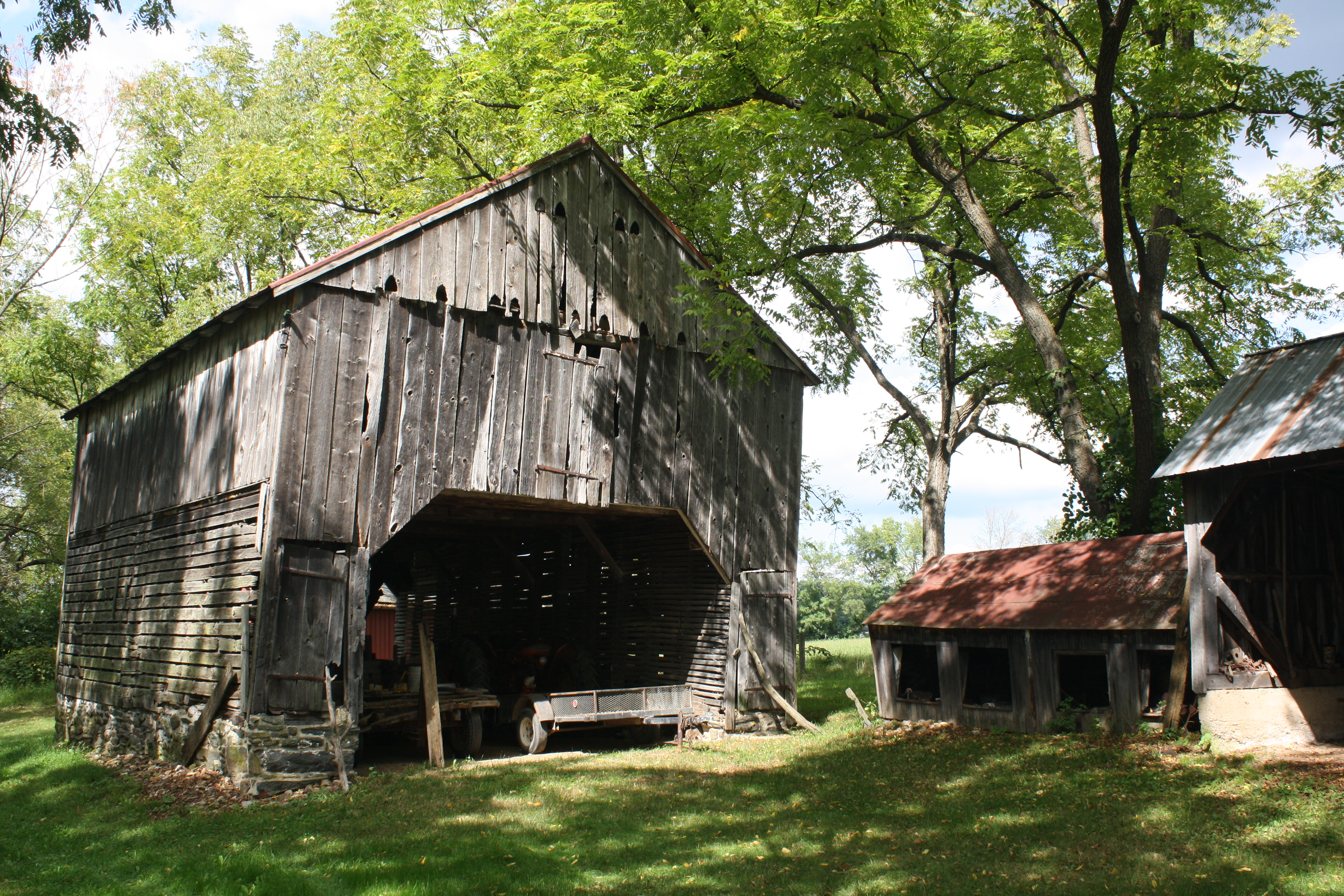
Wagon shed/corn crib

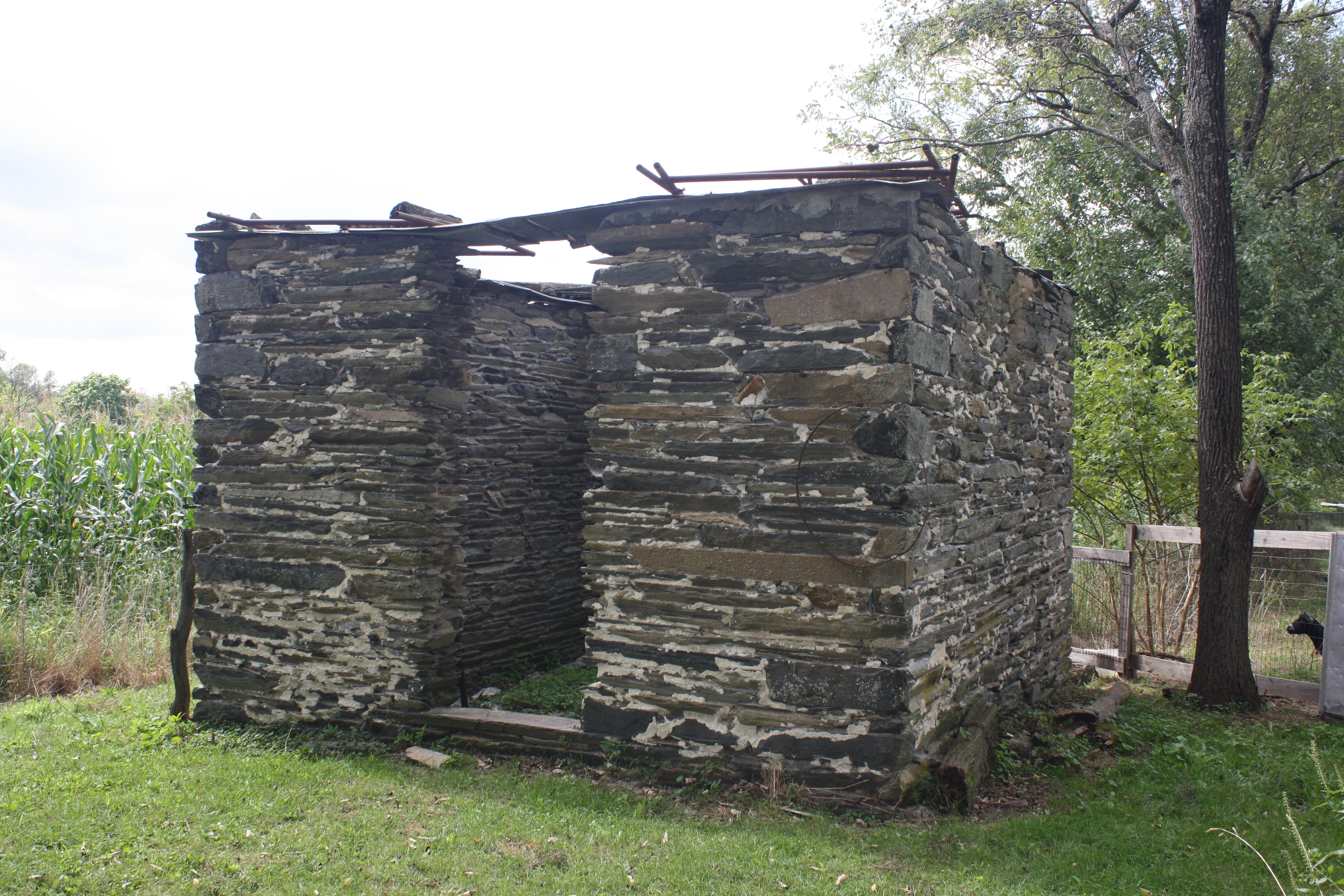
Ice house ruins

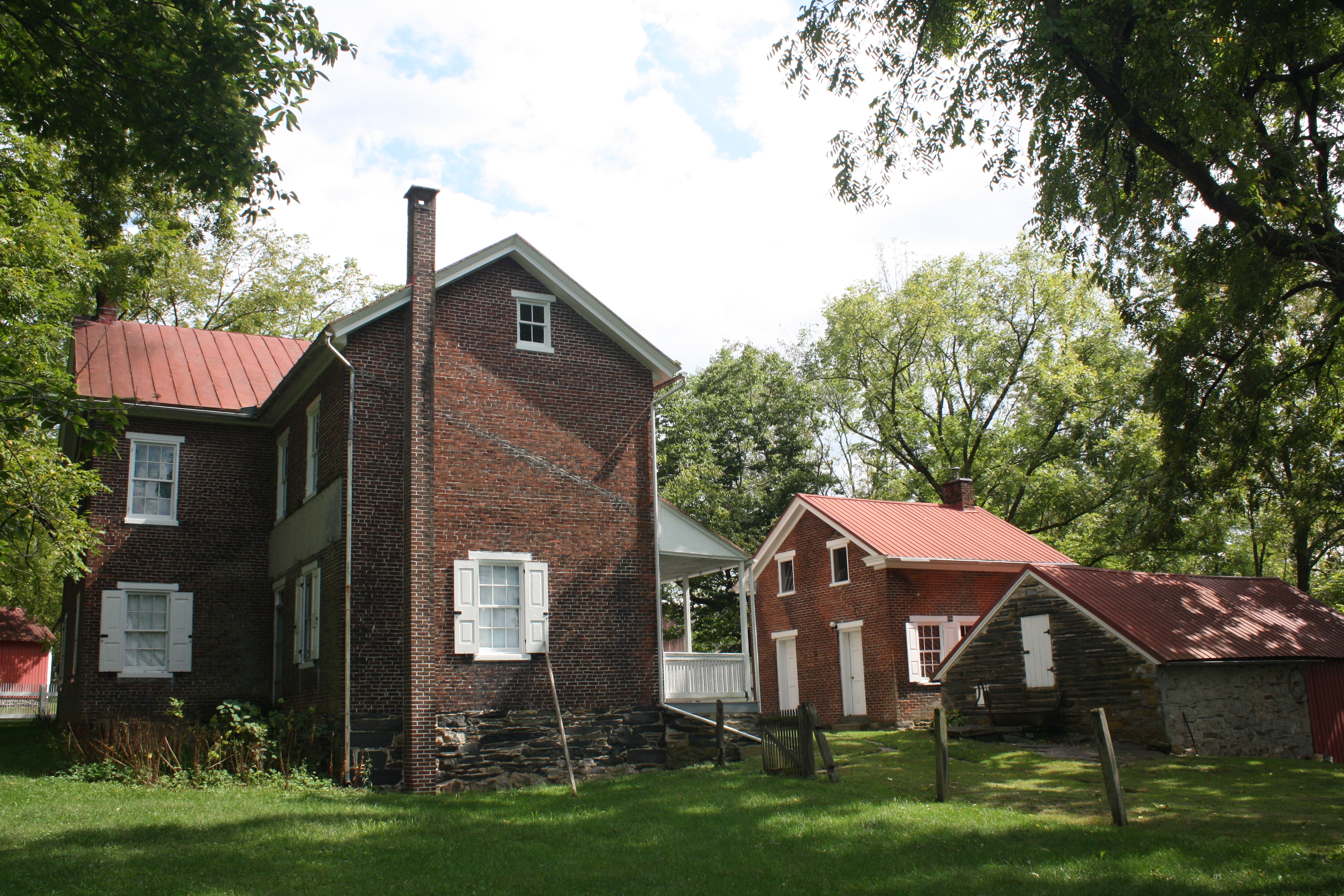
Farmhouse backyard, summer kitchen and smoke house
