= Richmond Township, Berks County, Pennsylvania =

Township in Pennsylvania, US

Richmond Township
- Township
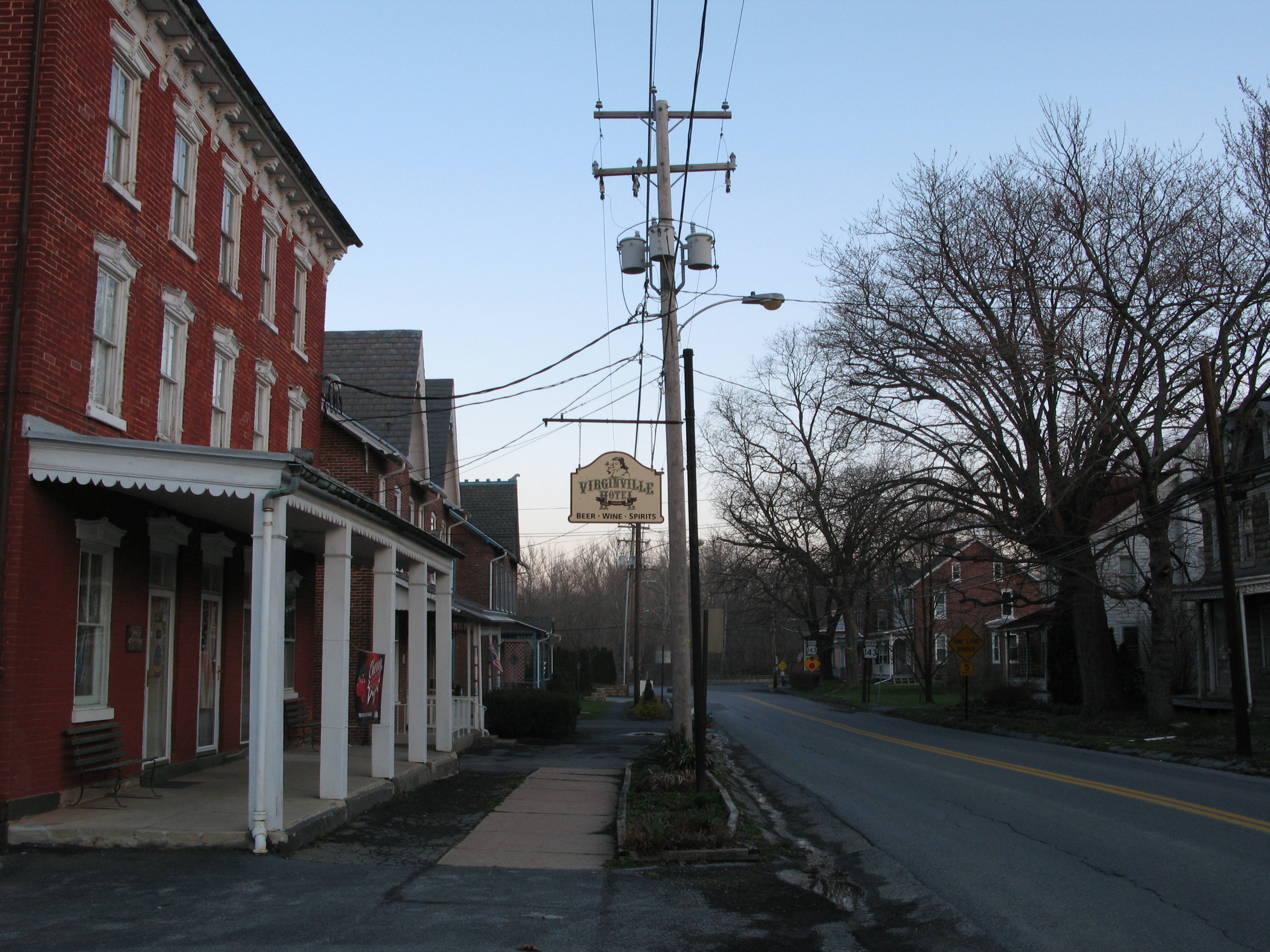
- The Virginville Hotel on Pennsylvania Route 143 in Richmond Township

- Location of Richmond Township in Pennsylvania Richmond Township (the United States)
- Coordinates: 40°29′00″N 75°49′11″W
- Country: United States
- State: Pennsylvania
- County: Berks

Area
  - Total: 23.81 sq mi (61.67 km^{2})
  - Land: 23.76 sq mi (61.54 km^{2})
  - Water: 0.050 sq mi (0.13 km^{2})
- Elevation: 397 ft (121 m)

Population (2010)
  - Total: 3,397
  - Estimate (2016): 3,496
  - Density: 147.1/sq mi (56.81/km^{2})
- Time zone: UTC-5 (EST)
  - Summer (DST): UTC-4 (EDT)
- ZIP Codes: 19522, 19530, 19564
- Area code: 610
- FIPS code: 42-011-64592
- Website: https://www.richmond-township.org/

Richmond Township is a township in Berks County, Pennsylvania, United States. The population was 3,397 at the 2010 census.

== History ==
The Joel Dreibelbis Farm, Merkel Mill Complex, Moselem Farms Mill, Christian Schlegel Farm, and Virginville Historic District are listed on the National Register of Historic Places.

== Geography ==
According to the United States Census Bureau, the township has a total area of 23.7 square miles (61.3 km^{2}), of which 23.6 square miles (61.2 km^{2}) is land and 0.04 square mile (0.1 km^{2}) (0.17%) is water. It is drained by the Maiden Creek into the Schuylkill River and its southern boundary is on South Mountain. Crystal Cave is also located within Richmond Township.

Its villages include Kempville, Kirbyville, Moselem (pronounced "mo-SAY-lem"), Moselem Springs, Virginville, and Walnuttown (also in Maidencreek Township.)

=== Adjacent municipalities ===
- Greenwich Township (north)
- Maxatawny Township (northeast)
- Rockland Township (southeast)
- Ruscombmanor Township (south)
- Fleetwood (south)
- Maidencreek Township (southwest)
- Ontelaunee Township (tangent to the west)
- Perry Township (west)

=== Climate ===
The township has a hot-summer humid continental climate (Dfa) and the local hardiness zone is 6b. Average monthly temperatures in Moselem Springs range from 29.3 °F in January to 74.1 °F in July.

== Demographics ==
Historical population
Census	Pop.	Note	%±
1980	3,204		—
1990	3,439		7.3%
2000	3,500		1.8%
2010	3,397		−2.9%
2016 (est.)	3,496		2.9%
Source: US Census Bureau

As of the census of 2000, there were 3,500 people, 1,416 households, and 957 families living in the township. The population density was 148.2 inhabitants per square mile (57.2/km^{2}). There were 1,484 housing units at an average density of 62.8 per square mile (24.2/km^{2}). The racial makeup of the township was 98.54% White, 0.14% African American, 0.09% Native American, 0.26% Asian, 0.06% Pacific Islander, 0.51% from other races, and 0.40% from two or more races. Hispanic or Latino of any race were 0.97% of the population.

There were 1,416 households, out of which 28.4% had children under the age of 18 living with them, 57.7% were married couples living together, 5.9% had a female householder with no husband present, and 32.4% were non-families. 25.7% of all households were made up of individuals, and 8.8% had someone living alone who was 65 years of age or older. The average household size was 2.47 and the average family size was 2.99.

In the township the population was spread out, with 23.4% under the age of 18, 7.3% from 18 to 24, 30.1% from 25 to 44, 24.7% from 45 to 64, and 14.4% who were 65 years of age or older. The median age was 39 years. For every 100 females, there were 100.1 males. For every 100 females age 18 and over, there were 100.1 males.

The median income for a household in the township was $42,564, and the median income for a family was $52,950. Males had a median income of $37,028 versus $24,730 for females. The per capita income for the township was $20,235. About 5.3% of families and 8.5% of the population were below the poverty line, including 14.2% of those under age 18 and 7.0% of those age 65 or over.

== Transportation ==
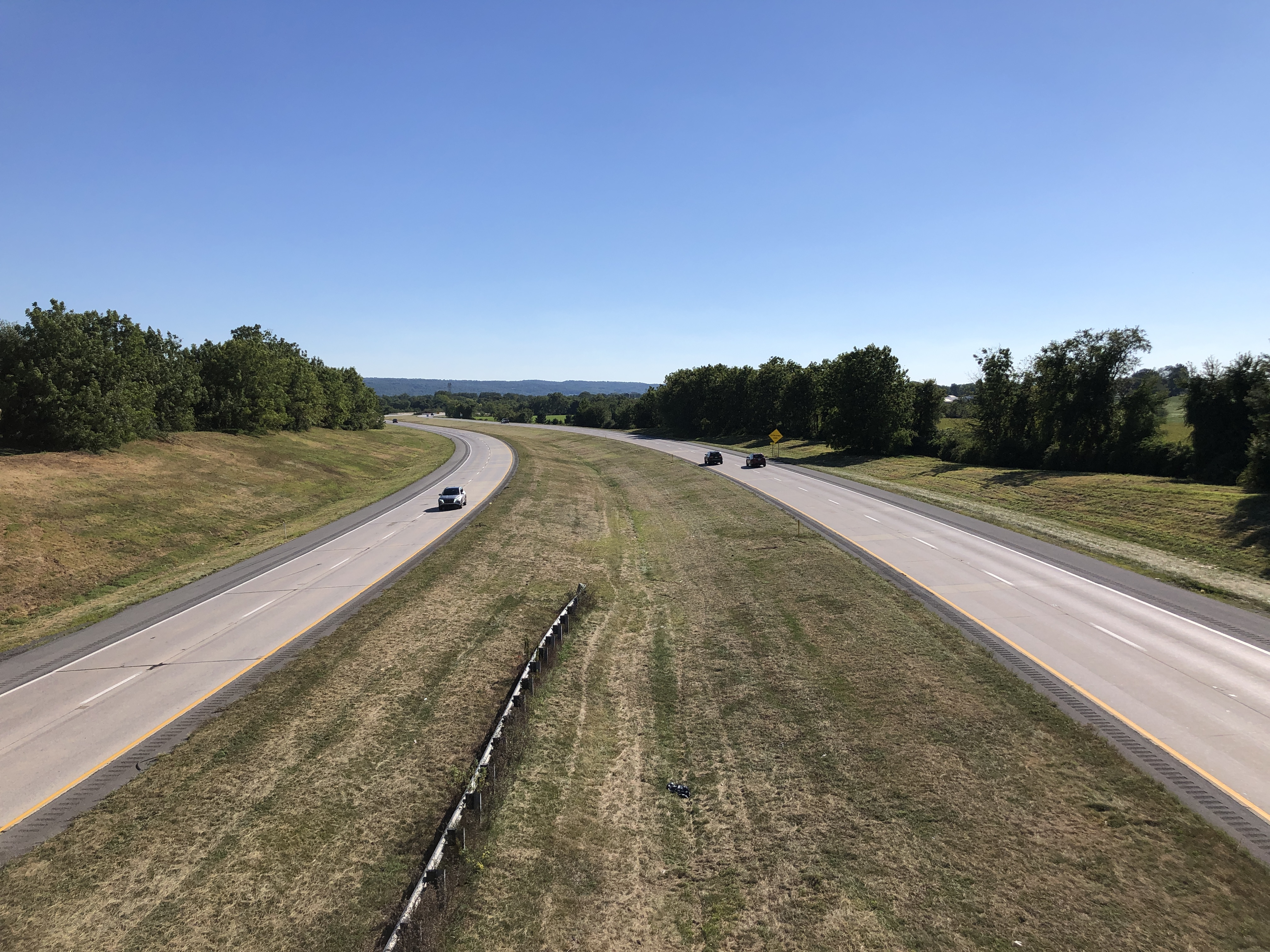
US 222 southbound in Richmond Township

As of 2020, there were 72.00 miles (115.87 km) of public roads in Richmond Township, of which 28.21 miles (45.40 km) were maintained by the Pennsylvania Department of Transportation (PennDOT) and 43.79 miles (70.47 km) were maintained by the township.

Numbered routes in Richmond Township are U.S. Route 222 and Pennsylvania Route 662, which intersect at a roundabout in Moselem Springs, and Pennsylvania Route 143. Other local roads of note include Crystal Cave Road, Fleetwood Road, Fleetwood-Lyons Road, Maiden Creek Road, Park Road, and Richmond Road. Berks Area Regional Transportation Authority (BARTA) bus route 22 serves the township as well as Fleetwood and Lyons, providing a route for workers to the East Penn Manufacturing Company plant in Lyons.

== Recreation ==
A small portion of the Pennsylvania State Game Lands Number 182 is located near the northeast corner of the township.
