= Moselem Springs, Pennsylvania =

- Unincorporated community
- Location within Pennsylvania Location within the United States
- Coordinates: 40°29′08″N 75°50′19″W
- Country: United States
- State: Pennsylvania
- County: Berks
- Township: Richmond
- Elevation: 423 ft (129 m)
- Time zone: UTC-5 (Eastern (EST))
  - Summer (DST): UTC-4 (EDT)
- ZIP Code: 19522
- Area codes: 610 and 484
- GNIS feature ID: 1181604

Moselem Springs is an unincorporated community in Berks County, Pennsylvania, United States. It is located at the roundabout junction of Pennsylvania Route 662 (Moselem Springs Road) and U.S. Highway 222 in Richmond Township.

Buildings in the area include the Richmond Township Municipal Building, Lehigh Valley Health Network's Health Center at Moselem Springs in a historic inn constructed circa 1852, and the former Richmond Elementary School. The place name comes from the Unami-Len'api term Masch'il'am'ek, which means "trout." In Minsi-Len'api "trout" is Mesch'ila'meek.

== Gallery ==
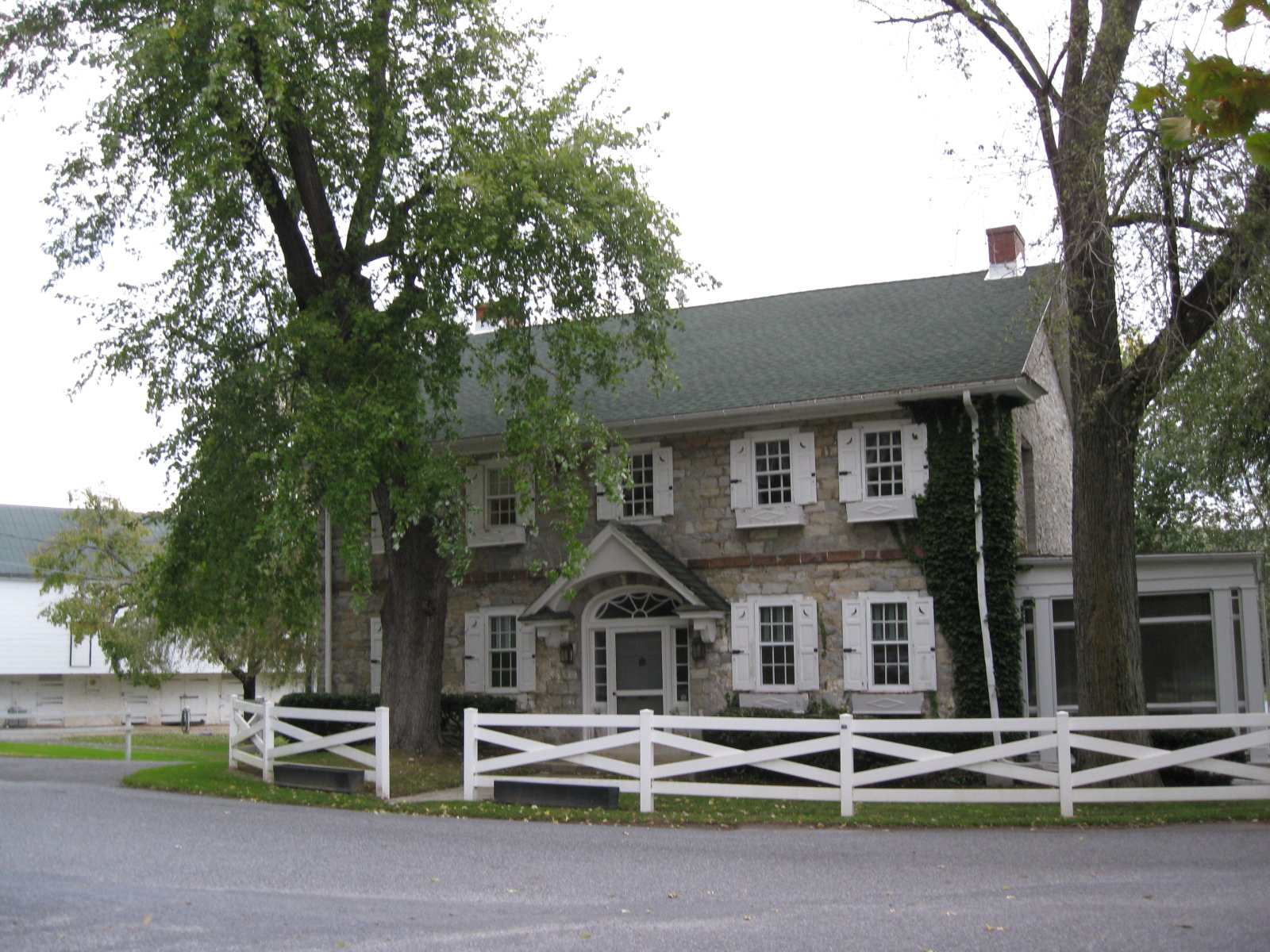

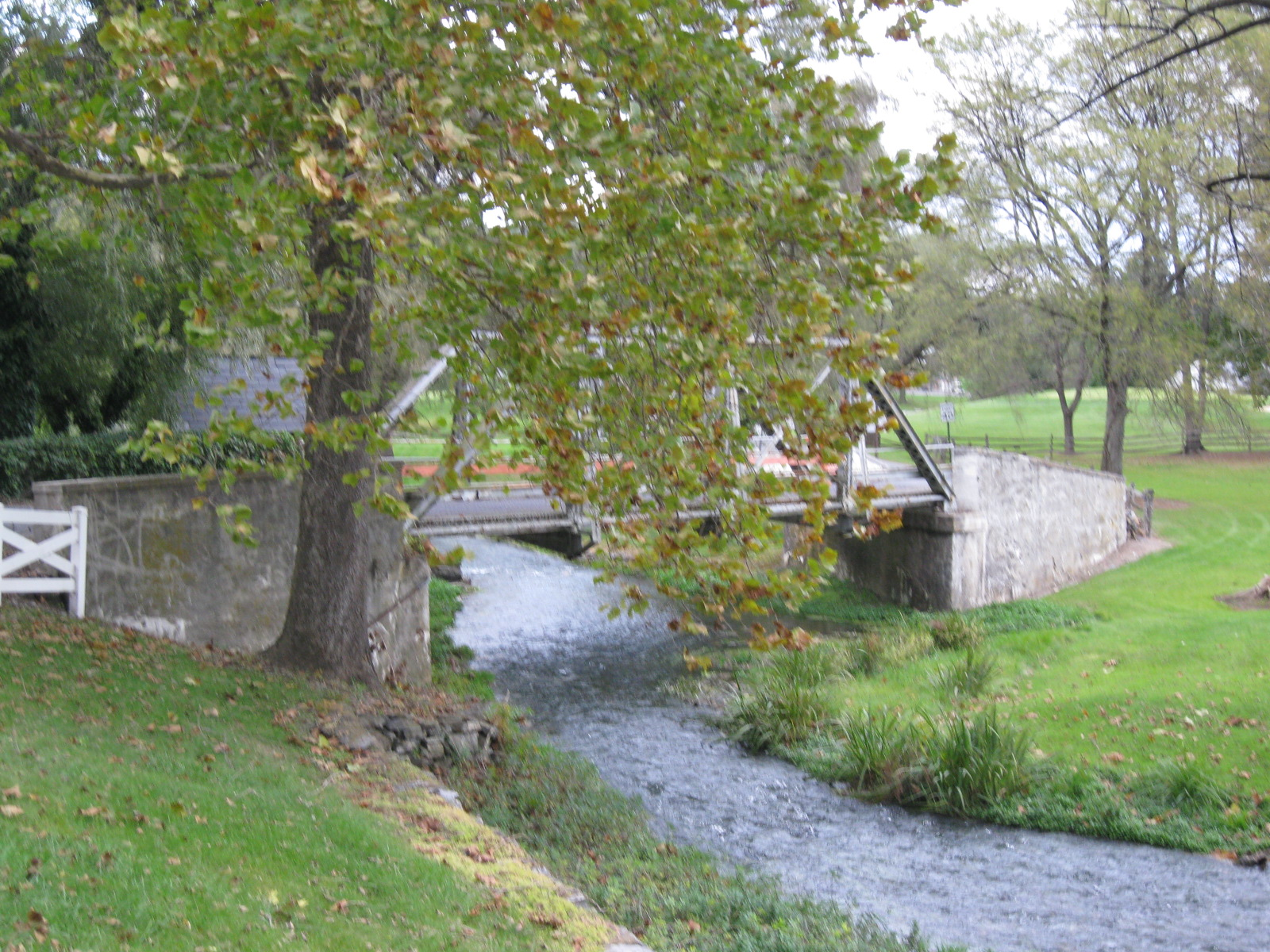

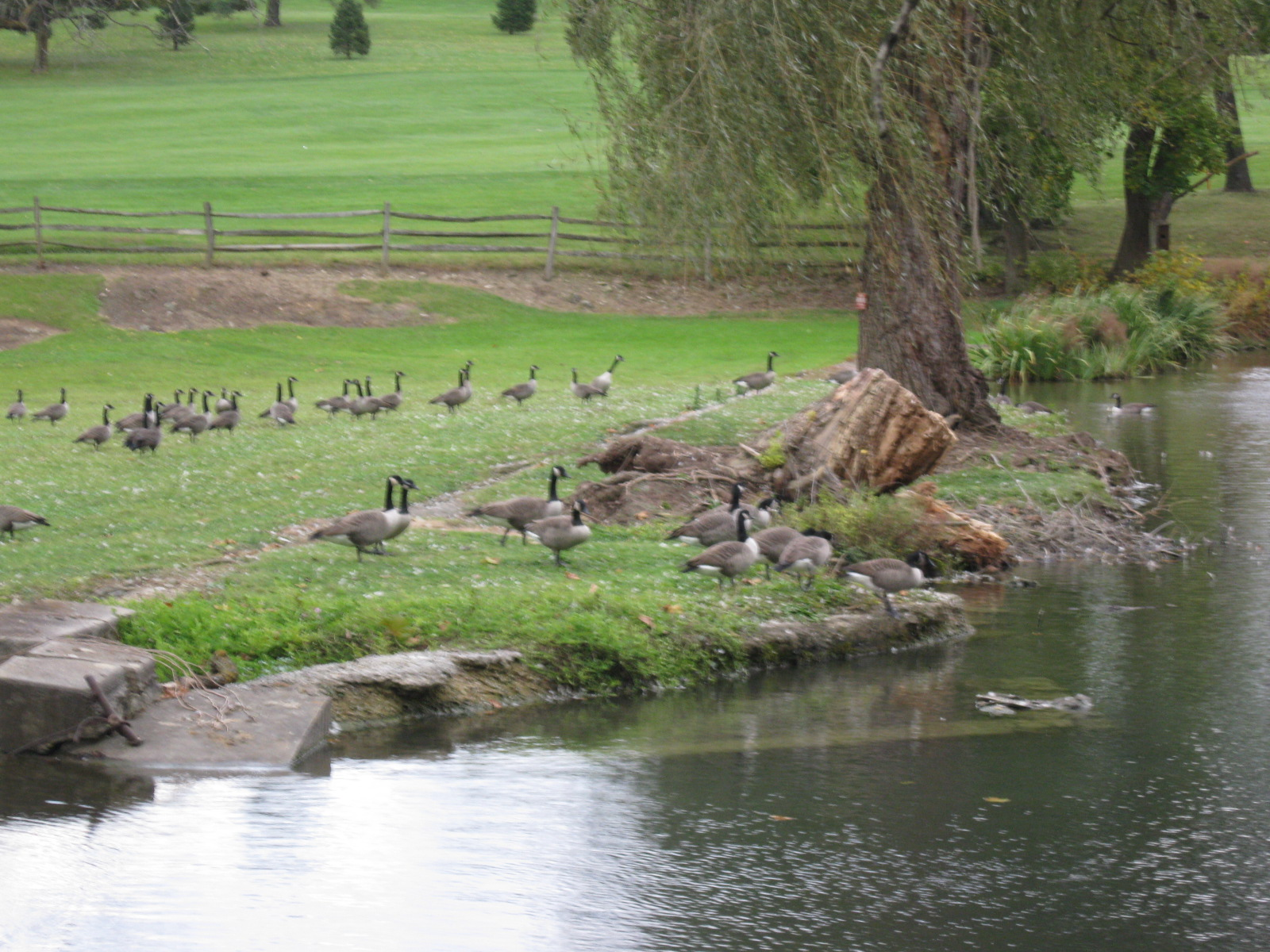
