= Jeanesville, Pennsylvania =

Unincorporated community in Pennsylvania, US

Coordinates: 40°55′39″N 75°58′14″W

Jeanesville or Jeansville is an unincorporated community in Hazle Township, Luzerne County, Pennsylvania, United States. In 1891 a mine in Jeanesville flooded, killing 18 miners. Former NFL player Knuckles Boyle was born in Jeanesville.
