= Jollytown, Pennsylvania =

Unincorporated community in Pennsylvania, U.S.

Coordinates: 39°43′42″N 80°19′18″W

Jollytown is an unincorporated community in Gilmore Township, Greene County, in the U.S. state of Pennsylvania.

== History ==
Jollytown was founded by Titus Jolley, and named for him. A post office called Jollytown was established in 1845, and remained in operation until it was discontinued in 1954.
