= Jamestown, Cambria County, Pennsylvania =

Jamestown, Pennsylvania
- Unincorporated community Census designated place
- Location within Pennsylvania Location within the United States
- Coordinates: 40°24′7.2″N 78°39′28.8″W
- Country: United States
- State: Pennsylvania
- County: Cambria
- Township: Portage

Area
  - Total: 0.625 sq mi (1.62 km^{2})
  - Land: 0 sq mi (0 km^{2})
  - Water: 0.625 sq mi (1.62 km^{2})
- Elevation: 1,762 ft (537 m)
- Time zone: UTC-5 (Eastern (EST))
  - Summer (DST): UTC-4 (EDT)
- FIPS code: 42-37680
- GNIS feature ID: 28-30815

Jamestown is an unincorporated community and census designated place (CDP) in Poratge Township, Cambria County, Pennsylvania.

== Demographics ==
Historical population
| Census | Pop. | Note | %± |
|---|---|---|---|
U.S. Decennial Census

The United States Census Bureau first defined Jamestown as a census designated place in 2023.
