= William Scull =

American cartographer

William Scull (1739-1784) was an American cartographer and officer during the Revolutionary War. Scull was the grandson of Nicholas Scull, who was the colonial Surveyor General of Pennsylvania. In 1770, he published a map of Pennsylvania with Robert Sayer and John Bennett and engraved by Henry Dawkins and James Nevil in Philadelphia. It was republished in many editions in France and England, although it is considered a compilation of the work of other cartographers. He was commissioned an officer with the rank of captain in the 11th Pennsylvania Regiment. He retired from that position on July 1, 1778, to take a position on the staff of Robert Erskine in the Geographer's Department of the Continental Army. William Scull was also a member of the American Philosophical Society, elected in 1768, from Reading, Pennsylvania.

== Publications ==
- Scull, William, Robert Sayer, and John Bennett. 1775. A map of Pennsylvania exhibiting not only the improved parts of that province, but also its extensive frontiers, laid down from actual surveys, and chiefly from the late map of W. Scull published in 1770. Collection D'Anville. London: printed for Rob. Sayer & J. Bennett.
- Robert Sayer and John Bennett (Firm), Thomas Jefferys, and William Scull. 1776. A map of Pennsylvania exhibiting not only the improved parts of that Province, but also its extensive frontiers : laid down from actual surveys, and chiefly from the late map of W. Scull published in 1770; and humbly inscribed to the Honorable Thomas Penn and Richard Penn, Esquires, true and absolute proprietaries & Governors of the Province of Pennsylvania and the territories thereunto belonging. American Atlas. London: Printed for Robt. Sayer & J. Bennett.
- Le Rouge, Georges-Louis, and William Scull. 1777. La Pensilvanie en trois feuilles, traduite des meilleures cartes anglaises. A map of Pennsylvania exhibiting not only the improved parts of that Province, but also its extensive frontiers: Laid down from actual surveys and chiefly from the late map of W. Scull published in 1770; and humbly inscribed to the Honourable Thomas Penn and Richard Penn, Esquires, true and absolute proprietaries and Governors of the Province of Pennsylvania and the territories thereunto belonging. Paris: Chez Le Rouge.
- Erskine, Robert, William Scull, Simeon De Witt, and Richard Varrick De Witt. 1778. Road from Little Britain's Meetg Ho. to Peach Bottom Ferry. No 130 (2nd).
- Erskine, Robert, William Scull, Simeon De Witt, and Richard Varrick De Witt. 1778. From McPherson ford to Taylors Ford on Octorara. No 130 (1st).
- Le Rouge, Georges Louis, Charles Blaskowitz, Thomas Jefferys, William Scull, Michael Lane, Joseph Frederick Wallet Des Barres, Anthony Smith, and Charles Morris. 1778. Pilote americain septentrional pour les côtes de Labrador, N.lle Ecosse, N.lle Angleterre New-York, Pensilvanie, Maryland Virginie, les 2. Carolines et Florides. A Paris: chez le Rouge ing.r géographe du roi rue des g.ds Augustins.
- Erskine, Robert, William Scull, Simeon De Witt, and Richard Varrick De Witt. 1778. Road from White Plains to Dobbs' Ferry. No 9.
- Erskine, Robert, William Scull, Simeon De Witt, and Richard Varrick De Witt. 1779. Road from Quibbletown to Amboy; and places by bearings. No 55.
- Erskine, Robert, Simeon De Witt, Richard Varrick De Witt, and William Scull. 1779. Contraction in the Jerseys. No 98, A.
- Erskine, Robert, Simeon De Witt, Richard Varrick De Witt, and William Scull. 1779. Projections +c for closing and trying the meeting of Surveys. No. 99, C.
- Erskine, Robert, Simeon De Witt, Richard Varrick De Witt, and William Scull. 1779. General Contraction of the Road from near Chester in New Jersey to Chestnut Hill in Pennsylvania For the purpose of projecting and adjusting the different surveys in a general map. No 99, A.
- Neele, Samuel John, William Scull, Thomas Hutchins, Joshua Fry, and Peter Jefferson. 1787. A map of the country between Albemarle Sound, and Lake Erie: comprehending the whole of Virginia, Maryland, Delaware and Pennsylvania. [S.l.]: [s.n.]. http://www.worldcat.org/oclc/605239021.
