= Crystal Cave (Pennsylvania) =

Show cave in Pennsylvania

Coordinates: 40.5257°N 75.8426°W

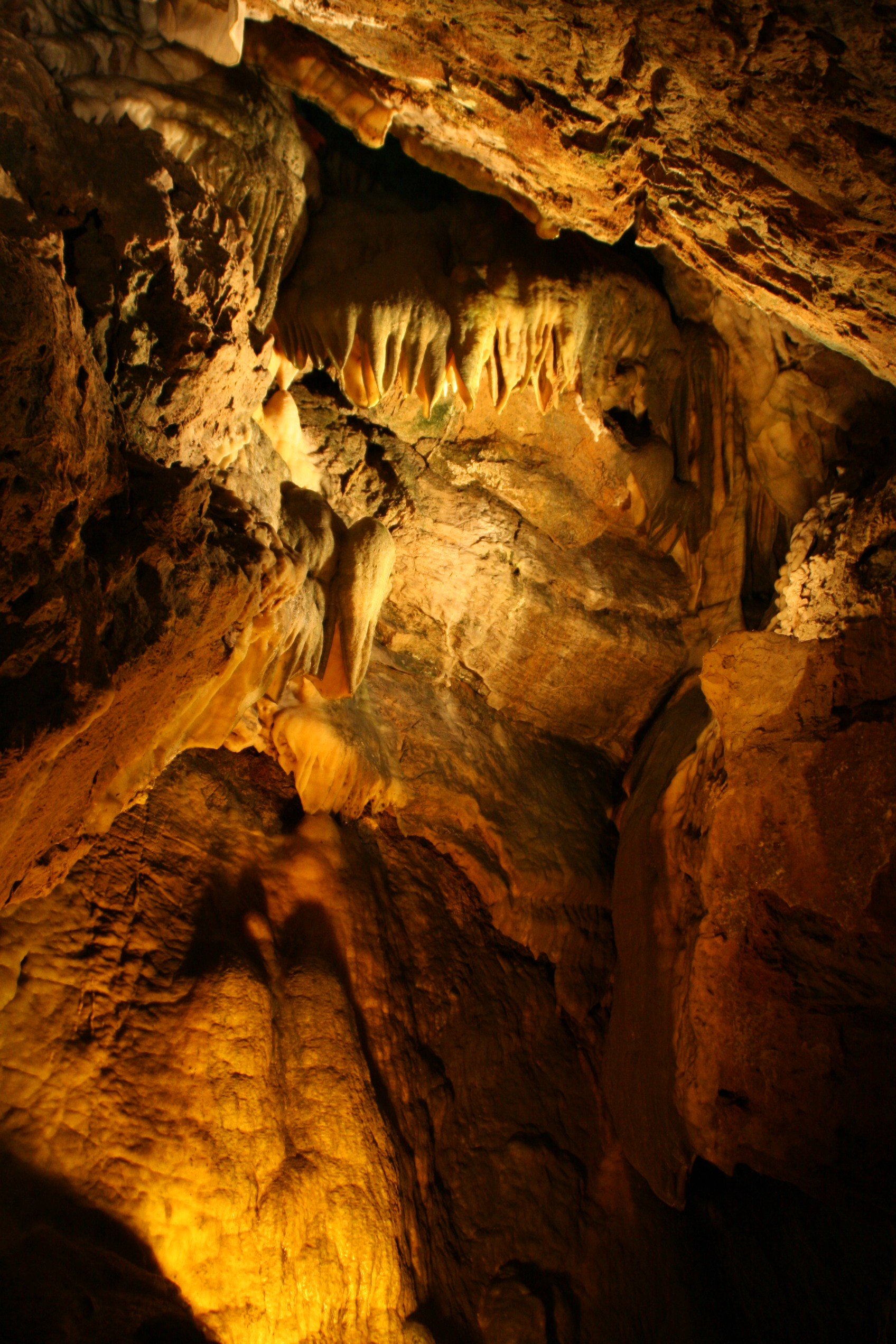
Formations found in Crystal Cave.

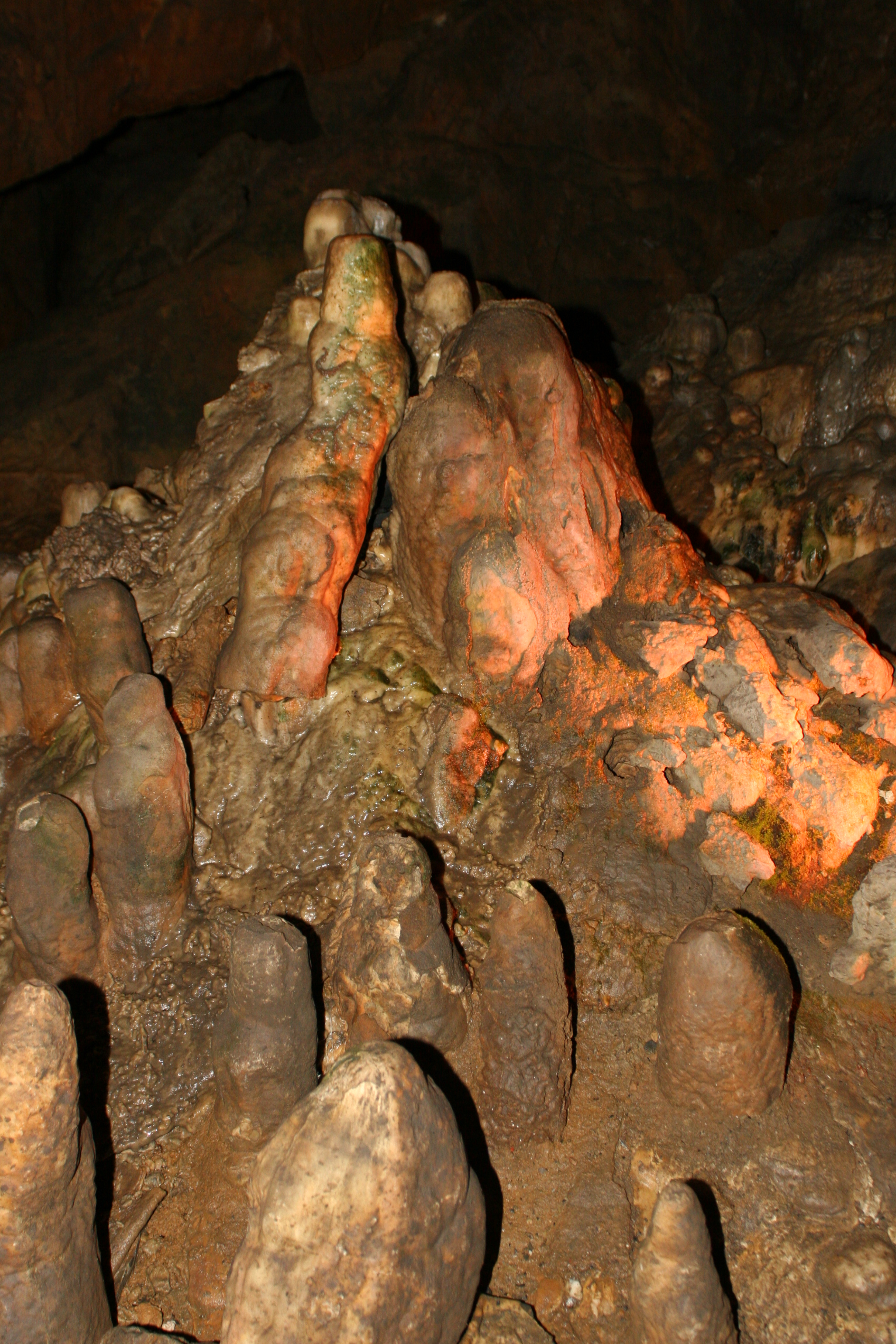
Odd shapes can be found all around the cave.

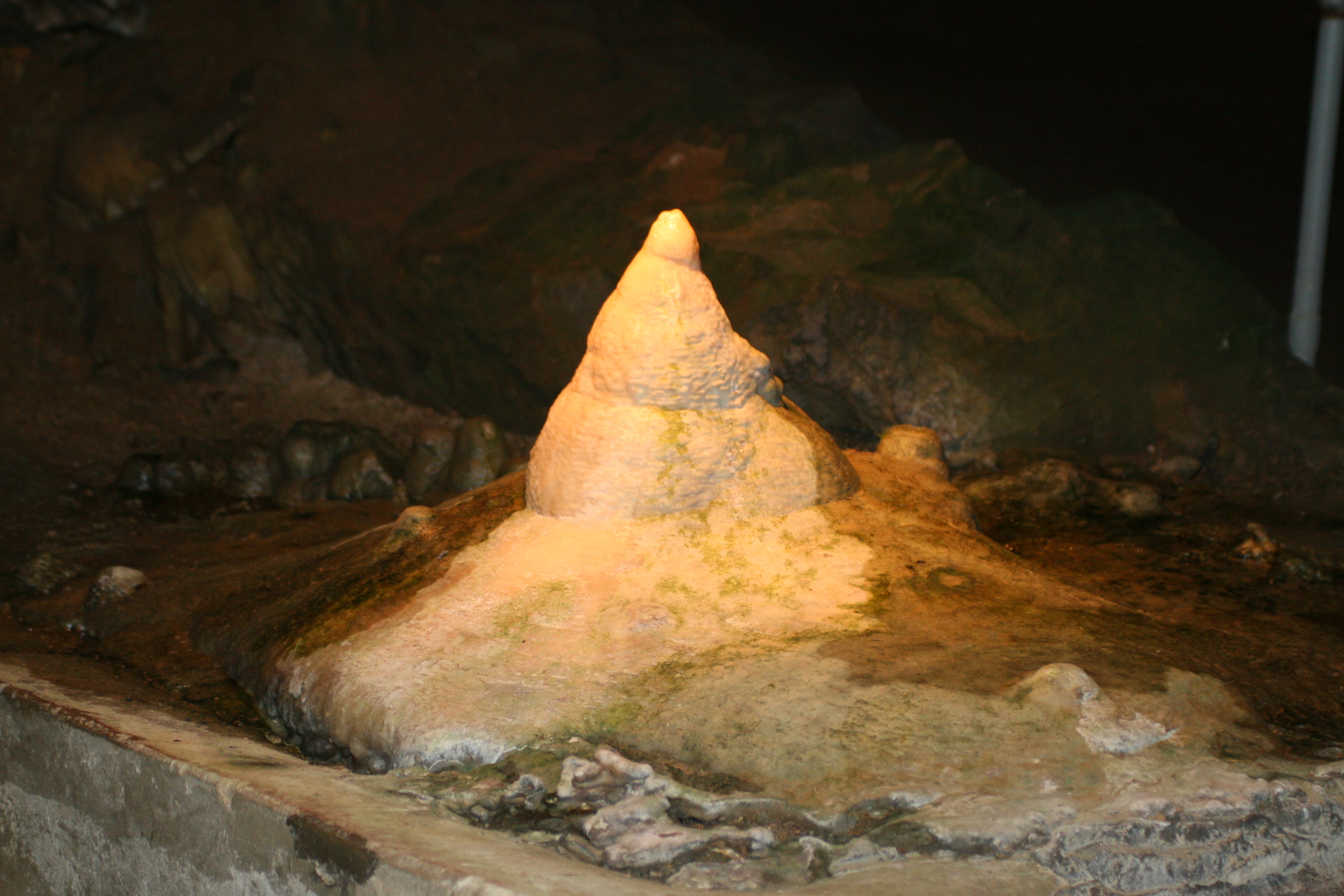
The Upside-Down Ice cream Cone.

Crystal Cave is a cave in Richmond Township, near Kutztown, in Berks County, Pennsylvania, United States, the heart of Pennsylvania Dutch Country. It was discovered by William Merkel and John Gehret on November 12, 1871, and quickly became a popular tourist attraction.

Shortly after its discovery, newspapers reported that it was "more beautiful than the famous Mammoth cave in Kentucky." The first "show cave" to open in Pennsylvania, it remains one of the oldest continuously operating show caves in the United States.

== History ==
Crystal Cave was discovered on November 12, 1871, while John Gehret and William Merkel were in the process of extracting limestone from a steep hill near Kutztown, Pennsylvania, for use by neighboring farmers to improve the quality of their fields. After setting off a dynamite charge to free the limestone, they noticed that they had created a hole large enough to walk through. Almost immediately after word broke about their find, locals began entering the cave to explore it, frequently removing the calcite and aragonite crystals and rock specimens they found there as prized souvenirs. Frustrated by the damage being done to the cave, Greenwich Township farmer Samuel D. F. Kohler purchased the cave and surrounding land (a total of 47 acres (190,000 m^{2}) for $5,000 in early 1872, and erected a wooden door to prevent prospectors and other trespassers from entering without permission. On May 25, 1872, six months after the cave's discovery by Gehret and Merkel, Kohler then held a public ceremony in which he formally opened the cave for business. Terming the event the "Grand Illumination of the Crystal Cave," he invited the Greenwich Cornet Band to perform.

The next year Kohler began charging an admission price of 25 cents per visit per person. That same year (1873), he also created and began selling a guidebook to the cave which described the various pillar and dripstone formations, stalactites, and stalagmites. In 1874, he purchased his stagecoach, using it to transport potential customers from region-wide train stations to the cave; he then also built a hotel in the spring of that year to house tourists closer to the site of the cave. Known as the Kohler Hotel, it was also nicknamed as the "Cave House."

On November 2, 1886, the aging Kohler sold the cave and its related operations to his son, David Kohler, for $4,300. After taking over, the younger Kohler and his wife purchased a liquor license for the hotel, and began holding hoedowns and other dances in the "Crystal Cave Ballroom."

In 1923, David Kohler sold Crystal Cave and its related operations to J. Douglas Kaufman, who operated the concern until selling it to his son, Douglas Kaufman, in 1972. Douglas Kaufman's daughter then assumed leadership of the organization, becoming its president in 2007. During their tenure, the Kaufman family added an ice cream parlor and restaurant, miniature golf course, nature trail, second gift shop, and theater. The cave was also used, at one time, for crop storage.

== Features of the cave ==
Crystal Cave measures 500 feet (150 m) long from its main entrance to its back of the cave. The lowest point, Devil's Den, is 155 feet (47 m) below the Earth's surface and in it used to live thirty to forty North American brown bats. Unfortunately the brown bats contracted white-nose syndrome and died. The highest point in the cave is 65 feet (20 m) below the Earth's surface, in an area that is called "Lookout Point" because it offers a view of two-thirds of the cave.

Some of the cave's rock formations are a half-million years old. One is called "The Upside-down Ice Cream Cone" due to the different-colored calcite deposits which look like vanilla ice cream and chocolate ice cream, along with moss and plant life that looks like mint ice cream. There is also an enormous drop rock that separates a room in two creating a natural bridge.

The cave remains at 52 °F (11 °C), 54 °F (12 °C), and 56 °F (13 °C) in different areas all year round.

== See also ==
- List of caves in the United States
