= Keisterville, Pennsylvania =

Unincorporated community in Pennsylvania, US

- Unincorporated community
- Location within Pennsylvania
- Coordinates: 39°57′41″N 79°46′57″W
- Country: United States
- State: Pennsylvania
- County: Fayette
- Elevation: 1,171 ft (357 m)
- Time zone: UTC-5 (Eastern (EST))
  - Summer (DST): UTC-4 (EDT)
- ZIP code: 15449
- Area codes: 724, 878
- GNIS feature ID: 1178308

Keisterville is an unincorporated community in Fayette County, Pennsylvania, United States. The community is located near Pennsylvania Route 43, 5.5 miles (8.9 km) northwest of Uniontown. Keisterville has a post office with ZIP code 15449.
