= Virginville, Pennsylvania =

Unincorporated community in Pennsylvania, US

- Census-designated place
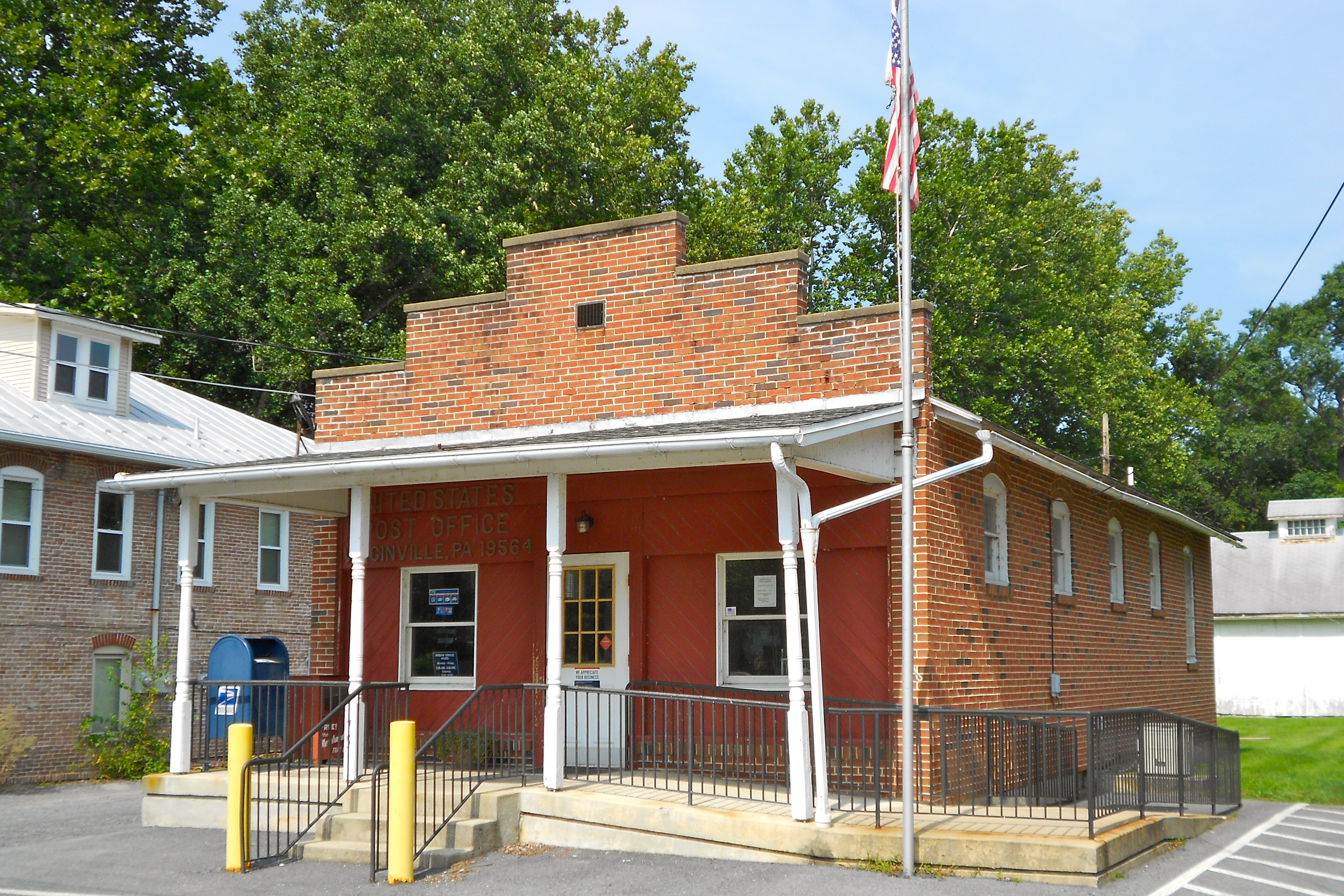
- Post Office

- Location within Pennsylvania Location within the United States
- Coordinates: 40°31′26″N 75°52′23″W
- Country: United States
- State: Pennsylvania
- County: Berks
- Township: Richmond
- Elevation: 335 ft (102 m)

Population (2010)
  - Total: 309
- Time zone: UTC-5 (Eastern (EST))
  - Summer (DST): UTC-4 (EDT)
- ZIP code: 19564
- Area codes: 610 and 484
- GNIS feature ID: 1190445

- Virginville Historic District
- U.S. National Register of Historic Places
- U.S. Historic district
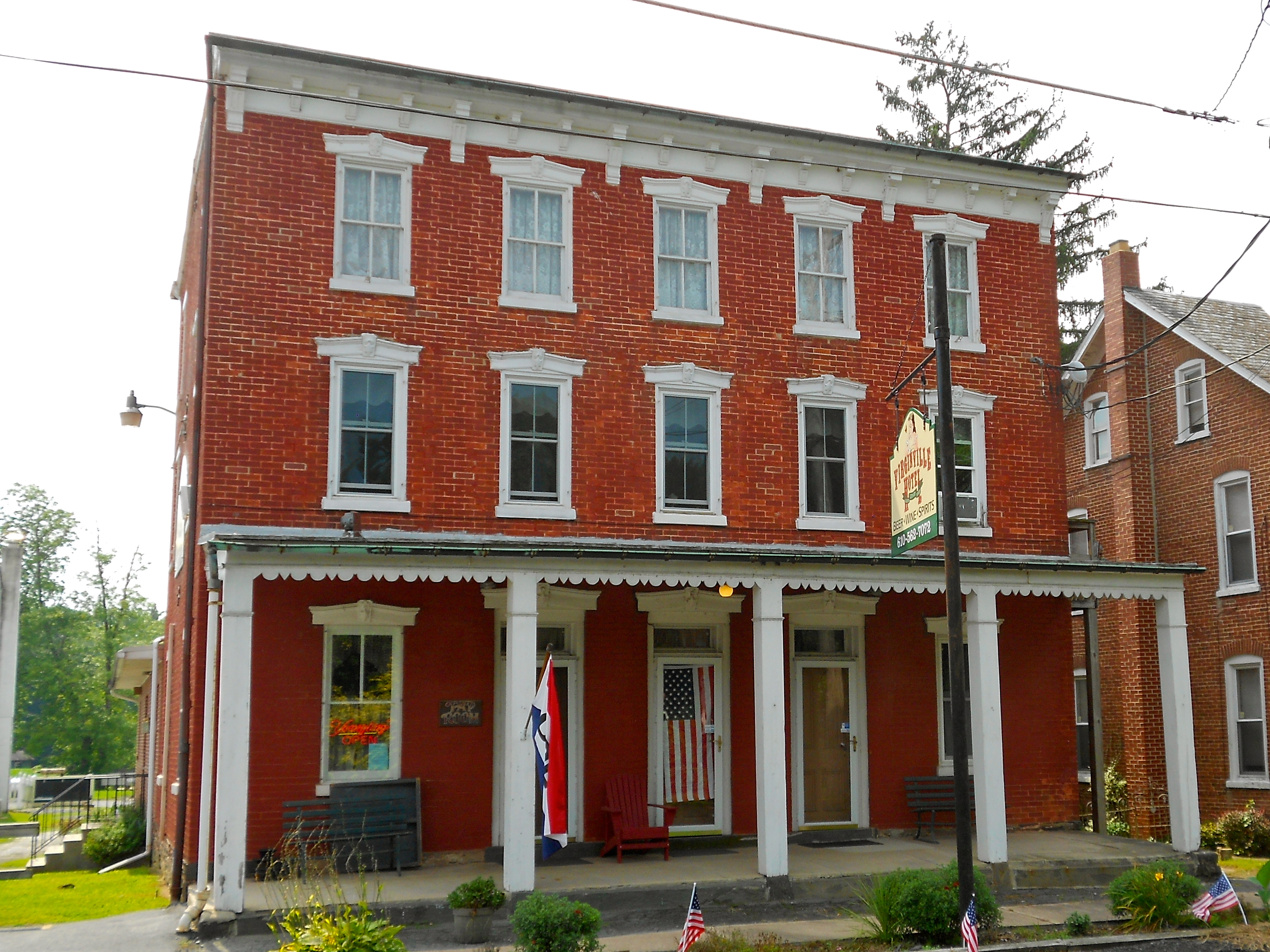
- The Virginville Hotel, part of the historic district

- Location within Pennsylvania Location within the United States
- Location: Main, 2nd, 1st, and Front Sts. and Chapel Dr. Richmond Township, Pennsylvania
- Area: 17.3 acres (7.0 ha)
- Built by: Dreibelbis, Francis; Heinly, Seth
- Architectural style: Gothic Revival, Italianate, et al.
- NRHP reference No.: 00001123
- Added to NRHP: September 28, 2000

Virginville is a census-designated place in Richmond Township, Berks County, Pennsylvania, United States. It is located at the junction of PA 143 and Crystal Ridge Road, and is approximately seven miles to the south of the borough of Lenhartsville.

The community was designated as the Virginville Historic District by the National Register of Historic Places in 2000.

As of the 2020 census, the population was 304 residents.

== History ==
The origin of the name Virginville is obscure. Some say it is the English translation of a Native American word, while others believe the community was named for virgin forests in the area. "Virgin" may be an alternate translation of the Indian-named Maiden Creek, which runs through the town and also meets up with Sacony Creek.

The district encompasses 290 contributing buildings built between 1874 and 2001 with residential, commercial, and institutional buildings which were constructed in a variety of popular architectural styles, including Gothic Revival and Italianate. A primarily residential district, notable non-residential buildings include The Creamery (c. 1875), St. Paul's Chapel (1903), Virginville Hotel (1885), post office (c. 1930), and Balthasar's Garage (1921).

== Population and demographics ==
As of the 2020 census, the population was 304 residents.

== Gallery ==
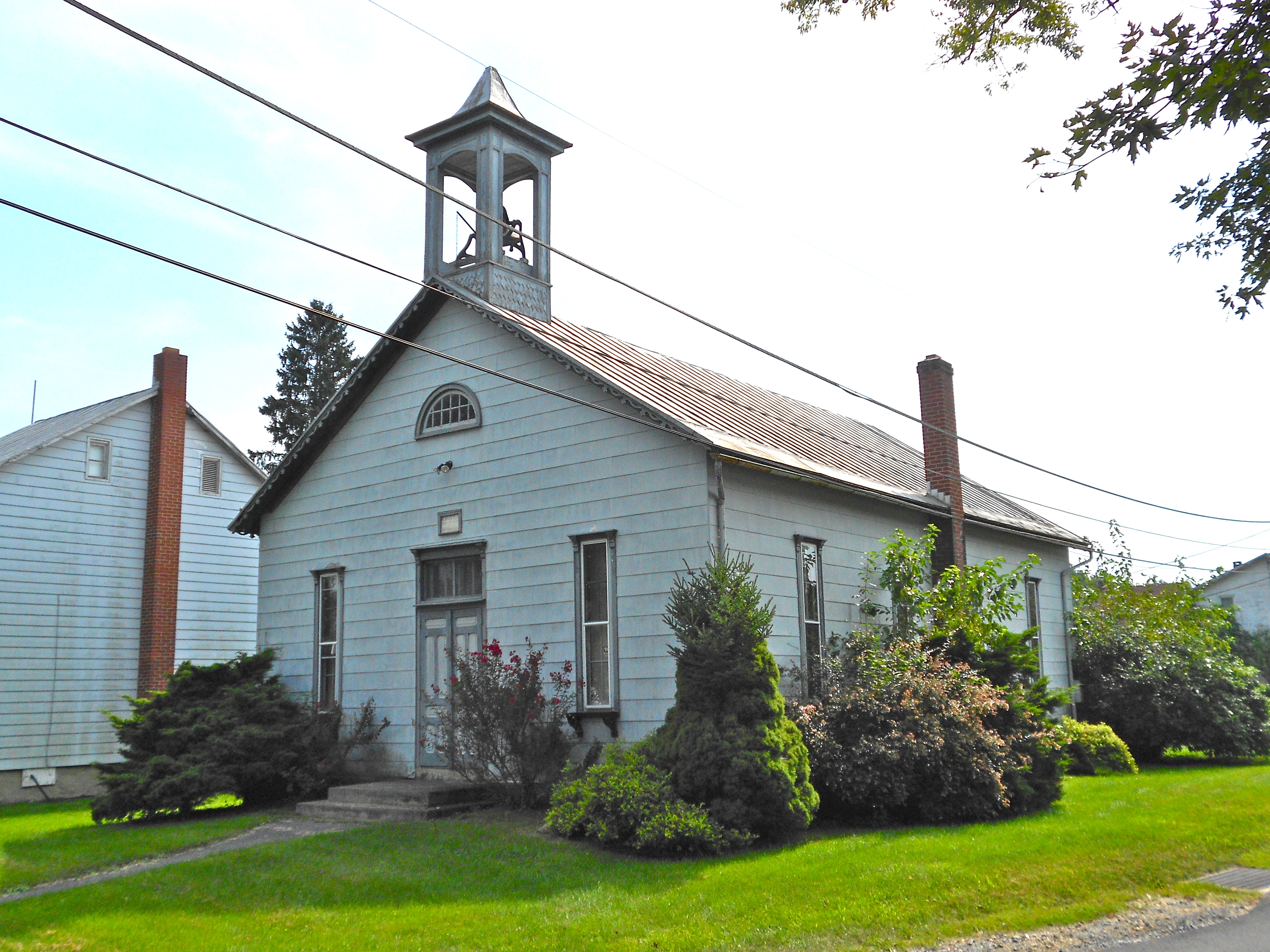
St. Paul's Chapel

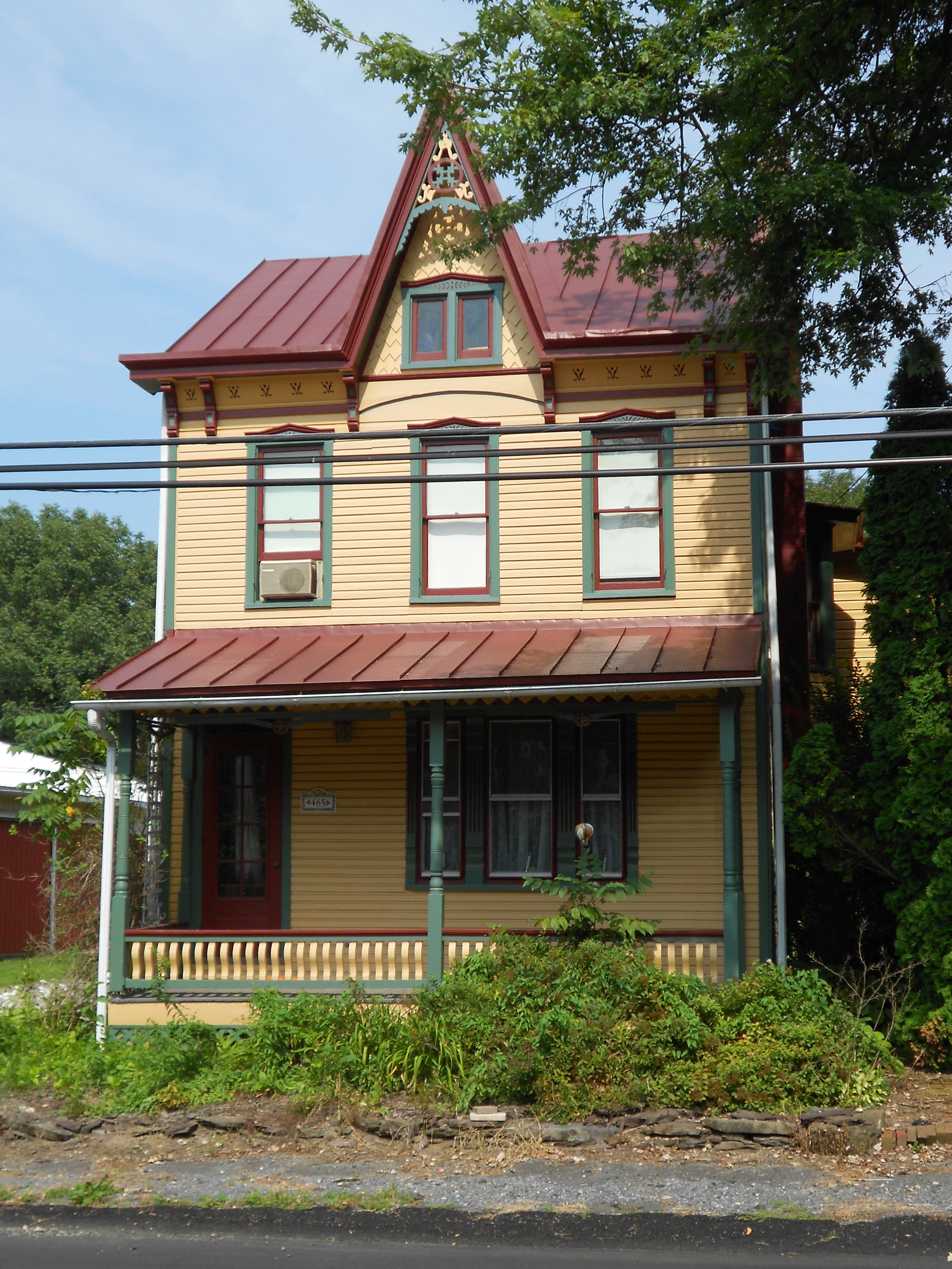
Gothic Revival style house

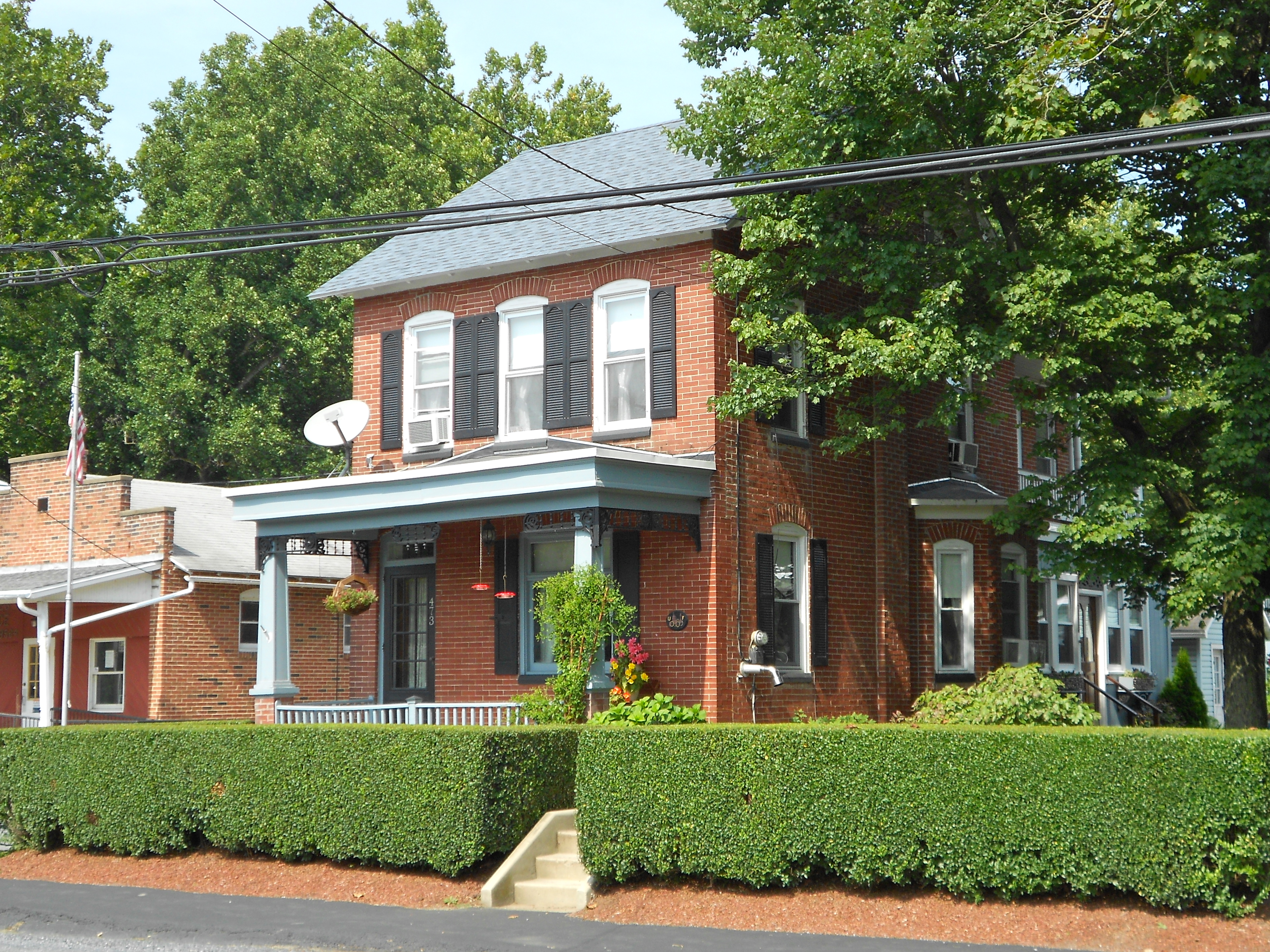
Vernacular brick house
