= Kirbyville, Pennsylvania =

Unincorporated community in Pennsylvania, US

- Unincorporated community
- Location within Pennsylvania Location within the United States
- Coordinates: 40°28′27″N 75°51′31″W
- Country: United States
- State: Pennsylvania
- County: Berks
- Township: Richmond
- Elevation: 423 ft (129 m)
- Time zone: UTC-5 (Eastern (EST))
  - Summer (DST): UTC-4 (EDT)
- ZIP code: 19522
- Area codes: 610 and 484
- GNIS feature ID: 1203944

Kirbyville is a village and unincorporated community located along U.S. Route 222 in Richmond Township, Berks County, Pennsylvania, United States. The village is located west of Moselem Springs, and approximately 10 minutes from Kutztown.

== History ==
Kirbyville takes its name from the Kirby family, who operated a farm in the village and were some of the earliest settlers in Richmond Township.

In 2017, the former Kirby family farm was purchased by three Mennonite farmers, who planned to open a 6,000-square-foot farmers market, to be called the Kirbyville Farm Market, by early 2019. The site's original bank barn, which was constructed by the Kirby family approximately 200 years ago, is being restored and renovated to house the new farmers market.
