= Kishacoquillas, Pennsylvania =

Unincorporated community in Pennsylvania, U.S.

Coordinates: 40°38′15″N 77°39′45″W

Kishacoquillas is an unincorporated community in Mifflin County, in the U.S. state of Pennsylvania.

== History ==
A post office called Kishacoquillas was established in 1834, and remained in operation until it was discontinued in 1914. The community was named for a Native American chieftain.
