= Kerrmoor, Pennsylvania =

Unincorporated community in Pennsylvania, U.S.

Coordinates: 40°53′33″N 78°34′55″W

Kerrmoor is an unincorporated community in Clearfield County, in the U.S. state of Pennsylvania.

== History ==
The name "Kerrmoor" is an amalgamation of Kerr and Moore, the surnames of first settlers.
