= Berks Area Regional Transportation Authority =

Public transportation system serving Berks County, Penn., US

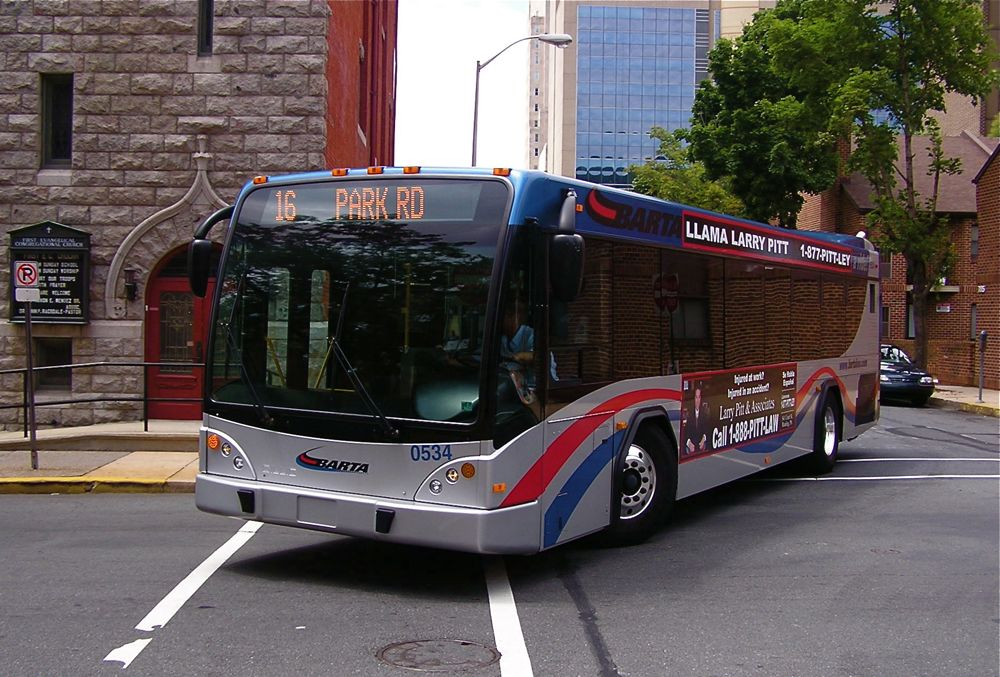
- BARTA bus 0534 in downtown Reading on the Route 16 line
- Founded: October 8, 1973
- Headquarters: 1700 North 11th Street; Reading, Pennsylvania, U.S.
- Service area: Berks County, Pennsylvania
- Service type: Public Transit
- Routes: 20
- Hubs: BARTA Transportation Center; Reading, Pennsylvania
- Fleet: 50 buses
- Daily ridership: 14,300 (weekdays, Q2 2026)
- Annual ridership: 2,253,300 (2025)
- Fuel type: Diesel, hybrid diesel electric
- Website: bartabus.com

Berks Area Regional Transportation Authority (BARTA), previously Berks Area Reading Transportation Authority, is a public transportation system serving the city of Reading and its surrounding area of Berks County, Pennsylvania. South Central Transit Authority (SCTA) oversees BARTA and the Red Rose Transit Authority (RRTA). In 2025, the system had a ridership of 2,253,300, or about 14,300 per weekday as of the second quarter of 2026.

== History ==
=== 20th century ===
BARTA was created with the cooperation of the Berks County and the City of Reading in 1973 to purchase the failing Reading Bus Company. On October 8, 1973, BARTA began bus operations. The BARTA Special Services paratransit service was formed in 1978 when 33 social service agencies in Berks County consolidated their transportation systems.

In 1992, BARTA became the first small public transit agency in the United States to use Compressed Natural Gas (CNG) buses. A grant from the Federal Transit Administration in 1993 allowed BARTA to eliminate the pedestrian mall along Penn Street in downtown Reading and reopen the road to traffic. As part of this, Penn Street between 4th and 6th streets was restored and bus shelters and berths were built.

=== 21st century ===
The BARTA Transportation Center at 7th and Cherry streets opened in 2002 to serve as a hub for BARTA buses.

In 2005, the BARTA Park-N-Transit garage with 350 parking spaces opened at 7th and Franklin streets. The same year, a new logo for BARTA and paint scheme for buses was introduced. The agency also started investing in electric-diesel hybrid buses. In 2010, BARTA became a county authority, overseen by the County of Berks, reflecting its focus on regionalism instead of centralism on the city of Reading. The former Reading Railroad Franklin Street Station was refurbished and reopened to bus service on September 9, 2013.

In September 2013, BARTA expanded its service on a trial basis to Lebanon with connecting service on Lebanon Transit to Harrisburg. This service replaced previously abandoned coach service operated by Bieber Tourways, on July 1, 2013. However, BARTA discontinued its service to Lebanon on January 31, 2014, due to low ridership.

Dennis D. Louwerse, the long-time executive director and CEO at BARTA, died on Thursday, September 5, 2013, at the age of 68. He became the executive director at BARTA in 1983, and he was the executive director for 30 years until his death. David W. Kilmer is currently the executive director. On December 1, 2014, the South Central Transit Authority was formed to oversee BARTA and the Red Rose Transit Authority (RRTA) in Lancaster County.

== Timeline ==
- October 8, 1973: Berks Area Reading Transportation Authority was founded, after the City of Reading and the County of Berks purchased the failing Reading Bus Company.
- 1978: BARTA Special Services was founded, after Berks County Commissioners ordered 33 social service agencies in Berks County consolidated their transportation systems.
- May 1983: BARTA was facing financial difficulties. Dennis D. Louwerse had then become BARTA's executive director, and kept BARTA up and running for service.
- 1992: BARTA became the first small authority in the U.S. to use CNG (Compressed Natural Gas) buses.
- 1993: BARTA received a grant from the FTA (Federal Transportation Administration) to reconstruct the pedestrian mall, Penn Square, on Penn Street from 4th Street to 6th Street. BARTA had then added eight bus shelters, at 5th Street and Penn Street.
- March 4, 2002: The BARTA Transportation Center (BTC) was opened, 0.1 miles away from the Franklin Street Station. This bus terminal had a waiting area, restrooms, a customer service/sales window, and a break area for bus drivers.
- 2005: BARTA decided to longer purchase CNG buses, as they were no longer cost-effective.These buses were then sold to EMTA and IndiGo.
- August 27, 2005: The BARTA Park-n-Transit Facility was opened, a 350-space garage. BARTA also rebranded to a red, blue, and black scheme, along with a new logo, and new bus routes. BARTA also began investing into electric-diesel hybrid buses.
- 2009: BARTA purchased 5 HEV (Hybrid-Electric Vehicle) buses.
- July 2010: BARTA had then become a county authority, and renamed to Berks Area Regional Transportation Authority.
- 2013: BARTA completed restoration to the former Franklin Street Street Station, planned to be used as a bus terminal.
- September 5, 2013: The Executive Director of BARTA, Dennis D. Louwerse, had died. David W. Kilmer then became Executive Director of BARTA.
- September 9, 2013: BARTA began trial service to Harrisburg, with connecting service with Lebanon Transit.
- 2014: BARTA began facing financial difficulties, and RRTA agreed to help BARTA.
- January 31, 2014: BARTA had discontinued the trial route to Harrisburg via Lebanon, due to low ridership.
- December 4, 2014: BARTA and RRTA became subsidiaries to South Central Transit Authority (SCTA). SCTA was founded by the County of Berks and the County of Lancaster.

== Current Routes ==
BARTA operates most of its present route network on a hub and spoke type system, in which most passengers transfer between routes at a central location, the BARTA Transportation Center.

Effective January 5, 2026

Route	Line Name	Terminals		Places Served	Notes
1	Temple via Fifth Street	BARTA Transportation Center	Walmart at North Reading Plaza	5th Street, 5th Street Highway, Fairgrounds Square Mall, Penn Plaza, Plaza 222, Muhlenberg Shopping Center, Target, Temple	operates Monday-Sunday
2	Fairgrounds Square Market	BARTA Transportation Center	Fairgrounds Square Market	9th Street/10th Street, Exeter Street, 11th Street, Rockland Street, Kutztown Road, Madison Avenue, 5th Street Highway, Fairgrounds Square Mall	operates Friday-Saturday
3	Temple via Kutztown Road	BARTA Transportation Center	Walmart at North Reading Plaza	8th Street/9th Street, Kutztown Road, Temple	operates Monday-Saturday
4	10th/11th Streets	BARTA Transportation Center	10th and Exeter streets	Penn Street, 11th Street, Rockland Plaza, 10th Street	operates Monday-Sunday
5	Albright College	BARTA Transportation Center	Reservoir Road and Hampden Boulevard	12th Street/13th Street, Reading Senior High School, Weis Market, Albright College, Hampden Boulevard, Elite Sportswear, U.S. Post Office	operates Monday-Saturday
7	Pennside	BARTA Transportation Center	Stony Creek Towne Houses	Penn Street, Perkiomen Avenue, 23rd Street, Carsonia Avenue, Hollywood Court Apartments, Pennside, Butter Lane	operates Monday-Saturday
8	Reiffton/Shelbourne Square/Birdsboro	BARTA Transportation Center	Walmart at Exeter Square or Birdsboro	Penn Street, Perkiomen Avenue, Reiffton, Boscov's at Reading Mall, Exeter Commons, U.S. Route 422, Redner's at Shelbourne Square Park and Ride, Walmart at Exeter Square, Lincoln Road	operates Monday-Sunday, limited weekday service to Birdsboro
9	Grill via Kenhorst	BARTA Transportation Center	Redner's at Kenhorst Plaza	4th Street, South Reading, KVP Factory, Alvernia University, Sencit Towne House Apartments, Kenhorst, Grill	operates Monday-Saturday
10	Brookline	BARTA Transportation Center	East Wyomissing Boulevard and Margaret Street	4th Street/6th Street, South Reading, Lancaster Avenue, Brookline Plaza, Hancock Boulevard, Shillington Plaza Shopping Center	operates Monday-Sunday
11	Mohnton via Shillington	BARTA Transportation Center	Main and Church streets in Mohnton	4th Street, South Reading, Lancaster Avenue, Shillington Shopping Center, Shillington, Ollie's Bargain Outlet/Fulton Bank, Wyomissing Avenue	operates Monday-Saturday
12	Lincoln Park via Reading Hospital	BARTA Transportation Center	Berkshire Hills	Penn Street, Penn Avenue, West Reading, Reading Hospital, Reading Boulevard, The Highlands at Wyomissing, Lincoln Plaza Shopping Center, Spring Towne Center	operates Monday-Saturday
14	Wernersville via Sinking Spring	BARTA Transportation Center	Wernersville State Hospital or McDonald's Park and Ride in Womelsdorf	Penn Street, Penn Avenue, West Reading, Sinking Spring, Redner's at Sinking Spring Plaza, U.S. Route 422, Phoebe Berks Village, Wernersville	operates Monday-Saturday, limited service to Womelsdorf
15	Berkshire Mall	BARTA Transportation Center	Walmart at Berkshire Square or Giant on State Hill Road	Penn Street, Penn Avenue, West Reading, State Hill Road, Berkshire Mall, Walmart at Berkshire Square	operates Monday-Sunday, most Sunday service terminates at Walmart at Berkshire Square
16	Broadcasting Square	BARTA Transportation Center	Target at Broadcasting Square	Penn Street, Penn Avenue, West Reading, Park Road, Penn State Berks, R.M. Palmer Company	operates Monday-Sunday
17	Glenside/Airport/Berks Heim	BARTA Transportation Center	Penn State Health St. Joseph or Berks Heim	Schuylkill Avenue, Bernville Road, Reading Regional Airport, MacArthur Road	operates Monday-Saturday, limited service to Berks Heim
18	Schuylkill Avenue	BARTA Transportation Center	Windsor Street and Schuylkill Avenue or Penn State Health St. Joseph	Downtown Reading, Penn Street, Front Street, Windsor Street, Schuylkill Avenue	operates Monday-Sunday, limited evening service to Penn State Health St. Joseph
19	Riverside/FirstEnergy Stadium/Cotton Street	19th and Cotton streets	FirstEnergy Stadium Park and Ride	Cotton Street/Perkiomen Avenue, Downtown Reading, BARTA Transportation Center, 6th Street/8th Street, PriceRite, Spring Street, Riverside School, Centre Avenue, Amazon Fulfillment Center	operates Monday-Sunday, no Sunday service between BARTA Transportation Center and FirstEnergy Stadium
20	Route 61/Hamburg	BARTA Transportation Center	Cabela's	Centre Avenue, Pennsylvania Route 61, Redner's Leesport Park and Ride, Leesport, Shoemakersville, Redner's Hamburg Park and Ride, Hamburg	operates Monday-Saturday
22	Lyon Station/East Penn-Deka	BARTA Transportation Center	East Penn Manufacturing Company-Deka in Lyons	8th Street/9th Street, Kutztown Road, U.S. Route 222 Business, Park Road, Blandon, Fleetwood, Fleetwood-Lyons Road, Kutztown, Kutztown University	operates Monday-Friday

== Inactive Routes ==
=== 1984 Routes (1984-???) ===
- Route 2: Schuylkill Avenue
- Route 2A: Ninth Street
- Route 3: Mohnton
- Route 3A: Kutztown Road
- Route 3A: Laureldale
- Route 4: Hampden Boulevard
- Route 4A: Berkshire Heights
- Route 6: Lincoln Park
- Route 6A: Reading Hospital
- Route 7: Glenside - Airport
- Route 7A: Kenhorst-Grill
- Route 8: Reiffton
- Route 9: Brookline
- Route 10: Jacksonwald
- Route 12: Sinking Spring
- Route 12A: Wernersville
- Route 14: West Lawn
- Route 14A: Berkshire Mall
- Route 16: Stony Creek
- Route 18: Pennside - Butter Lane
- Route 18A: Pennside - Hollywood Court
- Route 20: Cotton Street
- Route 20A: Riverside
- Route 20A: Riverview Park
- Route 22: Eleventh Street
- Route 22A: Albright College
- Route 24: Birdsboro
- Route 27: Green Hills
- Route 28: Spring Township
- Route 30: Fairgrounds Square via Madeira Plaza - Fairgrounds Market
- Express - Giorgio Foods
- Express - Berks Heim
- Express - Western Electric

=== 2004 Routes (Nov 30) (2004-Aug 27, 2005) ===
- Route 1N: Temple/Kutztown Road/Laureldale
- Route 1S: Shillington/Mohnton
- Route 2E: Ninth Street
- Route 2W: Schuylkill Avenue
- Route 4E/W: Hampden Boulevard/Berkshire Heights
- Route 6W: Lincoln Park/Reading Hospital
- Route 7N: Glenside/Airport
- Route 7S: Kenhorst/Grill
- Route 8E: Reiffton/Reading Mall/Shelbourne Square
- Route 9S: Brookline
- Route 10E: Jacksonwald
- Route 12W: Sinking Spring/Wernersville
- Route 14W: Berkshire Mall
- Route 16E: Stony Creek
- Route 18E: Pennside/Butter Lane/Hollywood Court
- Route 20N: Riverside
- Route 20S: Cotton Street
- Route 22N: Albright College/11th Street/12th Street
- Route 28W: Spring Township
- Spring Ridge Loop/Target
- Berks Heim Express #3
- Niteline
- Park-N-Ride Shuttle - First Energy Stadium
- Park-N-Ride Shuttle - Shelbourne Square
- Park-N-Ride Shuttle - Womelsdorf
- Route 61/Cabela's
- Morgantown (Monday-Friday)

=== 2005 Routes (August 27, 2025) (Aug 27, 2005 - Present) ===
- Route 1: Temple via 5th Street (Aug 27, 2005 - present)
- Route 2: Fairgrounds Square Market (Aug 27, 2005 - present)
- Route 3: Temple via Kutztown Road (Aug 27, 2005 - present)
- Route 4: 10th/11th Streets (Aug 27, 2005 - present)
- Route 5: Albright College (Aug 27, 2005 - present)
- Route 6: Spring Street/Berkshire Heights Crosstown (Aug 27, 2005 - Aug 24, 2015)
- Route 7: Pennside (Aug 27, 2005 - present)
- Route 8: Reiffton/Shelbourne Square (Aug 27, 2005 - Jan 1, 2012) Reiffton/Shelbourne Square/Birdsboro (Jan 1, 2012 - present)
- Route 9: Grill via Kenhorst (Aug 27, 2005 - present)
- Route 10: Brookline (Aug 27, 2005 - present)
- Route 11: Mohnton via Shillington (Aug 27, 2005 - present)
- Route 12: Lincoln Park via Reading Hospital (Aug 27, 2005 - present)
- Route 13: Spring Township (Aug 27, 2005 - Feb 25, 2007)
- Route 14: Wernersville via Sinking Spring (Aug 27, 2005 - Jan 1, 2012) Wernersville/Sinking Spring/Womelsdorf (Jan 1, 2012 - present)
- Route 15: Berkshire Mall (Aug 27, 2005 - present)
- Route 16: Broadcasting Square/Berkshire Mall (Aug 27, 2005 - Aug 28, 2017) Broadcasting Square (Aug 28, 2017 - present)
- Route 17: Glenside/Airport/Berks Heim (Aug 27, 2005 - present)
- Route 18: Schuylkill Avenue (Aug 27, 2005 - present)
- Route 19: Riverside/FirstEnergy Stadium/Cotton Street (Aug 27, 2005 - present)
- Route 20: Route 61/Hamburg (Aug 27, 2005 - present)
- Route 21: Morgantown Express (Aug 27, 2005 - Jan 2, 2017)
- Route 22: Lyon Station/East Penn-Deka (Feb 25, 2007 - present)
- Route 23: Lebanon (Sep 9, 2013 - Jan 31, 2014)

== Fares ==
January 9, 2023
Fare/Pass	Price
Adult Cash Fare	$1.80
Student Cash Fare	$1.00
Transfers	No Charge
Disabled Fare	$0.90
Children 5 & under ride for...	FREE
All Day Anywhere Pass	All Day Pass - $3.70
All Day Anywhere Pass	All Day Pass - $4.00
10 Ride Pass	Adult Anywhere - $13.50
10 Ride Pass	Student Anywhere - $9.00
Half-Fare 10 Ride Pass	$6.75
31 Day Pass	Adult Anywhere - $45.00
31 Day Pass	Student Anywhere - $20.00

== Transit Facilities ==
=== BARTA Transportation Center ===
The BARTA Transportation Center is located at 7th and Cherry streets in Downtown Reading and is where all BARTA bus routes connect. The transportation center has an enclosed waiting area, restrooms, customer service office, a break area for bus drivers, a community police station, and a 101-space parking garage. The BARTA Transportation Center has ten berths that the buses stop at and announces arriving and departing buses over the PA system and through information displays in the waiting and loading areas.

=== Franklin Street Station ===
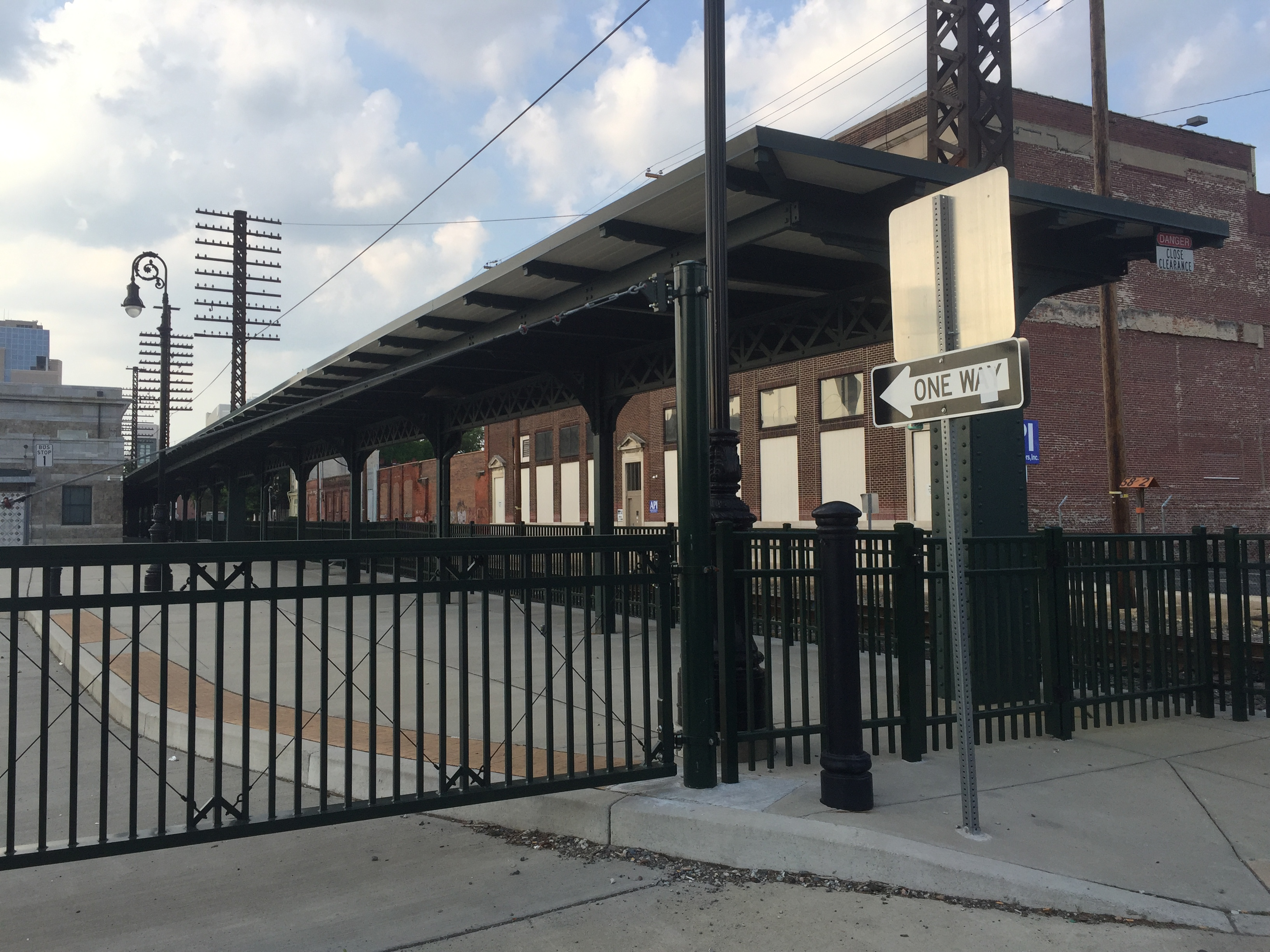
Reading Franklin Street Terminal was converted to a bus terminal in 2013. Buses enter from Chestnut Street.

The former Reading Railroad Franklin Street Station was refurbished and also has bus service. The station has a waiting area for passengers, customer service area, transportation museum, and space for passenger amenities. The station is intended to be used for future express and long-distance bus services.

=== Park and ride locations ===
BARTA operates five park and ride lots across Berks County:

- FirstEnergy Stadium (Route 19)
- Redner's in Hamburg (Route 20)
- Redner's in Leesport (Route 20)
- Shelbourne Square in Exeter Township (Route 8)
- Womelsdorf (Route 14)

== BARTA's Fleet ==
BARTA's fleet consists of 50 buses, consisting primarily of hybrid electric buses, which include Gillig BRT hybrids and Gillig Low Floor Plus hybrids. BARTA's fixed route fleet was mostly buses powered by Detroit Diesel engines until the production of the Detroit Diesel Series 50 was cut in late 2004. Then BARTA ordered their 05, 07, 08 and 09 Gillig BRTs with Cummins ISL. The first 2 digits of the bus numbers indicate the year the bus was ordered. All of BARTA's buses from 2010 and earlier, which have been retired, were equipped with Allison. All the buses have Bendix air brakes. As of 2009, BARTA has received Gillig BRT hybrids with Cummins ISB, Cummins ISB6.7 and Cummins B6.7 AND L9 engines. In 2009 and 2010, BARTA received 9 Gillig BRT hybrids with the Allison EP-40 hybrid drive system. As of 2015, BARTA has received additional Gillig BRT hybrids, which are series hybrids equipped with BAE Systems HybriDrive Series-E. Fewer passengers have been riding the bus due to COVID-19 so there are fewer active buses in the fleet.

=== Fixed-Route Bus Fleet ===
==== Current fleet ====
Fleet number(s)	Year	Manufacturer	Model	Engine	Transmission	Notes
1542-1544	2015	Gillig	BRT HEV 40'	Cummins ISB6.7	BAE HybriDrive Series-E hybrid system	
1605–1608	2016	Gillig	BRT HEV 40'	Cummins ISB6.7	BAE HybriDrive Series-E hybrid system	
1801–1805	2017	Gillig	BRT HEV 35'	Cummins B6.7	BAE HybriDrive Series-E hybrid system	
1806–1807	2018	Gillig	BRT HEV 40'	Cummins B6.7	BAE HybriDrive Series-E hybrid system	
1808–1812	2018	Gillig	BRT HEV 35'	Cummins B6.7	BAE HybriDrive Series-E hybrid system	
1901–1905	2019	Gillig	BRT HEV 35'	Cummins B6.7	BAE HybriDrive Series-E hybrid system	
1912–1918	2019	Gillig	BRT HEV 35'	Cummins B6.7	BAE HybriDrive Series-E hybrid system	
2001–2002	2020	Gillig	BRT HEV 40'	Cummins B6.7	BAE HybriDrive Series-E hybrid system	
2003–2006	2020	Gillig	BRT HEV 35'	Cummins B6.7	BAE HybriDrive Series-E hybrid system	
2104-2107	2021	Gillig	Low Floor Plus HEV 35'	Cummins B6.7	BAE HybriDrive Series-E hybrid system	
2201-2205	2022	Gillig	Low Floor Plus HEV 40'	Cummins L9	BAE HybriDrive Series-E hybrid system	
2301-2304	2023	Gillig	Low Floor Plus HEV 40'	Cummins L9	BAE HybriDrive Series-E hybrid system	

==== Retired Fleet ====
Fleet number(s)	Year	Manufacturer	Model	Engine	Transmission	Notes
901-944	1975	GMC	T6H-4523A	Detroit Diesel 6V71N	Allison	
960-963	1981	Flxible		Detroit Diesel 6V71T	Allison V730	
964-968	1983	Neoplan	AN-440A	Detroit Diesel 6V92TA	Allison HT-747	
969	1981	Neoplan	AN-460A	Detroit Diesel 8V92TA 381 hp	Allison HT-740D	Ex-Neoplan USA Articulated Bus Prototype/Demonstrator.
1952	1989	Spartan	?			Trolley replica.
8901-8910	1989	Orion	01.505	Detroit Diesel 6V92TA	Allison HTB-748	
8911-8915	1989	Orion	01.507	Detroit Diesel 6V92TA	Allison HTB-748	
9001-9011	1990	Orion	01.505	Detroit Diesel 6V92TA	Allison HTB-748	9005 was an Ex-BIA demo.
9012-9016	1990	Orion	01.507	Detroit Diesel 6V92TA	Allison HTB-748	
9101-9112	1991	Gillig	3596TB6V92TA	Detroit Diesel 6V92TA	Allison HTB-748	
9113	1991	Chance	?			Trolley replica.
9201	1992	Orion	05.501 CNG	Cummins L10G	Allison B400R	
9301	1993	Chance	?			Trolley replica.
9401-9402	1994	TMC	T80-206	Detroit Diesel Series 50		
9403	1995	Orion	05.501 CNG	Detroit Diesel Series 50G	Allison B400R	To Erie Metropolitan Transit Authority 9403.
9601	1996	Orion	05.501 CNG	Detroit Diesel Series 50G	Allison B400R	
9602-9606	1996	New Flyer	C40LF	Detroit Diesel Series 50G	Allison B400R	9602, 9604 to IndiGo 602, 604.; 9603, to Erie Metropolitan Transit Authority 9603, .; CNG powered.
9801-9804	1998	Orion	02.501	Cummins B5.9G	Allison AT-545	to IndiGo .; CNG powered.
0301-0305	2003	Optima	Opus	Cummins ISB02	Allison B300R	0301 was a "wrap" bus with a UPMC ad.; 0304 - was lost due to a fire on January 21, 2008.
0321-0323	2003	New Flyer	D40LF	Detroit Diesel Series 50 EGR	Allison B400R	to Indian Trails 44-46.
0406-0410	2004	Optima	Opus	Cummins ISB	Allison	0406, 0408 & 0409 to County of Lackawanna Transit System in 2017 to fill gaps in shortage of buses.; To Milewski's Auto Parts in 2018; 0410 donated to Reading Muhlenberg Career & Technology Center vocational-technical school for hands-on training in December 2016.
0431-0432	2004	Gillig	Low Floor 40'	Detroit Diesel Series 50 EGR	Allison B400R	Retired in 2018.
0533-0549	2005	Gillig	BRT 35'	Cummins ISL	Allison B400R	Began retiring in 2018.
0750-0756	2007	Gillig	BRT 35'	Cummins ISL	Allison B400R	Began retiring in 2019.; 0756 to AppalCART B28 in 2020.
0857-0862	2008	Gillig	BRT 35'	Cummins ISL	Allison B400R	0857, 0861 to ShuttleBus 857, 861 in 2020, 2021.; 0858 to AppalCART B27 in 2020.
0881-0882	2008	Gillig	BRT 40'	Cummins ISL	Allison B400R	
0983-0984	2009	Gillig	BRT 40'	Cummins ISL	Allison B400R	
0991-0995	2009	Gillig	BRT 40' HEV	Cummins ISL	Allison EP40 hybrid system	
1096-1099	2010	Gillig	BRT 40' HEV	Cummins ISL9	Allison EP40 hybrid system	

=== Paratransit Fleet ===
==== Current fleet ====
Fleet number(s)	Year	Manufacturer	Model	Engine	Transmission	Notes
2025-2031	2020	Ford/Coach & Equipment	E-450/Phoenix			
2032-2040	2020	Ford/Coach & Equipment	E-450/Phoenix			Operated by Easton Coach
2120-2124	2021	Ford/Coach & Equipment	E-450/Phoenix			Operated by Easton Coach
2125-2127	2021	Ford/Coach & Equipment	E-450/Phoenix			
2314-2320	2023	Ford/Coach & Equipment	E-450/Phoenix			
2403-2414	2024	Ford/Coach & Equipment	E-450/Phoenix			
2430-2440	2024	Ford/Coach & Equipment	E-450/Phoenix			

==== Retired Fleet ====
Fleet number(s)	Year	Manufacturer	Model	Engine	Transmission	Notes
EC216-EC218	2002	Ford/?	E450 cutaway	Ford Power Stroke 7.3L Diesel		
0351-0359	2003	International CE300	Condor	Navistar DT466E		
0460-0465	2004	International CE300	Condor	Navistar DT466E		#0464 VIN 1HVBTAAL84H674462.
EC595	2005	Ford/?	E450 cutaway	Ford Power Stroke 6.0L Diesel		#EC595 VIN 1FDXE45P15HB38695.
0666-0682	2006	Ford/C&E	E450/?	Ford Power Stroke 6.0L Diesel		
0883-0887	2008	Ford/C&E	E450/?	Ford Power Stroke 6.0L Diesel		
1088-1090	2010	Ford/C&E	E450/Phoenix	Ford Power Stroke 6.0L Diesel		
1101-1119	2010	Ford/C&E	E450/Phoenix	Ford V10 6.8L gasoline		
1131-1136	2011	Ford/C&E	E450/Phoenix	Ford V10 6.8L gasoline		
1237-1241	2012	Ford/C&E	E450/Phoenix	Ford V10 6.8L gasoline		Equipped with VTM Ultra Capacitor Hybrid Propulsion System.; 1238, returned to gasoline.
1301-1302	2013	Ford/C&E	E450/Phoenix			Converted to electric by Amp Electric Vehicles.
1401-1403	2014	Ford	E350		5 Speed EOD Automatic	Raised Roof Paratransit Vans operated by Easton Coach; Flexible-fuel vehicles
1404-1409	2014	Ford/Champion	E450/Challenger		5 Speed EOD Automatic	Operated by Easton Coach
1410-1416	2014	Ford/C&E	E450/Phoenix	Ford V10 6.8L gasoline		Equipped with VTM Ultra Capacitor Hybrid Propulsion System.
1517-1519	2015	Ford/Champion	E450/Challenger			Operated by Easton Coach
1546-1548	2015	Ford/Champion	E450/Challenger	6.8L V10 SOHC 20V Gasoline Engine	5 Speed EOD Automatic	Unleaded gasoline powered.; 1546 VIN: 1FDFE4FS7GDC18852.
1649-1655	2016	Ford/Champion	E450/Challenger	6.8L V-10 Gasoline	Automatic, 5R110W Torque Shift	
1756-1767	2017	Ford/Champion	E450/Challenger	6.8L V-10 Gasoline	Automatic, 5R110W Torque Shift	
1868-1878	2018	Ford/Startrans	E450/Senator II	6.8L V-10 Gasoline	Automatic, 5R110W Torque Shift	

== Paratransit ==
The BARTA Special Services Division provides Shared Ride bus service offering consolidated trips between customers’ origins and destinations that are not well served by fixed route bus service. Often referred to as “Paratransit,” Shared Ride operates during limited hours and specific travel areas.
