= Walnuttown, Pennsylvania =

Unincorporated community in Pennsylvania, US

- Census-designated place
- Location within Pennsylvania Location within the United States
- Coordinates: 40°26′58″N 75°50′34″W
- Country: United States
- State: Pennsylvania
- County: Berks
- Township: Maidencreek and Richmond

Population (2010)
  - Total: 484
- Time zone: UTC-5 (Eastern (EST))
  - Summer (DST): UTC-4 (EDT)
- ZIP code: 19522
- Area codes: 610 & 484

Walnuttown is a census-designated place in Berks County, Pennsylvania, United States. It is mainly in Richmond Township but also in Maidencreek Township. It is a short distance west of Fleetwood and south of U.S. Route 222. Willow Creek flows west through the CDP into Maiden Creek, just east of the latter's mouth into the Schuylkill River. Walnuttown is served by the Fleetwood post office, which uses the ZIP code of 19522. As of the 2010 census, the population of Walnuttown was 484. It is served by the Fleetwood Area School District.
