= FirstEnergy Stadium (disambiguation) =

Huntington Bank Field, known as FirstEnergy Stadium from 2013 to 2023, is an American football stadium in Cleveland, Ohio, and home of the Cleveland Browns of the National Football League.

FirstEnergy Stadium may also refer to:

- FirstEnergy Stadium (Reading, Pennsylvania), a baseball stadium in Reading, Pennsylvania, and home of the Reading Fightin' Phils minor league baseball team
- FirstEnergy Stadium–Cub Cadet Field, the soccer stadium at the University of Akron in Akron, Ohio
- FirstEnergy Park, a baseball stadium in Lakewood, New Jersey, home of the Lakewood Blue Claws minor league baseball team
