= Allentown Portland Cement Company =

Cement manufacturer in Portland, OR

Allentown Portland Cement Company was a manufacturer of Portland and mortar cement.

The firm was founded in 1906 and completed its first plant in Evansville, Pennsylvania, in 1910. In 1953 it acquired Valley Forge Cement Company, and in 1960 it was itself acquired by National Gypsum Company.
