= Evansville, Pennsylvania =

Unincorporated community in Pennsylvania, U.S.

Coordinates: 40°28′33″N 75°53′41″W

Evansville
- Unincorporated community
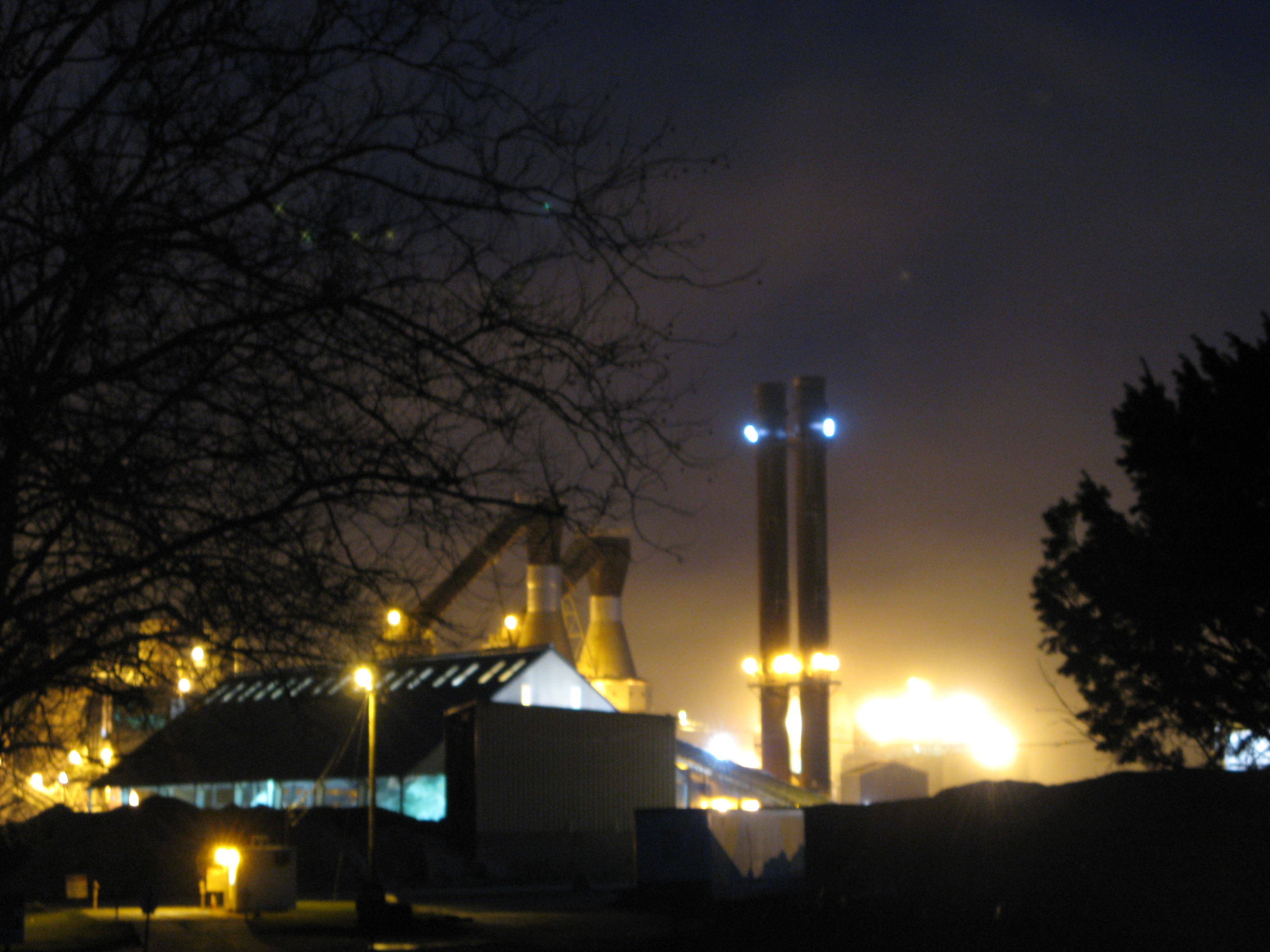
- Interactive map of Evansville
- Country: United States
- State: Pennsylvania
- County: Berks
- Township: Maidencreek
- Time zone: UTC−5 (Eastern Time Zone)
  - Summer (DST): UTC−4 (EDT)

Evansville is an unincorporated community in Berks County, Pennsylvania, United States. It is located along the shores of Ontelaunee Lake in Maidencreek Township and is served by the Fleetwood Area School District.
