= Shoemakersville, Pennsylvania =

Borough in Pennsylvania, US

- Borough
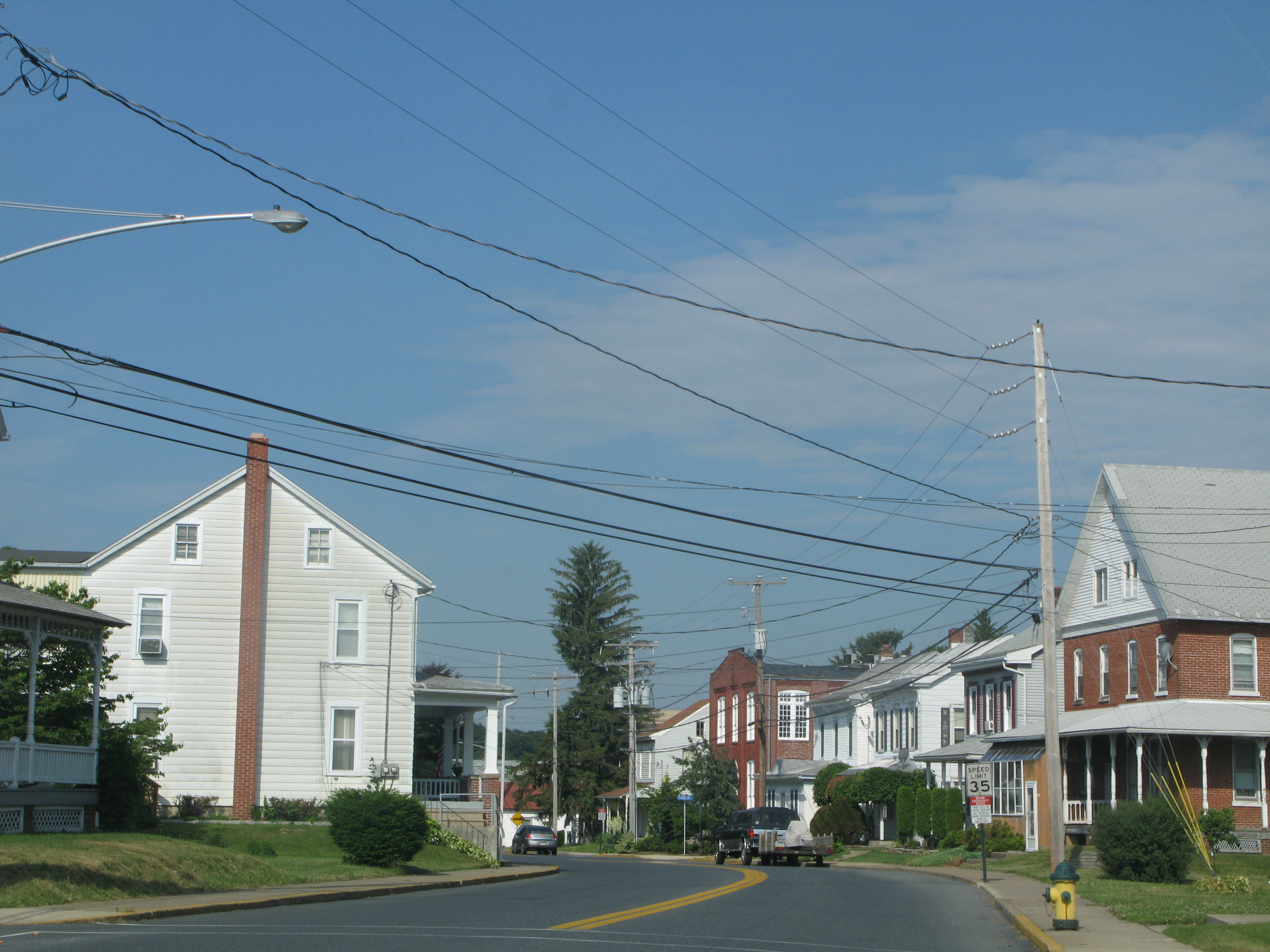
- Noble Avenue in Shoemakersville

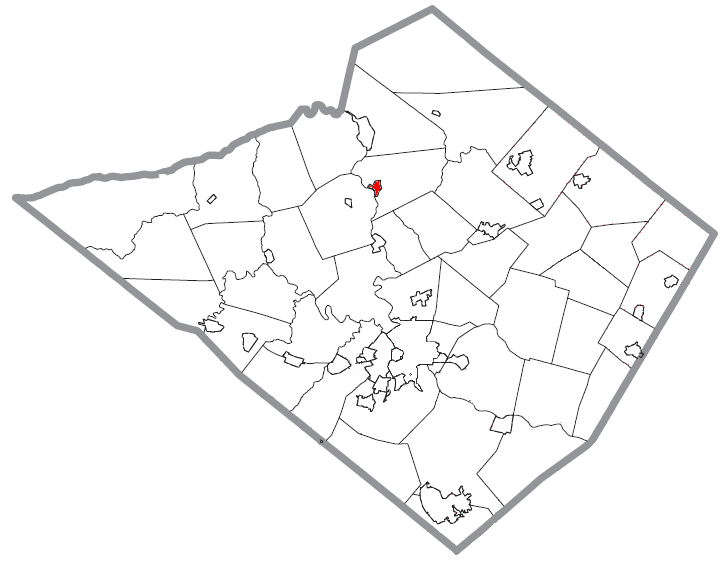
- Location of Shoemakersville in Berks County, Pennsylvania.

- Location of Shoemakersville in Pennsylvania Shoemakersville (the United States)
- Coordinates: 40°30′00″N 75°58′09″W
- Country: United States
- State: Pennsylvania
- County: Berks

Area
  - Total: 0.56 sq mi (1.45 km^{2})
  - Land: 0.54 sq mi (1.39 km^{2})
  - Water: 0.023 sq mi (0.06 km^{2})
- Elevation: 374 ft (114 m)

Population (2020)
  - Total: 1,360
  - Estimate (2019): 1,388
  - Density: 2,580/sq mi (996.2/km^{2})
- Time zone: UTC-5 (EST)
  - Summer (DST): UTC-4 (EDT)
- ZIP code: 19555
- Area codes: 610 and 484
- FIPS code: 42-70464
- Website: https://shoeyboro.org/

Shoemakersville is a borough in Berks County, Pennsylvania, United States. The population was 1,360 at the 2020 census, a decline from the figure of 1,378 tabulated in 2010.

== History ==
Shoemakersville was named for the first settlers, Henry and Charles Shoemaker. It was a thriving apparel manufacturing town.

The Merit Underwear Company factory was added to the National Register of Historic Places in 1996.

== Geography ==
Shoemakersville is located in northern Berks County at 40°30′0″N 75°58′9″W (40.500042, -75.969047), on the east bank of the Schuylkill River.

According to the United States Census Bureau, the borough has a total area of 0.58 square miles (1.5 km^{2}), of which 0.023 square miles (0.06 km^{2}), or 3.96%, is water.

== Demographics ==
Historical population
Census	Pop.	Note	%±
1880	429		—
1930	937		—
1940	1,081		15.4%
1950	1,066		−1.4%
1960	1,464		37.3%
1970	1,427		−2.5%
1980	1,391		−2.5%
1990	1,443		3.7%
2000	2,124		47.2%
2010	1,378		−35.1%
2020	1,360		−1.3%
2022 (est.)	1,427	▲	4.9%
US Census

As of the census of 2000, there were 2,124 people, 605 households, and 402 families residing in the borough. The population density was 4,272.8 inhabitants per square mile (1,649.7/km^{2}). There were 638 housing units at an average density of 1,283.5 per square mile (495.6/km^{2}). The racial makeup of the borough was 92.84% White, 2.97% African American, 0.28% Native American, 0.52% Asian, 2.87% from other races, and 0.52% from two or more races. Hispanic or Latino of any race were 6.73% of the population.

There were 604 households, out of which 27.5% had children under the age of 18 living with them, 55.6% were married couples living together, 6.6% had a female householder with no husband present, and 33.6% were non-families. 29.1% of all households were made up of individuals, and 15.6% had someone living alone who was 65 years of age or older. The average household size was 2.32 and the average family size was 2.87.

In the borough the population was spread out, with 16.0% under the age of 18, 8.0% from 18 to 24, 30.3% from 25 to 44, 20.5% from 45 to 64, and 25.3% who were 65 years of age or older. The median age was 42 years. For every 100 females, there were 105.0 males. For every 100 females age 18 and over, there were 102.2 males.

The median income for a household in the borough was $37,981, and the median income for a family was $47,917. Males had a median income of $30,833 versus $24,083 for females. The per capita income for the borough was $15,756. About 4.0% of families and 17.3% of the population were below the poverty line, including 7.5% of those under age 18 and 12.9% of those age 65 or over.

== Commerce ==
In 2018, there were 306 businesses located in Shoemakersville. The Glen-Gery Brick Corporation, which began in Wyomissing, PA, in the 1890s moved their main manufacturing plant to its Pottsville Pike location in the early 20th century. It remains a major employment provider.

== Education ==
Perry Elementary is located on Fourth Street in Shoemakersville, and it is one of two elementary schools in the Hamburg Area School District. Perry has a student to teacher ratio of 22:1, serving 380 students in grades kindergarten through fifth.

== Police force ==
Currently, Shoemakersville is served by the Pennsylvania State Police - Hamburg Barracks. The borough had its own independent police force from 1924 until June 2006, when it was disbanded by the borough council due to funding issues.

== Transportation ==
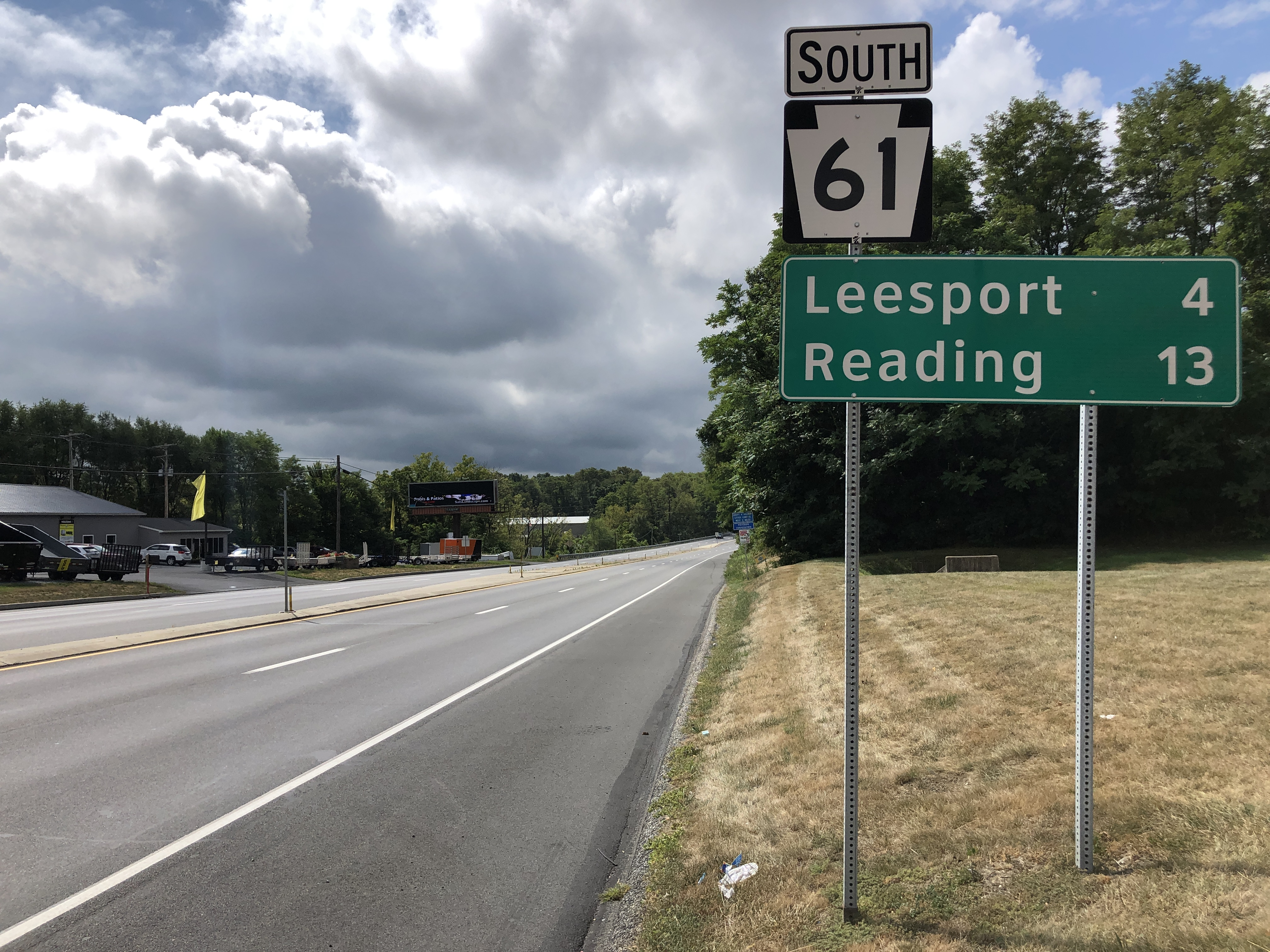
PA 61 southbound in Shoemakersville

As of 2007, there were 6.58 miles (10.59 km) of public roads in Shoemakersville, of which 1.48 miles (2.38 km) were maintained by the Pennsylvania Department of Transportation (PennDOT) and 5.10 miles (8.21 km) were maintained by the borough.

Pennsylvania Route 61 passes through the borough, leading south 12 miles (19 km) to Reading, and north 4 miles (6 km) to Interstate 78/U.S. Route 22 in Hamburg. Pennsylvania Route 662 begins at PA 61 on the eastern border of Shoemakersville and heads southeast to an intersection with U.S. Route 222 in Moselem Springs and Fleetwood.

Berks Area Regional Transportation Authority (BARTA) provides bus service to Shoemakersville along Route 20, which follows PA 61 on its route between Hamburg to the north and the BARTA Transportation Center in Reading to the south.

SEPTA's Pottsville Line once provided passenger rail service to Shoemakersville, with service to Pottsville, Reading, and Philadelphia. The service ceased in 1981 after all diesel services were cancelled. Freight service in Shoemakersville is provided by the Reading Blue Mountain and Northern Railroad, which operates a branch line between Hamburg and Temple through Shoemakersville and its Reading Division mainline through West Shoemakersville.

== Gallery ==
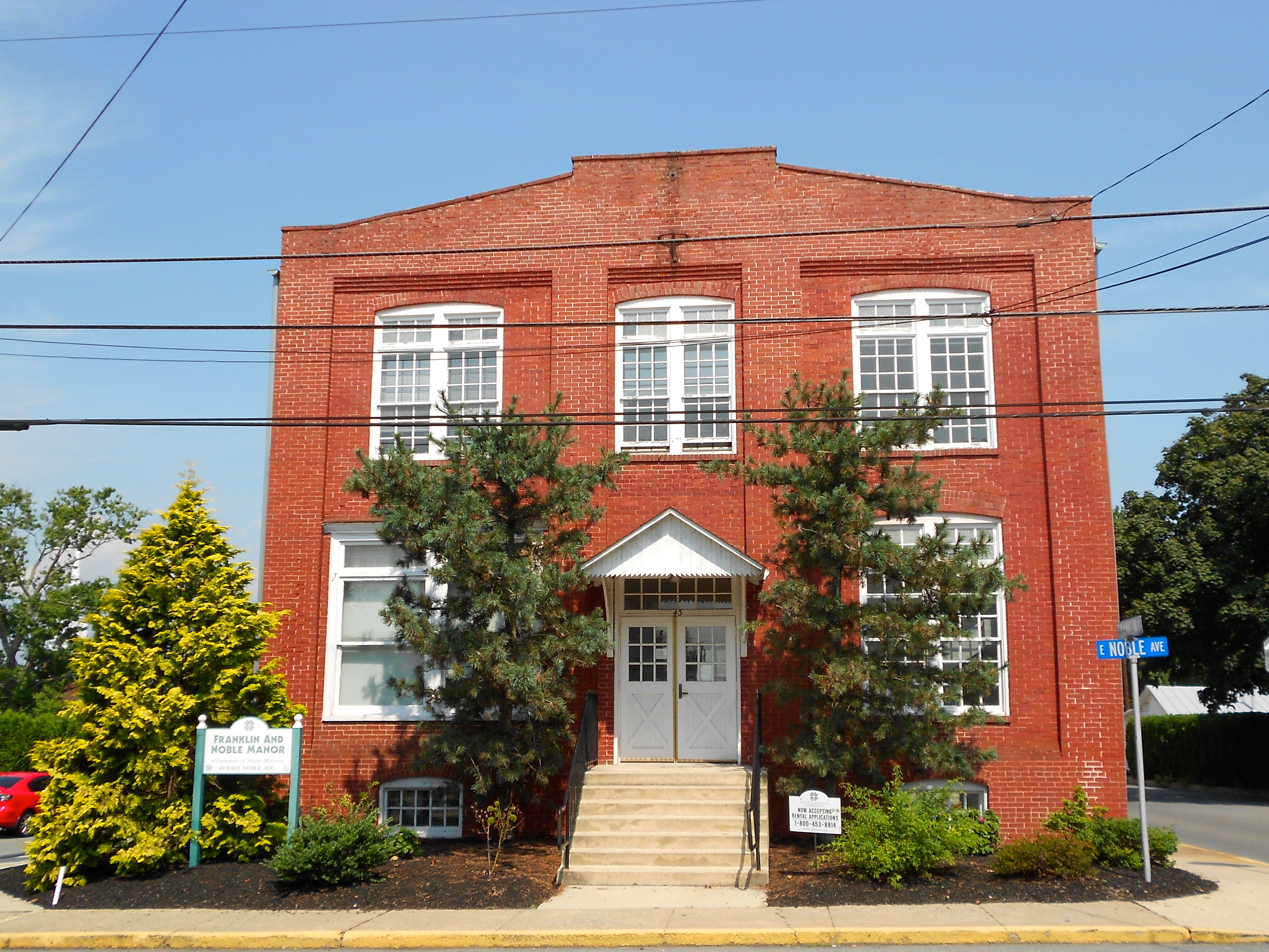
Merit Underwear Company.

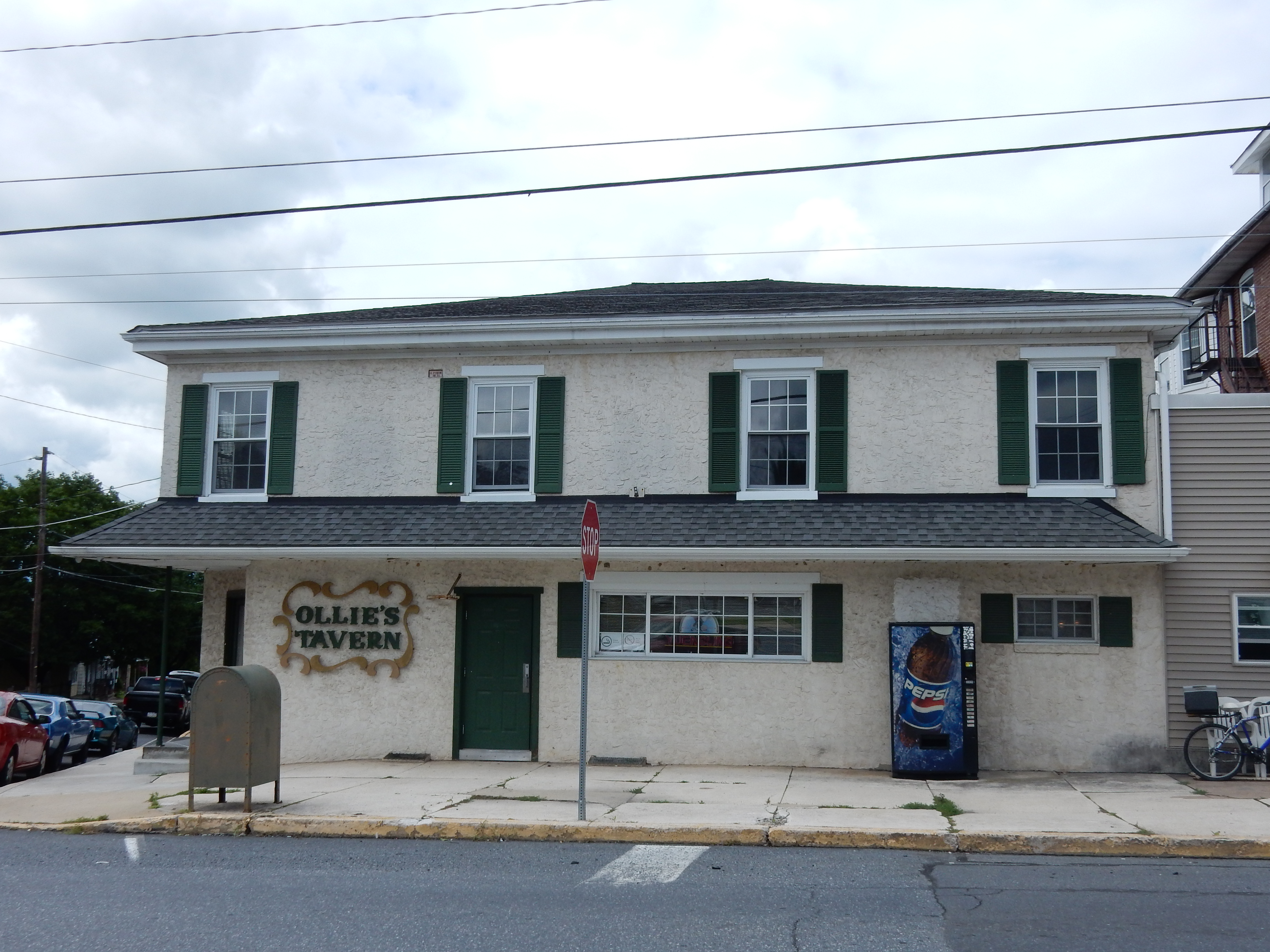
Ollie's Tavern on Main St.

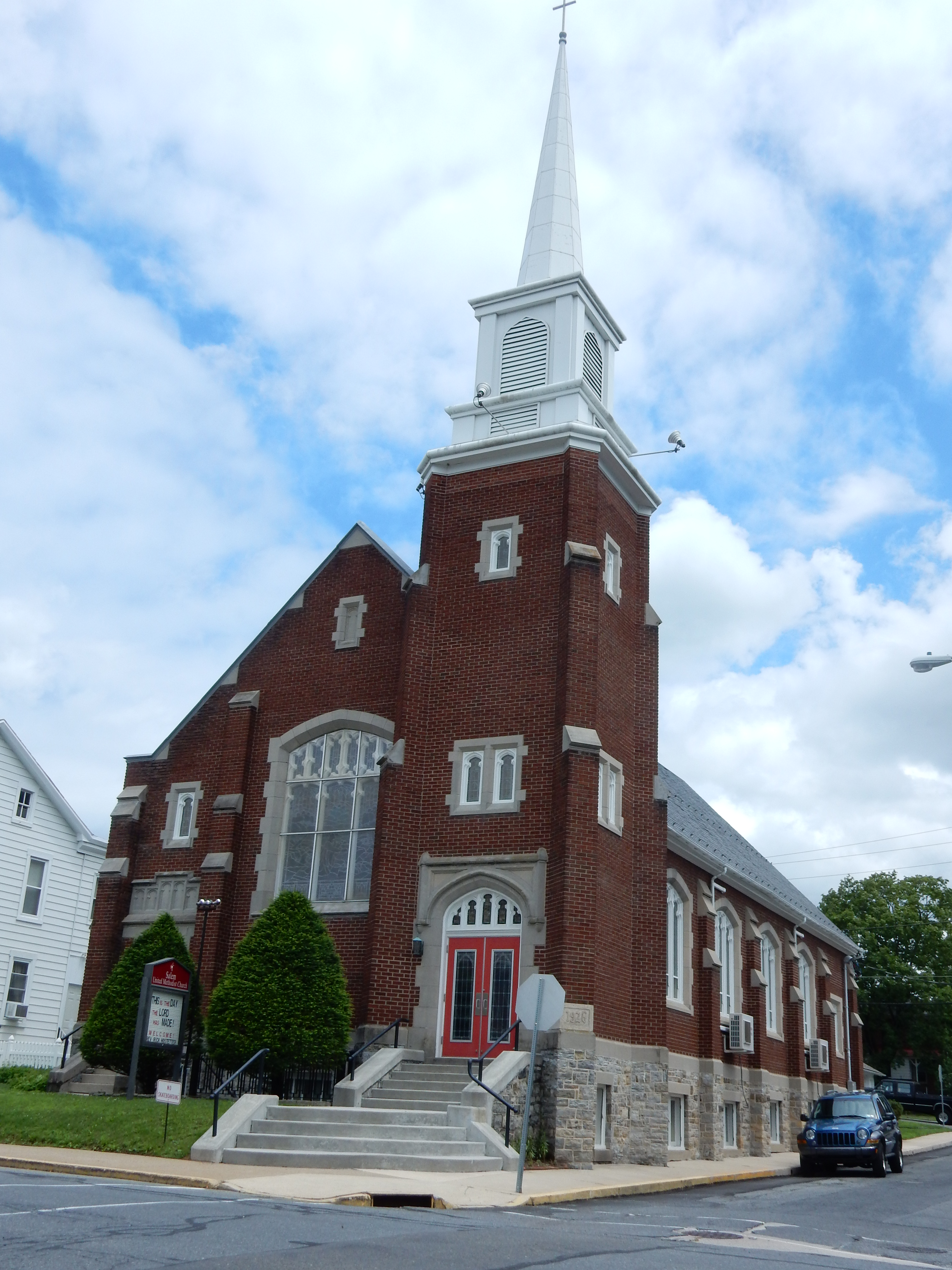
Salem UMC.
