= First National Bank in Fleetwood =

- U.S. National Register of Historic Places
- First National Bank in Fleetwood, December 2012

- Location within Pennsylvania Location within the United States
- Location: Main and Franklin St., Fleetwood, Pennsylvania
- Coordinates: 40°27′20″N 75°49′6″W
- Area: less than one acre
- Built: 1898, c. 1919-1921
- Architectural style: Renaissance Revival
- NRHP reference No.: 05000449
- Added to NRHP: May 20, 2005

First National Bank in Fleetwood, (also known as the First National Bank of Fleetwood or Kutz Brothers Store or Hosiery Mill) is a historic bank building located at the intersection of Main and Franklin Streets in Fleetwood, Berks County, Pennsylvania.

== Description and history ==
It was built in 1898 and remodeled to its present form between 1919 and 1921. It is a three-story, red brick building with a stone front measuring 50 by 125 feet (15 by 38 m) in a vernacular Renaissance Revival style. It was originally built as a store and light manufacturing facility, but converted to use as a bank at the time of remodeling.

It was listed on the National Register of Historic Places on May 20, 2005.
