= Guldin Mill =

- U.S. National Register of Historic Places
- U.S. Historic district
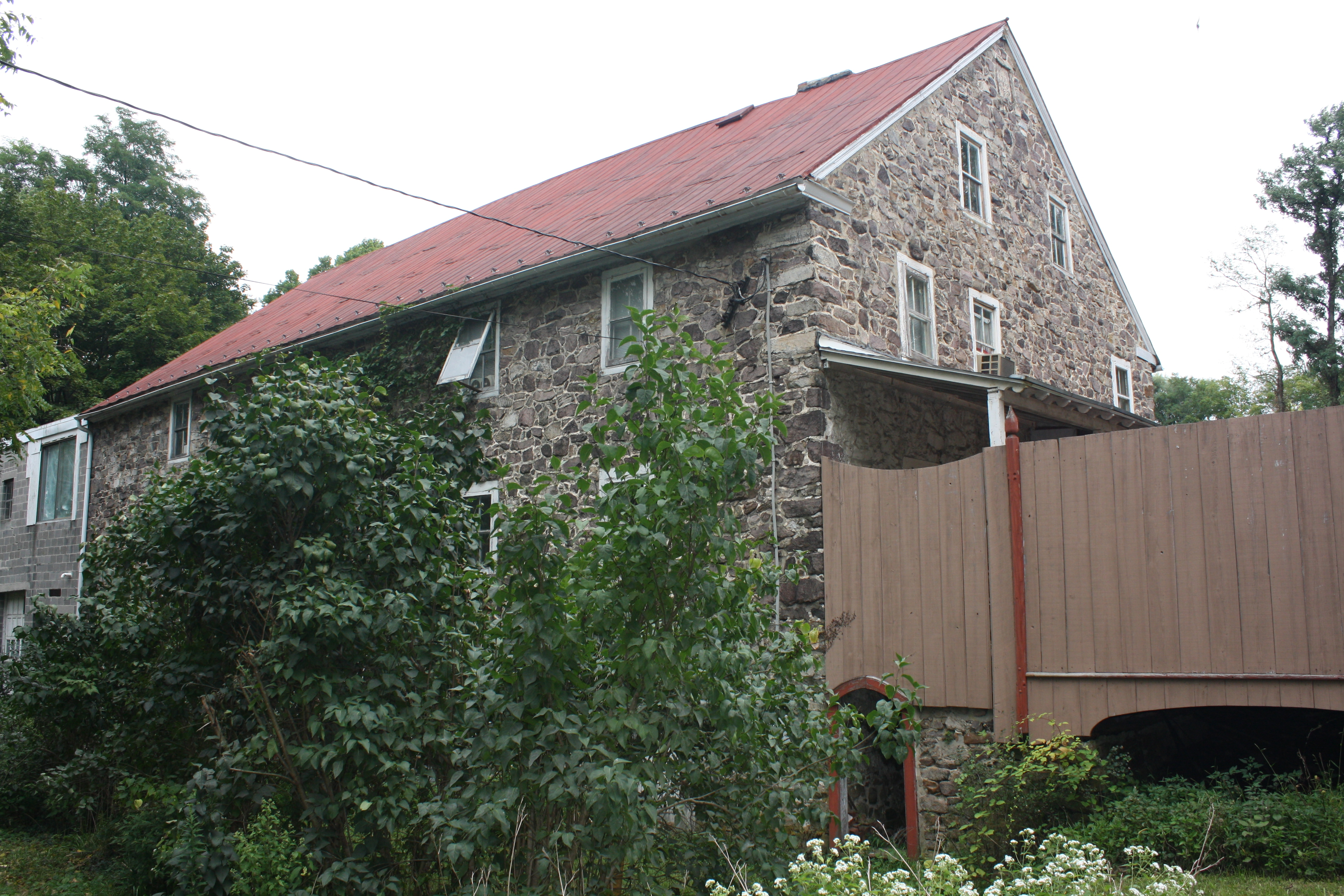
- Guldin Mill, September 2013

- Location within Pennsylvania Location within the United States
- Location: Off PA 73 SE of jct. with US 222 in Maidencreek Township, Pennsylvania
- Coordinates: 40°26′09.6″N 75°52′28.9″W
- Area: 7 acres (2.8 ha)
- Built: 1781, 1822
- MPS: Gristmills in Berks County MPS
- NRHP reference No.: 90001617
- Added to NRHP: November 8, 1990

Guldin Mill, also known as Lauer's Mill, is a historic grist mill and national historic district located in Maidencreek Township in Berks County, Pennsylvania.

It was listed on the National Register of Historic Places in 1990.

== History and architectural features ==
This historic district encompasses one contributing building and one contributing site. The house and mill form a combined structure. The house was built in 1781; the mill was built in 1822. It is a two-and-one-half-story, stone building, which measures forty-two feet by eight feet.

The mill continued to operate into the 1950s. Also located on the property are watercourses, which consist of the headrace, two ponds and the tail race.

== Gallery ==
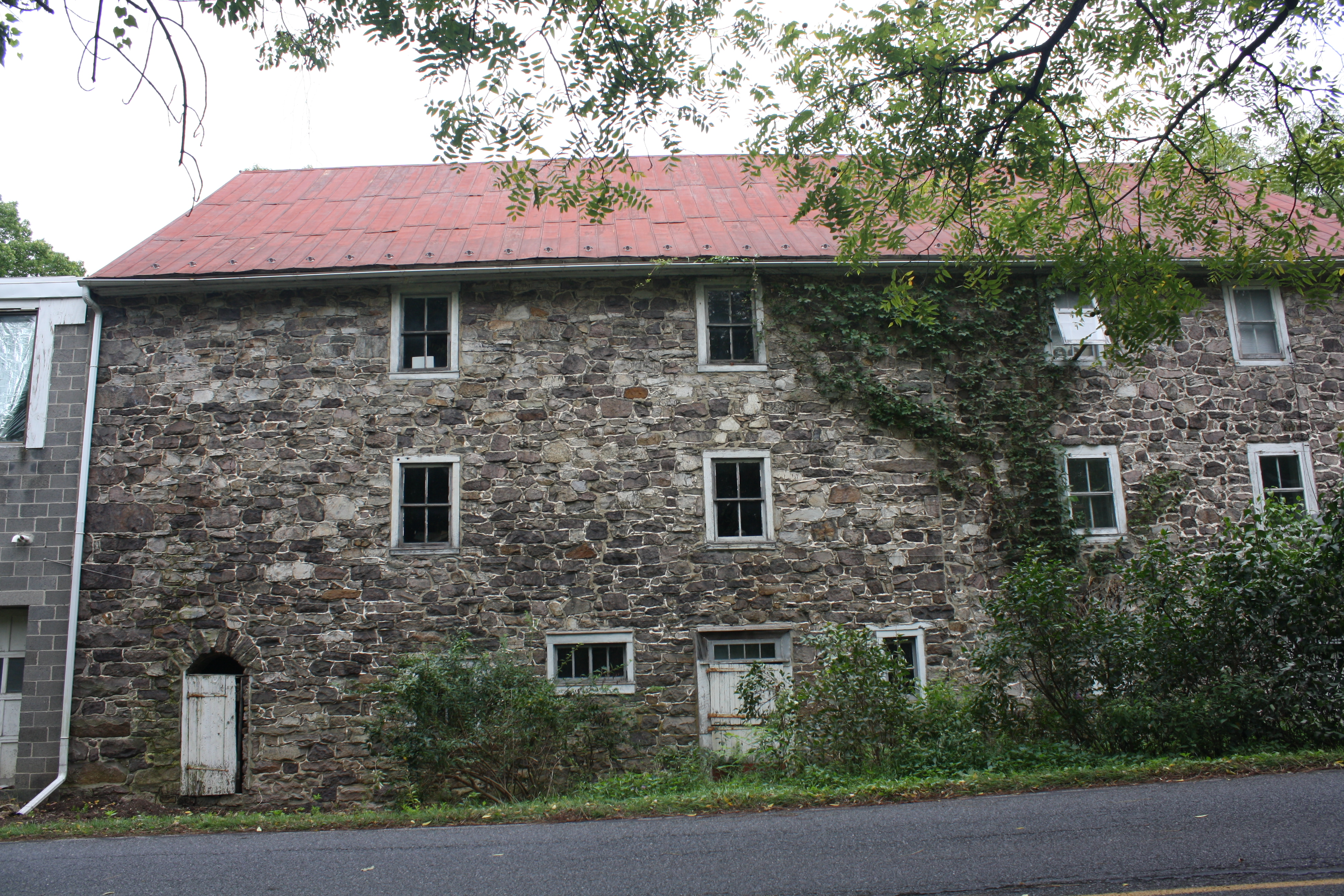

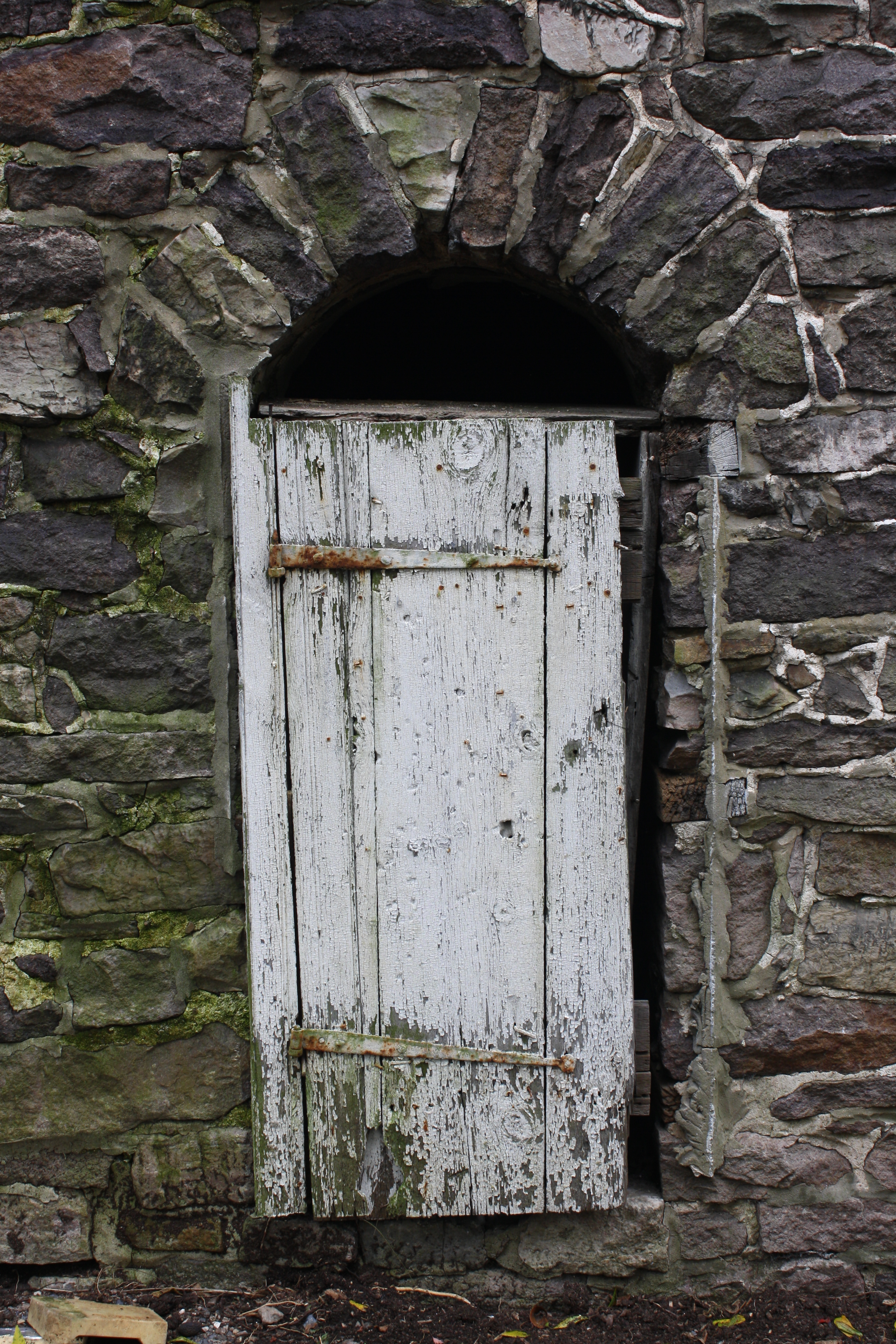
