= Redner's Markets =

Privately held American supermarket

Redner's Markets, Inc.
- Type: Private, employee-owned
- Industry: Retail (Supermarket)
- Founded: March 1970; 56 years ago
- Founders: Earl and Mary Redner
- Headquarters: Reading, Pennsylvania
- Number of locations: 64
- Area served: Eastern Pennsylvania, Delaware and Maryland
- Key people: Richard Redner (Chairman, President); Ryan Redner (CEO); Gary M. Redner (COO)
- Products: Bakery, dairy, delicatessen, frozen foods, fuel, grocery, produce, meats, snack food, general merchandise, snack foods, health & beauty
- Services: Supermarket; Convenience store Gas station Catering; Pharmacy
- Revenue: ▲US$757.1 million
- Owner: Employee-owned
- Number of employees: 4,500 (2020)
- Divisions: Redner's Warehouse Markets; Redner's Fresh Market; Redner's Quick Shoppe
- Website: rednersmarkets.com

Redner's Markets, Inc. is a privately held, American supermarket chain headquartered in Reading, Pennsylvania. Redner's is an employee-owned company that is wholly owned by present and past employees and members of the Redner family. In 2012, 48% was owned by Redner's employees and 52% by the Redner family. Redner's operates stores throughout Pennsylvania, Delaware, and Maryland. The chain has a distribution warehouse located in Maidencreek Township, Pennsylvania.

== History ==
Redner's Markets was founded in March 1970, by Mary (1918–2007) and Earl Redner (1926–2017). They opened two supermarkets in Reading, PA.

In 1975, the company formed an Employee Stock Ownership Plan (ESOP), making them the first supermarket in Pennsylvania to be employee owned.

In March 1987 the company opened its first Warehouse Market location. All its supermarkets were converted to the warehouse style by November 1987.

In October 1990, Earl Redner retired and Richard and Gary W. Redner took over management of the company. Mary Redner died in 2007. Gary W. Redner was murdered in 2008 in a still unsolved homicide. Earl Redner died in 2017.Richard Redner died in 2024

The company is currently managed by third generation Ryan Redner and Gary M. Redner.

In 2020, Redner's Warehouse Markets celebrated their 50th anniversary.

Redner's logo prior to 2019

== Divisions ==
Redner's operations are organized into three divisions: Redner's Warehouse Market, Redner's Fresh Market and Redner's Quick Shoppe. The total number of Redner's locations is 64.

=== Redner's Warehouse Market ===
Redner's warehouse market in Trexlertown, Pennsylvania.

Redner's Warehouse Markets, also known as Redner's, are warehouse-style markets without the need of a store club membership fee. Most locations range from 40,000 and 59,000 square feet (3,700 and 5,500 square meters) in store size. These stores stock general merchandise and a full-service supermarket, selling products such as meat and poultry, baked goods, delicatessen, frozen foods, dairy products, garden produce, and fresh seafood. As of May 20, 2021, there were 42 Redner's Warehouse Market locations in Pennsylvania, Delaware, and Maryland.

=== Redner's Fresh Market ===
Redner's Fresh Markets are more conventional supermarkets and are slightly smaller than the size of a Redner's Warehouse Market. These stores offer beer & wine café, full-service food and grocery, and beauty aids/non-foods. As of May 18, 2025, there were 7 Redner's Fresh Markets. The first location opened in the fall of 2019 in Reading, with two more locations (one in Audubon and one in Bel Air, Maryland) opening soon after. Additional Fresh Markets include Lewes, DE (opened November 2022), Langhorne, PA (converted from a Warehouse Market in fall 2023), and Collegeville, PA (converted from a Warehouse Market with a ribbon-cutting on May 2, 2024). The Wyomissing store at Berkshire Square, opened in April 2017, also remains operational.

=== Redner's Quick Shoppe ===
Redner's Quick Shoppe is a combined gas station and convenience store. Some Redner's Quick Shoppe locations offer Automatic Car Washes and Diesel. As of May 20, 2021, there were 20 Redner's Quick Shoppes.
