= Merit Underwear Company =

- U.S. National Register of Historic Places
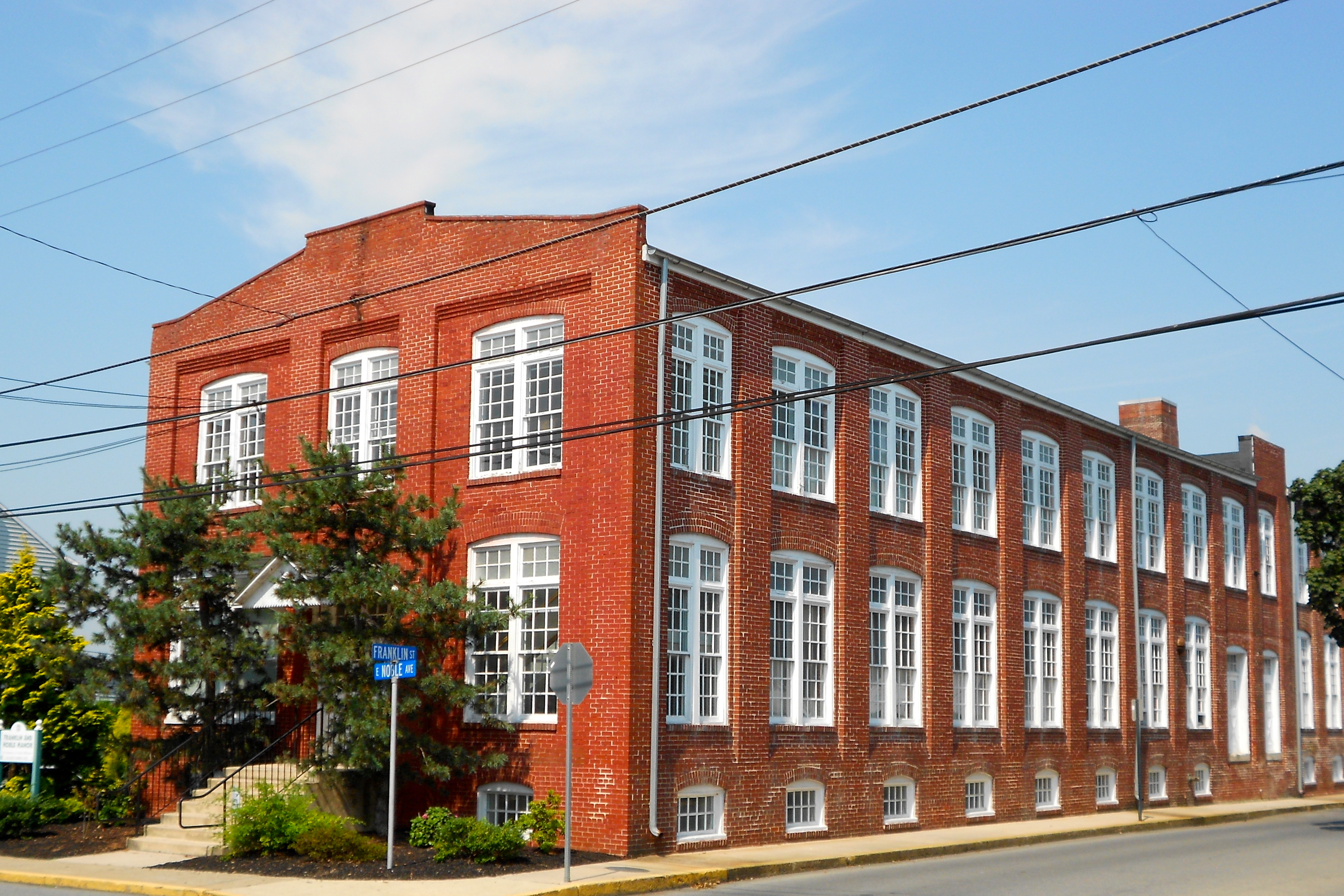

- Location within Pennsylvania Location within the United States
- Location: 43 E. Noble Ave., Shoemakersville, Pennsylvania
- Coordinates: 40°30′6″N 75°58′6″W
- Area: less than one acre
- Built: 1916, 1921, 1928
- NRHP reference No.: 96000711
- Added to NRHP: June 28, 1996

The Merit Underwear Company is an historic factory building in Shoemakersville, Berks County, Pennsylvania, US.

It was added to the National Register of Historic Places in 1996.

== History and architectural features ==
Built in 1916, this historic structure is a two-story, rectangular, brick building measuring 40 by 100 feet (12 by 30 m). It was added to the front of an earlier wood-frame building, which was later replaced with a two-story, irregularly-shaped brick structure that was erected in 1928. A two-story, brick addition was built in 1921. The addition measures fifty-two feet by seventy-one feet. The building was occupied by garment manufacturers into the 1990s.
