= Fleetwood Area High School =

Location
- 803 North Richmond Street; Fleetwood, Pennsylvania 19522; United States
- Coordinates: 40.460°N 75.828°W

Information
- Other name: FAHS
- Type: Public high school
- School district: Fleetwood Area School District
- NCES School ID: 420978005023
- Principal: Stephen A. Herman
- Teaching staff: 63.08 (on an FTE basis)
- Grades: 9–12
- Enrollment: 759 (2023-2024)
- Student to teacher ratio: 12.03
- Colors: Red and White
- Website: hs.fleetwoodasd.org

Fleetwood Area High School (also known as the Fleetwood Joint Area High School) is a public high school in Fleetwood, Pennsylvania. It is part of the Fleetwood Area School District.

== History ==
The new Fleetwood Area High School building was dedicated on September 8, 1968. Erected at a cost of two and a half million dollars, the building had been in partial use since February of that year, with classes transferring from the old school building to the new one as various phases of construction were completed. Once completed, the building featured nineteen standard classrooms, plus additional classrooms for art, home economics, industrial arts, language studies, music, and science, each of which was electrically heated and were also wired for closed circuit television. The new auditorium and gymnasium had seating capacities of 602 and 806, respectively. Situated on forty acres of land, the school also had four tennis courts, a track and soccer field, and two sports practice fields. Ralph C. Swan, Pennsylvania's state superintendent of public instruction, delivered the dedication ceremony address. Music was provided by the high school band, the members of which reportedly wore their new band uniforms for the first time. Frank E. Daniels was principal of the high school that year.
