= FirstEnergy Stadium (Reading, Pennsylvania) =

Baseball stadium in Pennsylvania, U.S.

- America's Classic Ballpark

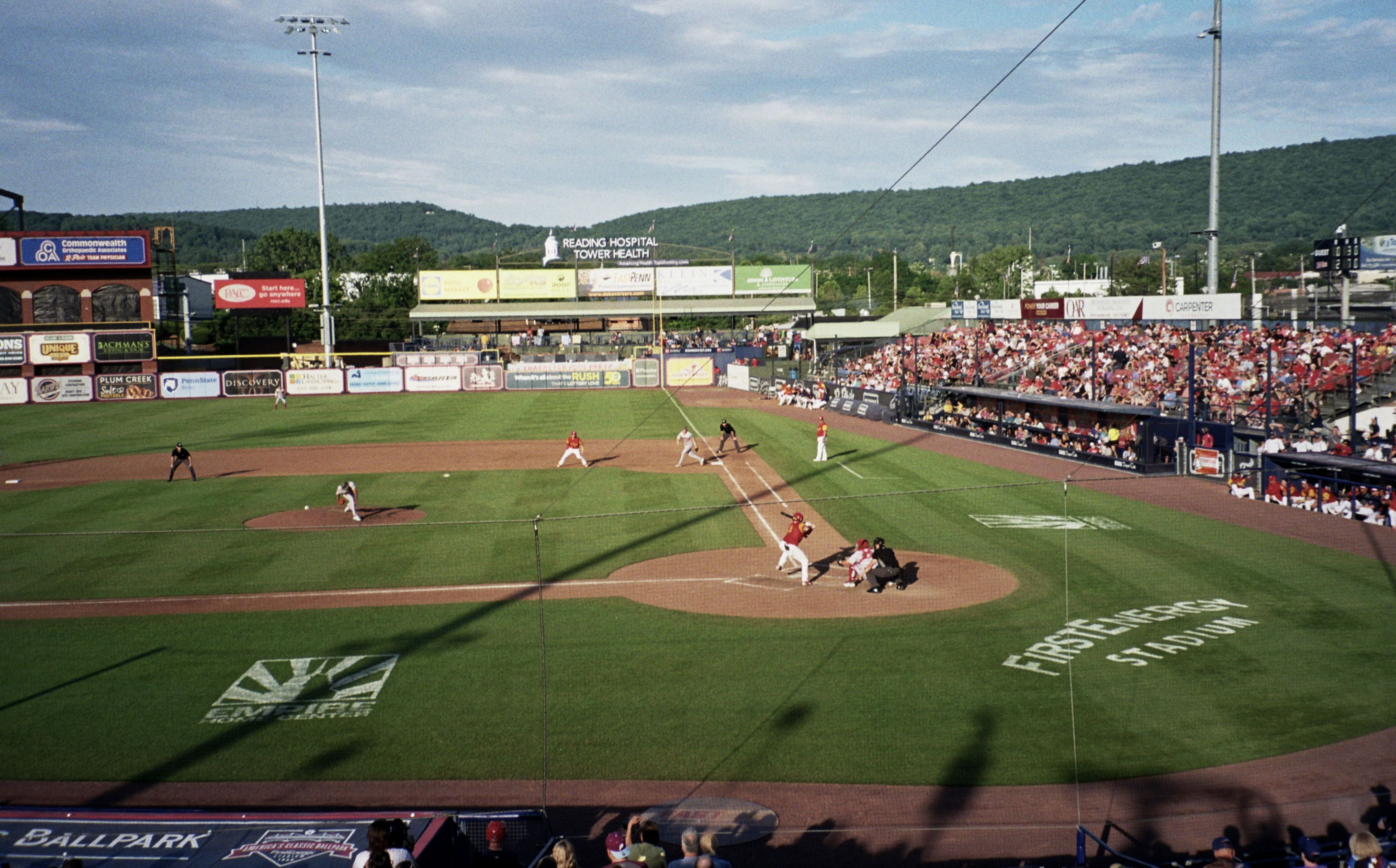

- Location within Pennsylvania Location within the United States
- Former names: Reading Municipal Memorial Stadium; GPU Stadium
- Location: 1900 Centre Avenue; Reading, Pennsylvania 19605
- Coordinates: 40°21′57″N 75°56′1″W
- Owner: City of Reading
- Operator: Reading Baseball G.P.
- Capacity: 10,000
- Surface: Grass
- Field size: Left field – 330 feet (101 m); Center field – 400 feet (122 m); Right field – 330 feet (101 m)
- Public transit: BARTA bus: 19, 20

Construction
- Groundbreaking: July 26, 1947
- Opened: April 15, 1951
- Cost: $656,674 ($8.15 million in 2025 dollars)
- Architect: Muhlenberg Brothers
- General contractor: Potteiger Construction Company

Tenants
- Reading Indians (EL) 1952–1961; Reading Red Sox (EL) 1963–1964; Reading Fightin Phils (EL) 1967–present

FirstEnergy Stadium is a 10,000-seat baseball-only stadium in Reading, Pennsylvania, that hosted its first regular season baseball game in 1951. The park is home to the Reading Fightin Phils of the Eastern League. It was voted the second best place to see a baseball game by Minor League News in 2006. It is also the first ballpark to ever receive the annual Digital Ballparks.com Ballpark Of The Year Award, which it was awarded in 2002. It is the first American baseball stadium to reach a total attendance of ten million without ever serving a team higher than AA.

== History ==
On March 28, 1945, Reading City Council voted unanimously to purchase 27 acres of ground known as Cathedral Heights at a cost of $64,491 for the purpose of building a municipal stadium. In 1947 the grading of the land began and by 1949 the initial stages of construction could be seen. With a final price tag of $656,674, the stadium was completed on April 15, 1951. Named in honor of U.S. military personnel who died while serving, Reading Municipal Memorial Stadium was dedicated on July 15 that same year.

The stadium was originally known as Reading Municipal-Memorial Stadium before corporate sponsorship resulted in its current name.

Mike Schmidt made his professional debut at the ballpark on June 17, 1971, in an exhibition game between the Philadelphia Phillies and the Reading Phillies. The Phillies had signed Schmidt on June 11. In the exhibition game, Schmidt played the whole game at shortstop for the Phillies and hit the game-winning home run against Reading.

On July 13, 1977, The Reading Municipal Stadium hosted a concert by the band Chicago. To date, this was the only major entertainment event held at the 10,000-seat facility.

Prior to Municipal Stadium, Reading's professional baseball teams played at Lauer's Park.

=== Upgrades ===
In January 1989, Municipal Stadium experienced its first significant improvement in its then 36-year history. The wooden bench seating in the main grandstand was replaced by individual seats, and a roof was erected to cover 1,500 of those seats. The press box was also expanded as a part of the project, which cost more than $500,000.

The third base picnic area was built between the 1989 and 1990 season at a cost of $125,000. The right field food court was started and completed during the 1991–1992 off-season at a cost of $45,000.

After the 1992 season, the left field bleachers were demolished and a new grandstand was built in its place, which doubled that area's capacity to 1,600 seats.

The stadium's exterior received a facelift in October 1992 to enhance the appearance of the park's front façade. Also during this time, the team offices were expanded and renovated, and a souvenir shop was added.

Following the 1993 season, a batting tunnel was built behind the third base bleachers. The left field deck was also constructed during that off-season, which provided the stadium with its first "home run" seats and a bar that overlooked the field. In 1996, 483 individual seats and eight private boxes were added to the deck.

The playing field underwent improvements during the fall of 1994. A new drainage system was implemented, and the number of rainouts per season dropped from an average of ten before the drainage system to just three after its installation.

After the 1997 season, the "Boardwalk" was added to the left field deck area, which added standing room for about 150 between the existing deck and the left field fence. Also during the fall of 1997, a $675,000 video scoreboard was added, and along with two new video cameras, the state-of-the-art board gave the Phillies the capability of showing color video during games.

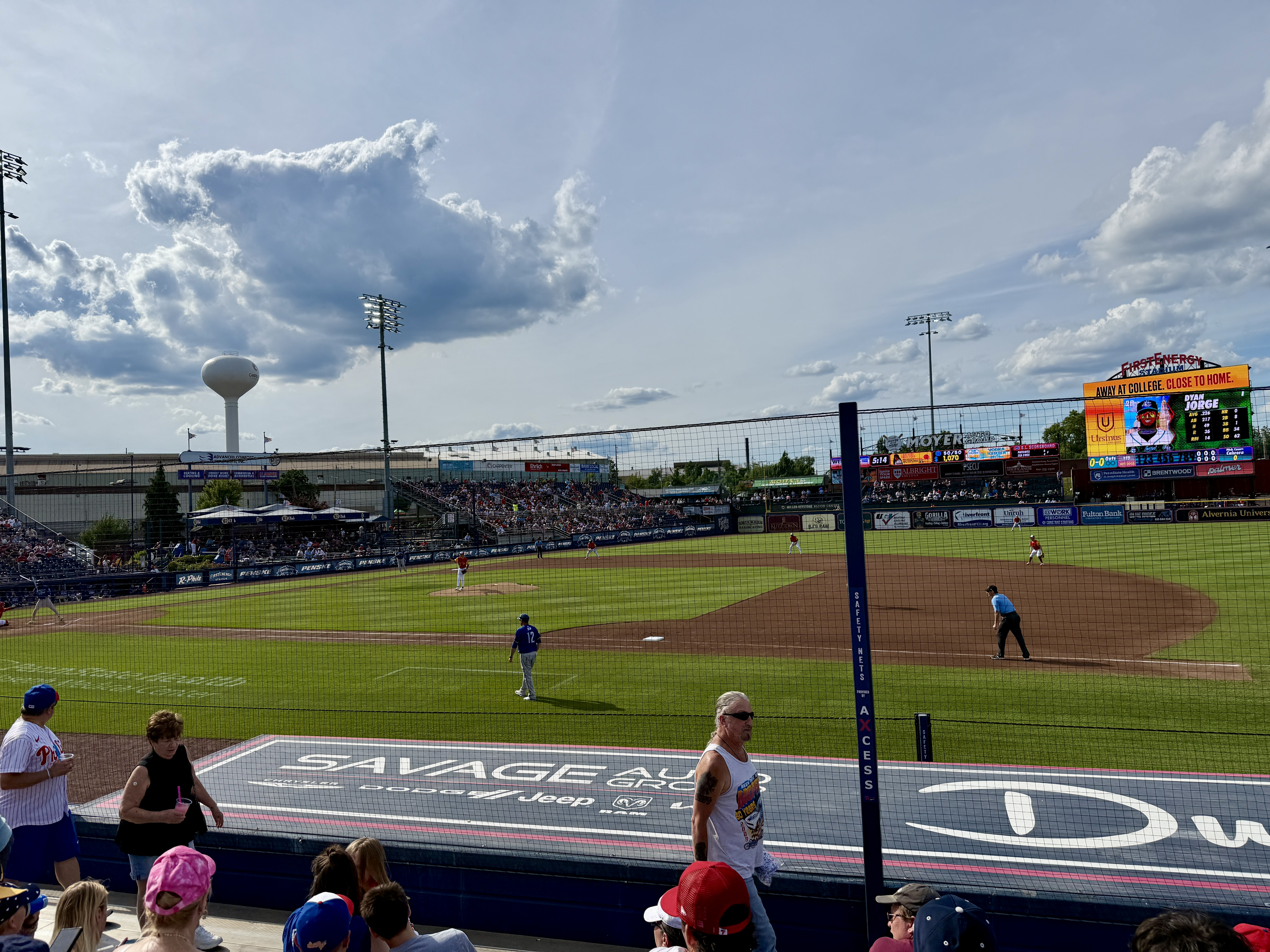
The Reading Fightin Phils play the Hartford Yard Goats at FirstEnergy Stadium on June 21, 2026

The R-Phils constructed a $1.4 million pool pavilion beyond the right field fence, featuring a 1,000-square foot heated pool. Another picnic buffet area for fans, umpires' locker rooms, a weight room and additional storage space was Added. In a separate project, the Power Alley Pub was constructed in March 2001. The pub became an extension of the left field deck.

After the 2002 season, the individual seats in the left field deck were replaced by a four-tiered picnic area, and the Classic Café was constructed underneath the first base bleachers.

Prior to the 2004 season, a Daktronics ProStar was added, which measures 36' W × 15.5' H (558 sq. ft) and has the ability to display 68 billion colors through approximately 185 LEDs per square foot.

Prior to the 2011 season, $10 million was spent in renovating the stadium. These renovations included the brand new VIST Financial Plaza, an expanded ticket plaza outside of the gates, a climate controlled walk-in team store, family bathrooms, brand new offices for front office members, more parking spaces, light poles, cement in the main grandstand, padded outfield walls, and new clubhouses for both the home and visiting teams.

In 2024, a new clubhouse and event center was added along with upgrades to training facilities as part of a $45 million dollar project.
