= Fleetwood Area School District =

School district in Pennsylvania

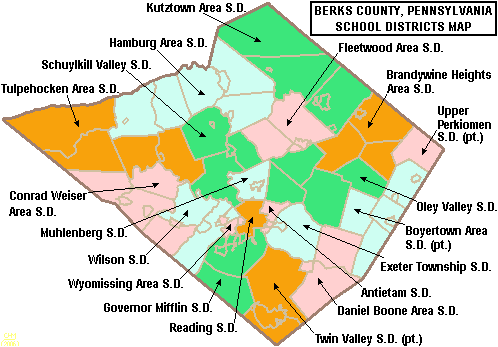

Address
- 801 North Richmond Street Fleetwood, Pennsylvania; United States

District information
- Type: Public school district
- Grades: K to 12
- Superintendent: Dr. Greg M. Miller
- NCES District ID: 4209780

Students and staff
- Students: 2,258 (2022–2023)
- Teachers: 185.53 (2022-2023) (on an FTE basis)
- Student–teacher ratio: 12.17:1 (2022-2023)
- District mascot: Tiger
- Colors: Red and White

Other information
- Website: www.fleetwoodasd.k12.pa.us

Fleetwood Area School District is a public school district located in north central Berks County in Fleetwood, Pennsylvania. The district serves students in the community of Fleetwood as well as Richmond Township to the north and Maidencreek Township to the south. The district offers a wide variety of academic courses, music, the arts, sports programs and extra curricular activities.

== Overview ==
The Fleetwood Area School District serves the children of Fleetwood Borough, Maidencreek Township (Blandon, Maidencreek, Evansville, Molltown and Kirbyville), and Richmond Township (Walnuttown, Richmond, Moselm Springs, and Virginville). The district covers over thirty-nine square miles in northeastern Berks County and is one of eighteen public school districts that comprise the Berks County Intermediate Unit (#14).

The district serves roughly 2,000 students kindergarten through twelfth grade. These students are served in four buildings, including two K–4 elementary schools, a 5–8 middle school, and a high school for grades 9–12. The tax base for the school district is primarily residential, with a few exceptions, including the factories of East Penn Manufacturing and Giorgio Food Company.

Central administration includes a superintendent and assistant superintendent who jointly oversee the operation of the school district. The superintendent directly supervises the business operation of the school district in conjunction with the business manager and her assistant. In addition, the superintendent also supervises the director of student services whose responsibilities include special education and pupil services staff and programs. The assistant superintendent is responsible for designing and supervising curriculum implementation district-wide and, together with the superintendent, supervises the principals. The Fleetwood Area School District is the home of the Fleetwood Tigers. The school district colors are red and white.

== History and buildings ==
=== Current School District Buildings ===
- Fleetwood Area High School (Est. 1998) - located on North Richmond Street, serving grades 9-12
- Fleetwood Area Middle School (Est. 1968) - located on North Richmond Street next to the High School, serving grades 5-8
- Andrew Maier Elementary School (Est. 1951) - on Andrew Maier Blvd, in Blandon, Pennsylvania. serving grades K-4
- Willow Creek Elementary School (Est. 2008) - located on Criss Cross Road, serving grades K-4

=== Former School District Buildings ===
- Richmond Elementary School (Est.1955-2019) - located on Route 222. The building was subsequently purchased by YMCA in 2019
- Fleetwood Elementary School (Est. 1957) - located on West Vine Street
- Fleetwood Area High School (Est. 1877)- located on West Arch Street

== Curriculum ==
The Fleetwood Area School District complies with Pennsylvania Department of Education learning standards and graduation requirements. The school district partners with the Berks Career and Technology Center to offer dual enrollment for high school students. In addition, the district has many specialized classes assisting students to not only prepare themselves for college, but also to earn college credit. The district has arranged several dual-enrollment and Advanced Placement options. Dual Enrollment is available through Reading Area Community College, Kutztown University, and Albright College.

== Athletics ==
The Fleetwood Area School District belongs to District 3 of the Pennsylvania Interscholastic Athletic Association Inc. (PIAA). Several of the district's athletes participate in co-op teams including boys football at both high school and middle school levels and girls soccer at the middle school level.

=== High School Athletics (Total Athletes Enrolled: 621) ===
==== Boys Athletics ====
- Baseball, AAAA
- Basketball, AAAAA
- Cross Country, AA
- Football, AAAAA
- Golf, AAA
- Soccer, AAA
- Tennis, AA
- Track and Field, AAA
- Volleyball, AA

==== Girls Athletics ====
- Basketball, AAAA
- Competitive Spirit, AA
- Cross Country, AA
- Field Hockey, A
- Soccer, AAAA
- Tennis, AA
- Track and Field, AAA
- Volleyball, AAA

=== Middle School Athletics (Total Athletes Enrolled: 552) ===
==== Boys Athletics ====
- Baseball
- Basketball
- Cross Country
- Football
- Soccer
- Track and Field

==== Girls Athletics ====
- Basketball
- Competitive Spirit
- Cross Country
- Soccer
- Softball
- Track and Field
- Volleyball
