= Indiana County Transit Authority =

- Founded: 1979
- Headquarters: Indiana, Pennsylvania
- Service area: Indiana County, Pennsylvania
- Service type: public transit
- Routes: 12
- Hubs: Downtown Transit Center; Indiana, Pennsylvania
- Fleet: 37 buses
- Fuel type: CNG
- Chief executive: Jack Cunningham, Chairperson; John Kanyan, Executive Director
- Website: www.indigobus.com

The Indiana County Transit Authority, doing business as IndiGO, is a public transportation system, serving the Indiana County Area of Pennsylvania.

== Fleet ==
Fleet numbers	Build Date	Manufacturer	Model	Engine	Transmission
007-009	2015	Gillig	Low Floor CNG 29'	Cummins Westport ISL G	Allison B300R
284	2012	Gillig	Low Floor CNG 29'	Cummins Westport ISL G	Allison B300R
285	2013	Gillig	Low Floor CNG 29'	Cummins Westport ISL G	Allison B300R
544-545	2024	Gillig	Low Floor CNG 29'	Cummins Westport L9N	Allison B300R
648-649	2014	Gillig	Low Floor CNG 29'	Cummins Westport ISL G	Allison B300R
816-817	2015	Champion Defender	Ford F550'		
859-862	2019	StarTrans Ford HD Senator	Ford F550'		
930	2019	Gillig	Low Floor CNG 35'	Cummins Westport L9N	Allison B400R
B1000 B1250 B1500 B1750	2025	Blue Bird	Vison	Ford V8 Gasoline	

== Routes (as of June 2021) ==
- 1 - Oakland Avenue
- 2 - West Indiana
- 3 - Hospital/119 Professional/Airport Road
- 5 - East Indiana
- 6 - Blairsville
- 7 - Plumville/Smicksburg
- 8 - Plumville/Smicksburg/Punxsutawney
- 9 - Blairsville/Brush Valley
- 11 - PM Extra (combined Routes 2, 3 and 5)
- 12 - IUP Shopper (IUP Campus and Downtown Indiana to all Oakland Ave Shopping Plazas) [Daily]
- 20 - IUP Park & Ride
