= Maidencreek Township, Pennsylvania =

Township in Pennsylvania, US

Maidencreek Township
- Township
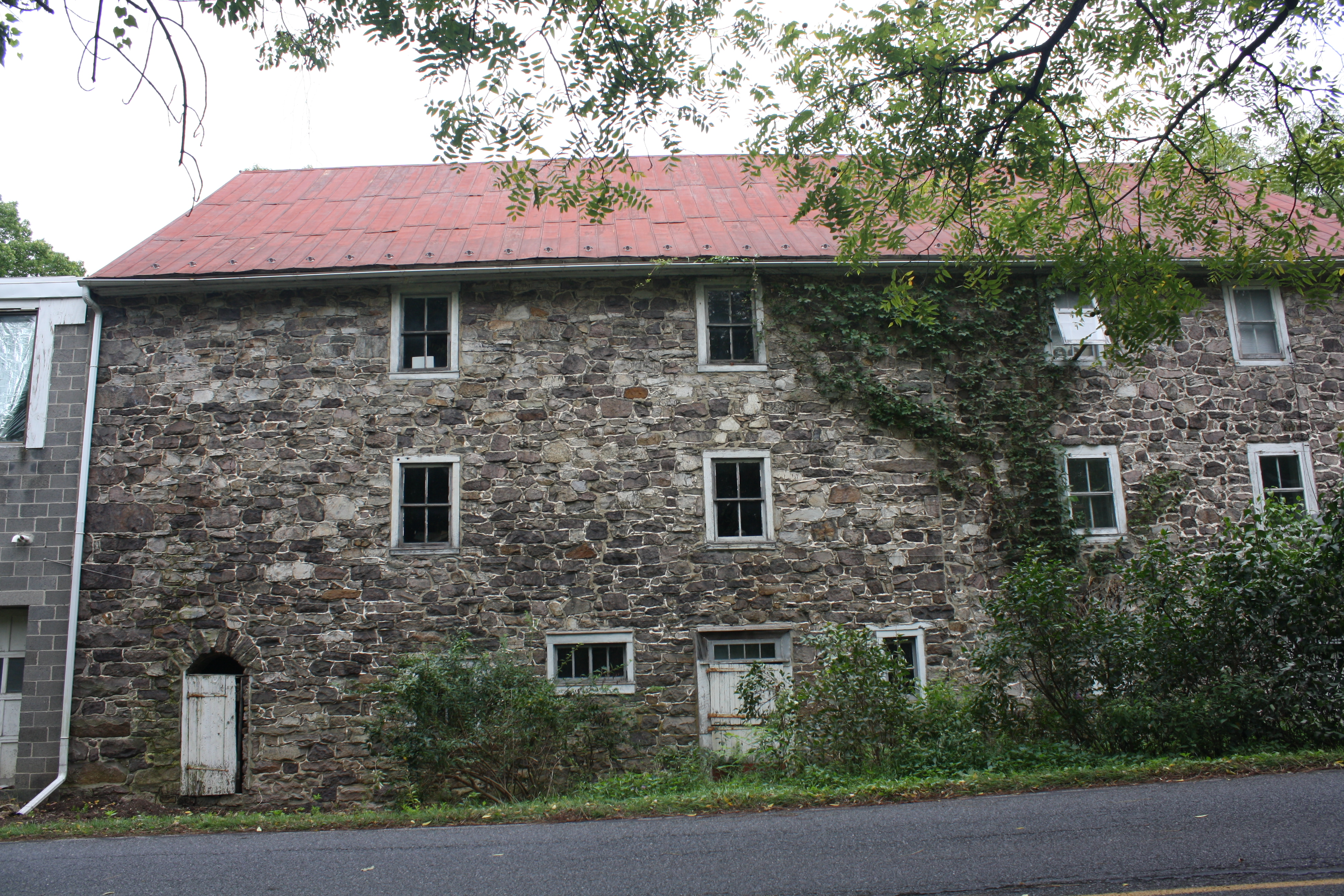
- Guldin Mill in Maidencreek Township

- Location of Maidencreek Township in Berks County, Pennsylvania

- Location of Maidencreek Township in Pennsylvania Maidencreek Township (the United States)
- Coordinates: 40°26′50″N 75°53′15″W
- Country: United States
- State: Pennsylvania
- County: Berks

Area
  - Total: 14.60 sq mi (37.82 km^{2})
  - Land: 13.46 sq mi (34.85 km^{2})
  - Water: 1.15 sq mi (2.97 km^{2})
- Elevation: 335 ft (102 m)

Population (2010)
  - Total: 9,126
  - Estimate (2016): 9,420
  - Density: 700.1/sq mi (270.32/km^{2})
- Time zone: UTC-5 (EST)
  - Summer (DST): UTC-4 (EDT)
- ZIP Codes: 19510, 19522
- Area code: 610
- FIPS code: 42-011-46680
- Website: www.maidencreek.net

Maidencreek Township is a township in Berks County, Pennsylvania, United States. The population was 9,126 at the 2010 census.

== History ==
Maidencreek Township was founded in December 1746, and was named after a creek that runs diagonally through the township. Quakers who settled the area in 1732 lived peacefully among the Lenape Indians until roughly 1800, when Quakers began moving west.

The western portion of Maidencreek Township was separated to form Ontelaunee Township in 1849.

Over the next 100 years, German and, later, Scots Welsh, and Irish settlers purchased and moved into the areas that the Quakers left behind. The Germans were the first arrive, and established German, then known as Deutsch or Dutch, as the region's predominant language. German remained the primary language in the area until the beginning of the 20th century. One room schools instructed students in German as their primary language, and English as their second language as part of the curriculum.

Farming was the primary means of living well into the early 20th century when roadways, housing developments, and commercial and industrial development began to predominate in the 1980s.

Guldin Mill was listed on the National Register of Historic Places in 1990.

== Geography ==
According to the U.S. Census Bureau, the township has a total area of 14.4 square miles (37.2 km^{2}), 13.2 square miles (34.3 km^{2}) of which is land and 1.1 square miles (2.8 km^{2}) (7.67%) of which is water.

=== Adjacent townships ===
- Perry Township (north)
- Richmond Township (east)
- Ruscombmanor Township (southeast)
- Muhlenberg Township (southwest)
- Ontelaunee Township (west)

=== Neighborhoods ===
- Blandon
- Blandon Meadows
- Creekside Manor
- Georgetown Village
- Golden Manor
- Limestone Village
- Maidencreek Estates
- Maidencreek Ridge
- Ontelaunee Heights
- Shadow Ridge
- Tree Tops
- Village at Maiden Creek
- Walnut Manor
- Willow Gardens
- Hidden Meadows
- Manor Creek
- Meadowbrook
- Melrose Place
- Park Place
- Walnuttown

== Transportation ==
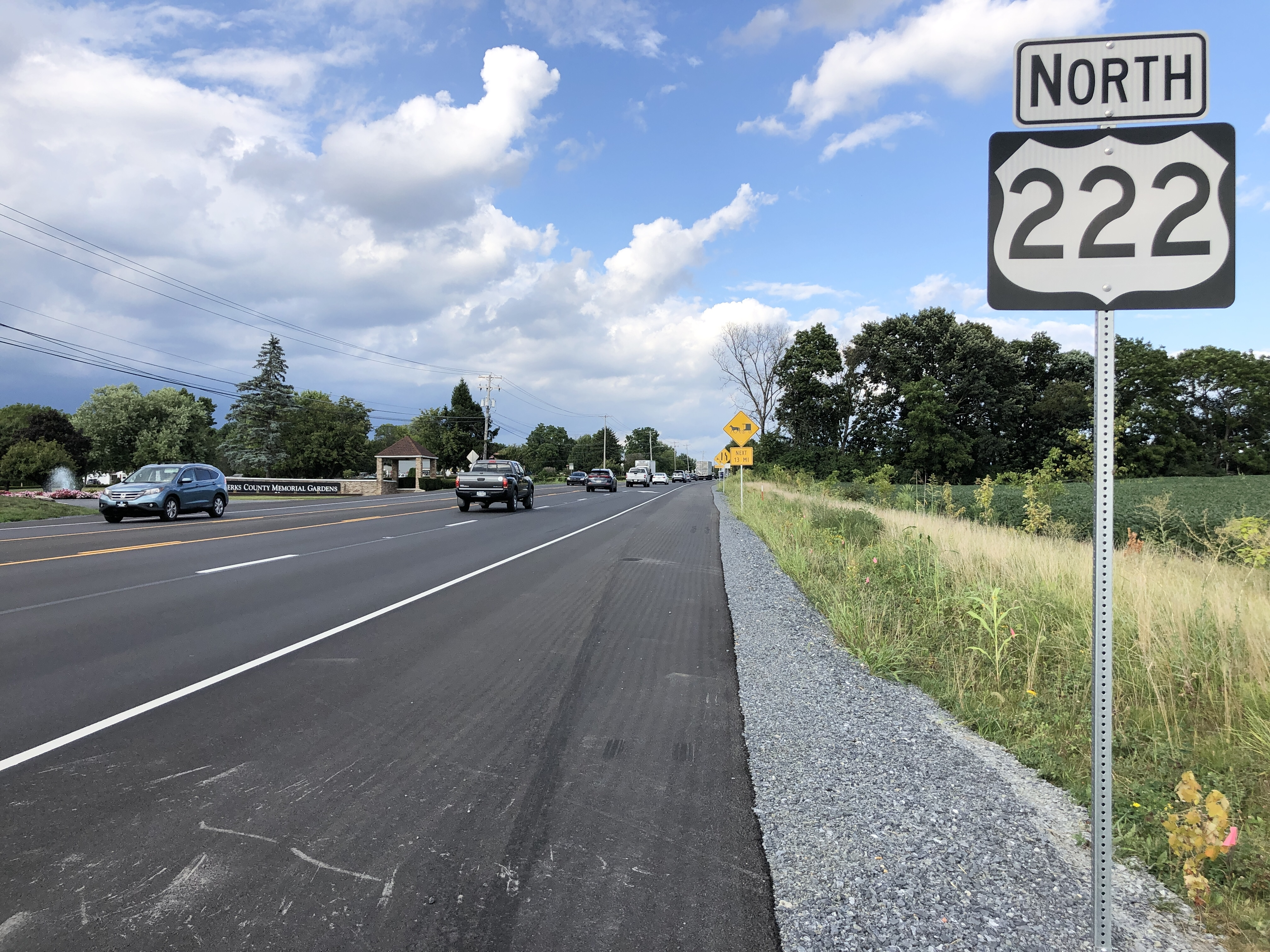
US 222 northbound in Maidencreek Township

As of 2022, there were 62.24 miles (100.17 km) of public roads in Maidencreek Township, of which 17.81 miles (28.66 km) were maintained by the Pennsylvania Department of Transportation (PennDOT) and 44.43 miles (71.50 km) were maintained by the township.

The principal roads are U.S. Route 222, PA Route 73, and Park Road. Berks Area Regional Transportation Authority (BARTA) serves the township with bus route 22 along the Park Road corridor, providing a route for workers to the East Penn Manufacturing Company plant in Lyons.

== Demographics ==
Historical population
Census	Pop.	Note	%±
1980	2,377		—
1990	3,397		42.9%
2000	6,553		92.9%
2010	9,126		39.3%
2016 (est.)	9,420		3.2%
Source: US Census Bureau

As of the 2000 census, of 2000, there were 6,553 people, 2,276 households, and 1,884 families residing in the township. The population density was 494.5 inhabitants per square mile (190.9/km^{2}). There were 2,357 housing units at an average density of 177.9 per square mile (68.7/km^{2}). The racial makeup of the township was 96.61% White, 0.89% African American, 0.06% Native American, 1.27% Asian, 0.55% from other races, and 0.63% from two or more races. Hispanic or Latino of any race were 2.29% of the population.

There were 2,276 households, out of which 43.6% had children under the age of 18 living with them, 72.5% were married couples living together, 6.6% had a female householder with no husband present, and 17.2% were non-families. 12.3% of all households were made up of individuals, and 4.2% had someone living alone who was 65 years of age or older. The average household size was 2.88 and the average family size was 3.15.

In the township, the population was spread out, with 28.7% under the age of 18, 6.2% from 18 to 24, 36.2% from 25 to 44, 20.7% from 45 to 64, and 8.3% who were 65 years of age or older. The median age was 35 years. For every 100 females, there were 100.3 males. For every 100 females age 18 and over, there were 98.3 males.

The median income for a household in the township was $62,724, and the median income for a family was $68,438. Males had a median income of $44,000 versus $30,373 for females. The per capita income for the township was $24,662. About 2.1% of families and 3.1% of the population were below the poverty line, including 3.4% of those under age 18 and 12.2% of those age 65 or over.

== Government ==
Maidencreek Township is a Pennsylvania second class township that includes four villages, Blandon, Evansville, Maidencreek, and Molltown. Emergency services are provided by the Northern Berks Regional Police Department, Blandon Fire Company, and Blandon Ambulance, all of which are dispatched by the Berks County Communications Center.

== Education ==
Maidencreek Creek is served by Fleetwood Area School District.
