= Fleetwood, Pennsylvania =

Borough in Pennsylvania, US

- Borough
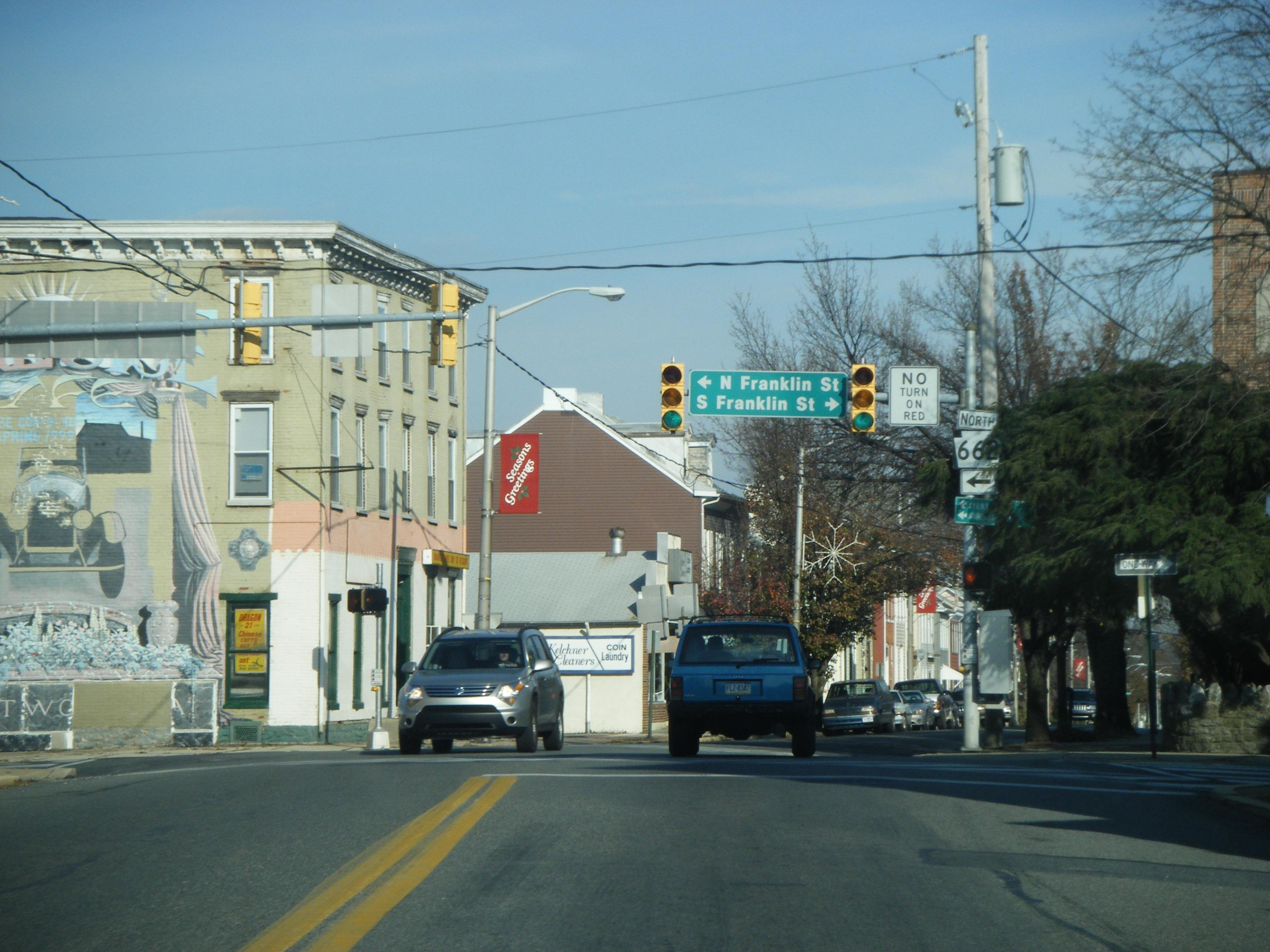
- Main Street in Fleetwood

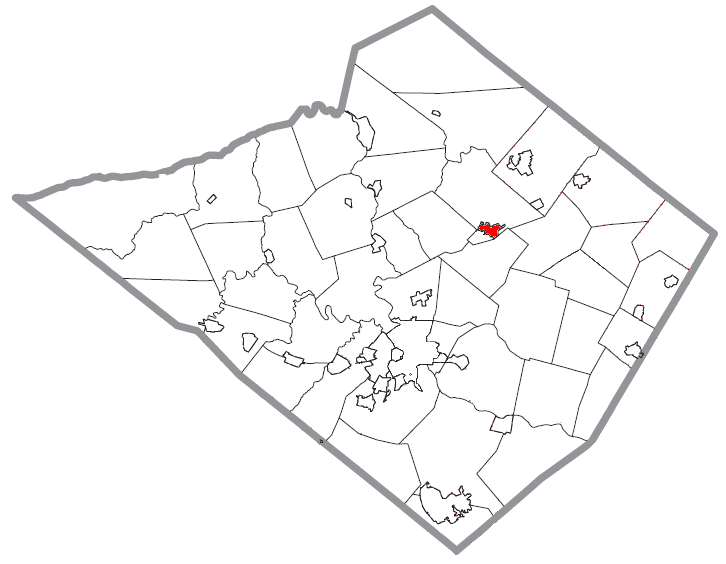
- Location of Fleetwood in Berks County, Pennsylvania

- Location of Fleetwood in Pennsylvania Fleetwood (the United States)
- Coordinates: 40°27′17″N 75°49′08″W
- Country: United States
- State: Pennsylvania
- County: Berks

Area
  - Total: 1.05 sq mi (2.72 km^{2})
  - Land: 1.04 sq mi (2.70 km^{2})
  - Water: 0.0039 sq mi (0.01 km^{2})
- Elevation: 433 ft (132 m)

Population (2020)
  - Total: 4,049
  - Density: 3,878.4/sq mi (1,497.46/km^{2})
- Time zone: UTC-5 (EST)
  - Summer (DST): UTC-4 (EDT)
- ZIP Code: 19522
- Area code: 610
- FIPS code: 42-26280
- Website: www.fleetwoodboro.com

Fleetwood, also called Schlegelschteddel in Pennsylvania Dutch, is a borough in Berks County, Pennsylvania, United States. The population was 4,049 at the 2020 census. It was home to the Fleetwood Metal Body company, an automobile coachbuilder purchased by Fisher Body and integrated into General Motors in 1931. The name lived on in the Cadillac Fleetwood automobile.

== History ==
The First National Bank in Fleetwood was listed on the National Register of Historic Places in 2005.

== Geography ==
Fleetwood is located northeast of the center of Berks County at 40°27′17″N 75°49′8″W (40.454793, -75.818821). It is bordered on the east, west, and north by Richmond Township and on its short southern edge by Ruscombmanor Township. According to the U.S. Census Bureau, the borough has a total area of 1.0 square mile (2.7 km^{2}), of which 0.004 square miles (0.01 km^{2}), or 0.47%, is water.

== Demographics ==
Historical population
Census	Pop.	Note	%±
1880	802		—
1890	878		9.5%
1900	978		11.4%
1910	1,394		42.5%
1920	1,652		18.5%
1930	2,150		30.1%
1940	2,254		4.8%
1950	2,338		3.7%
1960	2,647		13.2%
1970	3,064		15.8%
1980	3,422		11.7%
1990	3,478		1.6%
2000	4,018		15.5%
2010	4,085		1.7%
2020	4,049		−0.9%

=== 2020 census ===
As of the 2020 census, Fleetwood had a population of 4,049. The median age was 40.3 years. 21.5% of residents were under the age of 18 and 17.3% of residents were 65 years of age or older. For every 100 females there were 91.7 males, and for every 100 females age 18 and over there were 92.4 males age 18 and over.

100.0% of residents lived in urban areas, while 0.0% lived in rural areas.

There were 1,656 households in Fleetwood, of which 29.5% had children under the age of 18 living in them. Of all households, 50.3% were married-couple households, 16.7% were households with a male householder and no spouse or partner present, and 24.5% were households with a female householder and no spouse or partner present. About 26.7% of all households were made up of individuals and 12.0% had someone living alone who was 65 years of age or older.

There were 1,731 housing units, of which 4.3% were vacant. The homeowner vacancy rate was 1.1% and the rental vacancy rate was 5.9%.

Racial composition as of the 2020 census
Race	Number	Percent
White	3,617	89.3%
Black or African American	57	1.4%
American Indian and Alaska Native	8	0.2%
Asian	48	1.2%
Native Hawaiian and Other Pacific Islander	0	0.0%
Some other race	109	2.7%
Two or more races	210	5.2%
Hispanic or Latino (of any race)	290	7.2%

=== 2010 census ===
As of the census of 2010, there were 4,085 people, 1,662 households, and 1,134 families residing in the borough. There were 1,720 housing units of which 96.6% were occupied. The racial makeup of the borough was 95.81% White, 0.93% African American, 0.83% Asian, 0.73% from other races, and 1.69% from two or more races.

There were 1,662 households, out of which 30.7% had children under the age of 18 living with them, 54.3% were married couples living together, 9.3% had a female householder with no husband present, and 31.8% were non-families. 25.3% of all households were made up of individuals living alone. The average household size was 2.44 and the average family size was 2.92.

In the borough the population was spread out, with 22.1% under the age of 18, 8.8% from 18 to 24, 26.3% from 25 to 44, 26.5% from 45 to 64, and 16.3% who were 65 years of age or older. The median age was 39.9 years. For every 100 females there were 95.5 males. For every 100 females age 18 and over, there were 112.5 males.

=== 2000 census ===
The following statistics are from the 2000 census The median income for a household in the borough was $48,621, and the median income for a family was $60,051. Males had a median income of $39,559 versus $26,321 for females. The per capita income for the borough was $21,600. About 2.5% of families and 2.8% of the population were below the poverty line, including 3.5% of those under age 18 and 8.1% of those age 65 or over.

=== Religion ===
An Old Order Mennonite community resides near Fleetwood. The Old Order Mennonites in the area belong to the Groffdale Conference Mennonite Church and use the horse and buggy as transportation. There are several farms in the area belonging to the Old Order Mennonite community and a meetinghouse is located near Fleetwood. The Old Order Mennonites first bought land in the area in 1949.

== Education ==
The community is served by the Fleetwood Area School District, which operates Fleetwood Area High School, Fleetwood Area Middle School, and two elementary schools: Andrew Maier Elementary School and Willow Creek Elementary School. Richmond Elementary School was closed at the end of the 2018–2019 school year.

== Transportation ==
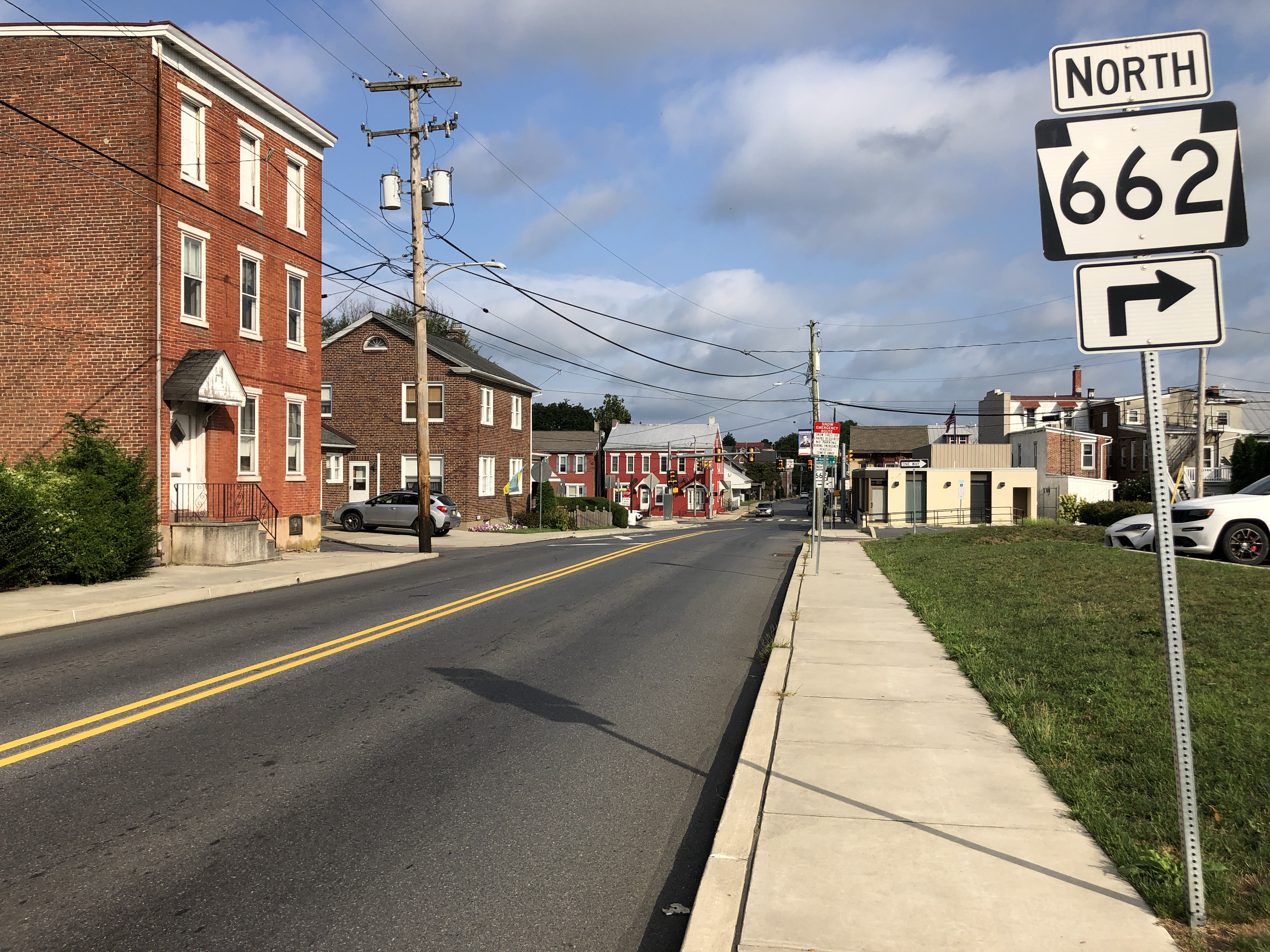
PA 662 northbound in Fleetwood

As of 2020, there were 18.85 miles (30.34 km) of public roads in Fleetwood, of which 2.00 miles (3.22 km) were maintained by the Pennsylvania Department of Transportation (PennDOT) and 16.85 miles (27.12 km) were maintained by the borough.

Pennsylvania Route 662 passes north–south through the borough, leading north toward U.S. Route 222 and south to Oley and Douglassville. By Park Road it is 12 miles (19 km) southwest to Reading. Berks Area Regional Transportation Authority (BARTA) provides bus service to Fleetwood along Route 22, which provides a route for workers to the East Penn Manufacturing Company plant in Lyons. Norfolk Southern Railway's Reading Line freight railroad line passes east–west through Fleetwood.

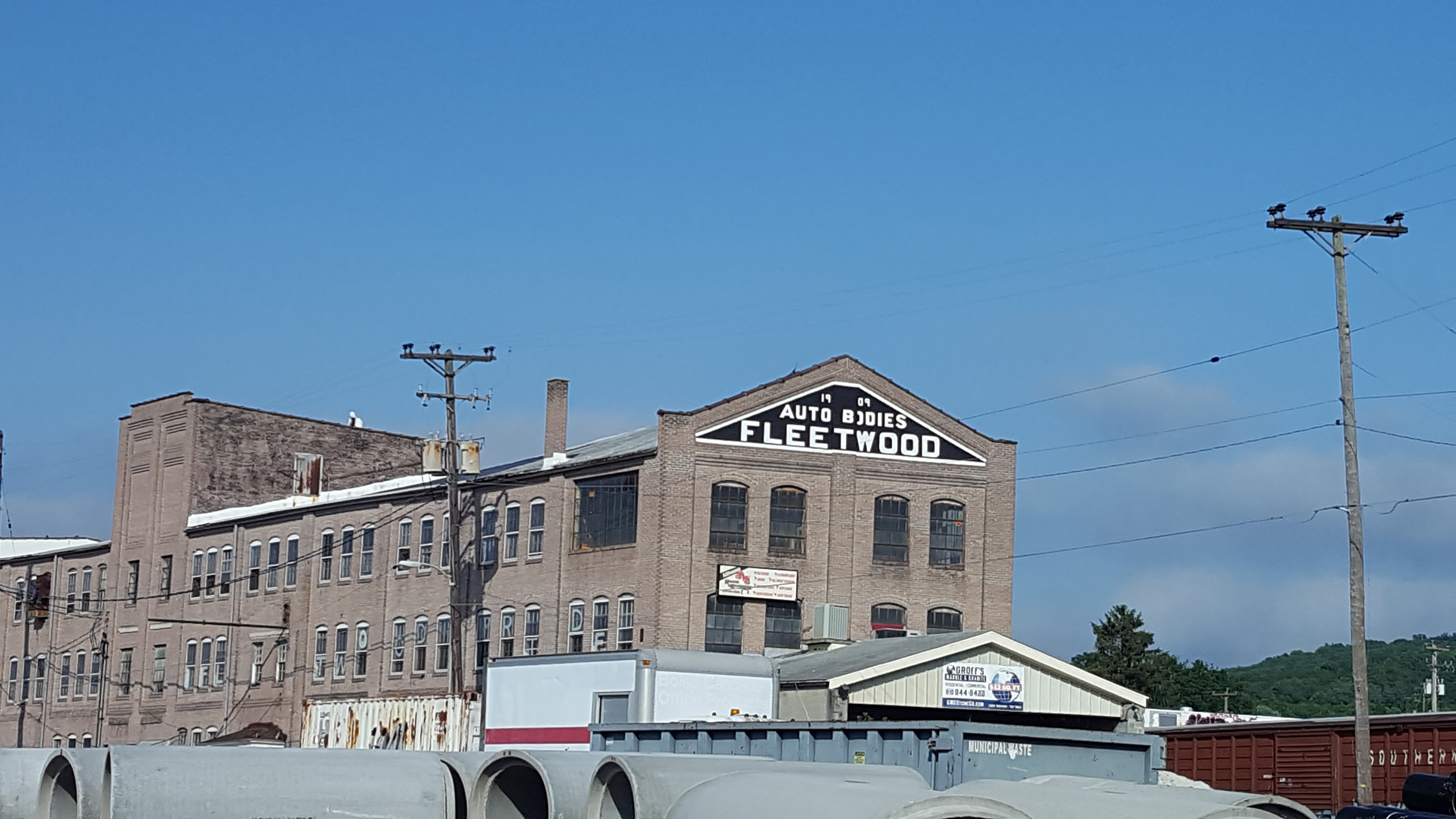
Fleetwood Metal Body Works

== Town twinnings ==
Fleetwood is twinned with the town of Fleetwood in Lancashire, in the United Kingdom.

== Popular culture ==
- Jimmy Stewart often visited Fleetwood.
- The second episode of season one of Debris on NBC takes place on Washington Street in Fleetwood.

== Notable residents ==
- Jonathan Bean (born 1979), children's book author and illustrator
- Sam Mattis (born 1994), Olympic discus thrower
