= Blandon, Pennsylvania =

Unincorporated community in Pennsylvania, US

- Census-designated place
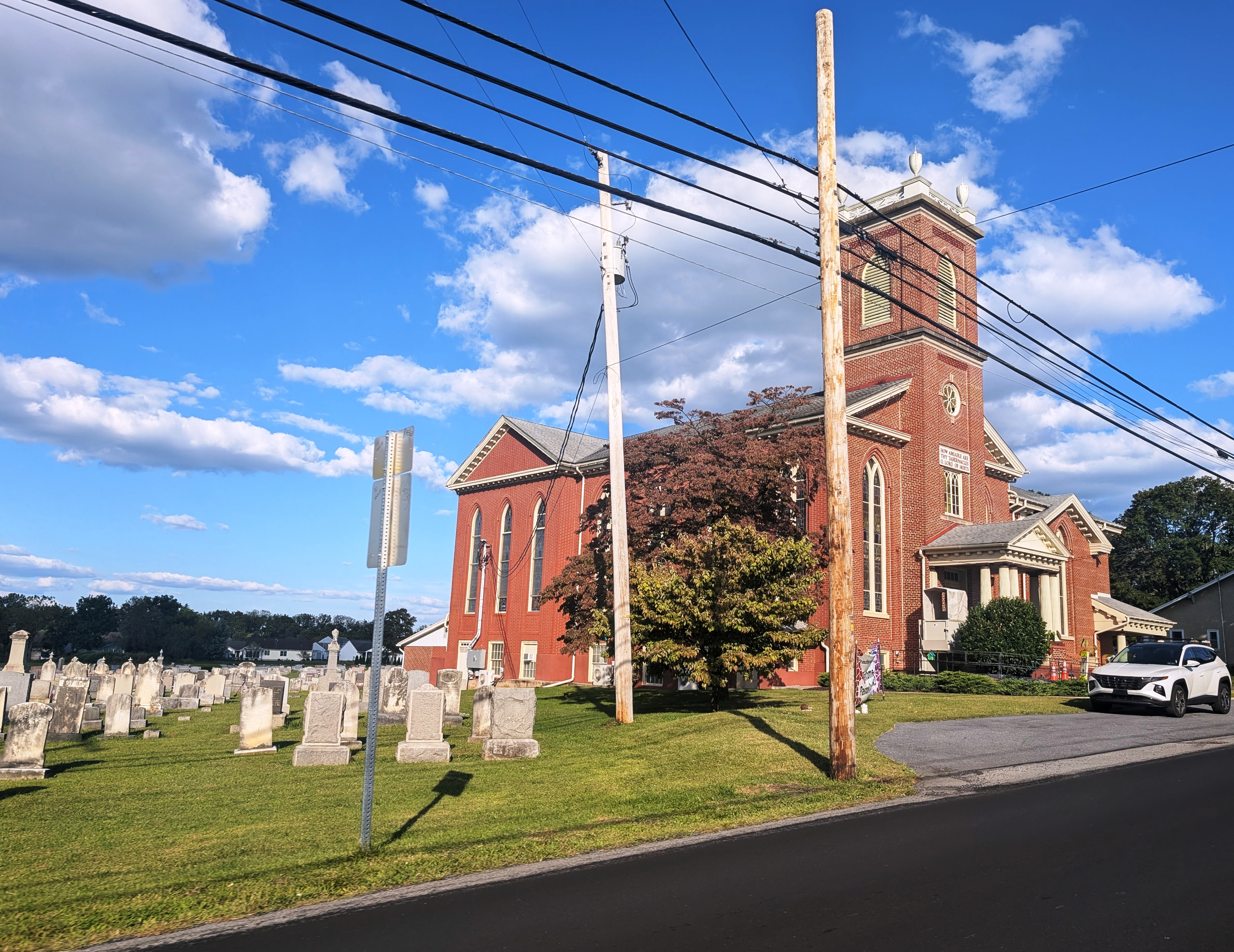
- Maidencreek Church and cemetery in Blandon

- Location within Pennsylvania
- Coordinates: 40°26′28″N 75°53′13″W
- Country: United States
- State: Pennsylvania
- County: Berks
- Township: Maidencreek

Area
  - Total: 4.44 sq mi (11.51 km^{2})
  - Land: 4.44 sq mi (11.49 km^{2})
  - Water: 0.0077 sq mi (0.02 km^{2})
- Elevation: 381 ft (116 m)

Population (2020)
  - Total: 7,289
  - Density: 1,642.5/sq mi (634.16/km^{2})
- Time zone: UTC-5 (Eastern (EST))
  - Summer (DST): UTC-4 (EDT)
- ZIP code: 19510
- Area codes: 610 and 484
- FIPS code: 42-06984
- GNIS feature ID: 1169811

Blandon is a census-designated place in Maidencreek Township, Berks County, Pennsylvania, United States. It is located at the junction of Pennsylvania Route 73 and Park Road. As of the 2020 census, the population was 7,289 residents.

Historical population
Census	Pop.	Note	%±
2020	7,289		—
U.S. Decennial Census

== History ==
A post office called Blandon has been in operation since 1862. Sources differ whether the community was named for H. Willis Bland, a county judge, or for Robert Bland, an original owner of the town site.
