= Yasir Salem =

American triathlete, cyclist, and competitive eater

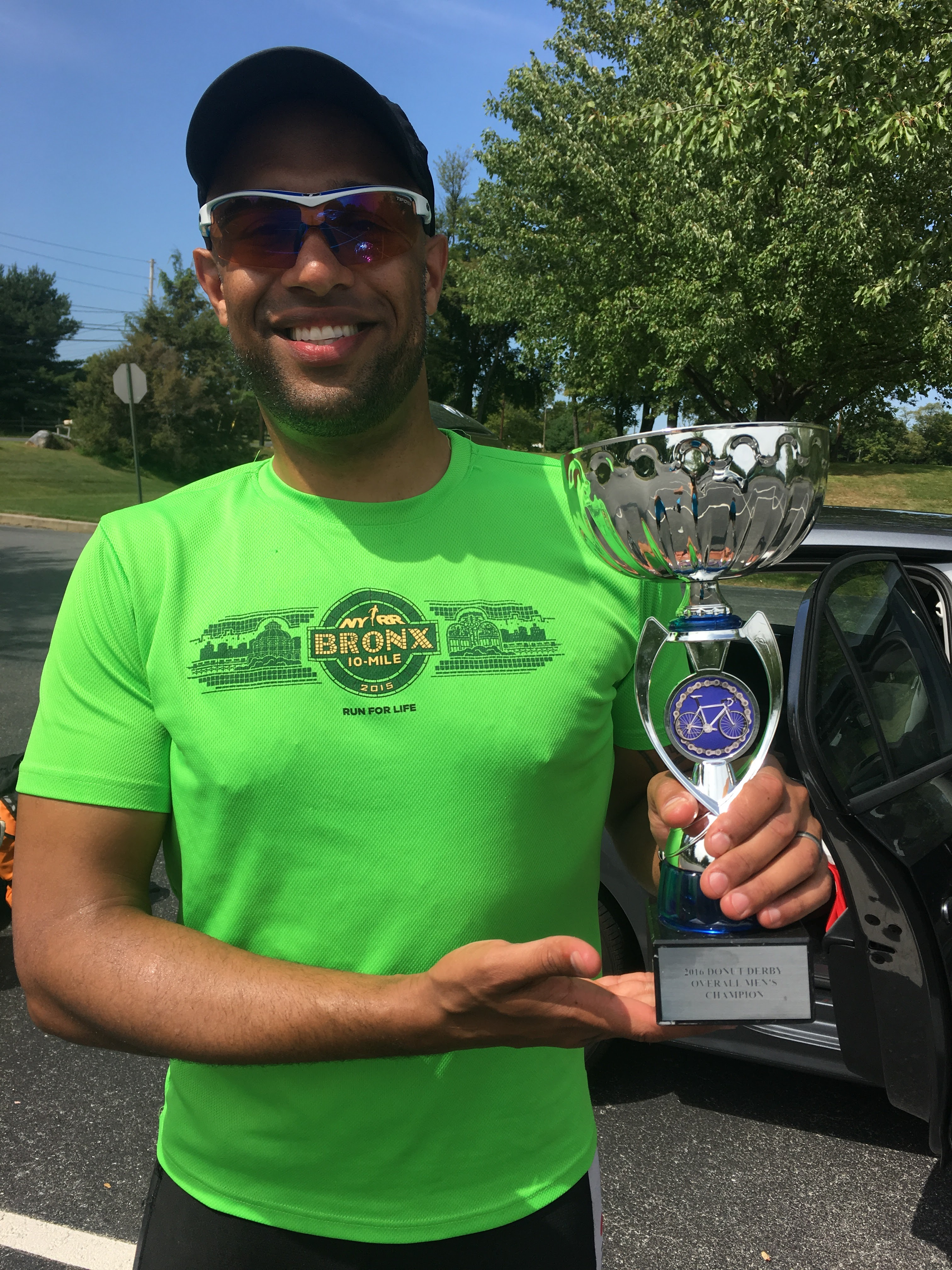
- Yasir Salem after winning the 2015 Donut Derby bicycle race
- Born: Yasir Salem; Houston, Texas
- Education: University of Texas at Austin (BA, Economics). Rutgers University (MBA)
- Occupations: Marketing Director, Competitive Eater
- Known for: Tour de Donut champion, Donut Derby, competitive eating

Yasir Salem is an American triathlete, marathon enthusiast, cyclist, and competitive eater. He in 2017 was ranked number 11 in Major League Eating’s list of competitive eaters.

Salem is the Tour de Donut and the Donut Derby champion. He is also the former National Sweet Corn Eating champion and world record-holder (47 ears of corn in 12 minutes), and has competed in the Nathan’s Hot Dog Eating Contest five times.

Salem frequently appears in the media to discuss his competitions and activities in outlets such as Runner's World magazine, Bicycling magazine, Triathlete magazine, Men's Health magazine, Men's Fitness magazine, ESPN, Muscle & Fitness, Women's Health, The Wall Street Journal, Bloomberg, MSNBC, ABC.

== Biography ==
Salem was born in Houston, Texas. He is of Egyptian, Turkish and Armenian ancestry. He attended Clear Lake High School in Houston, Texas, and went on to earn a Bachelor of Arts in Economics at the University of Texas at Austin, as well as an MBA at Rutgers University in New Brunswick, New Jersey.

Salem’s first Major League Eating win was at the Nathan’s Hot Dog Eating Contest Qualifier in Concord, North Carolina in 2012. His first Major League Eating title came in September 2013, when he ate 31.75 cannoli at Little Italy’s Feast of San Gennaro Cannoli Eating Championship. Salem’s first Tour de Donut championship was the Tour de Donut Ohio in 2014.

== Tour de Donut and Donut Derby ==
=== Tour de Donut ===
Salem has competed in several Tour de Donut road races across America. Each city’s annual bicycle race has cyclists race for 30 miles to earn the lowest times by eating donuts at two pit stops along the track. For each donut consumed, riders’ times are reduced by five minutes. Rather than award the first cyclist to cross the finish line, the champion with the lowest "donut-adjusted time" is named the winner of the race. Salem eats 12 donuts at a time during the races.

Cities and years competed:

- Ohio: 2014, 2015, 2016, 2017
- Utah: 2014, 2015
- Illinois: 2014, 2015, 2016, 2017, 2022, 2024
- Austin: 2016, 2017

=== Donut Derby ===
Salem competed in Pennsylvania’s Donut Derby bicycle race in 2015, 2016 and 2017, achieving his best "donut style" bicycle race by eating 61 donuts over 36 miles for a donut-adjusted time of -31 minutes.

== Competitive eating ==
Salem’s entry into the competitive eating scene started as something of a joke. "I was watching the Nathan’s contest in 2008, and I thought, ‘Wow, all I have to do is eat a bunch of hot dogs and I can be on ESPN?’" he told Mental Floss. He trains by eating a 4 to 6 pounds salad every day for lunch followed by a gallon of water. He credits enlisting the help of a hypnotherapist as a key turning point in his success as a competitive eater.

== Triathlete, runner, and cyclist ==
Salem ran and completed his first marathon in the 2010 New York City Marathon. By June 2017, he had completed 20.

He competed in his first New York City Triathlon in 2012, having only learned to swim that same year. He then competed in his first Ironman in 2013, and would complete four total by 2015.

Salem owns 3 bicycles, and is known to use a Quintana Roo PR6 Ultegra Di2 with Reynolds Strike wheels for triathlons.

He has stated his intent to run one marathon each month in 2017, and is currently training for the 2018 Race Across the West and the 2019 Race Across America ultra-endurance bicycle races, which are 900 and 3,000 miles, respectively.

== Championships and world records held ==
=== 2013 ===
- Cannoli: 31.75 cannoli / 6 minutes (New York City, New York, September 13, 2013) at Feast of San Gennaro World Cannoli Eating Championship

=== 2014 ===
- Donut Dash 5K champion: Donut-adjusted time of 3 minutes, 15 seconds / 22 donuts (Dayton, Ohio, June 28, 2014)
- Tour de Donut Ohio ‘Double D’ champion: Donut-adjusted time of -32 minutes, 45 seconds / 48 donuts (Arcanum, Ohio, September 6, 2014)
- Utah Tour de Donut Donut King: Donut-adjusted time of -27 minutes / 40 donuts (American Fork, Utah, September 27, 2014)

=== 2015 ===
- Tour de Donut Illinois champion: Donut-adjusted time of -1 hour, 36 minutes, 40 seconds / 50 donuts (Staunton, Illinois, July 11, 2015)
- Tour de Donut Ohio ‘Double D’ champion: Donut-adjusted time of 71 minutes, 51 seconds / 44 donuts (Arcanum, Ohio, September 12, 2015)
- Donut Derby champion: Donut-adjusted time of -35 minutes, 6 seconds / 54 donuts (Breinigsville, Pennsylvania, September 7, 2015)
- Utah Tour de Donut Donut King: Donut-adjusted time of -14 minutes, 6 seconds / 36 donuts (American Fork, Utah, September 19, 2015)

=== 2016 ===
- Corn on the cob world record: 47 corn / 12 minutes (West Palm Beach, Florida, April 24, 2016) at National Sweet Corn Eating Championship
- Tour de Donut Illinois champion: Donut-adjusted time of -30 minutes, 41 seconds / 39 donuts (Staunton, Illinois, July 9, 2016)
- Tour de Donut Ohio champion: Donut-adjusted time of -33 minutes, 15 seconds / 36 donuts (Arcanum, Ohio, September 10, 2016)
- Donut Derby champion: Donut-adjusted time of -9 minutes, 3 seconds / 55 donuts (Breinigsville, Pennsylvania, September 5, 2016)
- Tour de Donut Austin champion: Donut-adjusted time of -1 hour, 19 minutes / 31 donuts (Austin, Texas, November 13, 2016)

=== 2017 ===
- Tour de Donut Illinois donut king: Donut-adjusted time of -8 minutes, 46 seconds / 40 donuts (Staunton, Illinois, July 8, 2017)
- Donut Derby champion: Donut-adjusted time of -31 minutes / 61 donuts (Breinigsville, Pennsylvania, September 4, 2017)
- Tour de Donut Ohio champion: Donut-adjusted time of -50 minutes, 37 seconds / 44 donuts (Troy, Ohio, September 16, 2017)
- Tour de Donut Austin champion: Donut-adjusted time of -1 hour, 45 minutes / 37 donuts (Austin, Texas, November 12, 2017)

=== 2022 ===
- Tour de Donut Illinois champion: Donut-adjusted time of 14 minutes, 43 seconds / 24 donuts (Staunton, Illinois, July 9, 2022)

=== 2024 ===
- Tour de Donut Illinois champion: Donut-adjusted time of 9 minutes, 0 seconds / 28 donuts (Staunton, Illinois, July 13, 2024)

== Personal life ==
Salem resides in New York City and his two cats. His wife, Gweneviere Mann, a non-smoker, died on July 22, 2018, from lung cancer. She was 47.

He currently serves as Director, Group Marketing at Hearst for Esquire, Popular Mechanics, Car and Driver, and Road &Track.

Salem’s hobbies include growing and eating his own supply of organic fruits, vegetables, microgreens, and sprouts in his NYC home.

== See also ==
List of competitive eaters
