= Siegfried's Dale Farm =

- U.S. National Register of Historic Places
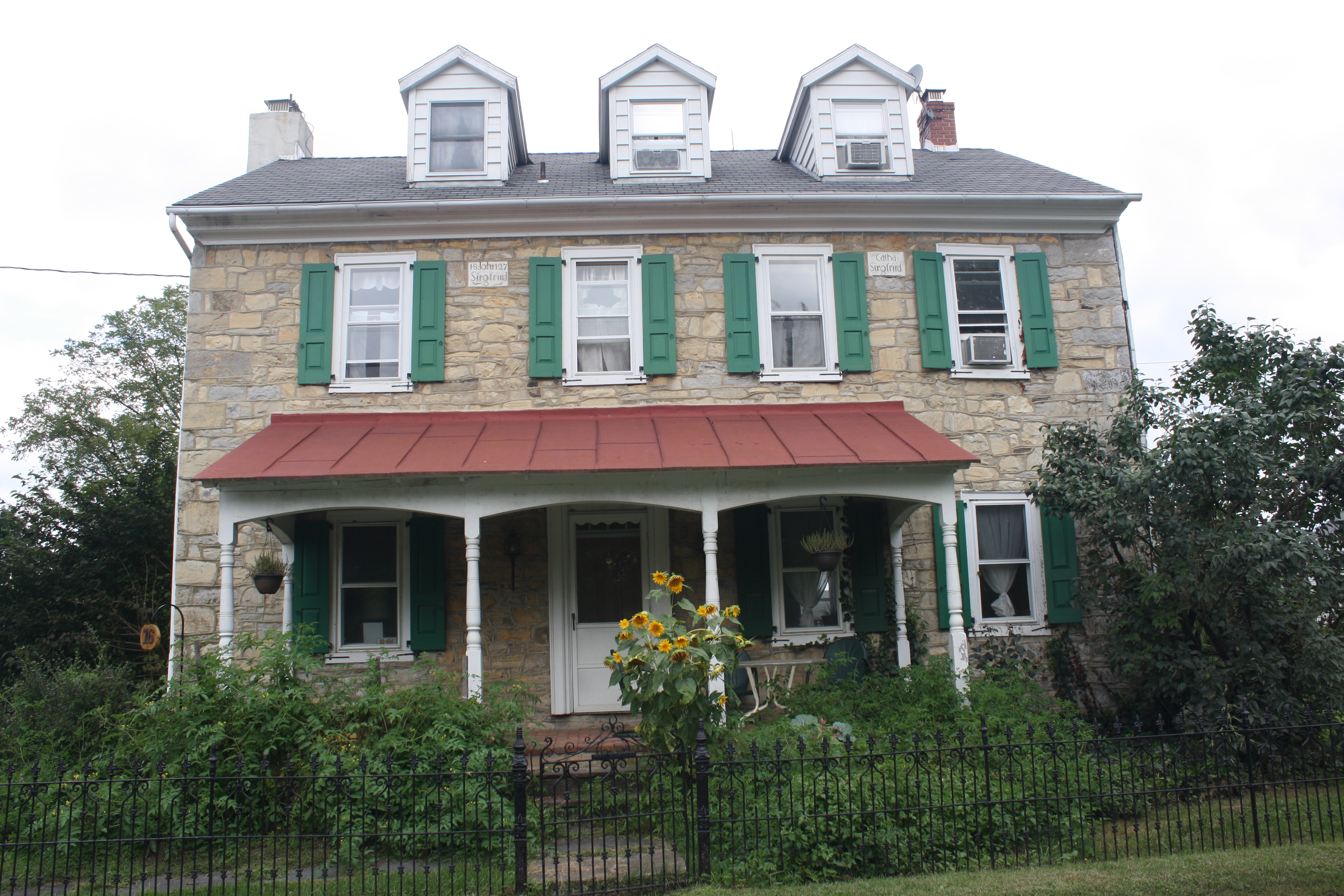
- John and Catherina Siegfried House, September 2013.

- Location within Pennsylvania Location within the United States
- Location: 611 Siegfriedale Road, Maxatawny Township, Pennsylvania
- Coordinates: 40°32′58″N 75°43′23″W
- Area: 37 acres (15 ha)
- Built: 1790, 1819, 1827, 1906
- NRHP reference No.: 84003115
- Added to NRHP: May 10, 1984

Siegfried's Dale Farm, also known as the Rodale Research Center or Rodale Institute, is an historic home and farm complex that is located in Maxatawny Township, Pennsylvania, United States.

It was listed on the National Register of Historic Places in 1984.

== History and architectural features ==
This property includes thirteen contributing buildings, a contributing structure and three houses that were built between 1790 and 1827, the John and Catherina Siegfried Bank barn (1819, 1905), calving barn (c. 1900), two small barns (c. 1860 and c. 1900), a corn crib, the Henry Siegfried Bank barn (mid-nineteenth century), a spring and rendering house (c. 1790 and c. 1880), a one-story brick school house (1906), a smokehouse (c. 1820), and a carriage house (c. 1880).

The John and Catherina Siegfried house (1790) is a 2 1/2-story, four-bay, rubble stone house with a slate gable roof. The Henry Siegfried house (1827) is a 2 1/2-story, five-bay, rubble stone house that was designed in the Georgian style. The Johannes Siegfried house (1790) is a 2 1/2-story, four-bay, sided rubble stone dwelling with a three-bay Victorian porch.

Moravian settler Johannes Siegfried acquired the property in 1732. It remained in the Siegfried family until being acquired in 1971 by The Rodale Institute.

It was listed on the National Register of Historic Places in 1984.

== Gallery ==
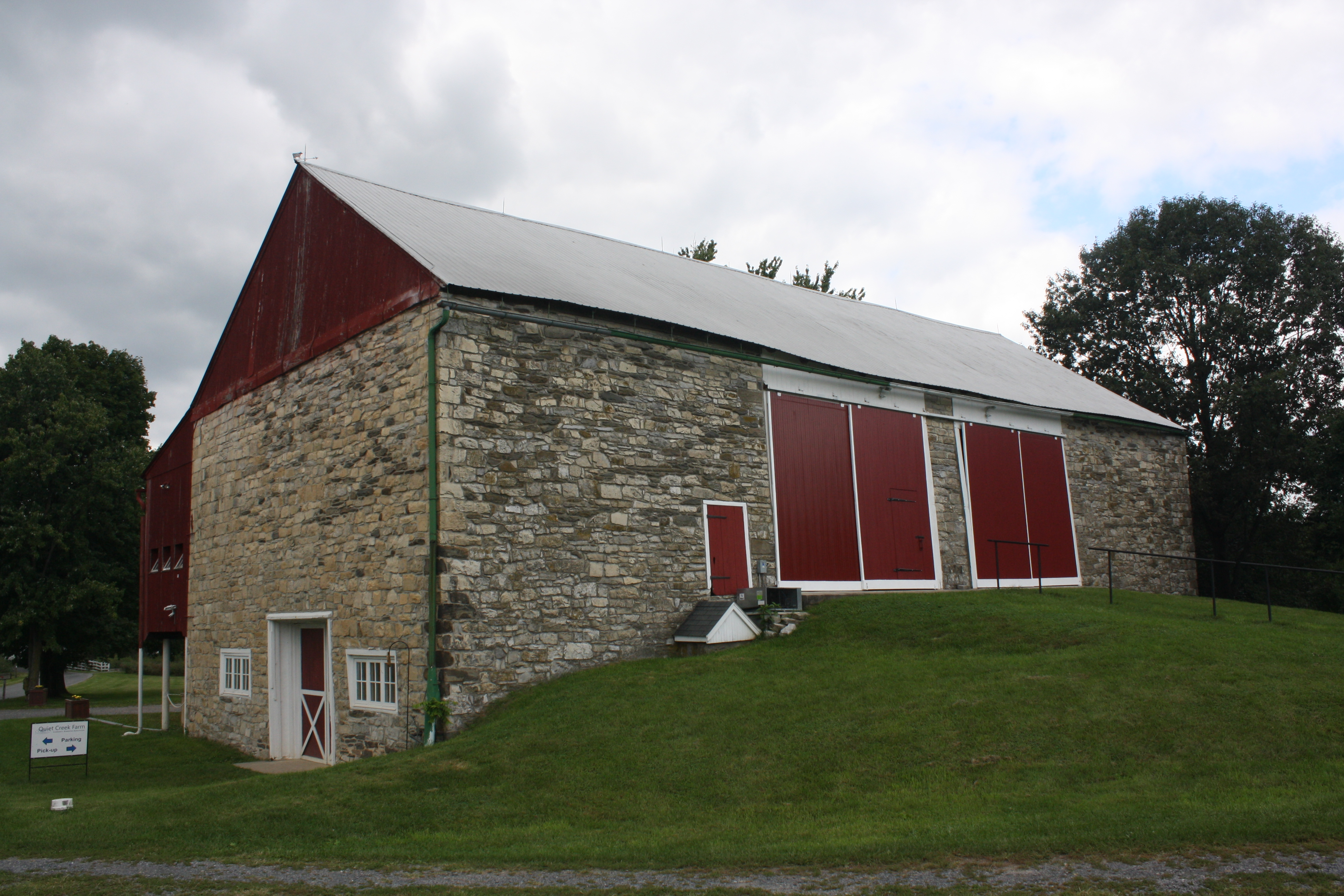
Henry Siegfried Barn

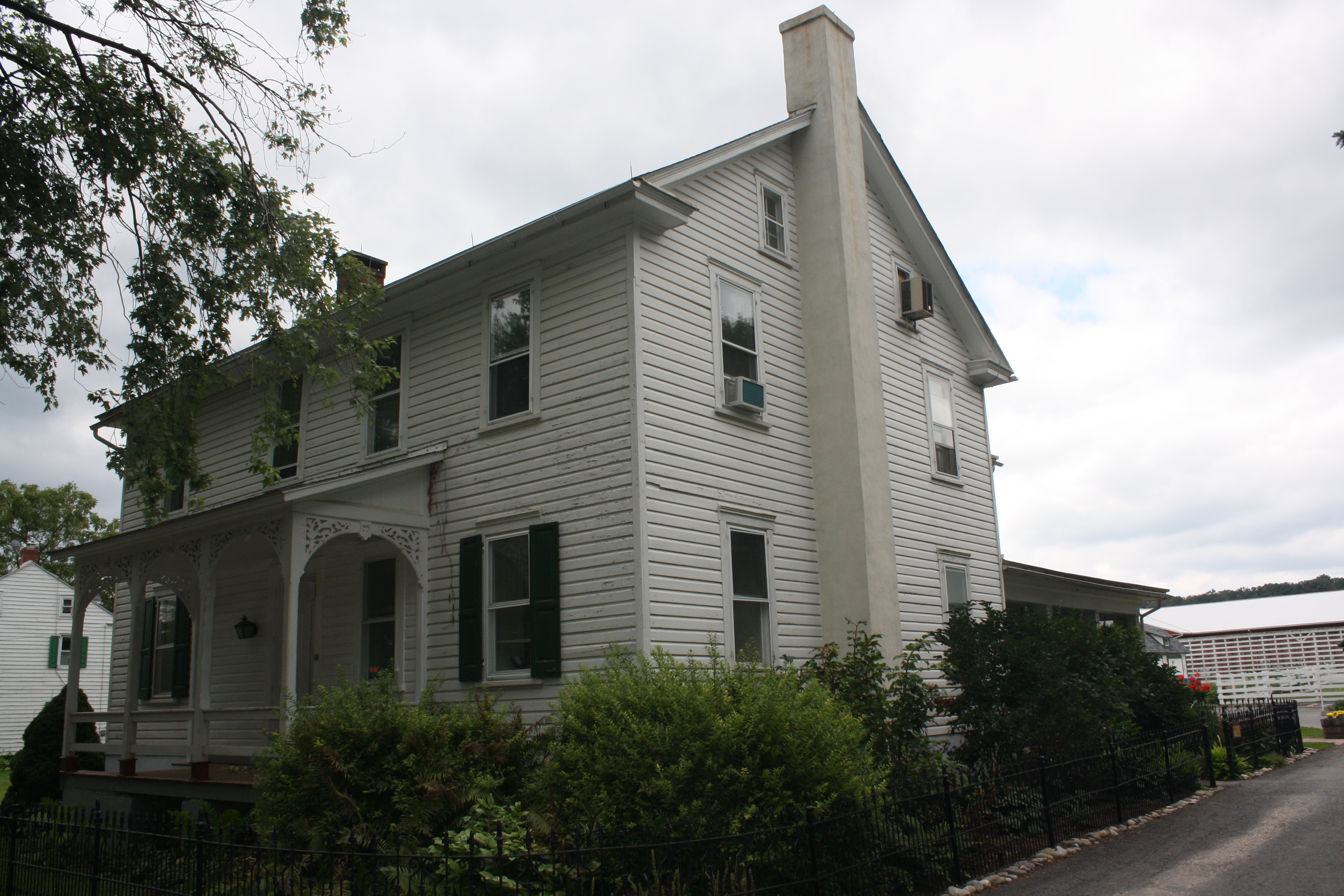
Johannes and Gertraud Siegfried House

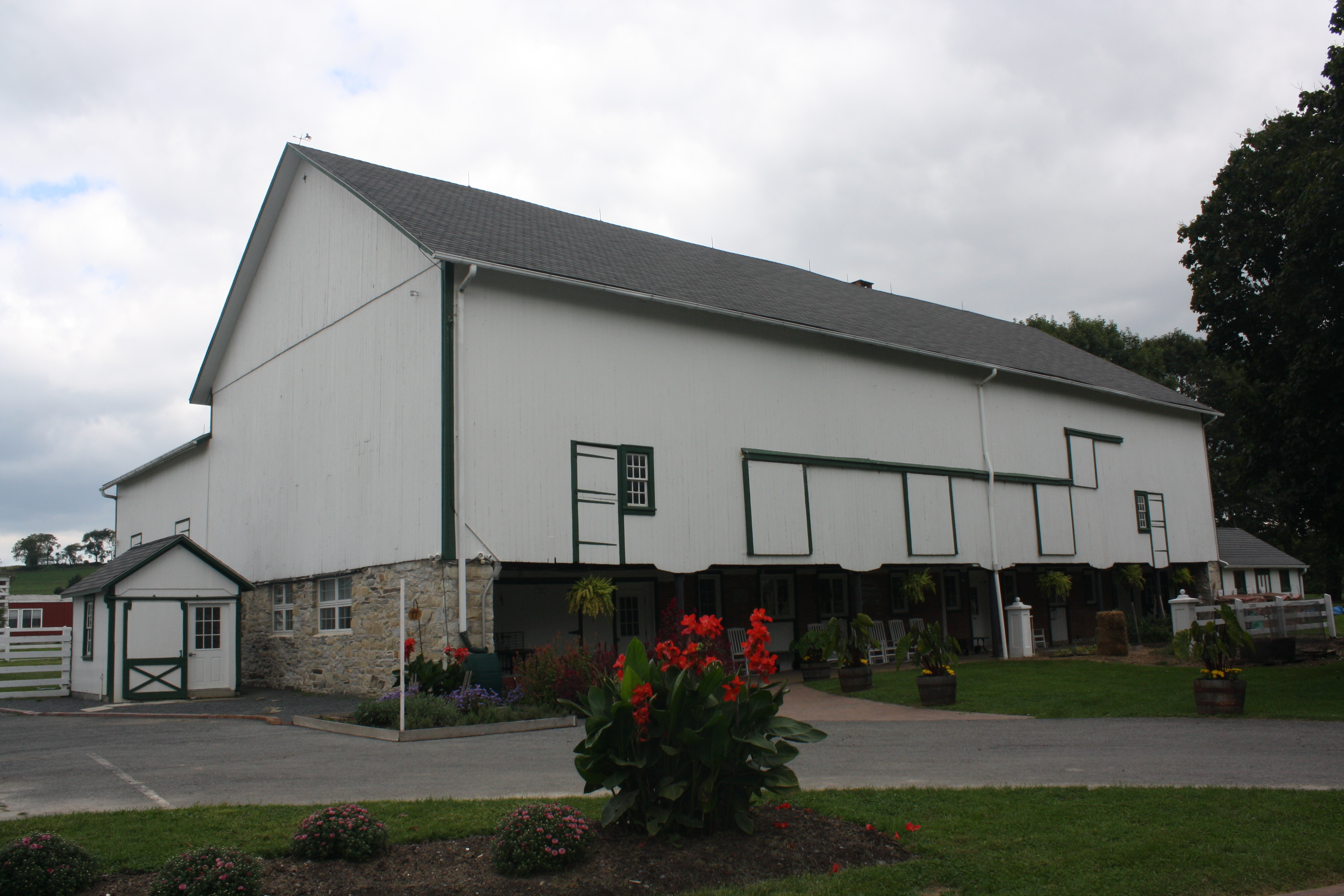
John and Catherina Siegfried Barn

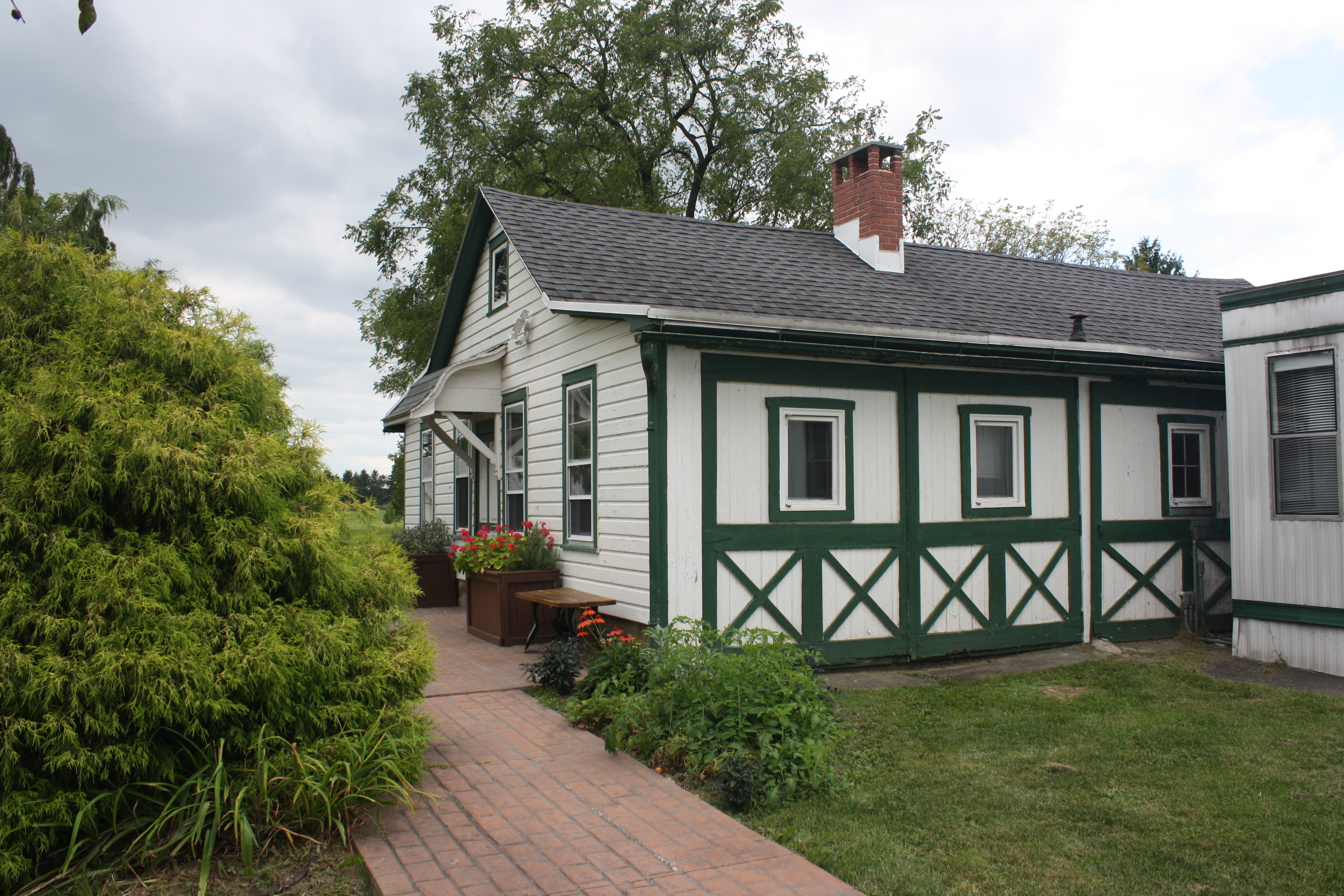
Calving barn

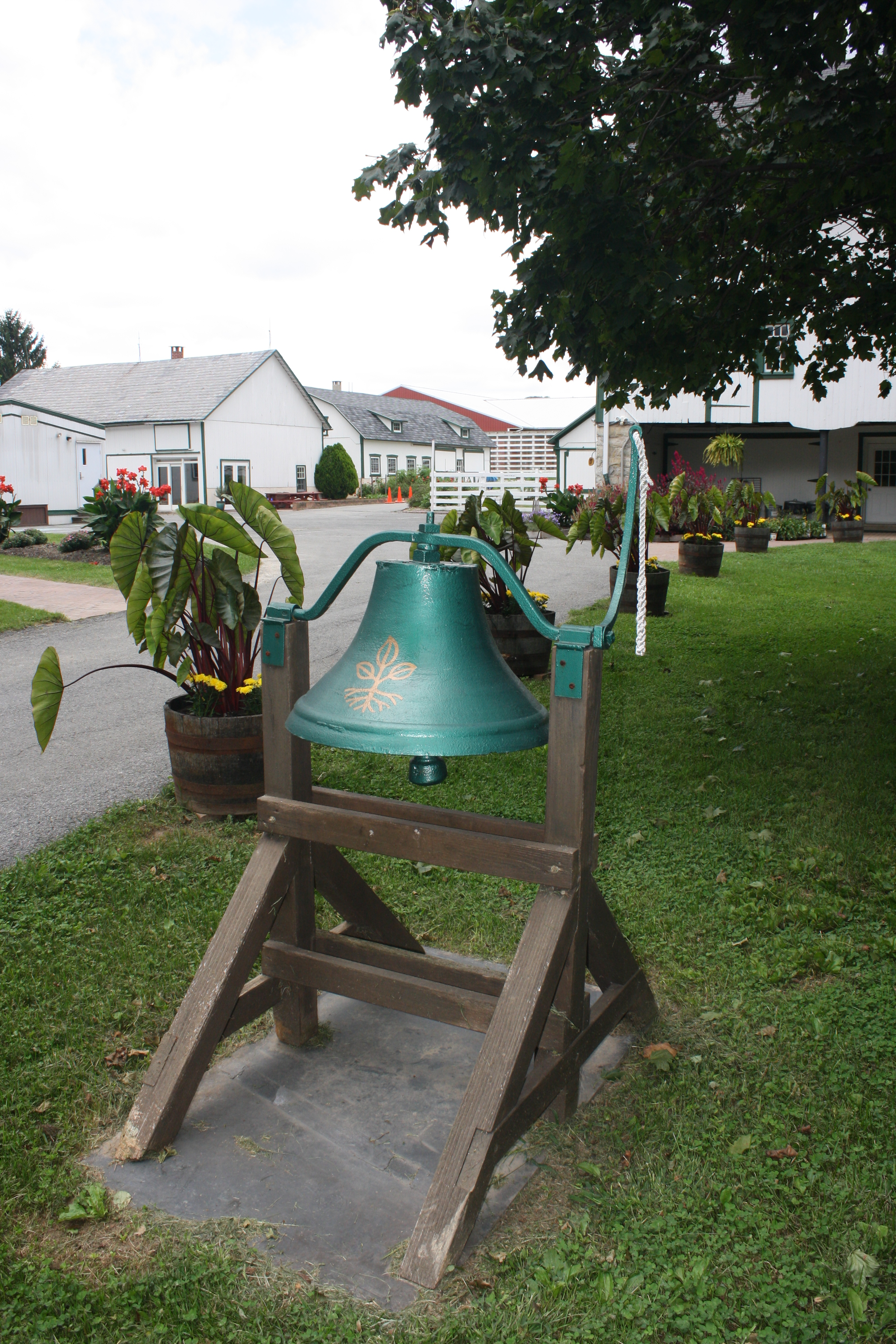
Bell at path to barnyard
