= Bowers, Pennsylvania =

Unincorporated community in Pennsylvania, US

- Census-designated place
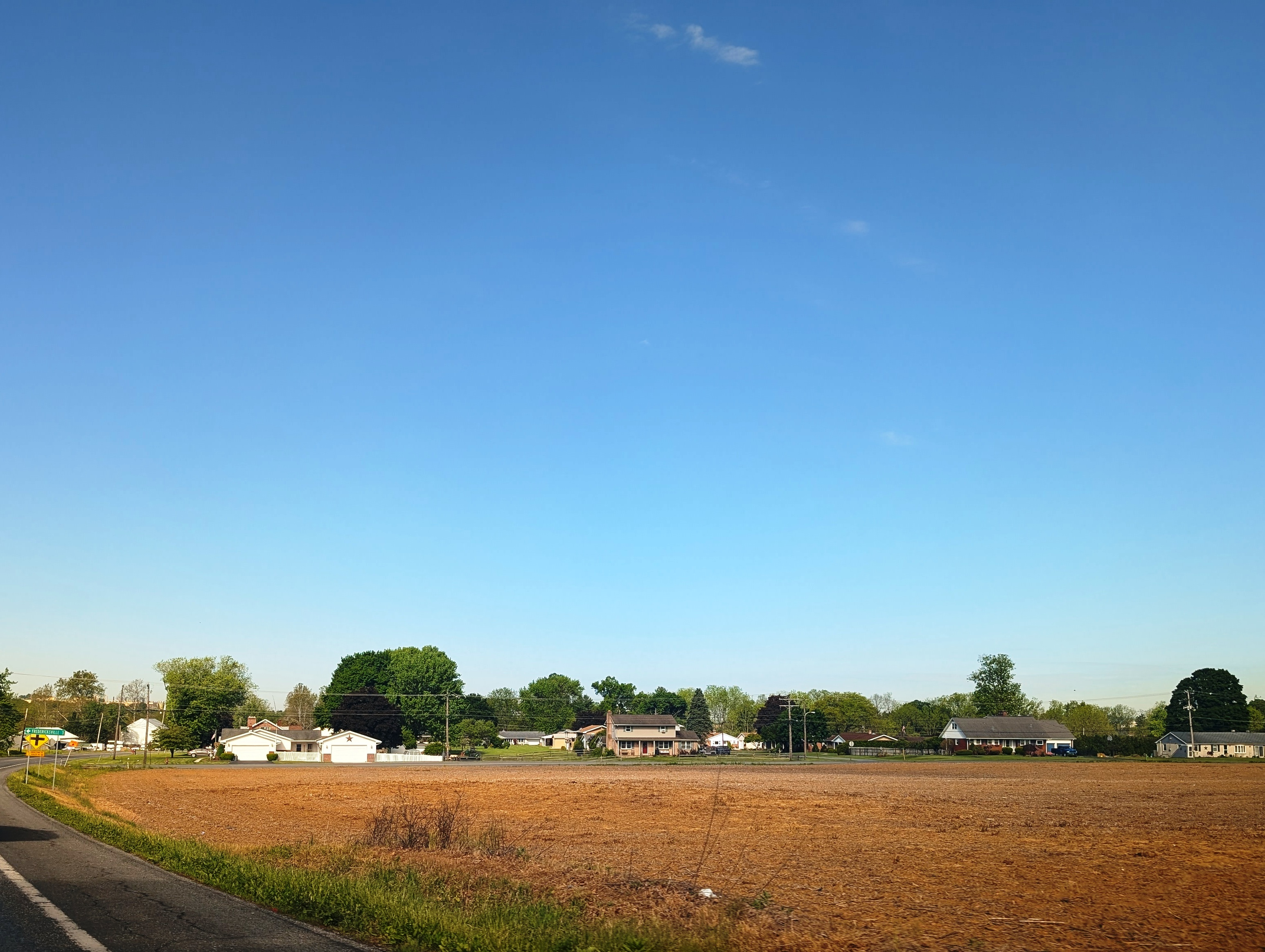
- Houses along Kohler Road in Bowers

- Location within Pennsylvania Location within the United States
- Coordinates: 40°29′14″N 75°44′32″W
- Country: United States
- State: Pennsylvania
- County: Berks
- Township: Maxatawny

Area
  - Total: 0.61 sq mi (1.58 km^{2})
  - Land: 0.61 sq mi (1.57 km^{2})
  - Water: 0 sq mi (0.00 km^{2})
- Elevation: 449 ft (137 m)

Population (2020)
  - Total: 355
  - Density: 584.1/sq mi (225.53/km^{2})
- Time zone: UTC-5 (Eastern (EST))
  - Summer (DST): UTC-4 (EDT)
- ZIP Codes: 19511 & 19539
- Area codes: 610 & 484
- FIPS code: 42-07800
- GNIS feature ID: 1170048

Bowers is a census-designated place in Maxatawny Township, Berks County, Pennsylvania.

Bowers is located near the borough of Lyons and is on Sacony Creek, a tributary of the Maiden Creek. As of the 2020 census, the population was 355 residents. Although Bowers has its own post office with the ZIP code of 19511, some residents are served by the Mertztown post office with the ZIP code of 19539.

Historical population
Census	Pop.	Note	%±
2020	355		—
U.S. Decennial Census

== History ==
Bowers was founded in 1860, the same year the railroad was extended to Bowers. The community was named for the local Bower family.
