= Lyons, Pennsylvania =

Borough in Pennsylvania, US

Lyons, Pennsylvania Lyon Station
- Borough
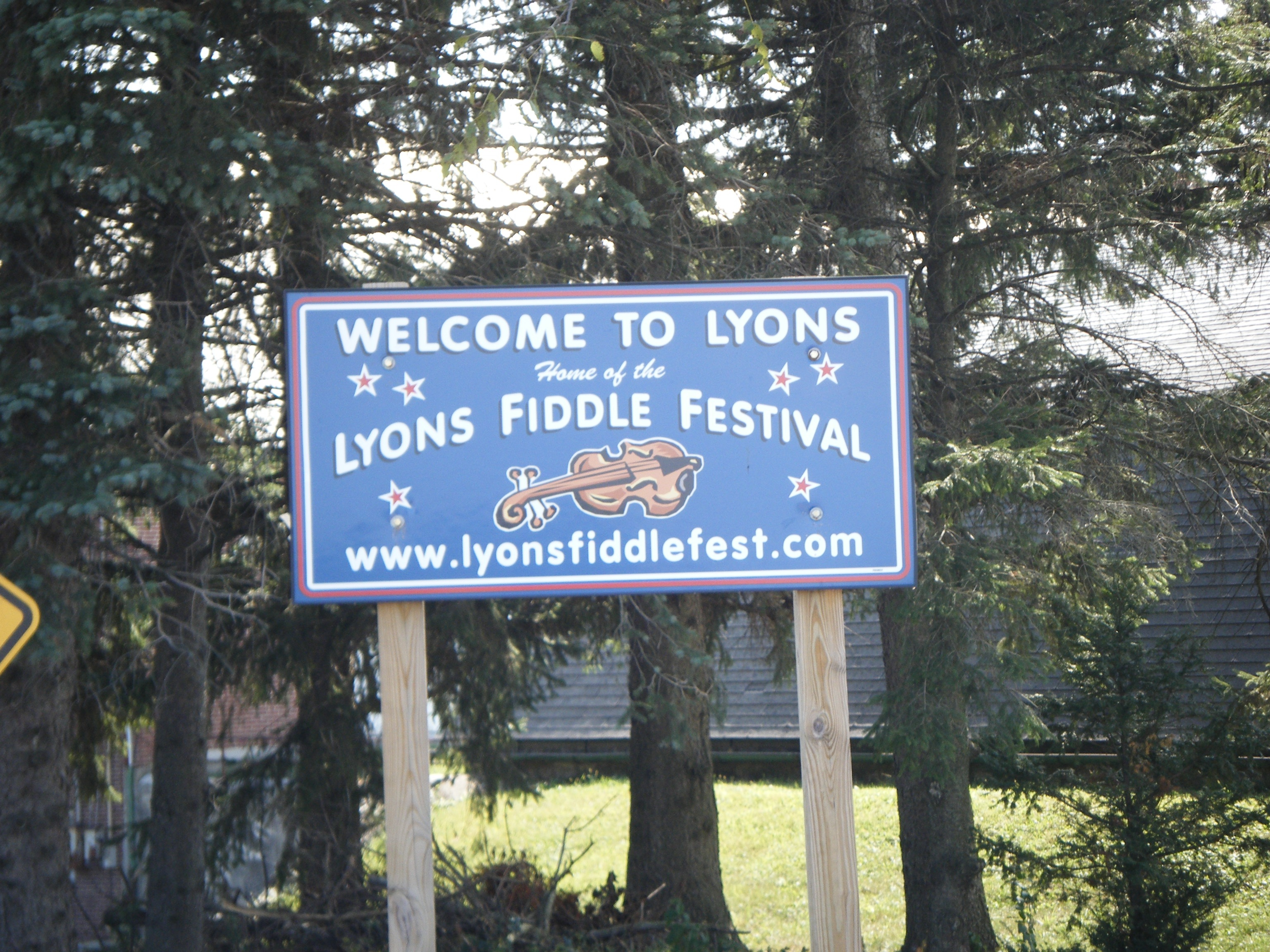
- Lyons welcome sign

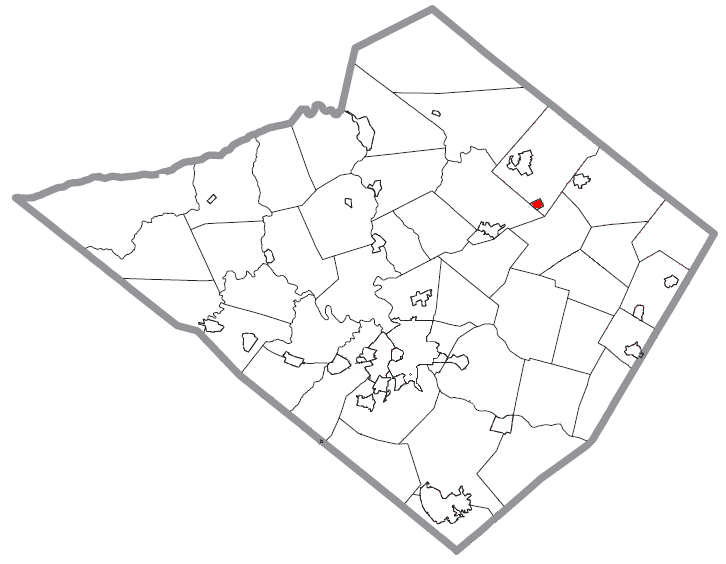
- Location of Lyons in Berks County, Pennsylvania.

- Location of Lyons in Pennsylvania Lyons (the United States)
- Coordinates: 40°28′49″N 75°45′25″W
- Country: United States
- State: Pennsylvania
- County: Berks
- Mayor (Elect): Brandon Pugh

Area
  - Total: 0.36 sq mi (0.92 km^{2})
  - Land: 0.36 sq mi (0.92 km^{2})
  - Water: 0 sq mi (0.00 km^{2})
- Elevation: 476 ft (145 m)

Population (2020)
  - Total: 439
  - Density: 1,233.4/sq mi (476.22/km^{2})
- Time zone: UTC-5 (EST)
  - Summer (DST): UTC-4 (EDT)
- ZIP code: 19536
- Area codes: 610 and 484
- FIPS code: 42-45752
- Website: www.lyonsborough.com

Lyons (also known as Lyon Station) is a borough that is located in Berks County, Pennsylvania, United States. The population was 439 at the time of the 2020 census.

== History ==
Lyons was founded as Lyon Station in 1860 when the railroad was extended to that point.

The community was named for Charles Lyons, a railroad official.

On May 31, 1998, an F3 tornado touched down in Lyons, causing roughly $1,400,000 worth of damage to local homes and properties. The town was closed off for nearly one month to all non-residents, save for construction teams and the Red Cross.

== Geography ==
Lyons is located in eastern Berks County at 40°28′49″N 75°45′25″W (40.480194, -75.756987). It is bordered by Maxatawny Township on its north, east, and south sides, and by Richmond Township to the southwest. The unincorporated community of Bowers borders the east side of Lyons.

Lyons is located 3 miles (5 km) south of Kutztown. Topton is 3 miles (5 km) to the east, and Fleetwood is 4 miles (6 km) to the west.

According to the U.S. Census Bureau, Lyons has a total area of 0.35 square miles (0.9 km^{2}), all land.

== Demographics ==
Historical population
Census	Pop.	Note	%±
1880	458		—
1930	511		—
1940	518		1.4%
1950	545		5.2%
1960	571		4.8%
1970	589		3.2%
1980	579		−1.7%
1990	499		−13.8%
2000	504		1.0%
2010	478		−5.2%
2020	439		−8.2%

As of the census of 2000, there were 504 people, 203 households, and 133 families residing in the borough. The population density was 1,278.8 inhabitants per square mile (493.7/km^{2}). There were 216 housing units at an average density of 548.1 per square mile (211.6/km^{2}). The racial makeup of the borough was 97.62% White, 0.99% African American, 0.20% Asian, 0.20% from other races, and 0.99% from two or more races. Hispanic or Latino of any race were 1.19% of the population.

There were 203 households, out of which 28.6% had children under the age of 18 living with them, 47.3% were married couples living together, 13.3% had a female householder with no husband present, and 34.0% were non-families. 21.7% of all households were made up of individuals, and 4.4% had someone living alone who was 65 years of age or older. The average household size was 2.48 and the average family size was 2.81.

In the borough the population was spread out, with 21.6% under the age of 18, 16.9% from 18 to 24, 32.1% from 25 to 44, 18.7% from 45 to 64, and 10.7% who were 65 years of age or older. The median age was 33 years. For every 100 females there were 97.6 males. For every 100 females age 18 and over, there were 99.5 males.

The median income for a household in the borough was $40,500, and the median income for a family was $42,292. Males had a median income of $30,357 versus $25,875 for females. The per capita income for the borough was $20,459. About 3.2% of families and 8.9% of the population were below the poverty line, including 6.7% of those under age 18 and none of those age 65 or over.

== Government ==
Lyons was served by the Berks-Lehigh Regional Police until it was disbanded on December 31, 2012. The borough is currently served by the Pennsylvania State Police.

In 2025, there will be an election to elect a mayor to replace the late Randy Schlegel, who died in January 2025. The candidates are Alex Darlington and write-in candidate Brandon Pugh.

== Arts and culture ==
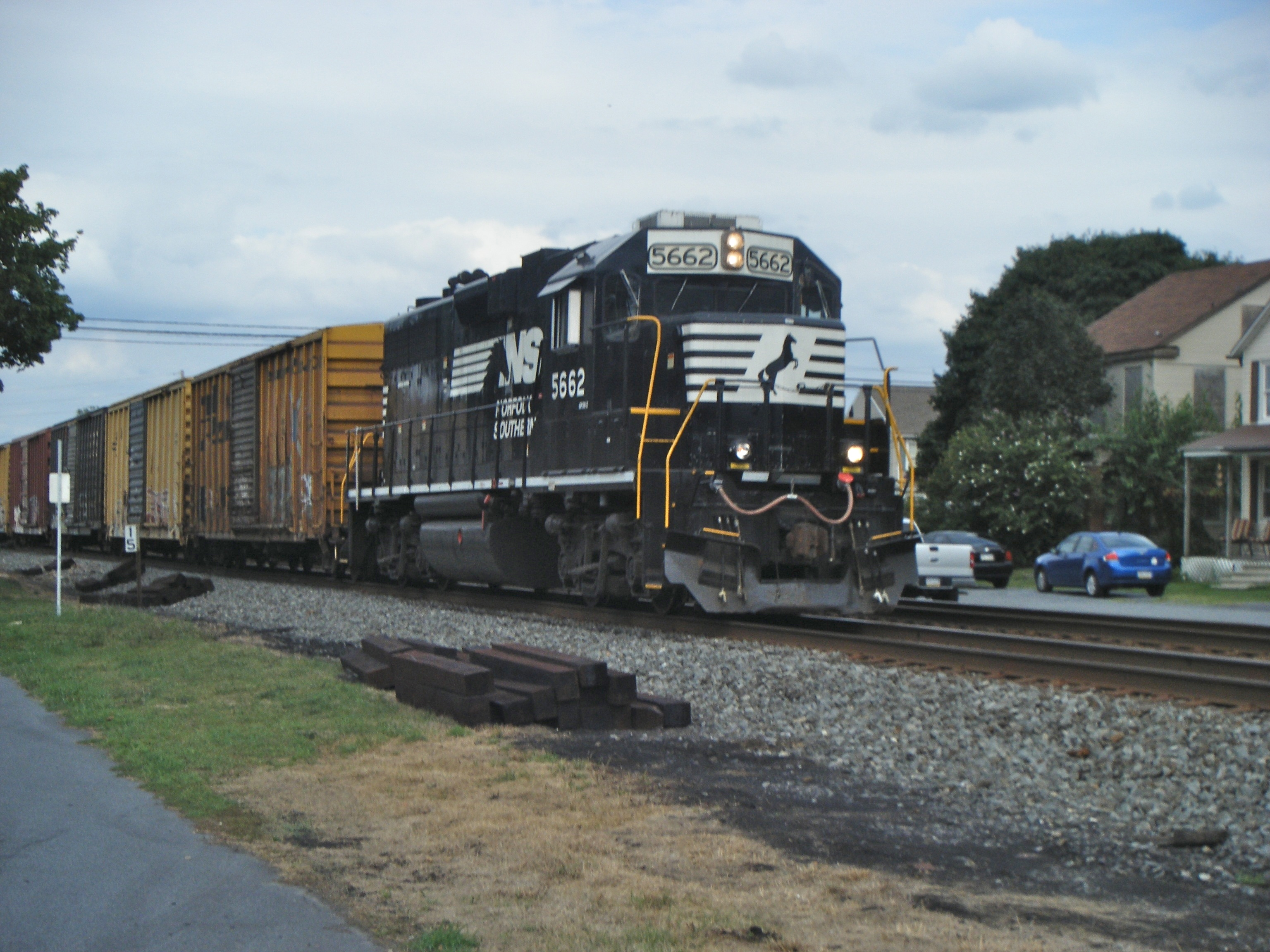
Norfolk Southern Railway freight train westbound on the Reading Line

Lyons hosts an annual Fiddle Festival every September where there is traditional Pennsylvania Dutch food, crafts, as well as dancing and fiddling contests. This is a large event hosting up to 1,000 people annually.

Lyons Ballfield is a softball ballfield associated with the Lyons Fire Company. It hosts many adult male and female fast-pitch softball games and PIAA high school softball games. The Kutztown Cougars and Brandywine Bullets have both used Lyons Ballfield as a home venue for some games. The ballfield is managed by Naaman Schlegel, a native of Lyons.

== Transportation ==
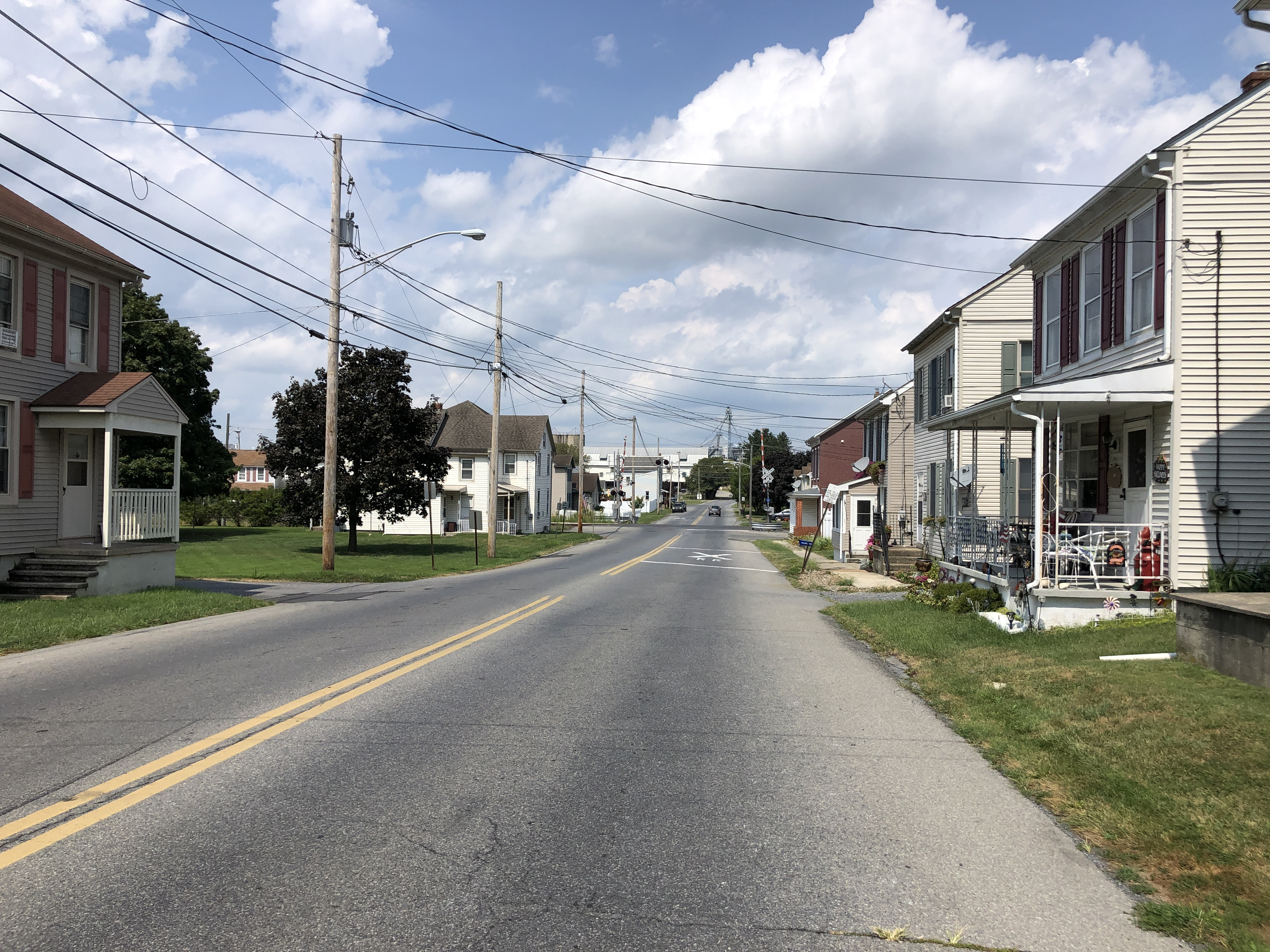
Main Street in Lyons

As of 2019, there were 3.56 miles (5.73 km) of public roads in Lyons, of which 1.29 miles (2.08 km) were maintained by the Pennsylvania Department of Transportation (PennDOT) and 2.27 miles (3.65 km) were maintained by the borough.

No numbered highways pass through Lyons. The main thoroughfares through the borough include Main Street, Kemp Street, State Street and Penn Street.
