= Maxatawny Township, Pennsylvania =

Township in Pennsylvania, US

Maxatawny Township
- Township
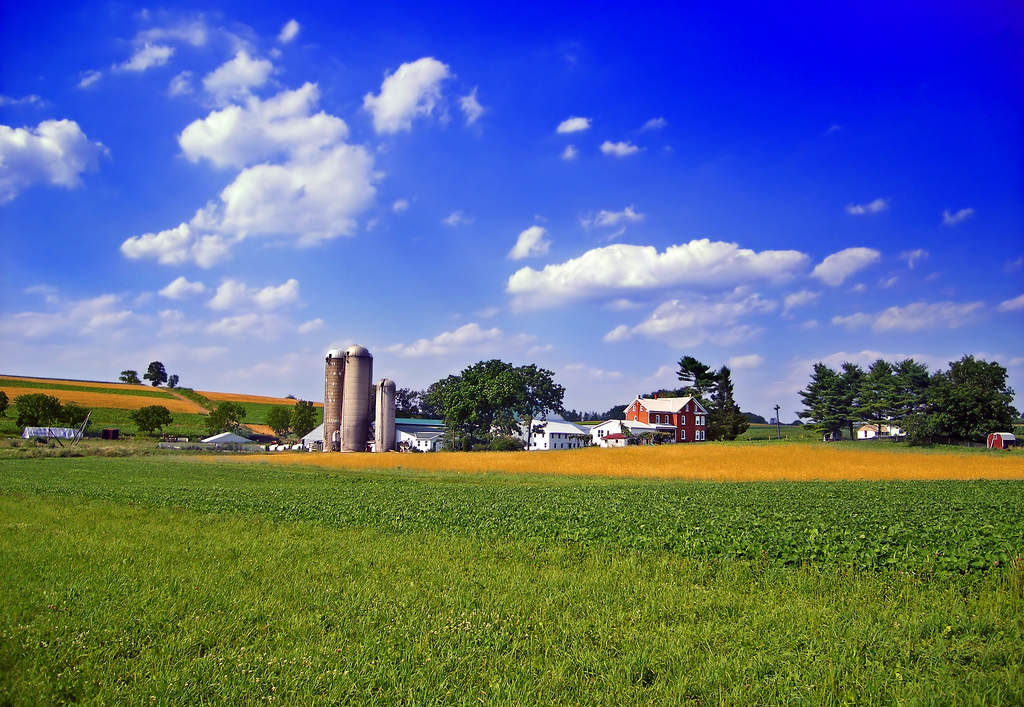
- A farm in Maxatawny Township in July 2007

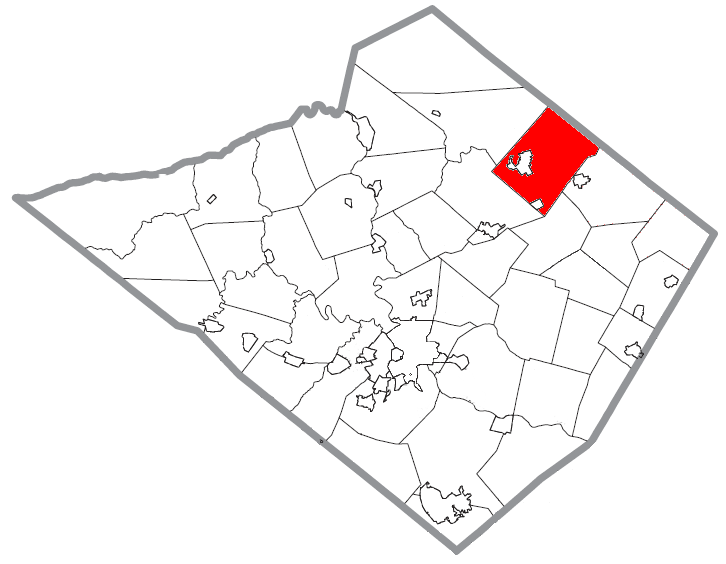
- Location of Maxatawny Township in Berks County, Pennsylvania

- Location of Maxatawny Township in Pennsylvania Maxatawny Township (the United States)
- Coordinates: 40°29′30″N 75°44′29″W
- Country: United States
- State: Pennsylvania
- County: Berks
- Founded: 1732

Area
  - Total: 26.00 sq mi (67.33 km^{2})
  - Land: 25.95 sq mi (67.22 km^{2})
  - Water: 0.042 sq mi (0.11 km^{2})
- Elevation: 423 ft (129 m)

Population (2010)
  - Total: 7,906
  - Estimate (2016): 7,334
  - Density: 282.6/sq mi (109.11/km^{2})
- Time zone: UTC−5 (EST)
  - Summer (DST): UTC−4 (EDT)
- ZIPp Codes: 19511, mainly 19530, 19538, 19539
- Area code: 610
- FIPS code: 42-011-48128
- Website: www.maxatawny.org

Maxatawny Township is a township in Berks County, Pennsylvania, United States. The population was 7,906 at the 2010 census.

== History ==
Maxatawny is a name derived from a Native American language purported to mean "bear's path creek".

The Boyer-Mertz Farm, Hottenstein Mansion, Kemp's Hotel, and Siegfried's Dale Farm are listed on the National Register of Historic Places.

== Geography ==
According to the U.S. Census Bureau, the township has a total area of 26.3 square miles (68.0 km^{2}), of which 26.2 square miles (68.0 km^{2}) is land and 0.04 square mile (0.1 km^{2}) (0.15%) is water. Its villages include Bowers, Hinterleiter, Maxatawny, Mill Creek Corner, and Monterey. The township is in the Delaware River watershed and most of it is drained by the Sacony Creek into the Schuylkill River. An area in the eastern portion is drained by the Little Lehigh Creek into the Lehigh River.

Maxatawny Township has a hot-summer humid continental climate (Dfa) and the hardiness zone is 6b, except in some areas north of 222, where it is 6a. The average monthly temperatures in Monterey range from 28.5 °F in January to 73.0 °F in July.

Adjacent townships

- Longswamp Township (east)
- Rockland Township (south)
- Richmond Township (southwest)
- Greenwich Township (northwest)
- Weisenberg Township, Lehigh County (north)
- Upper Macungie Township, Lehigh County (northeast)

Maxatawny Township surrounds the borough of Kutztown, and touches Lyons to the south and Topton to the east. It contains the census-designated place of Maxatawny.

== Demographics ==
Historical population
Census	Pop.	Note	%±
1980	5,269		—
1990	5,724		8.6%
2000	5,982		4.5%
2010	7,906		32.2%
2016 (est.)	7,334		−7.2%
Source: US Census Bureau

As of the 2010 census, there were 5,982 people, 1,348 households, and 997 families residing in the township. The population density was 228.0 inhabitants per square mile (88.0/km^{2}). There were 1,384 housing units at an average density of 52.8 per square mile (20.4/km^{2}). The racial makeup of the township was 96.05% White, 1.99% African American, 0.08% Native American, 0.60% Asian, 0.13% Pacific Islander, 0.33% from other races, and 0.80% from two or more races. Hispanic or Latino of any race were 1.45% of the population.

There were 1,348 households, out of which 29.5% had children under the age of 18 living with them, 64.6% were married couples living together, 5.6% had a female householder with no husband present, and 26.0% were non-families. 19.1% of all households were made up of individuals, and 8.4% had someone living alone who was 65 years of age or older. The average household size was 2.64 and the average family size was 3.01.

In the township, the population was spread out, with 13.9% under the age of 18, 45.6% from 18 to 24, 15.9% from 25 to 44, 16.3% from 45 to 64, and 8.1% who were 65 years of age or older. The median age was 21 years. For every 100 females, there were 81.3 males. For every 100 females age 18 and over, there were 79.2 males.

The median income for a household in the township was $51,006, and the median income for a family was $57,813. Males had a median income of $38,092 versus $22,147 for females. The per capita income for the township was $15,586. About 3.4% of families and 8.1% of the population were below the poverty line, including 7.9% of those under age 18 and 6.9% of those age 65 or over.

== Politics and government ==
=== Legislators ===
- State Representative Gary Day, Republican, 187th district
- State Senator Judy Schwank, Democrat, 11th district
- U.S. Representative Dan Meuser, Republican, 9th district

=== Police ===
Maxatawny Township was served by the Berks-Lehigh Regional Police. On April 16, 2012, the Berks-Lehigh Regional Police announced it was disbanding at the end of 2012. On December 28, 2012, it was announced Maxatawny Township would form its own police department. The new department would be led by one officer for the time being who would be in charge of ordinance enforcement and traffic studies, with the Pennsylvania State Police handling emergency calls and arrests in the township. The ordinance that was passed put the framework in place for a department to be created in the future.

In May 2013, supervisors mailed a survey to residents to gauge whether they supported funding a township police department, at a total cost near $2 million. Out of 1,622 surveys mailed out, 1,040 were returned, and over 80% of the residents who responded voted no, leaving the township's police coverage to the state police for the foreseeable future.

== Transportation ==
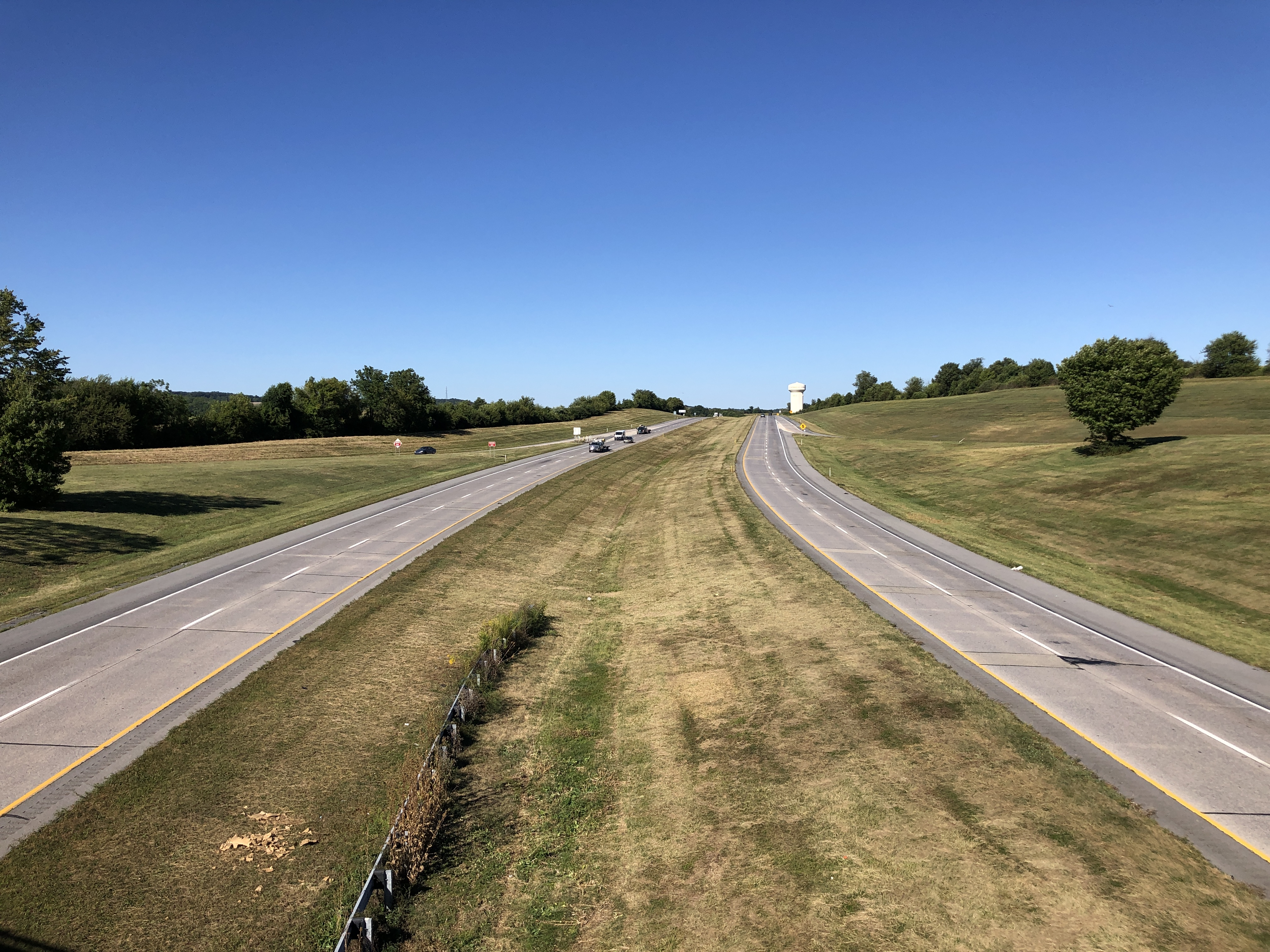
US 222 northbound in Maxatawny Township

As of 2019, there were 78.19 miles (125.83 km) of public roads in Maxatawny Township, of which 23.06 miles (37.11 km) were maintained by the Pennsylvania Department of Transportation (PennDOT) and 55.13 miles (88.72 km) were maintained by the township.

The most prominent highway in Maxatawny Township is U.S. Route 222, which follows a southwest-northeast alignment through the township. Pennsylvania Route 737 extends north from US 222 to Interstate 78 in Krumsville and to Kempton. I-78/US 22 run through the northernmost tip of Maxatawny Township for approximately 0.3 mile between Greenwich Township and the Lehigh County line. Other primary local north-to-south roads are Topton Road/Long Lane, Kohler Road, and Noble Street. Other east–west roads include College Boulevard, Hinterleiter Road/Linden Street, and Siegfriedale Road.

== Education ==
Maxatawny is served by the Kutztown Area School District. Kutztown University of Pennsylvania lies mostly in the township and straddles the boundary with Kutztown.

== Culture ==
There is a notable presence of Pennsylvania Dutch culture in the township, despite growing diversity in from those relocated from regional metropolitan areas. A significant numbers of Mennonites continue to farm some of the township's land. Renninger's Antique and Farmers' Market and the Pennsylvania German Cultural Heritage Center at Kutztown University of Pennsylvania are located in Maxatawny Township. Bowers Chili Pepper Festival is held annually each September in DeLong Park.
