= Berks-Lehigh Regional Police =

Coordinates: 40.53156°N 75.73528°W

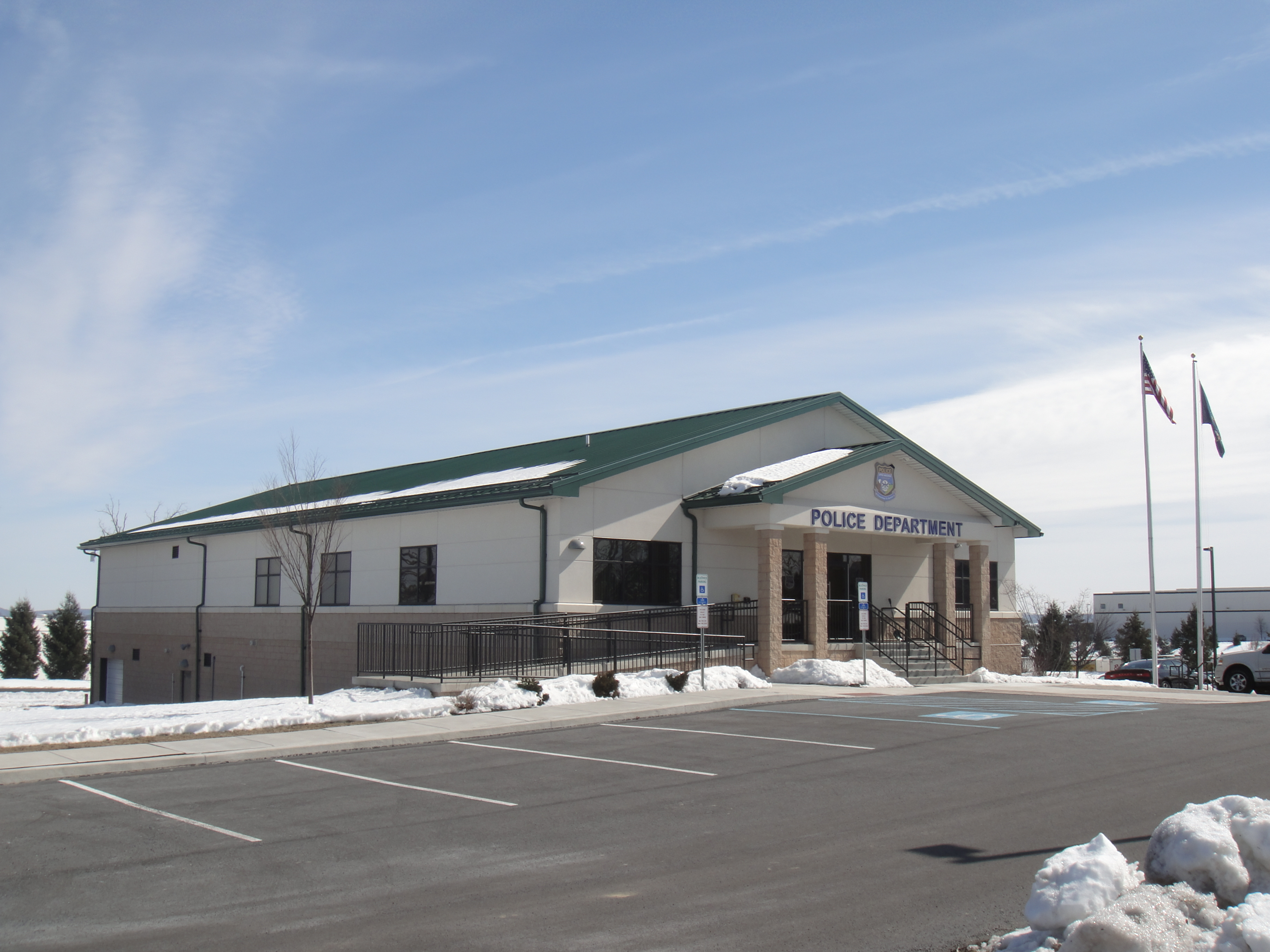
The new Upper Macungie Township Police department located in Breinigsville

The Berks-Lehigh Regional Police was a multi-jurisdictional police department in eastern Pennsylvania. The agency provided law enforcement services to four incorporated municipalities in Berks and Lehigh counties. In Berks County, the department served Topton, Lyons, and Maxatawny Township. In Lehigh County, Upper Macungie Township was served by the agency.

== History ==
Through the formation of a police district under the control of a Police Commission, some municipalities in Pennsylvania have found that improved and more professional police services could be obtained through inter-governmental cooperation. Having one police department covering four neighboring communities, rather than four separate police departments, allows each municipality to enjoy the benefits of a larger department, such as specialized units and a professional staff.

Prior to January 1, 2001, the department was known as the Northeastern Berks Regional Police, as it only covered the three Berks County municipalities. The agency by this name existed between 1991 and 2001. When neighboring Upper Macungie Township in Lehigh County joined the agency in 2001, the name was changed to Berks-Lehigh Regional Police.

On April 16, 2012, the Berks-Lehigh Regional Police announced it was disbanding at the end of 2012, with Upper Macungie Township forming its own police force.

On December 28, 2012, it was announced Maxatawny Township would form its own police department. The new department would be led by one officer for the time being who would be in charge of ordinance enforcement and traffic studies, with the Pennsylvania State Police handling emergency calls and arrests in the township. A full-scale police department may be created in the future. In a primary ballot in May, residents voted against establishing a police department with a two-mil tax increase. Maxatawny Township is currently served by the Pennsylvania State Police, Reading Barracks. The Pennsylvania State Police also serves Topton Borough and Lyons Borough.
