= Breinigsville, Pennsylvania =

Unincorporated community in Pennsylvania, US

- Census-designated place
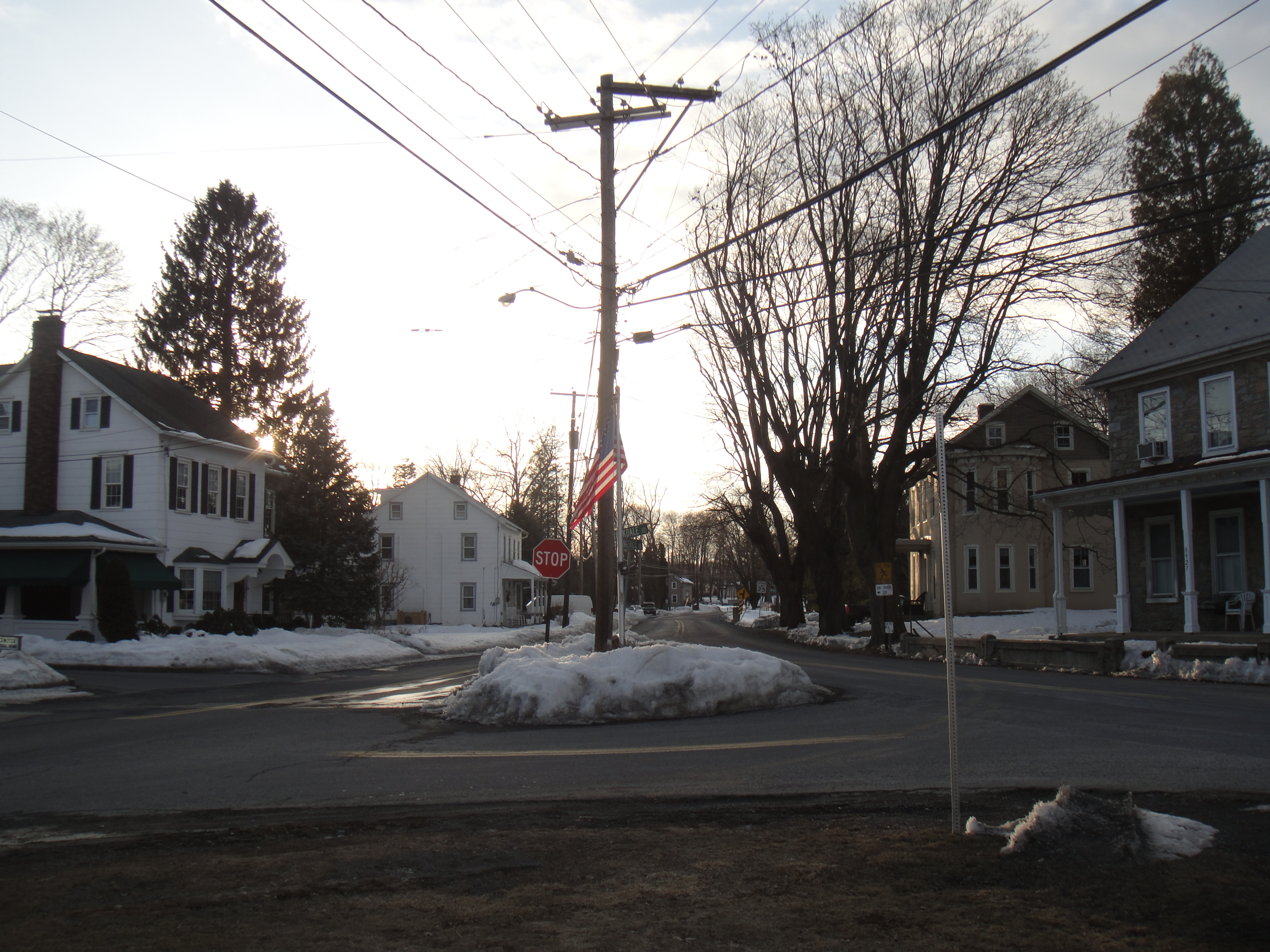
- Breinigsville in March 2014

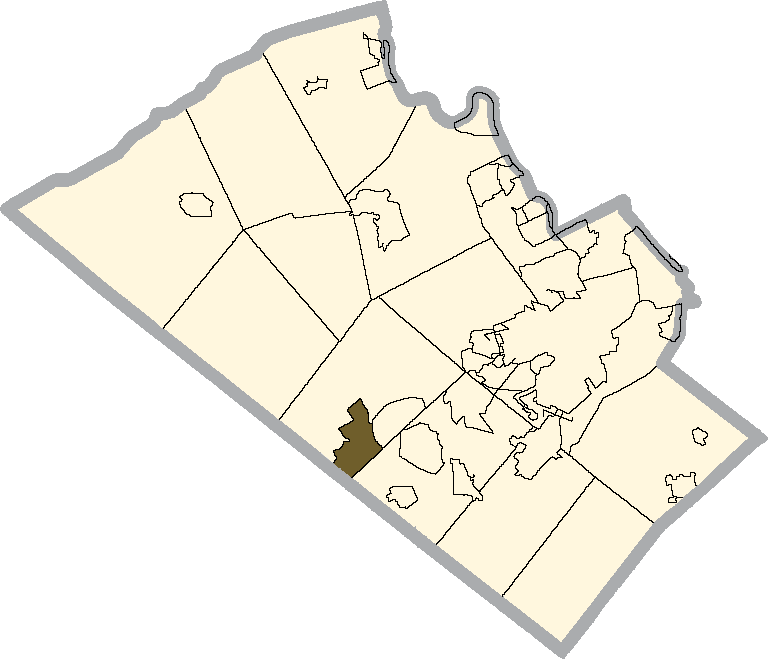
- Location of Breinigsville in Lehigh County, Pennsylvania

- Location of Breinigsville in Pennsylvania Location in the United States
- Coordinates: 40°32′12″N 75°37′53″W
- Country: United States
- State: Pennsylvania
- County: Lehigh
- Township: Upper Macungie Township

Area
  - Census-designated place: 3.38 sq mi (8.75 km^{2})
  - Land: 3.37 sq mi (8.73 km^{2})
  - Water: 0.0039 sq mi (0.01 km^{2})
- Elevation: 406 ft (124 m)

Population (2020)
  - Census-designated place: 7,495
  - Density: 2,222.6/sq mi (858.14/km^{2})
  - Metro: 865,310 (US: 68th)
- Time zone: UTC-5 (Eastern (EST))
  - Summer (DST): UTC-4 (EDT)
- ZIP Code: 18031
- Area codes: 610 and 484
- FIPS code: 42-08392
- GNIS feature ID: 1170194
- Primary airport: Lehigh Valley International Airport
- Major hospital: Lehigh Valley Hospital–Cedar Crest
- School district: Parkland

Breinigsville is an unincorporated community and census-designated place (CDP) in Lehigh County, Pennsylvania. As of the 2020 census, it had a population of 7,495. The town is part of Upper Macungie Township and is located approximately 11 miles (18 km) southwest of downtown Allentown and 8 miles (13 km) east of Kutztown.

It is part of the Lehigh Valley metropolitan area, which had a population of 861,899 and was the 68th-most populous metropolitan area in the U.S. as of the 2020 census.

== History ==
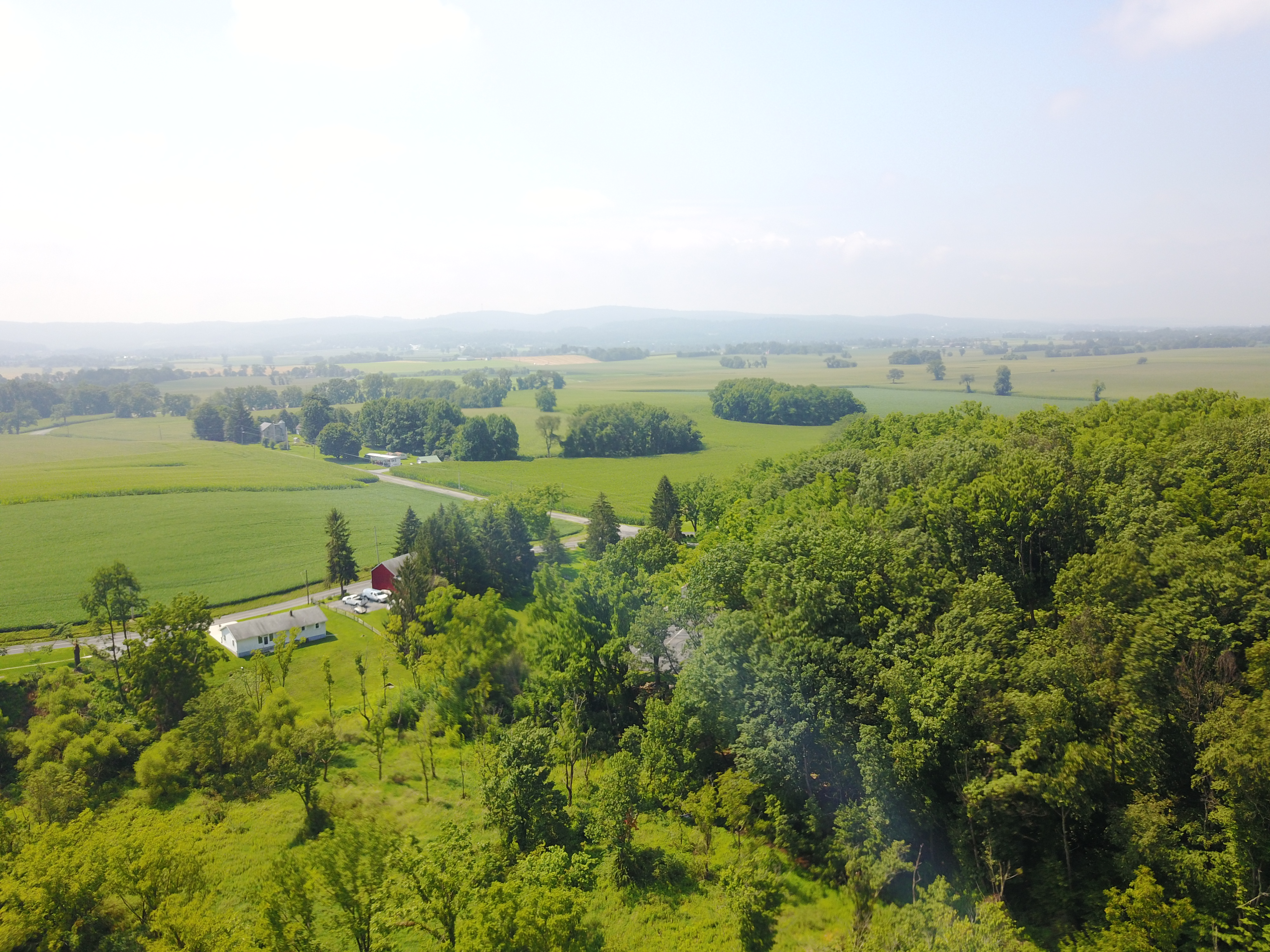
Breinigsville in August 2017

=== 18th century ===
Breinigsville was named for George Ludwig Breinig (January 31, 1733 – May 12, 1812), a German immigrant who came to the United States on board the ship Lydia, arriving in Philadelphia on October 13, 1749. He originally settled in Weisenberg Township (tax records show he was assessed 9 pounds in 1762). On May 10, 1771, Breinig purchased around 100 acres (40 ha) of land and a stone dwelling for 700 pounds from Peter and Catherine Trexler of Trexlertown. He resided on that land until his death.

Breinig was one of the judges of the election at Allentown on July 8, 1776, when delegates to the first constitutional convention of the state were elected. During the Revolutionary War, Breinig became the colonel of the Second Battalion of Northampton County militia. In 1786, he was commissioned a justice of the district of Macungie and Weisenberg townships. Breinig is buried at Zion Lehigh Lutheran Church in Alburtis, PA.

Among his seven children was Peter Breinig, his youngest son who founded Breinigsville and owned a 123-acre (50 ha) farm. He built a tavern in the village and operated it for some years. As in most early towns, the tavern served as the center of the community.

=== 19th century ===
In the early 1800s, the village was a center for iron ore mining, which employed many men. Around 1855 the Allentown Railroad was graded through Breinigsville, but the tracks were never laid. In the 1860s, the Catasauqua and Fogelsville Railroad used the grade to build from Trexlertown, on its main line, into Breinigsville, as part of a branch to serve local limonite (iron ore) mines. The largest deposit of pyrite ore in the region was located 2 miles (3 km) northwest of Breinigsville. Later, the village was served by the Allentown-Reading Traction Company. These mines had shut down by the end of World War I, and the rails through Breinigsville were consequently abandoned. They were finally removed in the 1940s.

On the western edge of Breinigsville, a United Brethren Church was built in 1880 whose membership at one time peaked at around 40. Regular services discontinued in 1912.

The village had a lumber, grain, and coal depot, a carriage works, and a general store, which are no longer in existence. In the mid-1800s, a two-room school house was built in the town, with the upper grades taught by Miss Edith Walbert and the lower grades taught by Mr. John Shoemaker. While the school has long ceased operations, the building still stands. Around 1860, an independent school district was formed in the township by an act of the legislature. The single school replaced the dozens of smaller schools, including the one in Breinigsville. The school district served until the early 1900s, when the Parkland School District was formed.

=== 20th century ===
In 1987, AT&T acquired around 137 acres (55 ha) in Breinigsville which became known as TEK Park Campus. The facility became Bell Labs' world headquarters for optoelectronics research. In the late 1990s, the center was spun off as Lucent Technologies. In 2002, it was spun off again as Agere Systems. In 2003, the park was sold to TriQuint Semiconductor.

=== 21st century ===
In 2012, TEK Park was sold to MRA Group for $50 million.

== Demographics ==
Historical population
| Census | Pop. | Note | %± |
|---|---|---|---|
| 2000 | 1,660 | | — |
| 2010 | 4,138 | | 149.3% |
| 2020 | 7,495 | | 81.1% |
U.S. Decennial Census

As of the 2010 census, Breinigsville consists of 51.11% females and 48.89% male. The population is made of 79.92% White Non-Hispanic, 5.24% Black or African American, 0.48% Native American or Alaskan Native, 11.07% Asian, 0.0% Native Hawaiian, 1.55% were two or more races, and 1.74% were some other race. Of the population 7.08% were of Hispanic or Latino ancestry.

The town has a population of 4,138 with a median age of 34.6. The largest age groups are 19.21% (5–17), 17.97% (25–34), 16.24% (35–44), and 12.87% (45–54). Breinigsville has 1,550 households made of 1,112 families and 438 non-family households. The average is 2.67 individuals per household and 3.16 individuals per family. Additionally, with 1,677 total housing units, 1,550 are occupied and 127 are vacant. 91.2% of households are owner-occupied and 2.34% rent.

== Geography ==
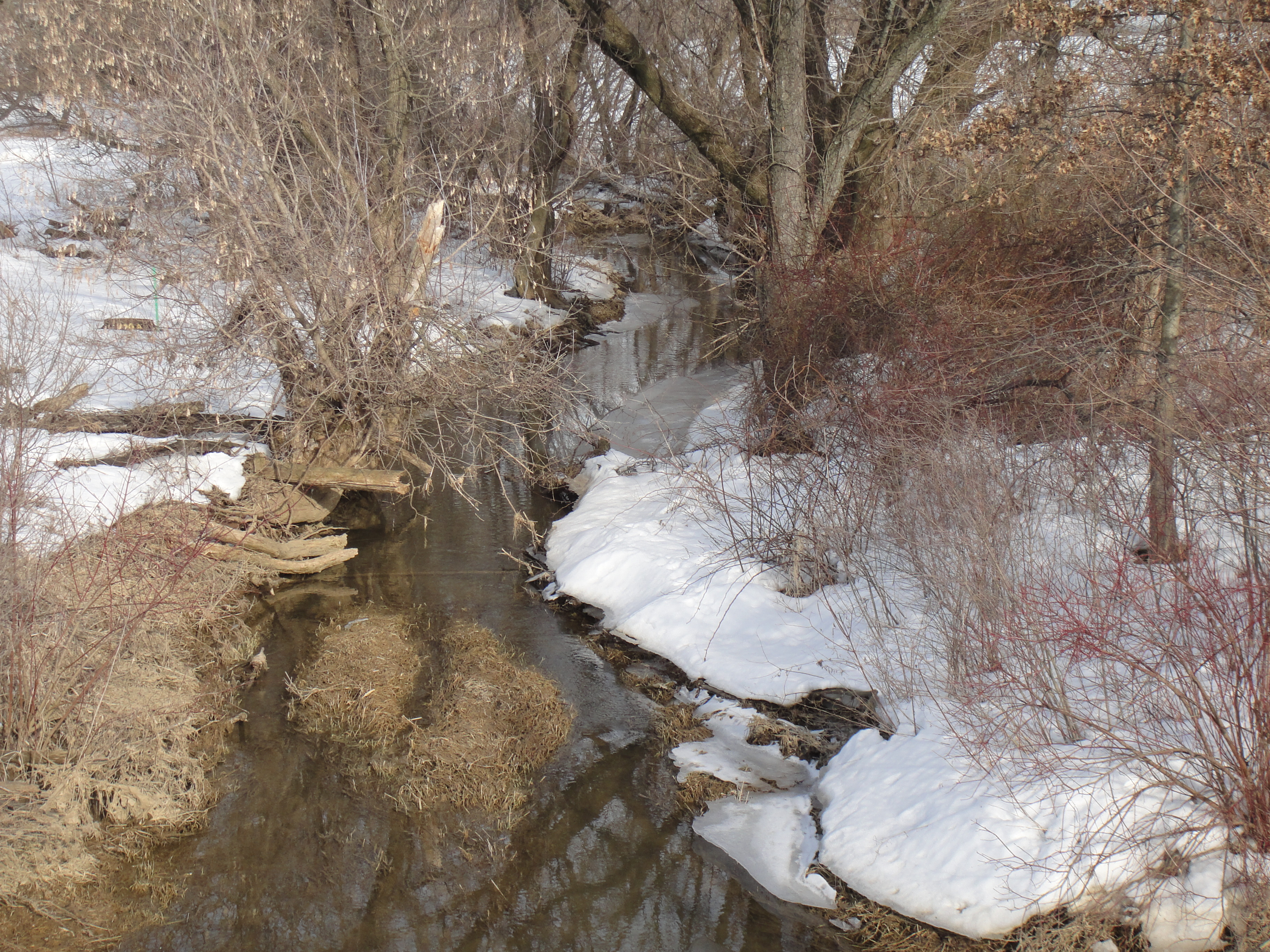
Schaefer Run in March 2014

Breinigsville is located southwest of the center of Lehigh County at 40°32'12" North, 75°37'53" West (40.5367627, -75.6312997). It is in the southern corner of Upper Macungie Township. The elevation is 406 feet (124 m) at the center of town. Breinigsville is located along U.S. Route 222, between its intersection with the southern terminus of Pennsylvania Route 863 and Route 222's Trexlertown Bypass (Fred Jaindl Memorial Highway). Breinigsville is bordered to the northeast by Trexlertown, and Maxatawny 3 miles (5 km) to the west along U.S. 222.

According to the U.S. Census Bureau, Breinigsville has a total area of 3.3 square miles (8.5 km^{2}) of which 0.004 square miles (0.01 km^{2}), or 0.14%, are water. Schaefer Run flows east through the village toward Little Lehigh Creek, a tributary of the Lehigh River and part of the Delaware River watershed.

== Climate ==
Breinigsville lies within the hot-summer humid continental climate zone (Köppen: Dfa), and experiences four distinct seasons. Summers are hot and humid, with a July daily average of 83 °F (28.3 °C). In a normal summer, temperatures exceed 85 °F (29 °C) on 15 days. Winters are cold and snowy with few sunny days, and with a January daytime average high of 34 °F (1.1 °C). Spring and autumn are mild seasons with low humidity. The hardiness zone is 6b.

Climate data for Allentown, Pennsylvania at Lehigh Valley International Airport, 1991–2020 normals, (Note: Mean monthly maxima and minima (i.e. the highest and lowest temperature readings during an entire month or year) calculated based on data at said location from 1981 to 2010.) extremes 1922–present (Note: Official records for Allentown were kept at Allentown Gas Company from March 1922 to December 1943, and at Lehigh Valley Int'l since January 1944. For more information, see ThreadEx.)
| Month | Jan | Feb | Mar | Apr | May | Jun | Jul | Aug | Sep | Oct | Nov | Dec | Year |
|---|---|---|---|---|---|---|---|---|---|---|---|---|---|
| Record high °F (°C) | 72 (22) | 81 (27) | 87 (31) | 93 (34) | 97 (36) | 100 (38) | 105 (41) | 100 (38) | 99 (37) | 93 (34) | 81 (27) | 72 (22) | 105 (41) |
| Mean maximum °F (°C) | 60.2 (15.7) | 60.6 (15.9) | 70.6 (21.4) | 83.2 (28.4) | 89.3 (31.8) | 92.6 (33.7) | 94.8 (34.9) | 92.8 (33.8) | 89.2 (31.8) | 80.4 (26.9) | 70.9 (21.6) | 61.7 (16.5) | 95.9 (35.5) |
| Mean daily maximum °F (°C) | 38.4 (3.6) | 41.6 (5.3) | 50.8 (10.4) | 63.4 (17.4) | 73.5 (23.1) | 81.9 (27.7) | 86.4 (30.2) | 84.3 (29.1) | 77.4 (25.2) | 65.5 (18.6) | 53.8 (12.1) | 43.1 (6.2) | 63.3 (17.4) |
| Daily mean °F (°C) | 30.1 (−1.1) | 32.4 (0.2) | 40.7 (4.8) | 51.8 (11.0) | 62.0 (16.7) | 70.9 (21.6) | 75.6 (24.2) | 73.6 (23.1) | 66.3 (19.1) | 54.6 (12.6) | 43.9 (6.6) | 35.0 (1.7) | 53.1 (11.7) |
| Mean daily minimum °F (°C) | 21.8 (−5.7) | 23.2 (−4.9) | 30.5 (−0.8) | 40.3 (4.6) | 50.6 (10.3) | 59.9 (15.5) | 64.7 (18.2) | 62.8 (17.1) | 55.2 (12.9) | 43.8 (6.6) | 34.1 (1.2) | 26.8 (−2.9) | 42.8 (6.0) |
| Mean minimum °F (°C) | 4.2 (−15.4) | 5.9 (−14.5) | 14.1 (−9.9) | 25.9 (−3.4) | 35.3 (1.8) | 46.5 (8.1) | 53.7 (12.1) | 51.1 (10.6) | 39.9 (4.4) | 28.7 (−1.8) | 19.1 (−7.2) | 11.7 (−11.3) | 1.8 (−16.8) |
| Record low °F (°C) | −15 (−26) | −12 (−24) | −5 (−21) | 12 (−11) | 28 (−2) | 39 (4) | 46 (8) | 41 (5) | 30 (−1) | 21 (−6) | 3 (−16) | −8 (−22) | −15 (−26) |
| Average precipitation inches (mm) | 3.30 (84) | 2.77 (70) | 3.63 (92) | 3.67 (93) | 3.65 (93) | 4.40 (112) | 5.30 (135) | 4.56 (116) | 4.84 (123) | 4.14 (105) | 3.24 (82) | 3.86 (98) | 47.36 (1,203) |
| Average snowfall inches (cm) | 9.8 (25) | 10.8 (27) | 6.3 (16) | 0.5 (1.3) | 0.0 (0.0) | 0.0 (0.0) | 0.0 (0.0) | 0.0 (0.0) | 0.0 (0.0) | 0.2 (0.51) | 0.9 (2.3) | 4.6 (12) | 33.1 (84) |
| Average extreme snow depth inches (cm) | 6.4 (16) | 7.9 (20) | 4.9 (12) | 0.3 (0.76) | 0.0 (0.0) | 0.0 (0.0) | 0.0 (0.0) | 0.0 (0.0) | 0.0 (0.0) | 0.2 (0.51) | 0.6 (1.5) | 2.9 (7.4) | 12.4 (31) |
| Average precipitation days (≥ 0.01 in) | 11.4 | 10.1 | 10.9 | 11.8 | 12.4 | 11.4 | 11.0 | 10.2 | 9.6 | 9.9 | 8.9 | 11.5 | 129.1 |
| Average snowy days (≥ 0.1 in) | 5.1 | 4.3 | 2.6 | 0.3 | 0.0 | 0.0 | 0.0 | 0.0 | 0.0 | 0.0 | 0.5 | 2.9 | 15.7 |
| Average relative humidity (%) | 70 | 66 | 62 | 61 | 66 | 68 | 70 | 72 | 74 | 72 | 70 | 71 | 69 |
| Percentage possible sunshine | 43 | 48 | 53 | 47 | 54 | 63 | 57 | 56 | 54 | 53 | 45 | 42 | 51 |
Source: NOAA (relative humidity 1981–2010)

== Education ==
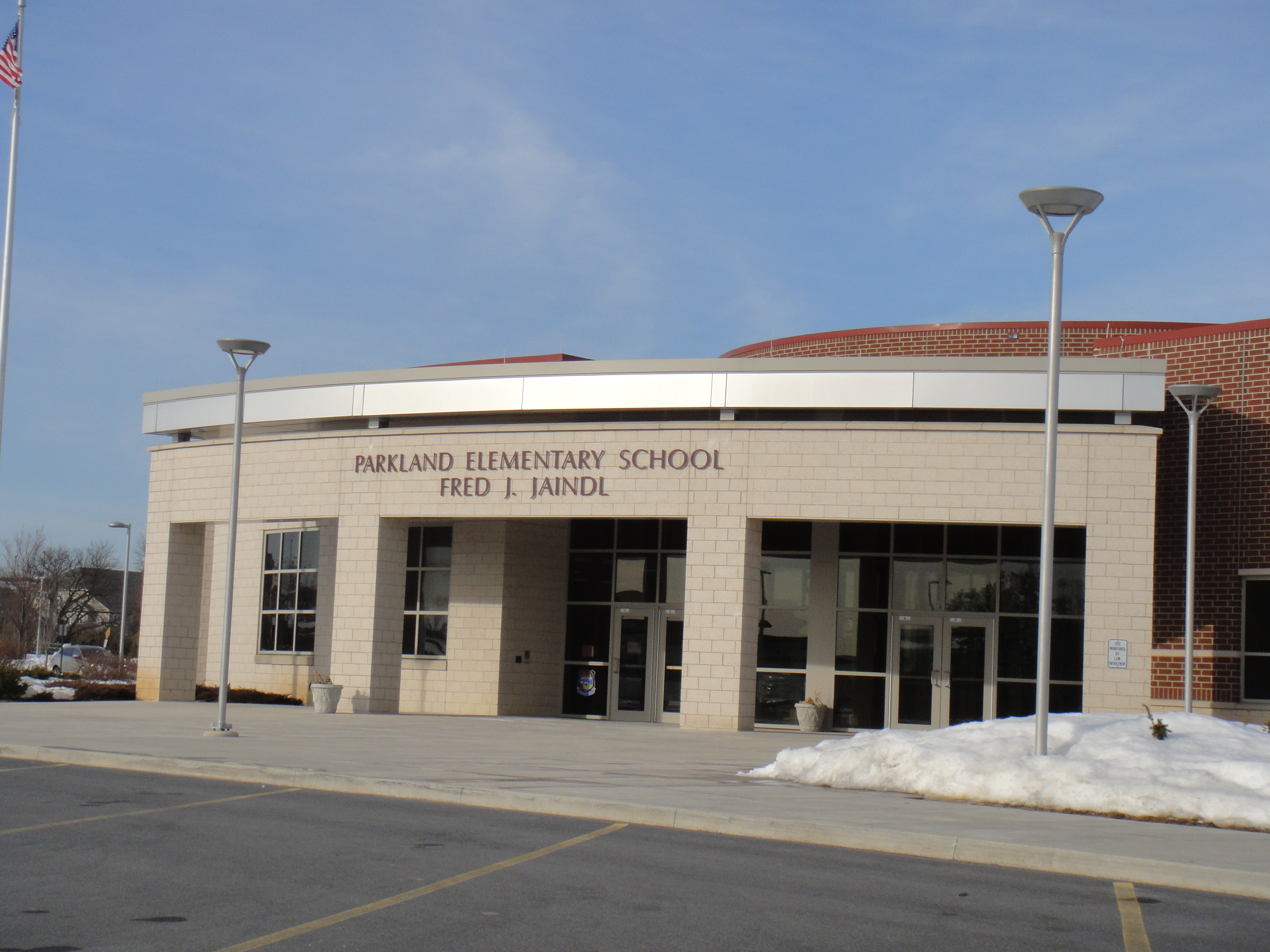
Fred J. Jaindl Elementary School, part of the Parkland School District, in Breinigsville, March 2014

Breinigsville is served educationally by Parkland School District. The district has one high school, Parkland High School (for grades nine through 12), two middle schools Springhouse and Orefield (for grades six through eight), and eight elementary schools (for kindergarten through fifth grade), Cetronia Elementary School, Fogelsville Elementary School, Ironton Elementary School, Fred J. Jaindl Elementary School, Kernsville Elementary School, Kratzer Elementary School, Parkway Manor Elementary School, and Schnecksville Elementary School. Elementary students from the Breinigsville area attend Fogelsville or Jaindl while its middle-school students attend Springhouse.

The Fred J. Jaindl Elementary School, which opened fall of 2010, is located in Breinigsville.

== Economy ==
Throughout the 19th century, the economy of Breinigsville was primarily agriculture and mining. A number of large mines existed; the mines and later the train tracks were abandoned. In the early 1900s the town was transformed into a mainly agriculture-based economy.

Toward the late 1970s and 80s, due to relatively cheaper land prices and close proximity to New York, a number of major distributors and warehouses have relocated to the area. Large facilities and distribution centers in Breinigsville include Amazon, ShopRite, Olympus, Home Depot, Uline, Niagara Bottling and Nestlé/Deer Park Water Bottling Plant. In 2009, Nestlé Waters renovated its facility to become LEED Gold certified. Some warehouses, particularly Amazon's, have been criticized in the local press for dangerous working conditions. In March 2014, the Supreme Court agreed to hear the case that involves Amazon's warehouse in Breinigsville.

A number of large book publishing companies also operate from Breinigsville. In addition to Amazon, RR Donnelley is also located in the town. In 2007, Lightning Source opened a 130,000 square feet printing and distributing facility in Breinigsville. The corporate headquarters of Buckeye Partners is in Breinigsville.

Agriculturally, the town is still the home to a number of nurseries and greenhouses operated by small business. Grim's Greenhouse is located in Breinigsville. The town has a number of large vineyards. Clover Hill Vineyards & Winery as well as Vynecrest Vineyard & Winery are located in Breinigsville; the town is also the home to a major Samuel Adams brewery.

== Police and fire ==
Before 2013 Breinigsville was served by the Berks-Lehigh Regional Police, which was a multi-jurisdictional police department. The department is now defunct. Effective December 31, 2012, Upper Macungie Township Police Department serves the town. The department is located at 37 Grim Road in Breinigsville.

Breinigsville is primarily served by Good Will Fire Co. #1 of Trexlertown, with automatic aid provided by Fogelsville Volunteer Fire Co. and Upper Macungie Township Emergency Services Lehigh County Station 56.

== Recreation ==
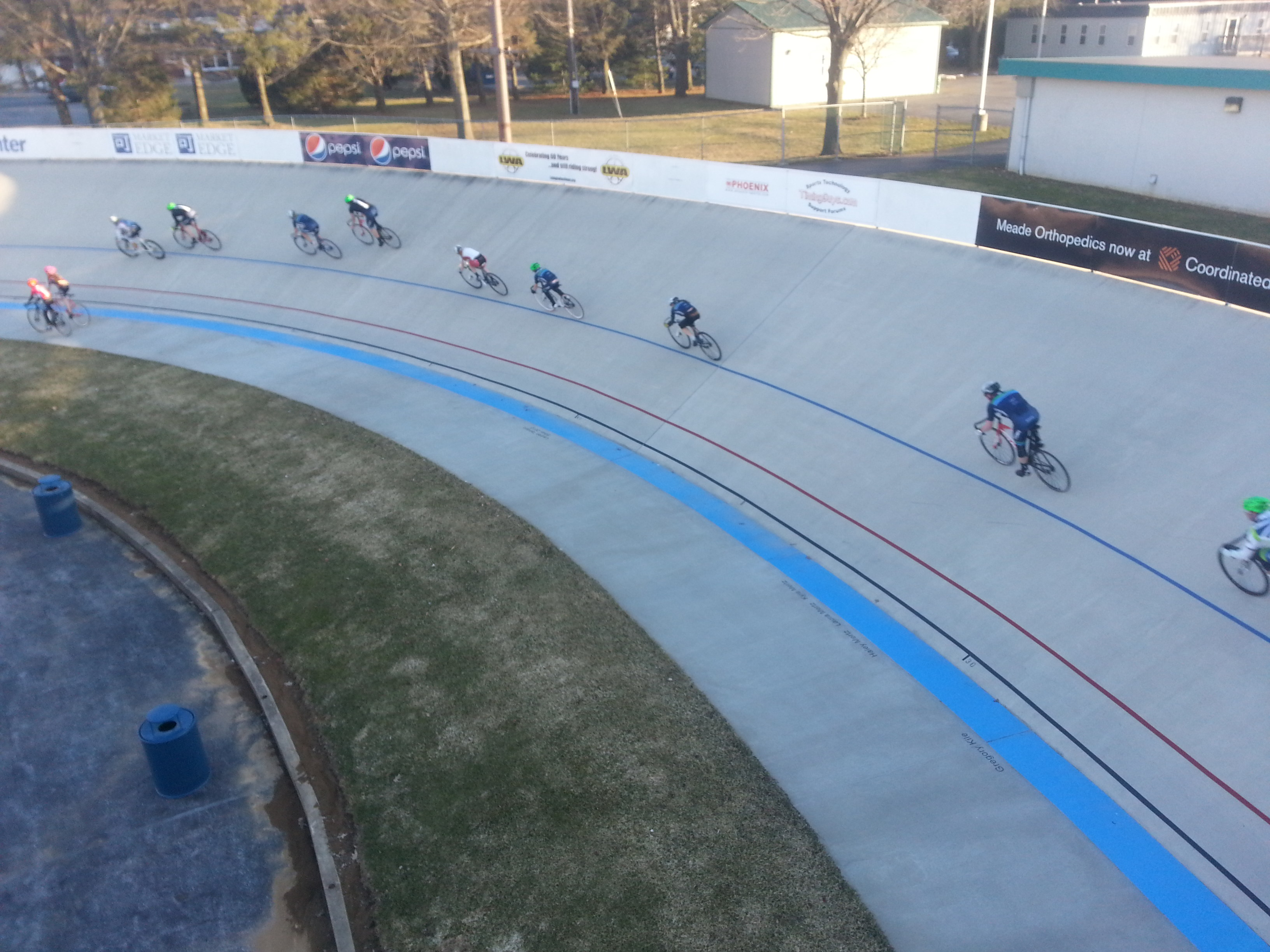
Valley Preferred Cycling Center, a cycling velodrome in Breinigsville

Terry Hill Waterpark and Campgrounds, a 43-acre (0.17 km^{2}; 0.067 sq mi) water park, was located in Breinigsville. As of January 2010, the waterpark was shut down and available for purchase, while the adjacent trailer park remained in operation. In the fall of 2017, the water park was purchased by the owners of Clover Hill Vineyards.

Breinigsville has a number of neighborhood parks and playgrounds. Breinigsville Park is in the center of Breinigsville. The park, 24.3 acres (9.8 ha), has 2/3 mile of paved walking/cycling paths. Additionally, it offers baseball and softball fields, a basketball court, and a sand volleyball court. The Valley Preferred Cycling Center is located between Breinigsville and Trexlertown, with a Breinigsville mailing address but within the Trexlertown census-designated place. It is one of the most well-known cycling stadiums in the country and attracts cyclists from all over the world.

== In popular culture ==
In 2004, then-president George W. Bush made an unannounced stop at the Home Town Diner in Breinigsville.

In 2012, an entire episode of 30 Minute Meals featuring Rachael Ray and Regis Philbin was filmed from the home of a couple from Breinigsville.
