= Boyer–Mertz Farm =

Historic district in Pennsylvania, United States

- U.S. National Register of Historic Places
- U.S. Historic district
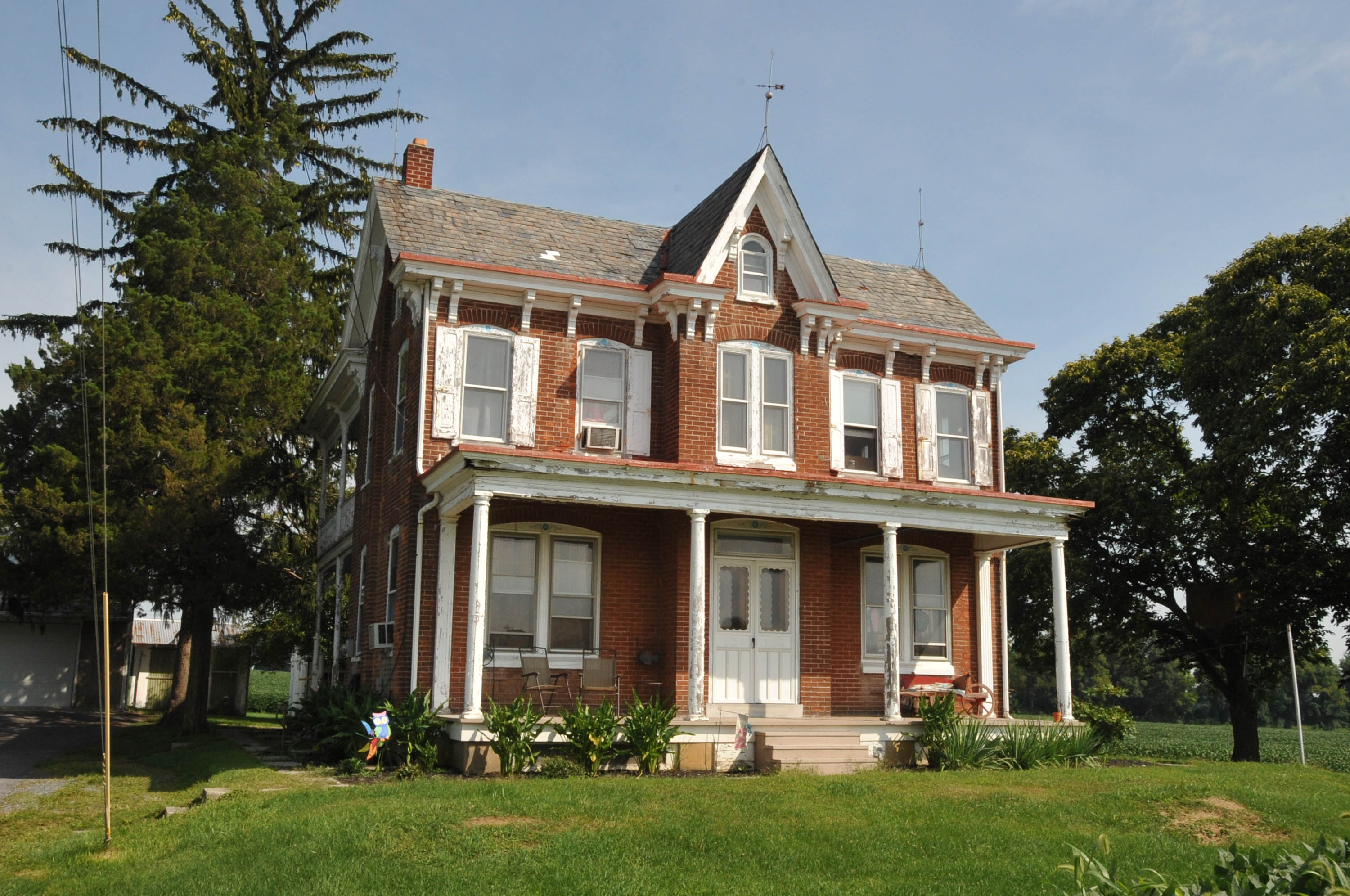
- Boyer–Mertz Farm, August 2014

- Location within Pennsylvania Location within the United States
- Location: Jct. of Noble St. and Bastian Rd., Maxatawny Township, Pennsylvania
- Coordinates: 40°29′50″N 75°45′59″W
- Area: 102 acres (41 ha)
- Built: 1871, 1905
- Architectural style: Pennsylvania bank barn
- MPS: Farms in Berks County MPS
- NRHP reference No.: 92000937
- Added to NRHP: September 9, 1992

The Boyer–Mertz Farm, also known as Angstadt Farm, is a historic farm complex and national historic district located in Maxatawny Township, Berks County, Pennsylvania.

It was listed on the National Register of Historic Places in 1992.

== History ==
The historic Boyer–Mertz Farm complex had its genesis in a land patent granted to John Coates on November 27, 1800, by John Penn and Richard Penn, descendants of Pennsylvania's founder, William Penn. That patent, which was subsequently transferred to Phillip Mertz on June 30, 1802, became the basis for possession of the farm's acreage by the Mertz family until 1845 when it sold to Solomon and Benneville Boyer with Benneville Boyer ultimately retaining sole ownership of the property with his wife, Mary. In 1871, the Boyers improved the property by erecting a barn there, per that barn's datestone. According to historians who researched the property's history in preparation for its listing on the National Register of Historic Places, the Boyers were also likely responsible for erecting the brick tenant house and stone summer kitchen.

On April 26, 1901, Benneville Boyer resold the property, returning it to the Mertz family, members of whom were subsequently responsible for building the residence on the property which dates to 1905. The Mertzes retained control of the property until 1941 when it was resold to Morris Shafer, who then resold it to Kuney and Arlene Angstadt in 1945. Nearly thirty years later, on August 17, 1972, they transferred the property to Ernest Angstadt.

The Boyer–Mertz Farm was listed on the National Register of Historic Places in 1992.

In February 2017, a major storm moving through Maxatawny Township damaged part of the farm complex. The storm's strong winds lifted the roof off of one of the barns.

== Architectural features ==
The Boyer–Mertz Farm has nine contributing buildings and eleven contributing structures, including a 2 1/2-story, brick tenant house (1871); brick-and-frame Pennsylvania bank barn (1871); and a 2 1/2-story, brick farmhouse (1905). The remaining buildings include a stone summer kitchen (c. 1850), three wagon / buggy sheds, a carriage shop, and privy. The contributing structures include a pumphouse, four chicken houses, five stone cisterns, and a corn crib.
