= Monterey, Berks County, Pennsylvania =

Monterey, Pennsylvania
- Unincorporated community
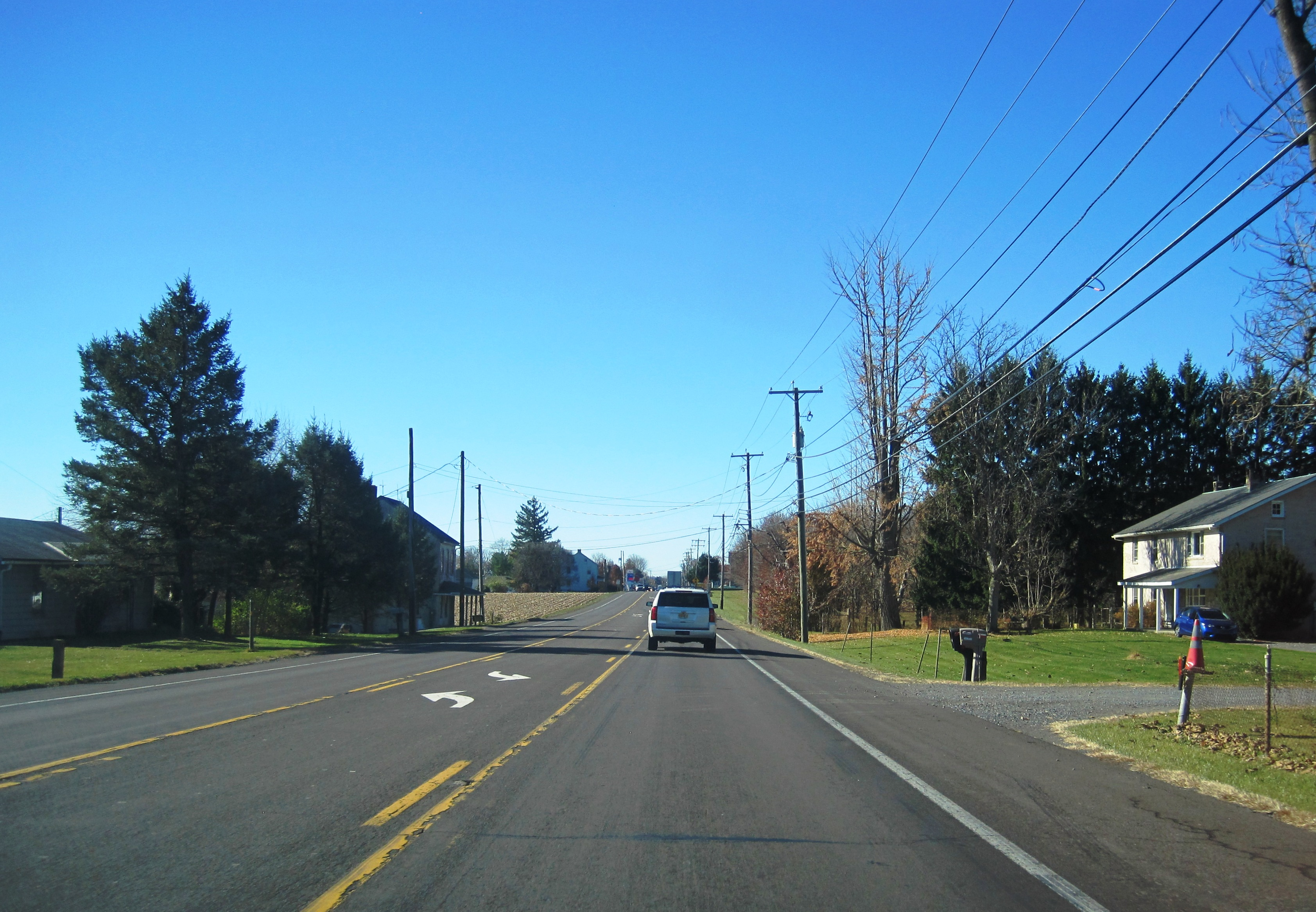
- US 222 through Monterey

- Location within Pennsylvania Location within the United States
- Coordinates: 40°32′18″N 75°43′30″W
- Country: United States
- State: Pennsylvania
- County: Berks
- Township: Maxatawny
- Elevation: 545 ft (166 m)
- Time zone: UTC-5 (Eastern (EST))
  - Summer (DST): UTC-4 (EDT)
- Area codes: 610 and 484
- GNIS feature ID: 1204203

Monterey is an unincorporated community in Maxatawny Township in Berks County, Pennsylvania, United States. Monterey is located along U.S. Route 222, east of the intersection with Long Lane.
