= Kemp's Hotel =

- U.S. National Register of Historic Places
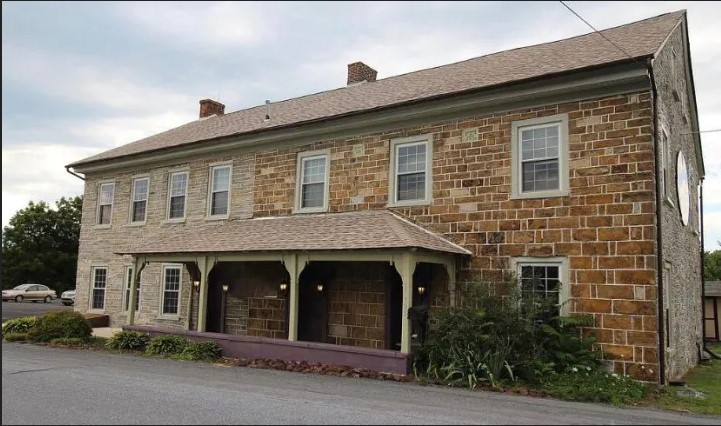
- Vintage House Private Events (Kemp's Hotel), c. 2022

- Location within Pennsylvania Location within the United States
- Location: 15305 Kutztown Road, Maxatawny Township, Pennsylvania
- Coordinates: 40°31′48″N 75°45′48″W
- Area: 1 acre (0.40 ha)
- Built: c. 1740, 1765
- NRHP reference No.: 78002344
- Added to NRHP: December 19, 1978

The Kemp's Hotel is an historic inn and tavern building in Maxatawny Township, Berks County, Pennsylvania, United States.

It was added to the National Register of Historic Places in 1978.

== History and architectural features ==
Built circa 1740, this historic structure is a two-and-one-half-story, rectangular, limestone building. A two-story, four-bay, western addition and one-story rear wing was built in 1852. The building has a slate covered gable roof.

Kemp's Hotel was originally built circa 1740 by Daniel Levan, a Huguenot immigrant from Hockenheim. The home was erected on a highway that connected the Pennsylvania cities of Reading and Easton. As traffic grew, so too did the size of his home until finally, in 1765, it opened as the Levan Tavern: the first tavern in Berks County.

During its tenure as a tavern, it hosted John Adams and William Ellery, both writing in their diaries about visiting the tavern. When Daniel died in 1777, he left the tavern to his son, Daniel Jr., who eventually sold the tavern to his sister Susanna and brother-in-law, George Kemp, who renamed the tavern to the Kemp's Hotel. There are two special stones on the front face of the building bearing their names, George Kemp and Susana Kemp; both are dated 1795.

The second floor of the building has been reported to be haunted by the spirit of Susanna Kemp.

The hotel remained opened until 1852, but stayed in the Kemp family for roughly two centuries; it was then sold again and became the Whispering Springs, and later, Season's Grille. The restaurant closed in the early 2000's due to the fluctuating economy. After sitting abandoned for many years, in January 2013, Brandi Woodard bought the building and renovated it, restoring it to modern standards while also retaining aspects of its colonial architecture. It reopened in May 2013 as The Yoga House and Nectar’s Cafe & Juice Bar. On December 17, 2014, Brandi Woodard announced that she was putting the building up for sale.

The property stood vacant until June 2022, when it was purchased by Habitats for Hope as a premier comprehensive residential aftercare facility for men seeking a solid foundation for their recovery journey. It was then renamed as the "Kemp-Frieden House". The property was purchased in June of 2023 by Malachi & Kelly Duffy and renamed Vintage House Private Events.

It was added to the National Register of Historic Places in 1978.
