= Hottenstein Mansion =

Historic house in Pennsylvania, United States

- U.S. National Register of Historic Places
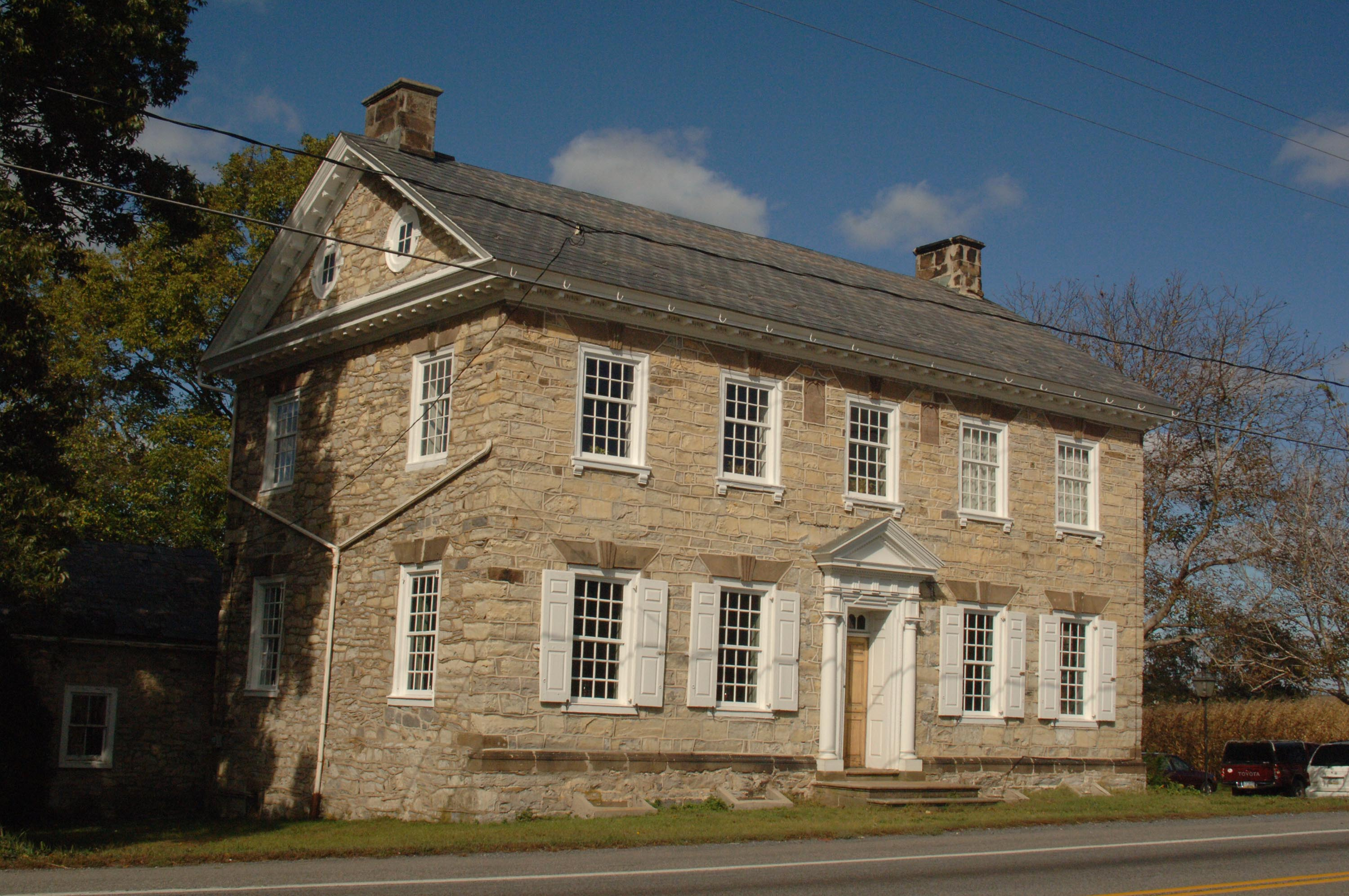
- Hottenstein Mansion, October 2007

- Location within Pennsylvania Location within the United States
- Location: 2 miles (3.2 km) east of Kutztown on U.S. Route 222, Maxatawny Township, Pennsylvania
- Coordinates: 40°32′6″N 75°44′36″W
- Area: less than one acre
- Built: 1783
- Built by: Hottenstein, David
- Architectural style: Georgian
- NRHP reference No.: 72001091
- Added to NRHP: June 22, 1972

The Hottenstein Mansion, also known as Huddestystettle, is an American historic home which is located in Maxatawny Township, Berks County, Pennsylvania.

It was listed on the National Register of Historic Places in 1972.

== History and architectural features ==
Built in 1783, his historic structure is a 2 1/2-story, limestone dwelling with red sandstone accents, and was designed in the Georgian style. A rear kitchen addition dates to the mid-nineteenth century. It has a high-pitched gable roof and features a small portico that is supported by Doric order columns and pilasters.

It was listed on the National Register of Historic Places in 1972.
