= Maxatawny, Pennsylvania =

Unincorporated community in Pennsylvania, US

- Unincorporated community & CDP
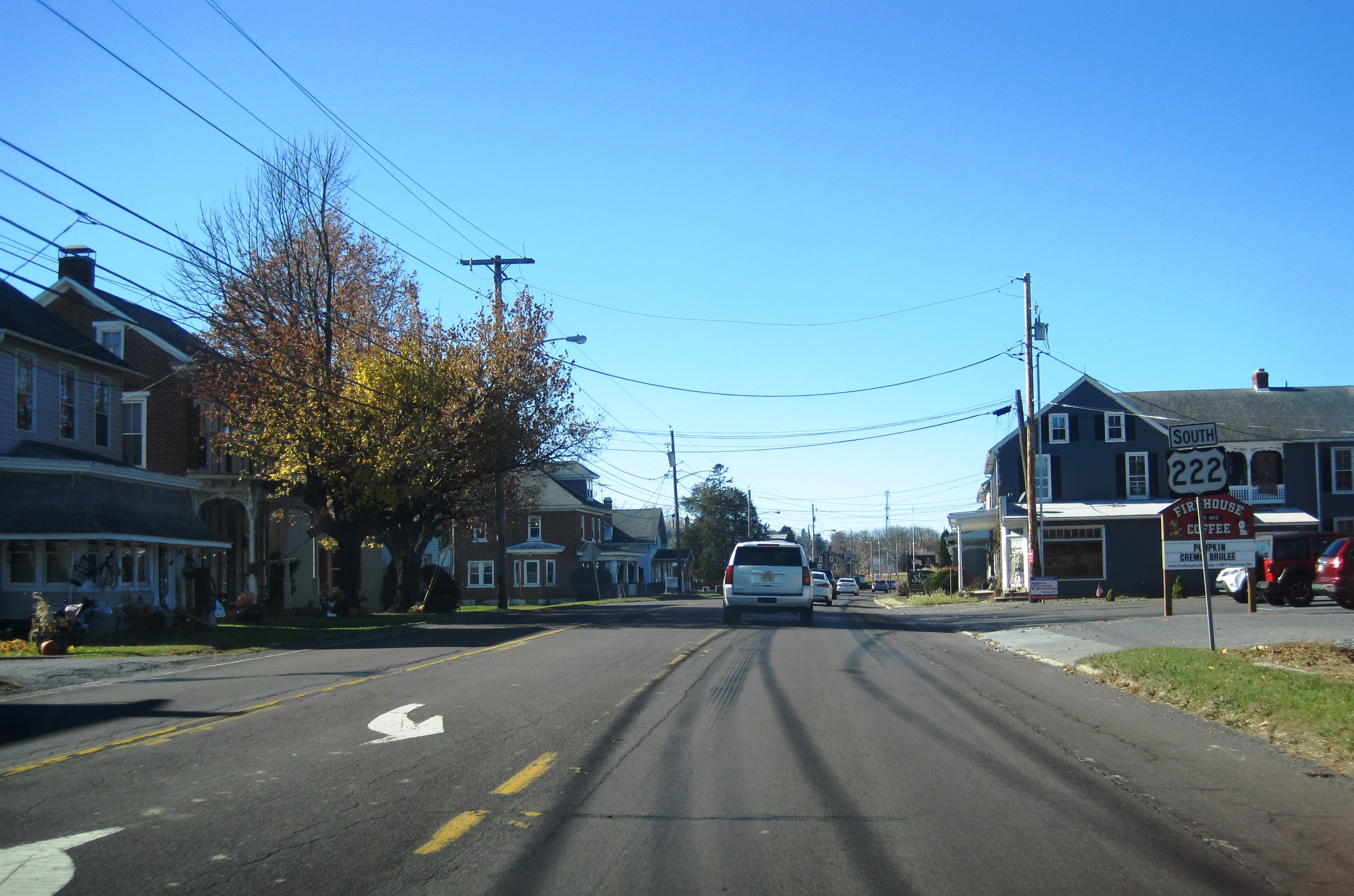
- US 222 through Maxatawny

- Location within Pennsylvania Location within the United States
- Coordinates: 40°32′33″N 75°41′20″W
- Country: United States
- State: Pennsylvania
- County: Berks
- Township: Maxatawny

Area
  - Total: 0.10 sq mi (0.26 km^{2})
  - Land: 0.10 sq mi (0.26 km^{2})
  - Water: 0 sq mi (0.00 km^{2})
- Elevation: 479 ft (146 m)

Population (2020)
  - Total: 130
  - Density: 1,290/sq mi (499/km^{2})
- Time zone: UTC-5 (Eastern (EST))
  - Summer (DST): UTC-4 (EDT)
- ZIP code: 19538
- Area codes: 610 and 484
- GNIS feature ID: 1180566

Maxatawny is an unincorporated community and census-designated place located on U.S. Route 222 in Maxatawny Township, Pennsylvania, United States, five miles east of Kutztown. It is in the Lehigh watershed and Schaefer Run flows through it to the Little Lehigh Creek. Maxatawny has a post office, with the ZIP code of 19538. Traffic speed on US 222 is reduced to 35 miles-per-hour passing through the village, which borders Lehigh County.

Historical population
Census	Pop.	Note	%±
2020	130		—
U.S. Decennial Census

== Etymology ==
The community took its name from Masatane Township.

== History ==
A post office called Maxatawny was established in 1829.
