= Tour de Donut =

Annual bicycle race in Illinois and Ohio

The Tour de Donut is an annual bicycle race held in Staunton, Illinois, and Troy, Ohio. In this unique bike event, riders' times are reduced by five minutes for each doughnut they consume during two pit stops in the nearby towns.

== History ==
The Tour de Donut was started in 1989 by a group of Southwestern Illinois cyclists who thought a race spoofing the Tour de France would be a natural. Members of the now defunct Mid-America Bicycle Club were discussing ideas for a unique ride, and the Tour de Donut was born. The Mid-America Bicycle Club folded in 1998 and former members sought a new sponsor. Since then, St. Louis' Boeing Employees Bicycle Club has sponsored the event. The race is also sponsored by the Staunton Chamber of Commerce.

== Tours ==
=== Staunton, Illinois ===
The first race started in 1989 with approximately 25 riders. The starting point and the ending point was originally Bethalto, IL. A woman won the first Tour de Donut. Over the years, the race has been moved and expanded in the route, race options and participating competitors. The race implemented RFID Chip timing for results beginning in 2011, and has seen an overall increase of competitors averaging between 800-1,600 cyclists per year of competition. Participants receive a gun time, chip time, and a donut adjusted time (5 minutes per donut eaten) once donut counts are collected. The introduction of an untimed shorter "Donut Hole" route is intended for younger or more inexperienced riders.

Competitors are able to compete for places, but also distinct rewards for performance. After the race placement awards are presented by category for Unadjusted Times, Donut Adjusted Times and Most Donuts Eaten. Door/Attendance prizes and grand prizes are also awarded.

=== Troy, Ohio ===
In September 2007 a Tour de Donut was started in Greenville, Ohio by Colavita Ohio Cycling club attracting just over 100 participants. In 2008 the event moved to Brumbaughs Fruit Farm in Arcanum and the donuts were made on site for the event and had 279 participants. 2009 had over 500 participants. The 2010 event had 603 finishers.

The 2011 event had 920 participants. The 2012 event had 1354 participants. The event moved to Downtown Arcanum in 2012 with donuts being provided by Ulbrichs in Piqua Ohio. The 2013 event had over 1600 participants and offered a free kids race for the first time that had 70 kids racing in the enclosure in Downtown Arcanum. In 2014 1976 participants took part in the 16, 32 and new Double D 64 mile courses. 100 kids participated in the free kids races. 2015 and 2016 saw event caps of 2000 participants reached.

In 2017 Tour de Donut Ohio moved to the City of Troy Ohio. Attracting 2400 participants the event continues to grow each year. Paired with Rock the Bike music festival the event drew thousands for live music, demonstrations, food and beer. The event is promoted by Extremity Sports club a division of the 501c3 not for profit Rocketship Sports Management. The annual event has grown into the largest ride one day ride in Ohio attracting all types of cyclist and fun seekers and is held the first Saturday after Labor Day.

The 12th Tour de Donut is scheduled for Saturday August 24 in Troy Ohio.

=== Greenville, Michigan ===
The event has been held at the Klackle Orchards Family Fun Farm west of Greenville, Michigan since 2009. A 30-mile race where three minutes (not the traditional five minutes) are deducted from your actual time for each donut consumed. The 2010 event had 321 finishers. This event has not taken place since 2015 being cancelled the last two years due to low attendance.

=== American Fork, Utah ===
The event has been hosted by the Rotary Club of American Fork in American Fork, Utah since 2008. A 21-mile race where three minutes (not the traditional five minutes) are deducted from your actual time for each donut consumed. The 2010 event had 245 finishers.

=== Katy, Texas ===
In July 2004, Katy, Texas started making the Tour de Donut an annual event as well. Known as the "Sweetest Bike Ride in Texas", the 28 mile race benefits the Make-A-Wish Foundation of the Texas Gulf Coast. All profits from the event are donated to the foundation. The 2010 event had 209 finishers.

=== San Luis Obispo, California ===
Annual event that began in 2011. A 20-mile untimed ride visiting 3 donut shops and a 2-mile time trial with an elevation gain of about 800 ft (250 m). Riders have 10 minutes at each shop to consume donuts and each donut results in a deduction of 15 seconds from their time.

==== Documentary film: Gluttons for Punishment ====
A documentary film, "Tour de Donut: Gluttons for Punishment", was created by Steve Kelly and Jim Klenn. The film follows two elite cyclists along the tour as they try to help their friend "out pedal and out eat the rest of the competition." The documentary features a brief history of the race and the filmmakers' biographies.

=== Seattle, Washington ===
An annual 16.3-mile self-propelled bike ride through the city of Seattle. Mighty-O Donuts created an annual pedal tour around the city fueled by donuts and coffee in 2017. This coincides with Bike to work month. In addition to creating a community event Mighty-O Donuts partners with Bike Works, an organization that promotes the bicycle as a vehicle for change, to empower youth and build resilient communities. Mighty-O also partners with Bicycle Benefits, a national program that supports cycling and local businesses.
