= OurBus =

American intercity and commuter bus service company

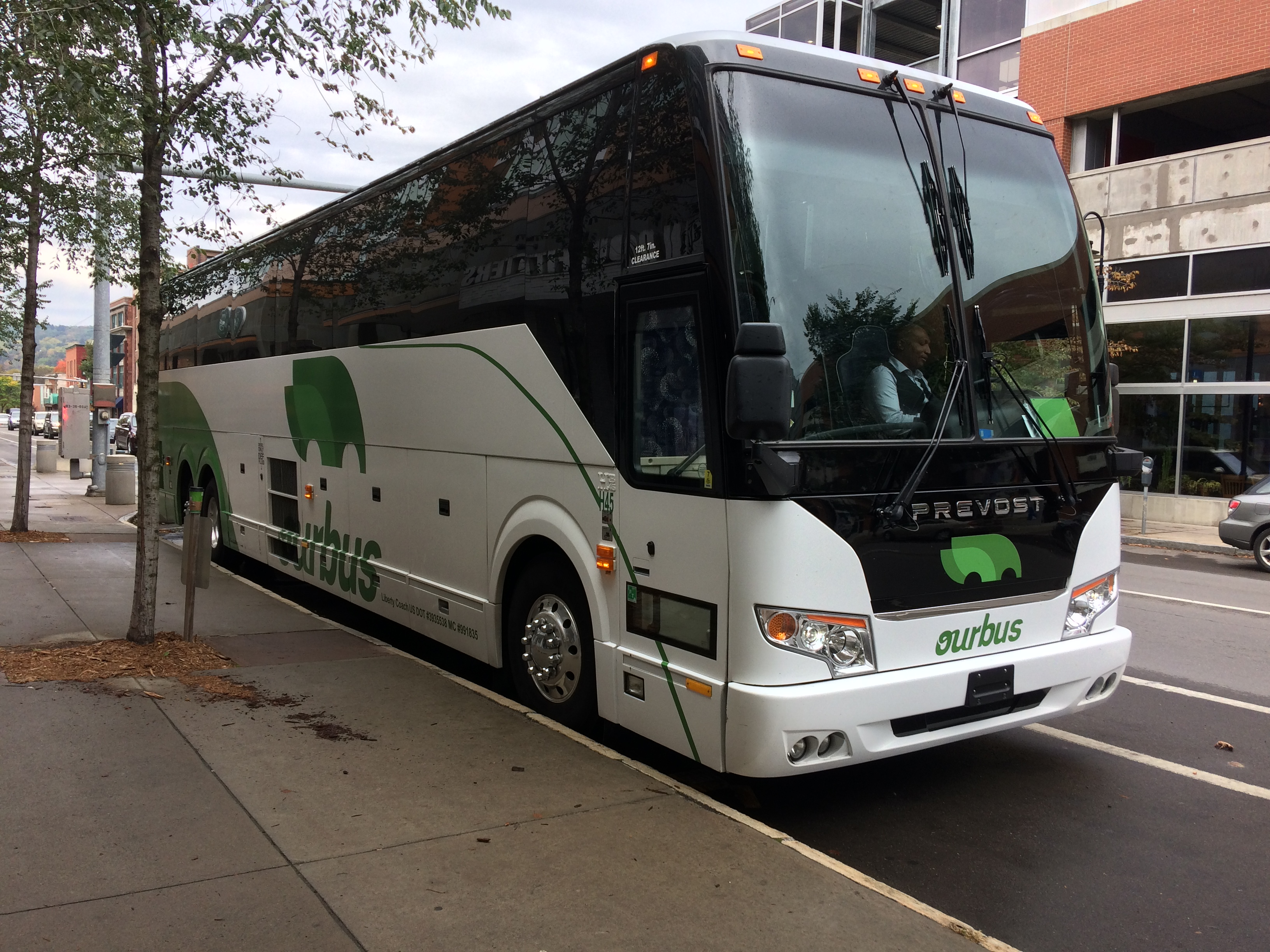
- An OurBus Prévost H3-45 picking up passengers in Ithaca, NY
- Parent: Rally OurBus
- Founded: July 2016; 10 years ago
- Headquarters: New York City, New York, U.S.
- Locale: New York, New Jersey, Pennsylvania, Delaware, Maryland, Virginia, Washington, D.C., Florida, Texas, Massachusetts, Rhode Island
- Service type: Intercity bus service
- Website: www.ourbus.com

OurBus provides intercity bus services in New York, New Jersey, Pennsylvania, Delaware, Maryland, Virginia, Washington D.C., Massachusetts, as well as in Ontario, Canada. The company serves as a broker between passengers and charter bus operators, marketing bus routes under its brand.

The company does not own or operate its fleet of buses; it handles bookings for other operators.

== History ==
The company launched in July 2016 with a route between Princeton, New Jersey and New York City. In February 2017, OurBus began service to Bethlehem, Pennsylvania. In April 2017, OurBus launched service between New Brunswick, New Jersey and Washington, DC.

In March 2021, OurBus merged with Rally, a crowdfunding travel platform for bus charters. In September 2021, OurBus launched service to/from Ontario (Niagara Falls, Mississauga, Toronto, and Scarborough) to Buffalo Airport, with connecting service to Western New York (Rochester, Geneva, Ithaca, Binghamton); Fort Lee, New Jersey; and New York City, which allows passengers to travel on one ticket from the Greater Toronto Area to New York City. In October 2021, OurBus launched service between New York City and Albany and key points in the Hudson Valley, including New Paltz and Woodbury Common Premium Outlets. On May 12, 2022, OurBus launched a new bus route between Slippery Rock and New York City.

In March 2024, OurBus launched in Canada. In September 2024, OurBus doubled service between New York City and Philadelphia. In March 2025, OurBus added summer weekend service from New York City and from Philadelphia to Longwood Gardens. In January 2026, OurBus added winter routes from New York City to ski resorts on Windham Mountain, Hunter Mountain, Belleayre Mountain and Camelback Mountain, in the Poconos. In March 2026, OurBus added frequency and stops in Bethlehem and Easton along its Lehigh Valley route (originating in Douglassville, Pennsylvania). OurBus also increased service between Ithaca, New York, and Binghamton, New York, primarily to meet additional demand from college students. In April 2026, OurBus announced service to MetLife Stadium during the 2026 FIFA World Cup.

== Services ==
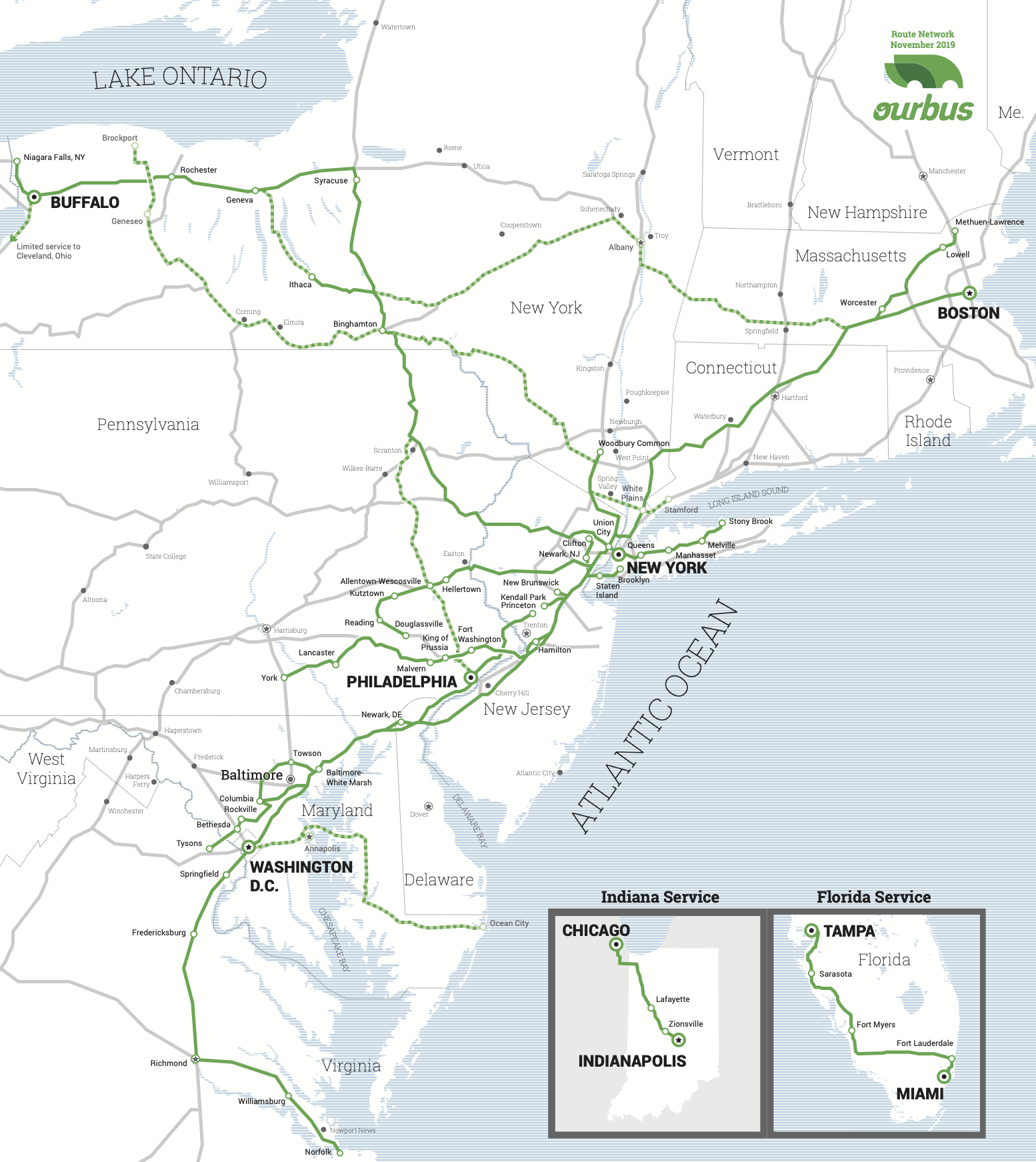
OurBus route map in 2020

=== Intercity ===
Intercity routes connect city-to-city.

New York City, NY - Philadelphia, PA
Douglassville, PA - Reading, PA - Kutztown, PA - Wescosville, PA - Hellertown, PA - New York City, NY
Methuen, MA - Boston, MA - Worcester, MA - New York City, NY
Syracuse, NY - Binghamton, NY - New York City, NY
Ithaca, NY - Binghamton, NY - New York City, NY
Columbia, MD - New York City, NY
Washington, D.C. - Hamilton, NJ - New York City, NY

=== Commuter ===
OurBus Commuter routes formerly provided daily service to commuters between suburban areas and city centers. All of the routes are no longer operating

Commuter Routes
Livingston, NJ-West Orange, NJ-New York City, NY
Kendall Park, NJ-New York City, NY
Bethlehem, PA - Allentown, PA - Wescosville, PA - Quakertown, PA - Philadelphia, PA - Camden, NJ

Another commuter route formerly operated from Pleasanton, California to San Francisco.

== See also ==
- Intercity buses in the United States
