= Klein Transportation =

American bus operator

- Founded: 1957
- Headquarters: Douglassville, Pennsylvania
- Service area: Eastern Pennsylvania, New York City
- Service type: Intercity bus, charter bus, tours
- Website: www.kleintransportation.com

Klein Transportation is a bus provider based in Douglassville, Pennsylvania. Founded in 1957 initially as a school bus service provider, the company started offering charter buses and tours in 1979 and intercity commuter routes in February 2019.

== Service ==
Klein operates an intercity commuter bus route from Douglassville to Midtown Manhattan in New York City. Intermediate stops are located in Reading (downtown Reading and at the Boscov's at the former Fairgrounds Square Mall), Kutztown, Wescosville, and Hellertown.

The company provides charter bus and school bus service in the Reading, Pottstown, King of Prussia, and Philadelphia areas. Klein offers motorcoach tours to various locations in the Mid-Atlantic states including cities such as New York City, Philadelphia, Baltimore, and Washington, D.C.; the Pocono Mountains; and beaches at the Jersey Shore and Ocean City, Maryland. Klein also operates casino bus service to Atlantic City, Wind Creek Bethlehem, and Mohegan Sun Pocono; with some casino packages offering free slot play. The buses to Atlantic City offer departures from Shillington, Douglassville, Royersford, and Audubon. The buses to Wind Creek Bethlehem offer departures from Douglassville, Shillington, Laureldale, and Kutztown. The buses to Mohegan Sun Pocono offer departures from Douglassville, Shillington, Laureldale, and Kutztown. Klein also offers planning for school trips, which includes school bus and motorcoach rental.

== History ==
The company began in 1957, when John Klein started a school bus contracting service in the Pottstown, Pennsylvania area, serving the Daniel Boone Area School District. They were extremely successful in the early years, and continue to operate that first contract with Daniel Boone Area School District in addition to several other school transport contracts. John Klein's son William took over the company in the early 1960s and ran it until his death in 2000. In 1979, the company became a Public Carrier; the same year, William Klein's wife Mary started Klein Tours. Mary Klein retired from daily responsibilities in the business in 1999. Wayne Klein became president of the company in 1999 after William and Mary Klein retired and took over ownership in November 2008 upon the death of Mary Klein.

In addition to their robust half century of solid Berks County business, Klein started to develop a reputation in the Schuylkill River Valley with many services running to the King of Prussia or Philadelphia areas in the 90s and 2000s.

On February 8, 2019, the company announced that it was joining the commuter bus business, with a route from Douglassville to Midtown Manhattan in New York City that would replace a route formerly operated by Bieber Transportation Group, which went out of business the same day. Service began on the following Monday, February 11, in partnership with OurBus.
