= Kutztown Area High School =

Location
- 50 Trexler Avenue; Kutztown, Pennsylvania 19530; United States; 40.5133°N 75.7686°W

Information
- Type: Public high school
- School district: Kutztown Area School District
- NCES School ID: 421293000816
- Principal: Matthew Campbell
- Teaching staff: 31.15 (on an FTE basis)
- Grades: 9–12
- Enrollment: 434 (2023-2024)
- Student to teacher ratio: 13.93
- Colors: Navy Blue and White
- Mascot: Cougar
- Website: khs.kasd.org

Kutztown Area High School is a public high school in Kutztown, Pennsylvania, United States. It was built in 1961, with an annex added in 1974 and underwent major renovations in 2016. It is part of the Kutztown Area School District.

The school supplies Apple MacBook Air laptops to every student as part of the "one-to-one laptop initiative" It is infamous for its group of thirteen students, referred to as the "Kutztown 13", who violated its technology code of conduct and were subjected to external disciplinary action in 2005.

== The Kutztown 13 ==
In October 2004, the school distributed Apple iBook laptops to all students, as part of the "One-to-One" program to facilitate school work. Each computer was installed with safety instruments. Access to the safety and monitor settings was available via the use of an administrator password.

The school administrators initially set the administrator password on all laptops to "50Trexler", presumably in reference to the street address of the school. Multiple media reports indicated that the password was "taped onto the back of each computer" when they were initially handed out. What was actually on the back was a permanently affixed label with the school's address, (including 50 Trexler Ave) although the Kutztown Area High School Administration did realize that the password should have been less obvious. A student or students found out the password, and eventually 200 to 300 students had knowledge of the password.

These students were then able to bypass the school's security system to access chat software, freely view web pages previously blocked by school policy, install file sharing applications, video games, and other unauthorized software, and reverse the installed monitoring software to spy on other students and faculty. The school repeatedly disciplined students for these offenses, from detentions and leading to suspensions for repeated policy violations. With each disciplinary action given, the school claimed that parents were notified.

On May 2, 2005, school administrators contacted the Kutztown Borough Police Department with a request to investigate, and possibly prosecute, 13 students for violating the school's Acceptable Use Policy after they repeatedly modified their laptops. The parents of the students were not notified of this criminal investigation because the school was afraid the parents would not be pleased that pictures were being taken of the students, through the computers, at home. Much of the information released to the media was from the uncle of one of the 13 students and based on comments by the students; Pennsylvania law prohibits a school from discussing discipline cases.

On May 31, 2005 the police notified the parents of 13 students that their children were being charged under Pennsylvania crimes code section 7615 for computer trespass, a 3rd degree felony according to Pennsylvania law.

In late August 2005, the Berks County juvenile probation office offered to drop all charges in exchange for 15 hours of community service, a letter of apology, a class on personal responsibility and a limited probation period. One student did not accept these conditions. He was later emancipated of all charges.

== Notable alumni ==
- G Rene Ryan, swimmer
- Keith Haring, artist
- Gary Mark Smith, photographer and artist
