= Bieber Transportation Group =

Former American bus company from Pennsylvania

- Founded: 1946
- Defunct: February 8, 2019
- Headquarters: Kutztown, Pennsylvania, U.S.
- Service area: Lehigh Valley, Pennsylvania, New York City
- Service type: Intercity bus, charter bus, tours
- Website: archived page

Bieber Transportation Group was an American bus company based in Kutztown, Pennsylvania, operating intercity commuter buses, charter buses, and tours. The company provided bus service from the Reading and Lehigh Valley regions of eastern Pennsylvania to Philadelphia and New York City. The company was founded by Carl R. Bieber in 1946. Bieber ended operations on February 8, 2019.

== Service ==
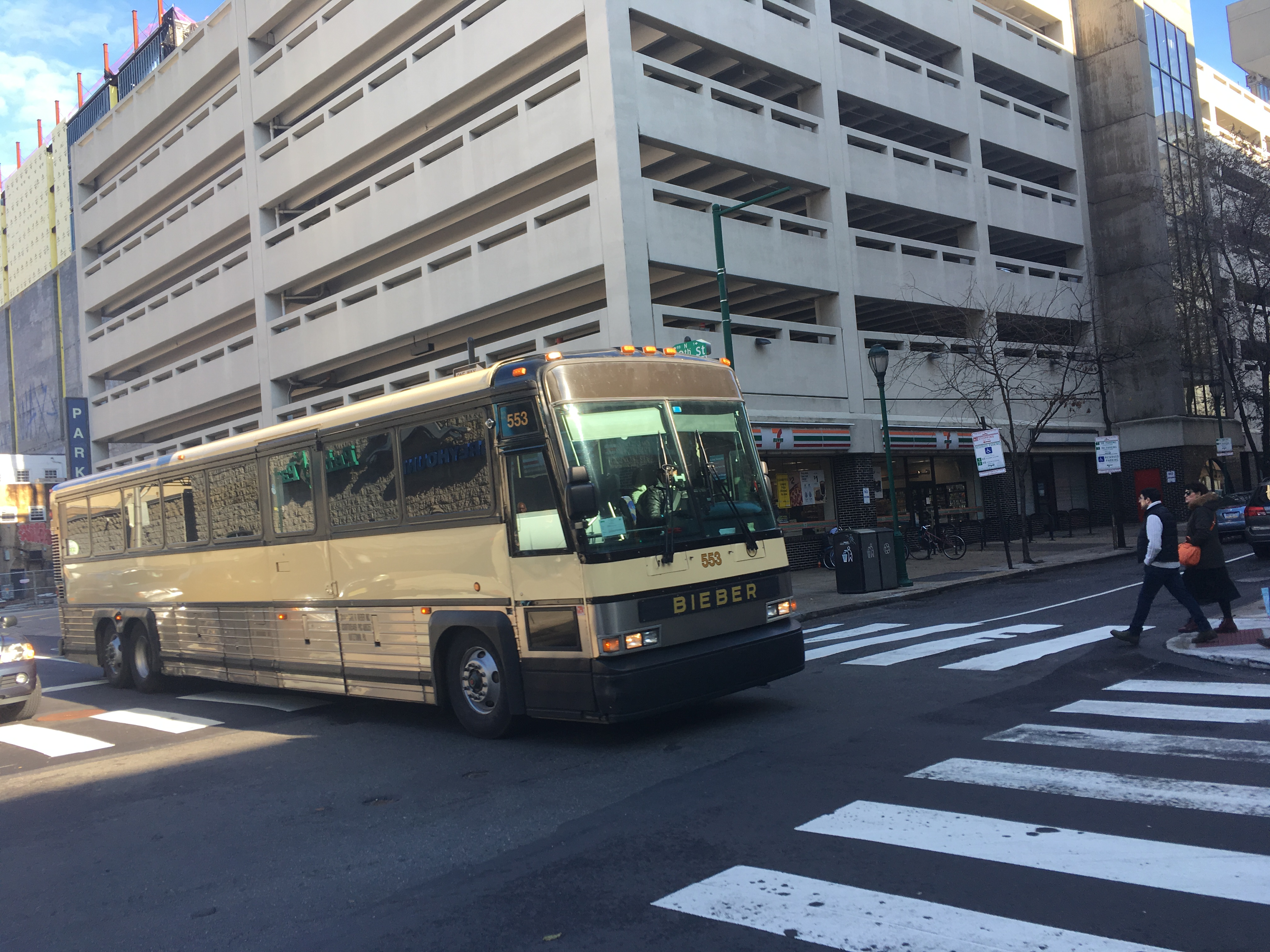
A Bieber bus at S. 10th and Filbert Streets in Philadelphia

Prior to ending operations in 2019, Bieber Transportation Group provided intercity commuter bus service from points in eastern Pennsylvania to Philadelphia and the intersection of 8th Avenue and 39th Street in the Midtown Manhattan section of New York City. Service was provided daily along a route running from Reading and the Lehigh Valley to Philadelphia and a route running from Reading and the Lehigh Valley to New York City. Bieber offered one-way and round-trip tickets along with commuter books offering multiple tickets for commuters to use in a 30-day period.

Bieber also offered tour bus service to domestic and international destinations, including casino excursions to Atlantic City. The company offered charters for groups for single-day or multi-day trips along with weddings, airport transfers, casino excursions, and cruise ports.

== Stop locations ==
City	Stop location(s)	Source
Allentown, Pennsylvania	Allentown Bus Terminal	
Bethlehem, Pennsylvania	LANta Metro Mart	
Bethlehem, Pennsylvania	Sands Casino Resort Bethlehem	
Hellertown, Pennsylvania	Top Star Exxon (tickets); Hellertown park and ride (bus stop)	
Kutztown, Pennsylvania	Bieber Bus Terminal	
New York City	8th Avenue and 39th Street	
Philadelphia	Philadelphia Greyhound Terminal	
Philadelphia	JFK Boulevard between Broad and 15th streets (pick-up only)	
Philadelphia	30th Street Station	
Quakertown, Pennsylvania	Top Star Exxon (tickets); Quakertown park and ride (bus stop)	
Reading, Pennsylvania	Inter-City Bus Terminal	
Wescosville, Pennsylvania	Charcoal park and ride	

== Fleet ==
Bieber Transportation Group had a fleet of 54 buses, which included several luxury coaches. The fleet consisted of tour buses manufactured by Motor Coach Industries, Prevost, and Van Hool that can seat between 33 and 56 passengers. Amenities on the buses included heating and air conditioning, restrooms, PA system, DVD players, and AM/FM CD stereo.

== Partnerships ==
Bieber Transportation Group served as the exclusive motorcoach carrier for sports teams such as the Lehigh Valley Phantoms, Lehigh Valley IronPigs, and the Reading Royals. The company also provided transportation to the sports teams of Muhlenberg College and DeSales University. Bieber formerly maintained a transportation relationship with Kutztown University athletics.

== History ==
=== 20th century ===
Carl R. Bieber Sr. opened a trucking company in Kutztown in 1928. He gradually added buses to his fleet; in 1946 the company began charter bus service from the Lehigh Valley. In 1976, Bieber's son Carl R. Bieber Jr. took over the company. Company founder Carl R. Bieber died in 1991.

=== 21st century ===
In 2001, Bieber Jr. sold the company to Steven G. Haddad, who kept the Bieber name. Bieber Jr. died on June 10, 2005, at the age of 62. Bieber acquired competitor Capitol Trailways in 2008.

In October 2016, Bieber suspended service on a route from Schuylkill Haven and Pottsville to Reading and Philadelphia. In March 2018, Bieber ended bus service along a route connecting York, Lancaster, Pottstown, Limerick, and Norristown to New York City.

In 2017, Bieber paid a $20,000 settlement to the U.S. Department of Justice for failing to comply with the Americans with Disabilities Act. In 2018, the Internal Revenue Service filed a $915,736 lien against Bieber while the state of Pennsylvania filed a $187,143 lien against the company. In May 2018, a Berks County judge ordered Bieber to pay First National Bank of Pennsylvania $450,968 as part of a lawsuit. Bieber put their bus terminal in Reading up for sale in 2018.

On July 28, 2018, the Bieber bus stop in New York City moved from the Port Authority Bus Terminal to 383 Madison Avenue at East 47th Street due to an unpaid $214,000 bill to the Port Authority of New York and New Jersey for use of the terminal. Bieber had previously missed payments to the Port Authority of New York and New Jersey and was threatened with termination notices in 2008, 2010, and 2012; with the termination in 2018 being permanent. Trans-Bridge Lines took over Bieber's gate at Port Authority Bus Terminal and implemented service from Wescosville and Hellertown to New York City.

On August 20, 2018, the stop in New York City moved to West 31st Street between 7th and 8th Avenues. Starting August 27, 2018, Bieber buses heading toward New York City ran to the Weehawken Port Imperial ferry terminal in Weehawken, New Jersey, where a NY Waterway ferry provided a connection across the Hudson River to New York City; the ferry ride was included in the price of the bus ticket. On November 6, 2018, Bieber buses resumed direct service into New York City with a stop at the intersection of 8th Avenue and 39th Street, with service to Weehawken Port Imperial discontinued.

On February 8, 2019, Bieber abruptly cancelled all bus service and later announced that the company was going out of business after 72 years due to decreasing ridership and increasing expenses. During the closing, employees of the company were having trouble getting their paychecks and were seen packing up their belongings at the company headquarters in Kutztown.
