= Inter-City Bus Terminal (Reading, Pennsylvania) =

Coordinates: 40°20′10″N 75°55′55.5″W

Inter-City Bus Terminal (ICBT) was the primary regional transportation hub serving Berks County, Pennsylvania. Located in downtown Reading, ICBT had daily service to Philadelphia, New York City, and Harrisburg, Pennsylvania via Greyhound Bus Lines and Klein Transportation. Until 2019, Bieber Transportation Group also served the terminal.

BARTA has a hub at nearby BARTA Transit Center, but as of 2020, there is only one inter-city route (operated by Ourbus) for passengers from the Berks County area, connecting to New York City.

The site was sold in May 2019 for use as a parking lot.
