= Kutztown 1892 Public School Building =

- U.S. National Register of Historic Places
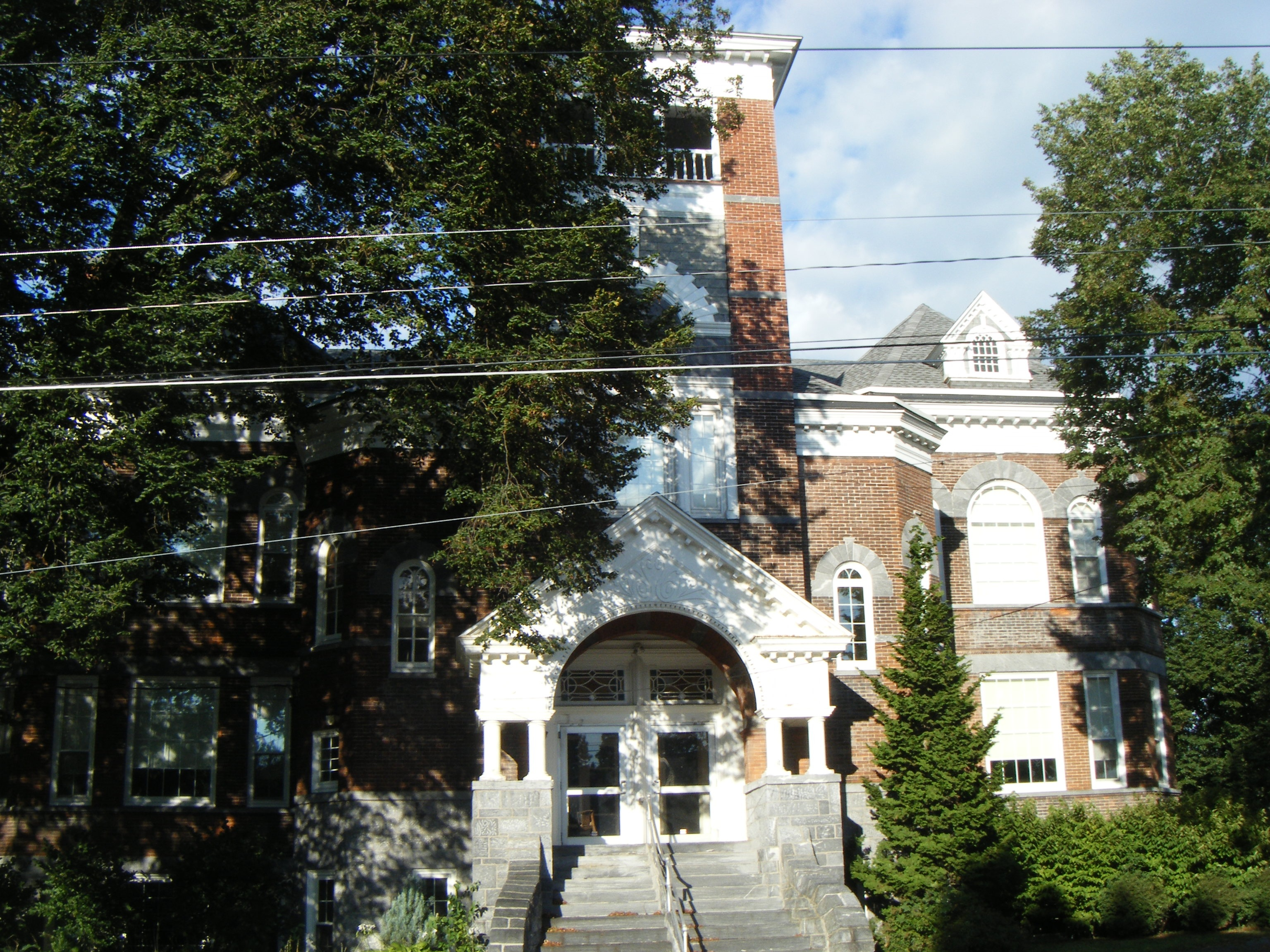
- Kutztown 1892 Public School Building, August 2011

- Location within Pennsylvania Location within the United States
- Location: White Oak and Normal Ave., Kutztown, Pennsylvania
- Coordinates: 40°30′47″N 75°46′34″W
- Area: 0.8 acres (0.32 ha)
- Built: 1892
- Architect: Bean, M B.; Klein & Dietrich
- Architectural style: Late Victorian
- NRHP reference No.: 80003425
- Added to NRHP: June 27, 1980

The Kutztown 1892 Public School Building is an historic school building in Kutztown, Berks County, Pennsylvania, United States.

It was added to the National Register of Historic Places in 1980.

== History and architectural features ==
Built in 1892, this historic structure is a two-story, brick and stone building that was designed in the Late Victorian style. It has eight rooms and features a three-story bell tower and arched and pedimented porch supported by four columns. A fire tower addition was built in 1936. It served as a school annex until 1977, after which it housed the Kutztown Historical Society and community meeting hall.

== Kutztown Historical Society Museum ==
The Kutztown Historical Society purchased this building in 1979. It uses it as a museum of local history and as the society's headquarters. The museum's collections include antique textile implements, toys, books, farm implements, fire equipment, clothing, schoolroom items, weapons and other items of area cultural and historical importance.
