= Anna Kunkel =

American baseball player

- Outfielder
- Born: March 18, 1932; Wescosville, Pennsylvania, U.S.
- Died: October 1, 2006 (aged 74); Chandler, Arizona, U.S.
- Batted: Left Threw: Left

Teams
- South Bend Blue Sox (1950–1951)

Career highlights and awards
- Women in Baseball – AAGPBL Permanent Display at the Baseball Hall of Fame and Museum (since 1988)

Anna Maggie Kunkel [Huff] (March 18, 1932 – October 1, 2006) was an American fourth outfielder who played in the All-American Girls Professional Baseball League (AAGPBL). Listed at 5' 2", 112 lb., Kunkel batted and threw left handed. She was dubbed Kunk.

== Early life ==
Kunkel was born in Wescosville, Pennsylvania, on March 18, 1932.

== Career ==
She played for the South Bend Blue Sox club during its 1950 and 1951 seasons. Her career ended early due to a knee injury. Kunkel had surgery and returned to action, but her knee did not hold up. As a result, she appeared in just 11 games over the two seasons. The league stopped recording individual achievements after 1948, so individual accomplishments are complete only through 1948.

The All-American Girls Professional Baseball League folded in 1954. In November 1988, a permanent display in honor of the league was developed at the Baseball Hall of Fame in Cooperstown, New York. Anna Kunkel, along with the rest of the girls and the league staff, is included at the exhibit.

Kunkel later moved to Tucson, Arizona, where she worked for the Arizona Department of Corrections.

== Death ==
Kunkel died on October 1, 2006, in Chandler, Arizona, and was interred in Granger, Indiana.
