= Kutztown Area School District =

School district in Pennsylvania

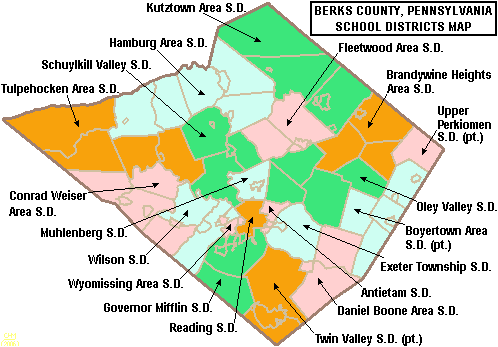

The Kutztown Area School District is a public school district serving parts of Berks County, Pennsylvania. It encompasses the communities of Kutztown, Lyons, Maxatawny Township, Greenwich Township, Lenhartsville, and Albany Township. It features two elementary schools (Kutztown Elementary School and Greenwich Elementary School), one middle school (Kutztown Area Middle School), and one high school (Kutztown Area High School).
