= Kutztown, Pennsylvania =

Borough in Pennsylvania, US

Kutztown, Pennsylvania Kutzeschteddel
- Borough
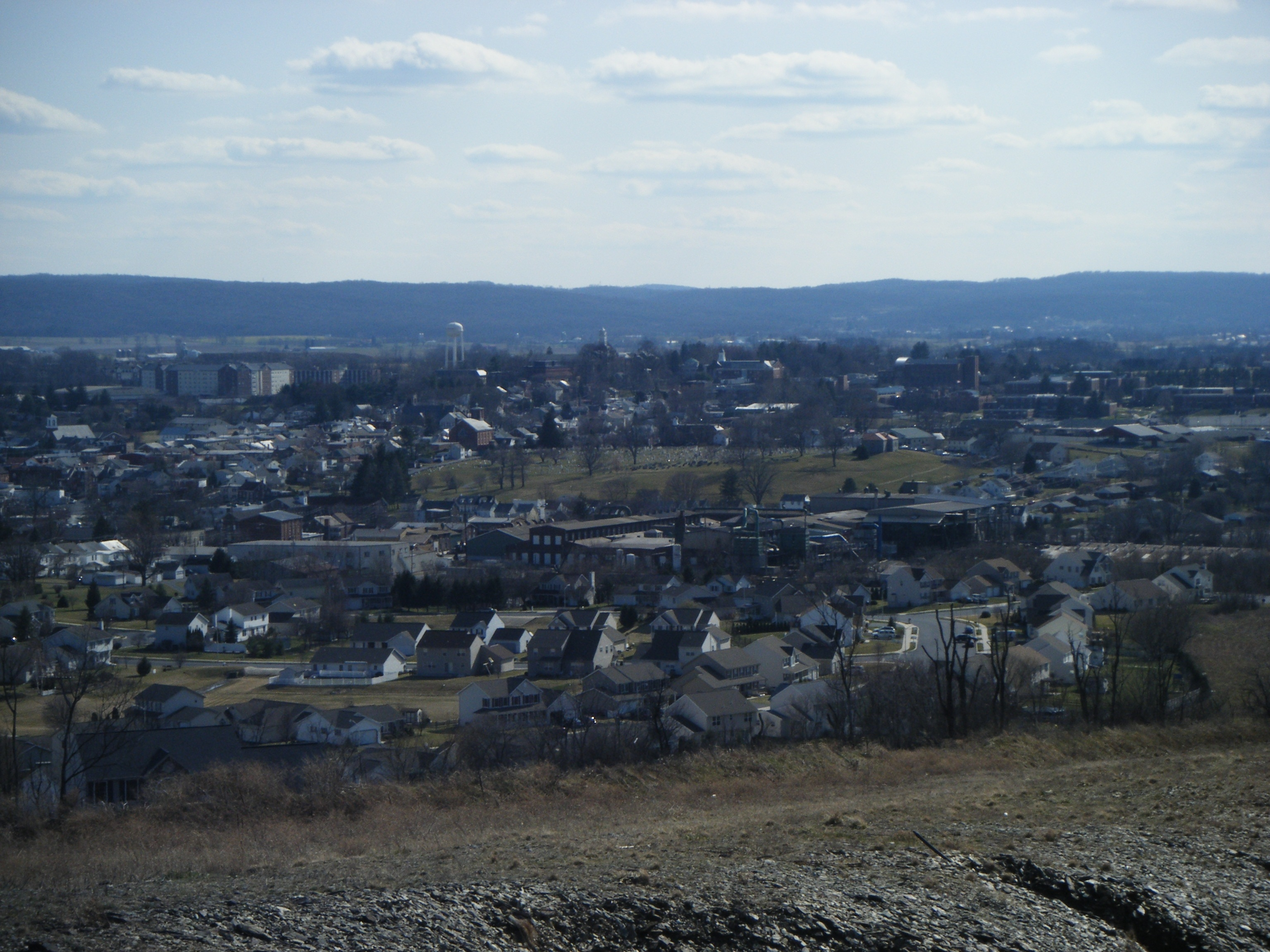
- Kutztown in March 2011

- Seal

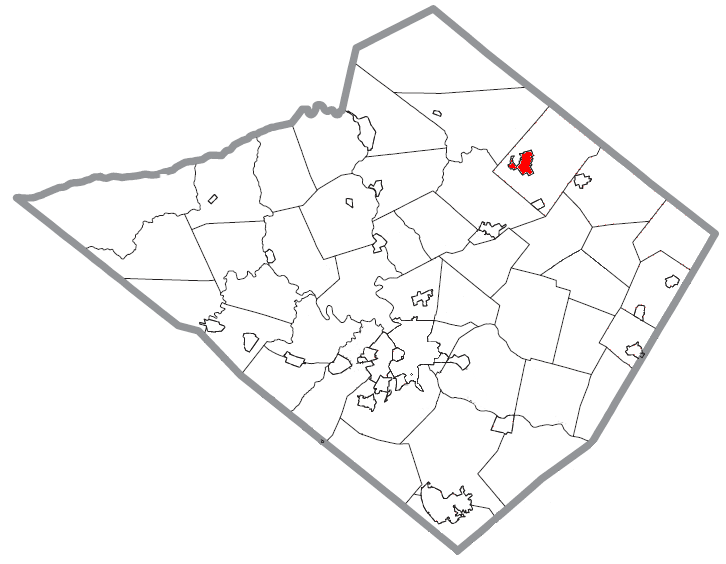
- Location of Kutztown in Berks County, Pennsylvania

- Location of Kutztown in Pennsylvania Kutztown (the United States)
- Coordinates: 40°31′11″N 75°46′31″W
- Country: United States
- State: Pennsylvania
- County: Berks
- Incorporated: April 6, 1815
- Named for: George Kutz

Government
  - Type: Mayor-council
  - Mayor: James F. Schlegel (D)

Area
  - Total: 1.61 sq mi (4.16 km^{2})
  - Land: 1.60 sq mi (4.15 km^{2})
  - Water: 0.0039 sq mi (0.01 km^{2})
- Elevation: 400 ft (120 m)

Population (2020)
  - Total: 4,162
  - Density: 2,600.5/sq mi (1,004.07/km^{2})
- Time zone: UTC-5 (EST)
  - Summer (DST): UTC-4 (EDT)
- ZIP Code: 19530
- Area codes: 610 and 484
- FIPS code: 42-40656
- Website: www.kutztownboro.org

Kutztown (Pennsylvania German: Kutzeschteddel) is a borough in Berks County, Pennsylvania, United States. It is located 18 miles (29 km) southwest of Allentown and 17 miles (27 km) northeast of Reading. As of the 2020 census, the borough had a population of 4,162. Kutztown University of Pennsylvania is located just outside the borough limits to the southwest.

== History ==
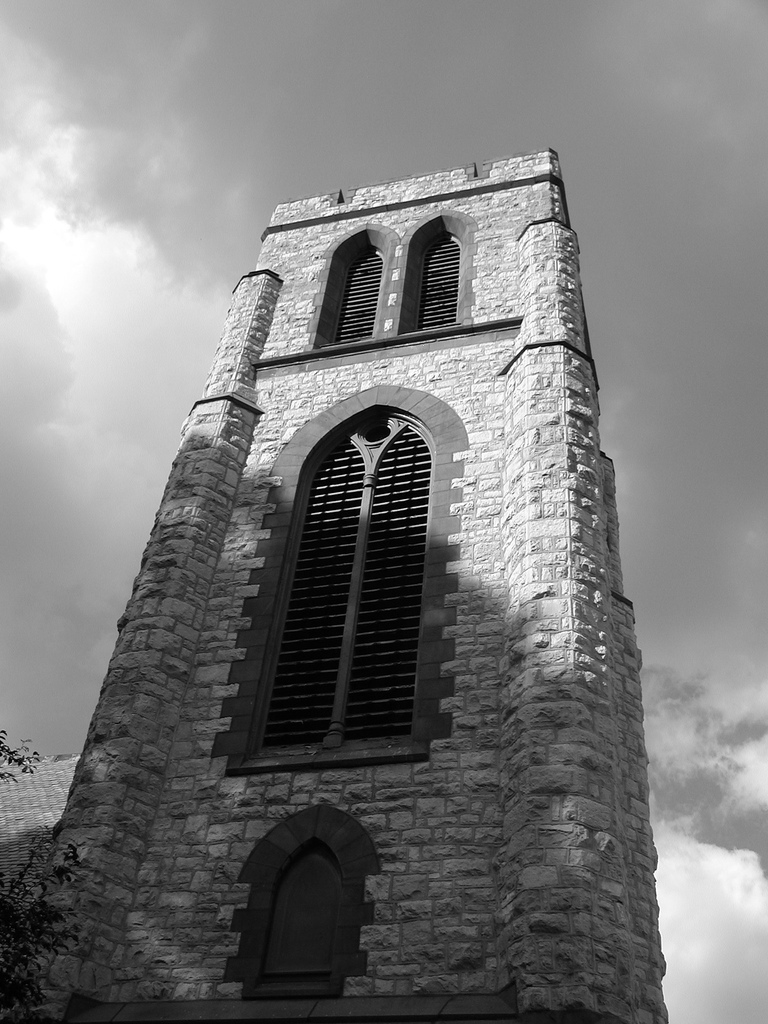
Trinity Lutheran Church in Kutztown

George (Coots) Kutz purchased 130 acres (53 ha) of land that became Kutztown on June 16, 1755, from Peter Wentz who owned much of what is present-day Maxatawny Township. Kutz first laid out his plans for the town in 1779. The first lots in the new town of Cootstown, later renamed Kutztown, were purchased in 1785 by Adam Dietrich and Henry Schweier.

Kutztown was incorporated as a borough on April 7, 1815, and is the second oldest borough in Berks County after Reading, which became a borough in 1783 and became a city in 1847.

Like most of Berks County, Kutztown was settled predominantly by Germans, most of whom came from the Palatinate region of southwest Germany, which borders the Rhine river.

The Kutztown area encompasses an area of land also known as the East Penn Valley, a broad limestone valley situated in northern and eastern Berks County, bounded by the Blue Mountain and South Mountain ranges to the north and south, respectively, by the Lehigh County border to the east, and by Ontelaunee Creek (Maiden Creek) to the west. Crystal Cave was discovered near Kutztown in 1871.

The H.K. Deisher Knitting Mill and Kutztown 1892 Public School Building are listed on the National Register of Historic Places.

Since 1950, the Kutztown Folk Festival has been held in early July celebrating the culture, artistry, and culinary delights of the Pennsylvania Dutch.

== Geography ==
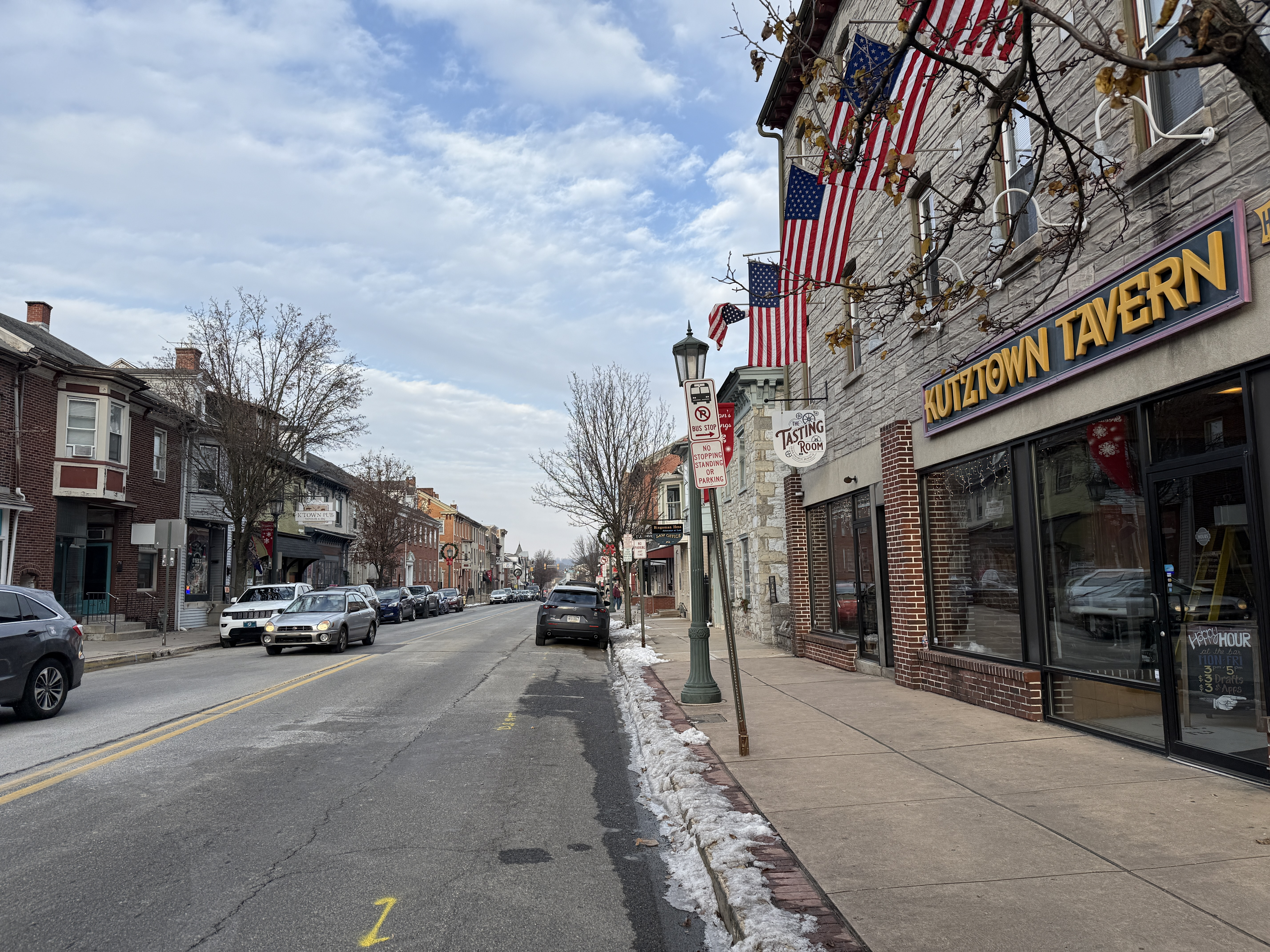
West Main Street from Whiteoak Street

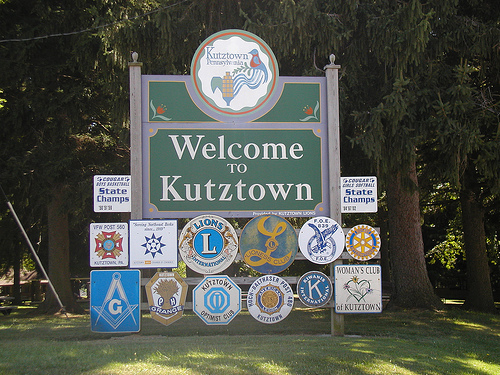
A "Welcome to Kutztown" sign on East Main Street by the northeastern entrance to Kutztown Park

Kutztown is located in northeastern Berks County, Pennsylvania, at 40°31′11″N 75°46′31″W (40.519798, -75.775260). It is surrounded by Maxatawny Township but is separate from it.

According to the U.S. Census Bureau, the borough has a total area of 1.7 square miles (4.3 km^{2}), of which 0.004 square miles (0.01 km^{2}), or 0.33%, is water. Kutztown has a hot-summer humid continental climate (Dfa) and average monthly temperatures range from 28.9 °F (−1.7 °C) in January to 73.7 °F (23.2 °C) in July. The hardiness zone is 7a.

== Demographics ==
Historical population
Census	Pop.	Note	%±
1840	693		—
1850	640		−7.6%
1860	915		43.0%
1870	945		3.3%
1880	1,198		26.8%
1890	1,595		33.1%
1900	1,328		−16.7%
1910	2,360		77.7%
1920	2,684		13.7%
1930	2,841		5.8%
1940	2,966		4.4%
1950	3,110		4.9%
1960	3,312		6.5%
1970	4,166		25.8%
1980	4,040		−3.0%
1990	4,704		16.4%
2000	5,067		7.7%
2010	5,012		−1.1%
2020	4,162		−17.0%

=== 2020 census ===
As of the 2020 census, Kutztown had a population of 4,162. The median age was 37.6 years. 17.5% of residents were under the age of 18 and 20.6% were 65 years of age or older. For every 100 females there were 90.4 males, and for every 100 females age 18 and over there were 87.8 males age 18 and over.

100.0% of residents lived in urban areas, while 0.0% lived in rural areas.

There were 1,814 households in Kutztown, of which 22.9% had children under the age of 18 living in them. Of all households, 37.7% were married-couple households, 22.8% were households with a male householder and no spouse or partner present, and 32.0% were households with a female householder and no spouse or partner present. About 36.3% of all households were made up of individuals and 15.2% had someone living alone who was 65 years of age or older.

There were 2,184 housing units, of which 16.9% were vacant. The homeowner vacancy rate was 1.3% and the rental vacancy rate was 24.7%.

Racial composition as of the 2020 census
Race	Number	Percent
White	3,692	88.7%
Black or African American	103	2.5%
American Indian and Alaska Native	9	0.2%
Asian	50	1.2%
Native Hawaiian and Other Pacific Islander	9	0.2%
Some other race	68	1.6%
Two or more races	231	5.6%
Hispanic or Latino (of any race)	267	6.4%

=== 2010 census ===
As of the 2010 census, there were 5,012 people living in the borough. The racial makeup of the borough was 95.8% White, 1.4% African American, 0.0% Native American, 1.0% Asian, 0.0% Native Hawaiian, 0.8% from other races, and 1.0% from two or more races. Hispanic or Latino of any race were 2.6% of the population.

There were 1,874 households, out of which 18.7% had children under the age of 18 living with them, 37.6% were married couples living together, 7.1% had a female householder with no husband present, and 52.7% were non-families. 26.7% of all households were made up of individuals, and 13.2% had someone living alone who was 65 years of age or older. The average household size was 2.49 and the average family size was 2.80.

In the borough, the population was spread out, with 12.4% under the age of 18, 38.7% from 18 to 24, 19.0% from 25 to 44, 13.8% from 45 to 64, and 16.2% who were 65 years of age or older. The median age was 24 years. For every 100 females, there were 91.4 males. For every 100 females age 18 and over, there were 89.3 males.

The median income for a household in the borough was $35,677, and the median income for a family was $49,653. Males had a median income of $33,438 versus $28,669 for females. The per capita income for the borough was $18,803. About 3.8% of families and 29.4% of the population were below the poverty line, including 6.6% of those under age 18 and 5.7% of those age 65 or over.

=== Religion ===
The Kutztown area is home to an Old Order Mennonite community consisting of about 160 families. The Old Order Mennonites in the area belong to the Groffdale Conference Mennonite Church and use the horse and buggy as transportation. There are several farms in the area belonging to the Old Order Mennonite community and a meetinghouse is located south of Kutztown. The Old Order Mennonites first bought land in the area in 1949.

== Government ==
Kutztown has a mayor–council system of government with a mayor and a six-member council. As of 2019, the mayor of Kutztown is James F. Schlegel (D) and the council members are Council President Kevin J. Snyder (R), Council Vice President Derek D. Mace (D), Council President Pro Tempore Scott R. Piscitelli (R), Edwin K. Seyler (R), Richard J. Diehm (D), and Arabel J. Elliott (D).

Police services in the borough are provided by the Kutztown Police Department, which consists of twelve full-time officers. Fire protection in Kutztown and the surrounding areas is provided by the Kutztown Fire Department, a volunteer fire department with 30 members and six pieces of equipment.

== Education ==
=== Primary and secondary ===
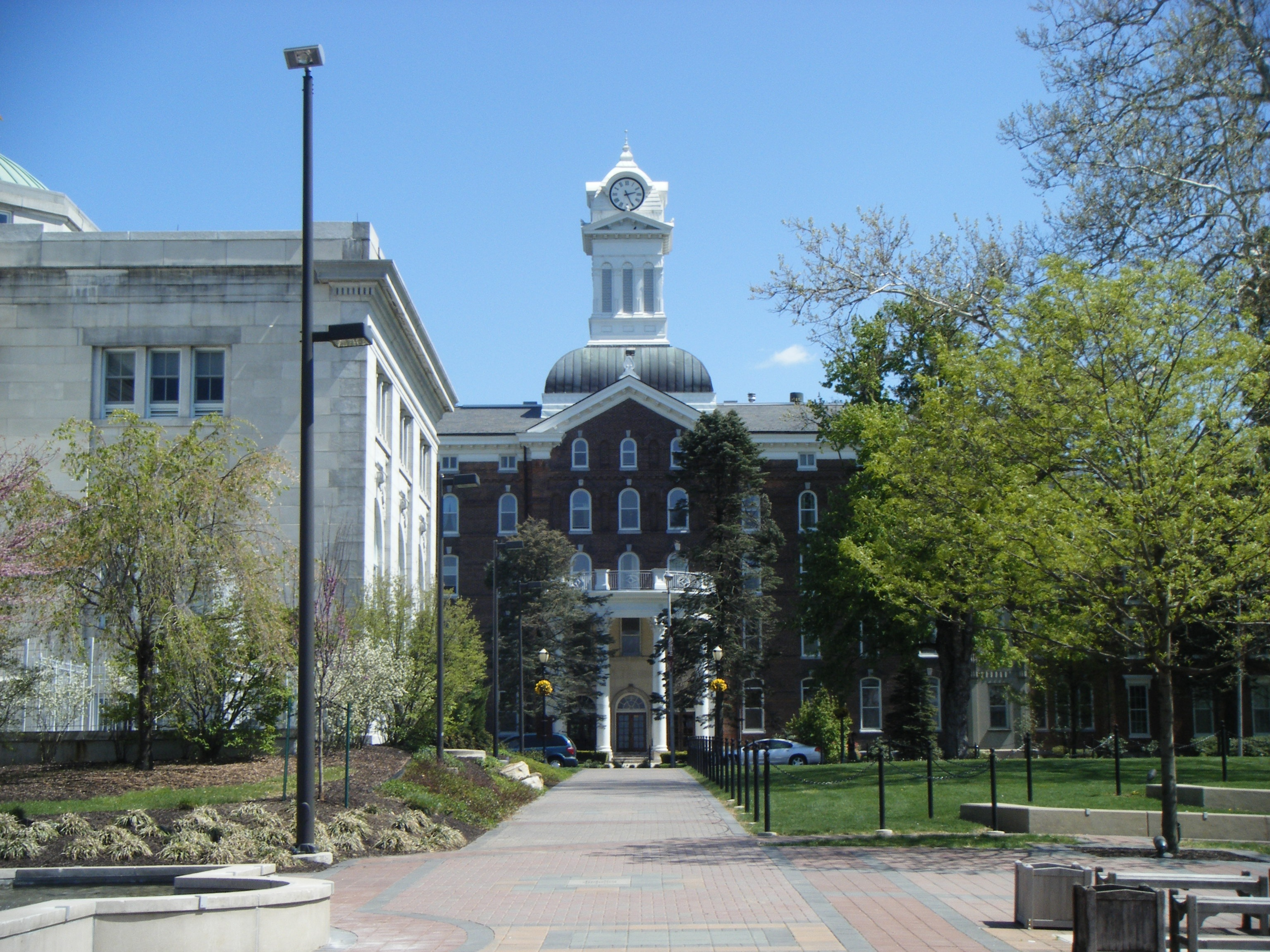
Old Main at Kutztown University of Pennsylvania

Public school students in Kutztown, along with Lyons, Maxatawny Township, Greenwich Township, Lenhartsville, and Albany Township, are served by the Kutztown Area School District. Schools in the district serving the borough include Greenwich Elementary School, Kutztown Elementary School, Kutztown Area Middle School, and Kutztown Area High School.

=== Higher education ===
Kutztown University of Pennsylvania is a four-year public university located just outside the borough to the southwest. The university, which is one of the 14 schools of the Pennsylvania State System of Higher Education, has an enrollment of 7,391 undergraduates and 918 postgraduates.

== Infrastructure ==
=== Transportation ===
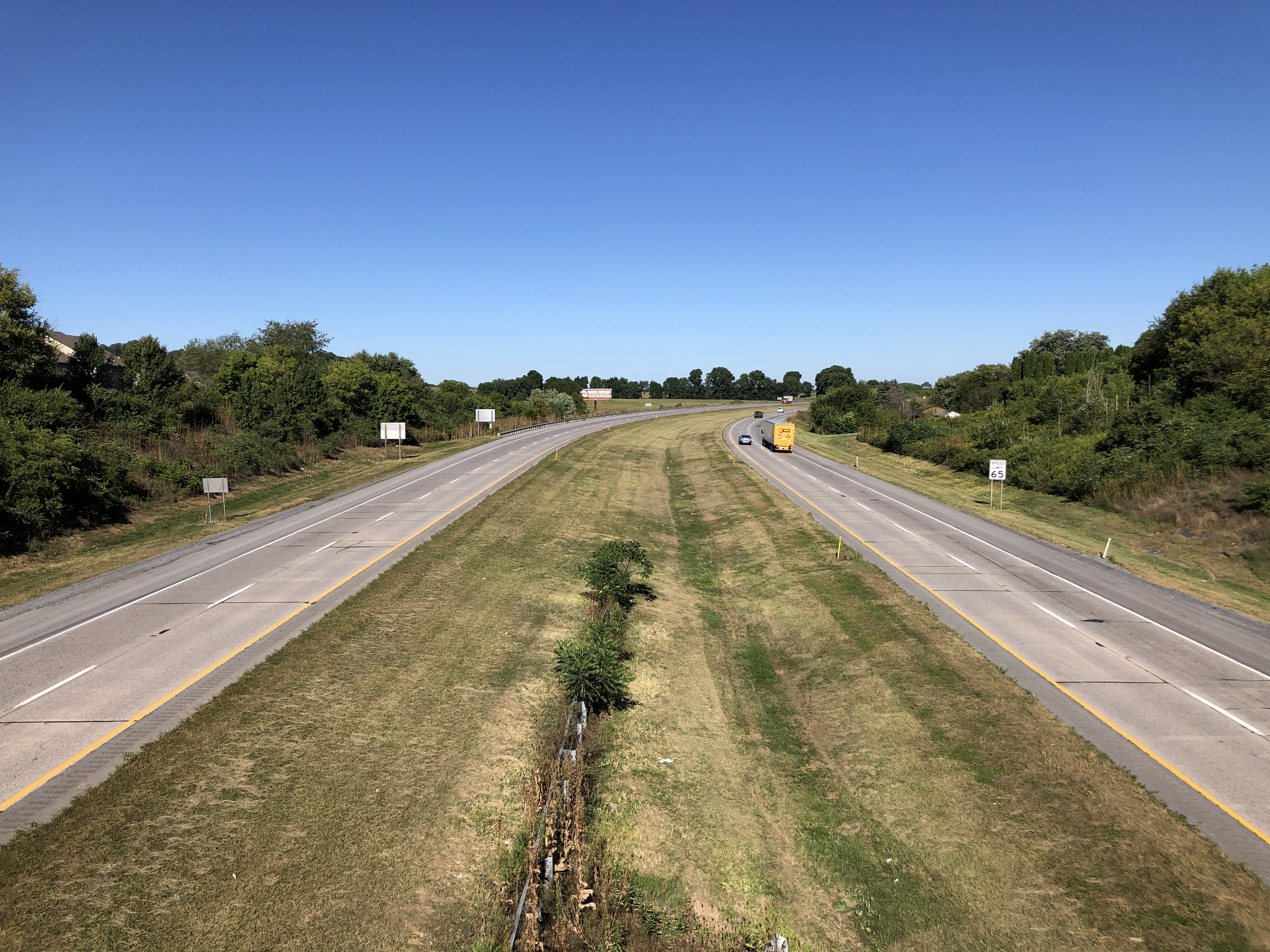
US Route 222 northbound in Kutztown

As of 2007, there were 19.63 miles (31.59 km) of public roads in Kutztown, of which 3.09 miles (4.97 km) were maintained by the Pennsylvania Department of Transportation (PennDOT) and 16.54 miles (26.62 km) were maintained by the borough.

U.S. Route 222 skims the northern and western edge of the borough on a freeway called the Kutztown Bypass, heading northeast to Allentown and southwest to Reading. Pennsylvania Route 737 heads north on Krumsville Road to Krumsville and Interstate 78/U.S. Route 22. Main Street runs southwest–northeast through Kutztown, becoming Kutztown Road outside the borough and connecting to US 222 at both ends. Greenwich Street heads north from Main Street and becomes PA 737 past an interchange with US 222. Noble Street heads south from Main Street toward Lyons.

The Allentown and Auburn Railroad operates a freight and tourist railroad from a station in Kutztown east to Topton; the tracks are owned by the Kutztown Transportation Authority. Kutztown University of Pennsylvania has a zero-fare shuttle bus service that serves the campus and the adjacent town when school is in session, consisting of four routes operating at different times and to different locations. Klein Transportation provides bus service from a stop at Kutztown University to Douglassville, Reading, Wescosville, Hellertown, and Midtown Manhattan in New York City. Kutztown-based Bieber Transportation Group formerly provided bus service from the Bieber Bus Terminal in Kutztown to Reading, Allentown, Bethlehem, Philadelphia, and Midtown Manhattan in New York City. Bieber ended bus service on February 8, 2019. Kutztown Airport was located outside the borough but closed on January 31, 2009.

=== Utilities ===
The Borough of Kutztown Electric Department provides electricity to most of the borough, with portions of the borough receiving electricity from Met-Ed, a subsidiary of FirstEnergy. The borough's electric department dates back to the early 1900s and is one of 35 municipal electric departments in Pennsylvania. The borough purchases its electric power from American Municipal Power. The borough of Kutztown provides water and sewer service through the Water Department and Wastewater Department, respectively. The Public Works department provides trash collection and recycling to the borough. The borough also provides cable, internet, and telephone service through Home Net, a division of Hometown Utilicom. Natural gas service in Kutztown is provided by UGI Utilities.

=== Health care ===
Lehigh Valley Health Network operates the Health Center at Kutztown, which offers various services such as blood testing, family medicine, speciality care, and rehabilitation services. The nearest hospitals to Kutztown are located in the Allentown and Reading areas. Emergency medical services are provided by Kutztown Area Transport Service.

== Economy ==
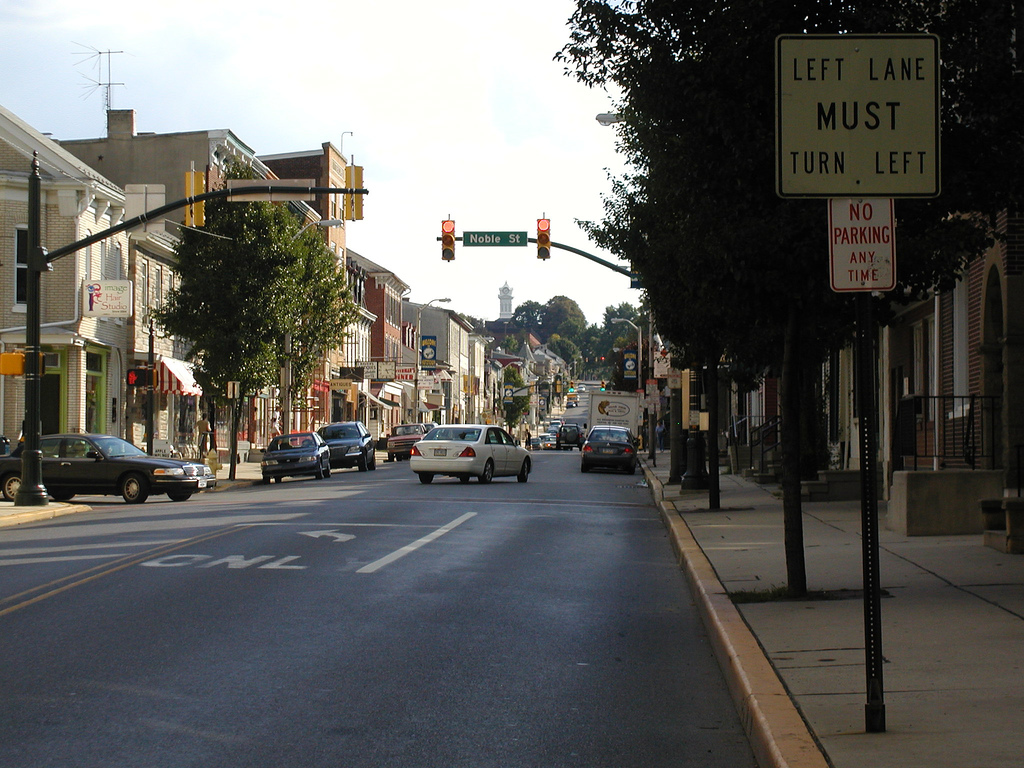
View of West Main Street from Noble Street

Kutztown's economy is strong and diverse, with workers employed by Kutztown University of Pennsylvania, and others. Companies formerly based in Kutztown include Bieber Transportation Group and the athletic shoe company Saucony.

== Notable people ==
- Luther Adler (1903-1984), actor, died in Kutztown
- Joseph A. Baer (1878-1958), Brigadier general
- Keith Haring (1958-1990), artist, born in Kutztown; his ashes are scattered nearby and a historical marker in his memory was dedicated by the Kutztown Area Historical Society on October 11, 2024
- Ranger Bill Miller (1878-1939), silent Western film actor, born in Kutztown
- Ray O'Connell (b 1949), former mayor of Allentown, Pennsylvania
- G Rene Ryan (b 1995), national champion swimmer
- Gary Mark Smith (b 1956), artist and author, grew up nearby

== Sister city ==
Kutztown has one sister city:

- Altrip, Rhineland-Palatine, Germany
