= H. K. Deisher Knitting Mill =

Historic place in Pennsylvania, United States

- U.S. National Register of Historic Places
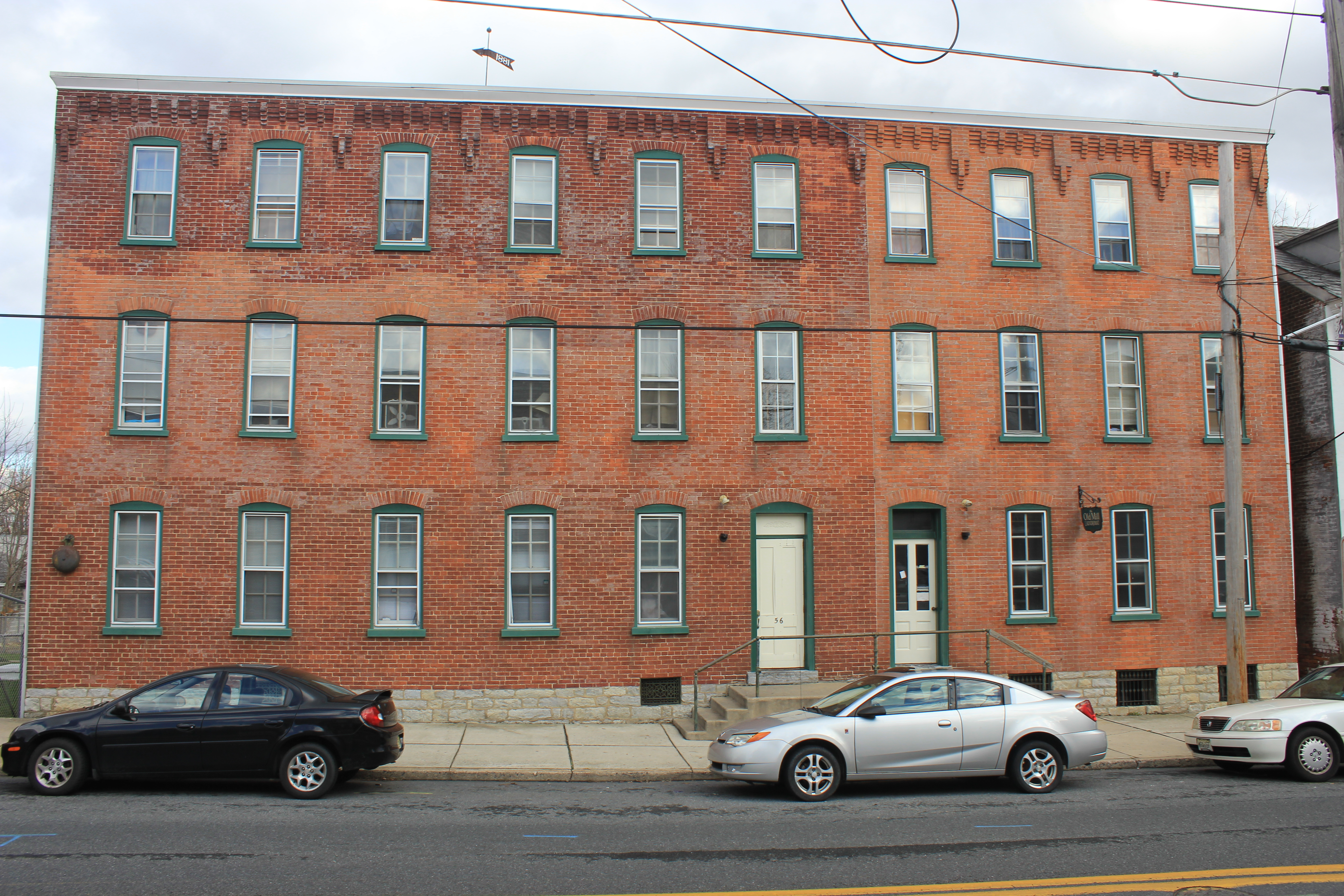
- H. K. Deisher Knitting Mill, December 2012

- Location within Pennsylvania Location within the United States
- Location: 56 Noble St., Kutztown, Pennsylvania
- Coordinates: 40°30′58″N 75°46′36″W
- Area: 0.3 acres (0.12 ha)
- Built: 1881, 1903, 1907
- Architectural style: L shape
- NRHP reference No.: 85001963
- Added to NRHP: September 5, 1985

The H. K. Deisher Knitting Mill is an historic factory building which is located in the borough of Kutztown in Berks County, Pennsylvania.

It was added to the National Register of Historic Places in 1985.

== History and architectural features ==
The original section of this historic factory was built in 1881, with the third story added in 1903 and another addition in 1907. A loading dock was added during the 1950s. It is a three-story, L-shaped red brick building which sits on a limestone foundation, and has a low-pitched gable roof topped by a weathervane. It was used as a knitting mill until 1956, after which it was used as a warehouse.
