= Kutztown Airport =

- IATA: none; ICAO: none; FAA LID: N31

Summary
- Airport type: Public
- Owner: Kutztown Enterprises
- Serves: Kutztown, Pennsylvania
- Location: Kutztown, Pennsylvania
- In use: May 1945 - January 31, 2009
- Elevation AMSL: 512 ft / 156 m
- Coordinates: 40°30′12″N 075°47′13″W

Map
- Location of airport in Pennsylvania

Runways
Direction	Length		Surface
Direction	ft	m	Surface
17/35	2,460	750	Asphalt/Turf
10/28	2,221	677	Turf

Statistics (2007)
- Aircraft operations: 44,250
- Based aircraft: 40
- Source: Federal Aviation Administration

Kutztown Airport (FAA LID: N31) is a closed, public use airport located one nautical mile (1.85 km) south of the central business district of Kutztown, a borough in Berks County, Pennsylvania, United States.

== Facilities and aircraft ==
Kutztown Airport covers an area of 90 acres (36 ha) at an elevation of 512 feet (156 m) above mean sea level. It has two runways: 17/35 is 2,460 by 240 feet (750 x 73 m) with an asphalt and turf surface; 10/28 is 2,221 by 150 feet (677 x 46 m) with a turf surface.

For the 12-month period ending April 26, 2007, the airport had 44,250 aircraft operations, an average of 121 per day: 99% general aviation, <1% military and <1% air taxi. At that time there were 40 aircraft based at this airport: 62.5% single-engine, 10% glider and 27.5% ultralight.

== Closure ==
In a letter sent by airport owners Nicholas Prikis and Sophie Pittas on October 6, it was announced that the airport would close all operation on January 31, 2009.
