= Trans-Bridge Lines =

American bus company

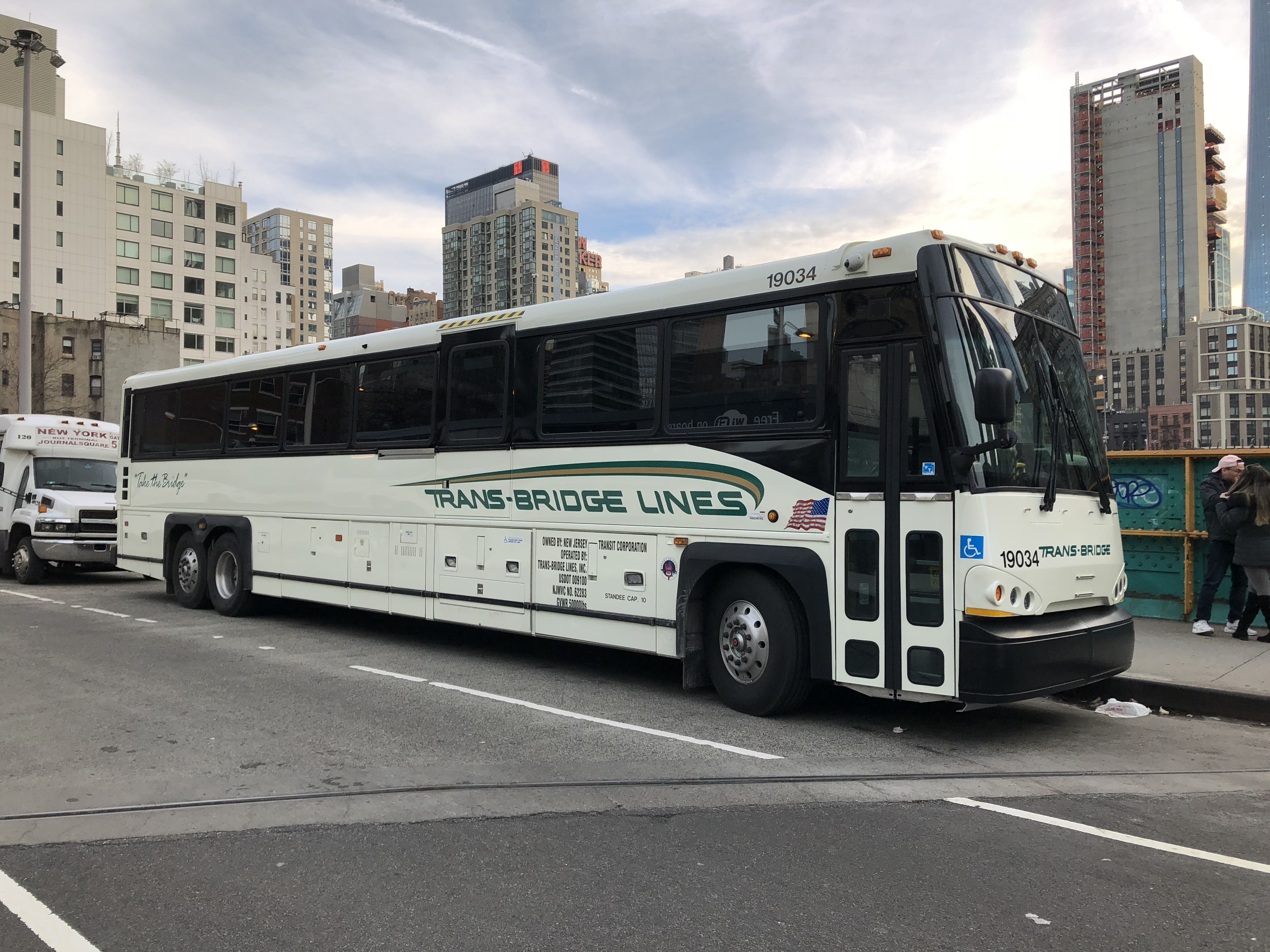
- A Trans-Bridge Lines bus on 39th Street in New York City
- Parent: Trans-Bridge Lines
- Founded: 1941
- Headquarters: 2012 Industrial Drive; Bethlehem, Pennsylvania, U.S.
- Locale: Lehigh Valley
- Service area: Lehigh Valley, Pennsylvania; Skylands Region, New Jersey, U.S.
- Service type: Line-run, contract, charter
- Alliance: International Motor Coach Group
- Routes: 3 directly controlled 2 under contract
- Fleet: 58 (route service); 72 (total)
- Daily ridership: 3,688 (weekday)
- Operator: Trans-Bridge Lines
- Chief executive: Thomas JeBran
- Website: transbridgelines.com

Trans-Bridge Lines is an interstate bus transportation company operating based in Bethlehem, Pennsylvania. It operates in New York, New Jersey, and Pennsylvania and offers daily service from the Lehigh Valley to both New York City and Philadelphia.

== Services ==
Trans-Bridge Lines offers daily service to New York City, Newark airport from the Lehigh Valley area, Doylestown, New Hope, Pennsylvania and Clinton, Phillipsburg, Frenchtown, Lambertville, Flemington and Branchburg, New Jersey. Weekday service is available to Lower Manhattan, Wall Street, and Jersey City from the Lehigh Valley and Clinton.

Trans-Bridge Lines also offers daily service to Manhattan Cruise Terminal. Charter service is available throughout the U.S. and Canada.

An affiliate company, Trans-Bridge Tours, Inc., conducts retail tours through the United States and Canada. The tours include One-Day motorcoach excursions to Atlantic City and Pennsylvania casinos, sporting events, Broadway shows, festivals and more as well as Multi-Day overnight trips to many destinations. Vacation airline and cruise packages are also offered. Trans-Bridge Tours operates branch offices in Allentown and Bethlehem, Pennsylvania and is also an agent for Trans-Bridge Lines, selling tickets for the regular route service.

=== Routes ===
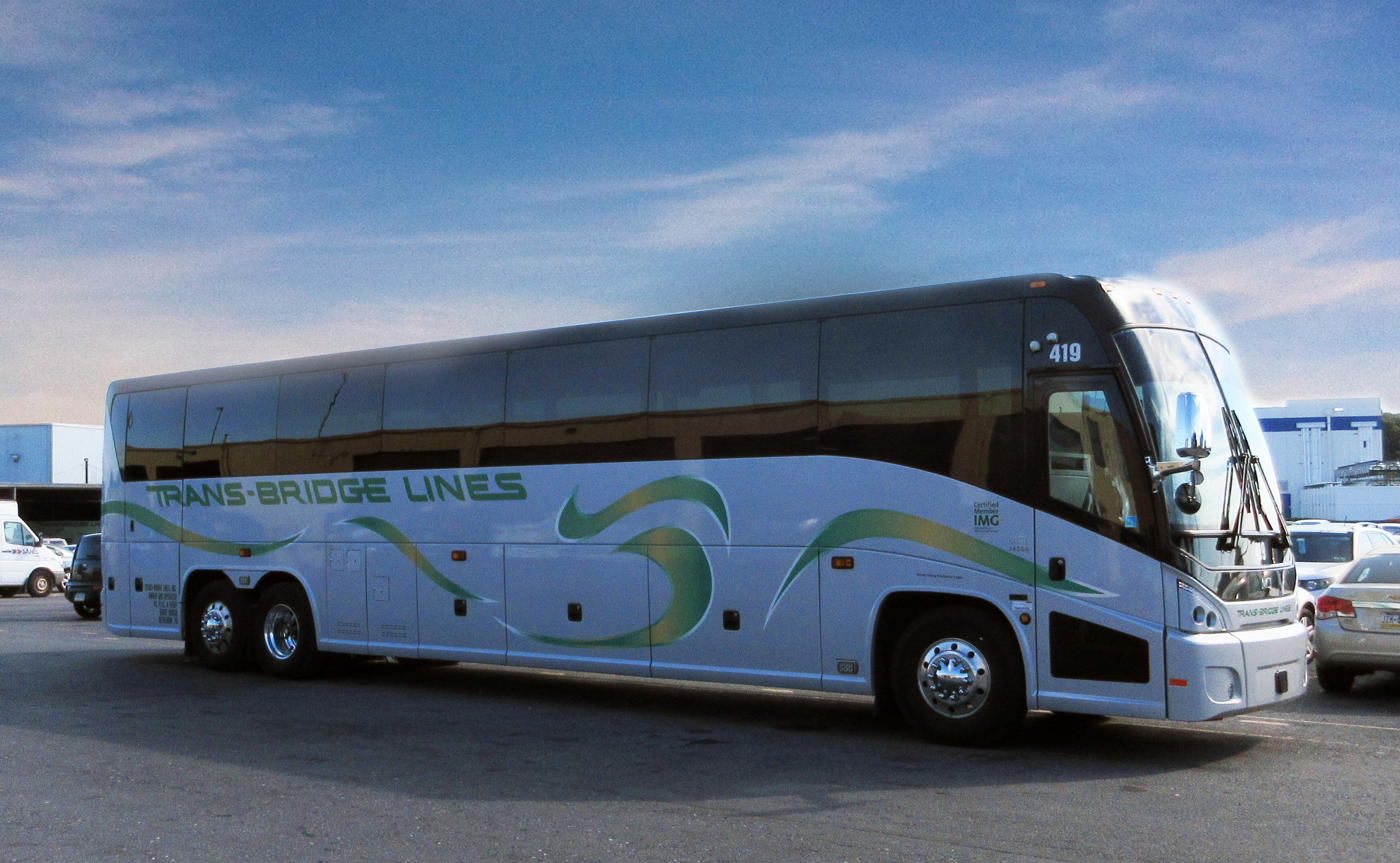
A Trans-Bridge Lines bus in October 2016

Route	Terminal A	Terminal B
Via I-78, US 22, PA 33, I-78, and PA 412	Port Authority Bus Terminal (full-time); Lower Manhattan-Wall St. (rush hours only)	Allentown (full route)
Via I-78, US 202, NJ 12, NJ 29, US 202, PA 313	Port Authority Bus Terminal	Quakertown via Doylestown train station
Via I-78 express	Port Authority Bus Terminal	Wind Creek Bethlehem
Via I-78 and US 222	Port Authority Bus Terminal	Wescosville

Connections are also available on certain Trans-Bridge schedules to Kennedy Airport, with service running to and from Terminal 5 twice daily as well as Newark Airport.

Under contract to NJ Transit, Trans-Bridge Lines operates the 890 and 891 lines running between Pohatcong and Easton, with connections available to LANta routes in Downtown Easton at Center Square, and Trans-Bridge's line run via Route 22.
