= Gary Mark Smith =

American street photographer (born 1956)

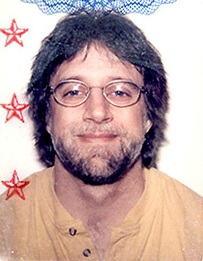
- Born: April 27, 1956 (age 70); Bethlehem, Pennsylvania, U.S.
- Known for: Street photography
- Website: streetphoto.com

Gary Mark Smith (born April 27, 1956) is an American street photographer. His work, a lifetime art project conducted in numerous countries, focuses on urban environments. His photography has been described as incorporating elements of photojournalism and fine art, often depicting violent circumstances and locations affected by social and environmentally impactful challenges.

== Early life and education ==
Smith was born in Bethlehem, Pennsylvania, on April 27, 1956. His first photographs were taken while growing up on his family farm outside Kutztown, Pennsylvania. In high school, he began photographing street life in Washington Square in nearby New York City.

In 1984, he earned a Bachelor of Science degree in journalism from the University of Kansas in Lawrence. In 1996, he earned a Master of Arts degree, the product of a full teaching fellowship provided by Purdue University in West Lafayette, Indiana.

== Career ==
Smith launched his career in Autumn 1978 and made street photography, blurring the line between journalism and fine art. His projects included:

Cold War

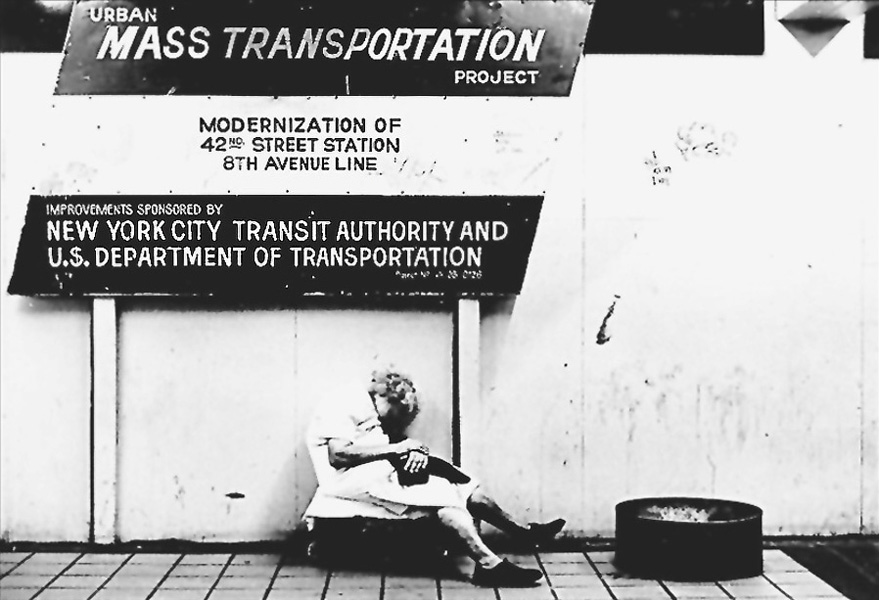
Waiting for Improvements, 3:30 a.m. New York City's Subway system, 1987

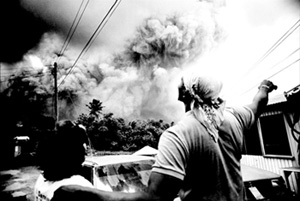
Eruption of the Sufriere Hills volcano on the Caribbean island of Montserrat, 1997

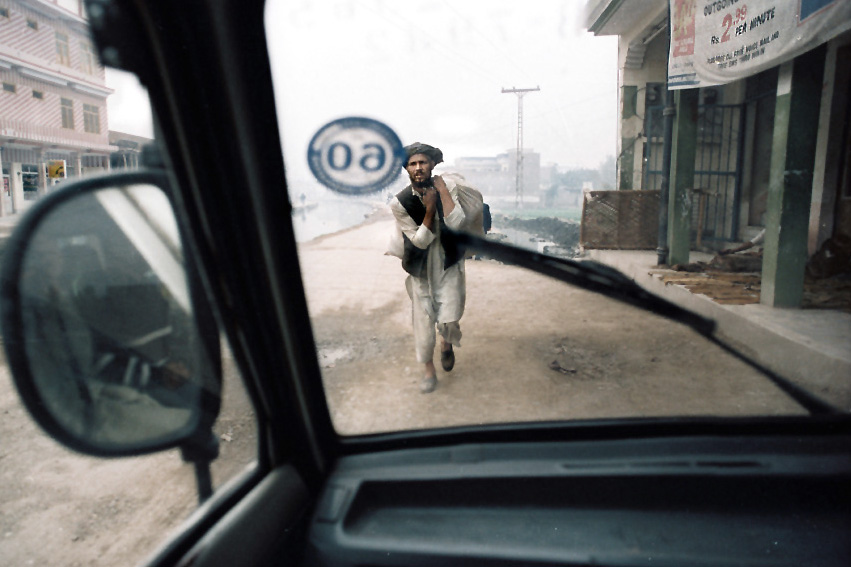
Only known photograph of a Taliban confederate escaping U.S. bombers adjacent to Tora Bora, 2001

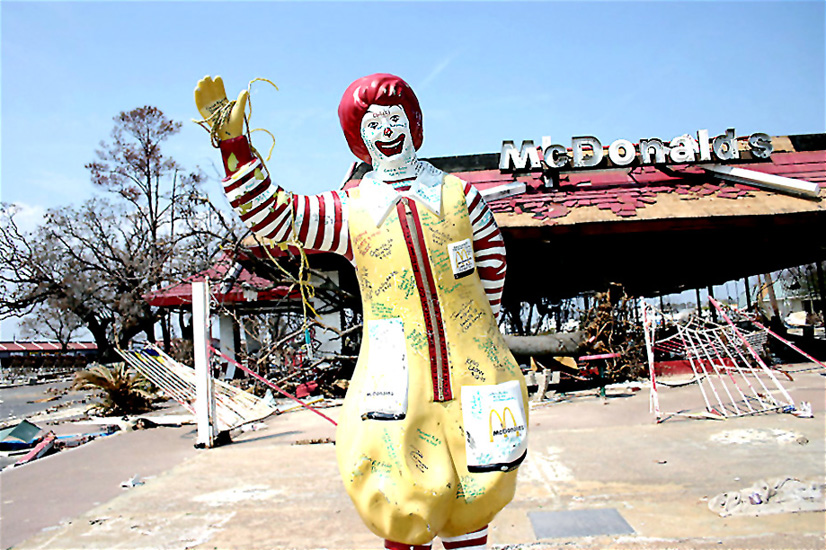
Hurricane Katrina storm surge damage along Interstate 90 on the Mississippi Gulf Coast, September 2005

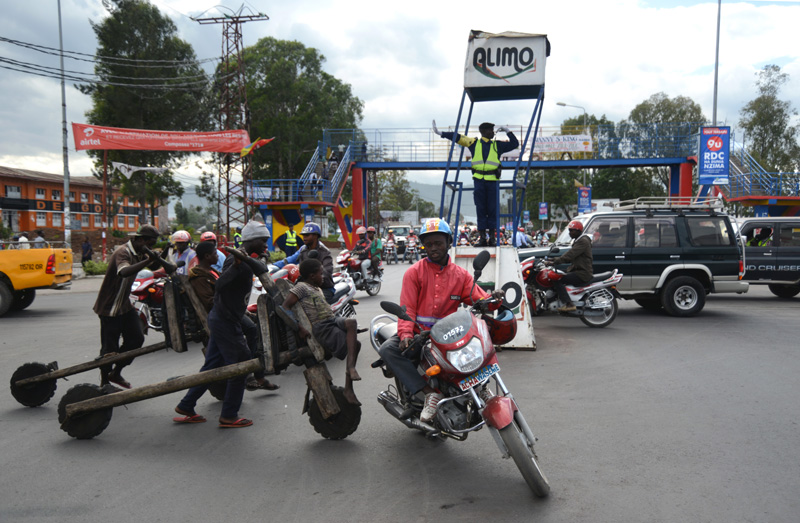
Goma, DRC, Boulevard Kanyamahanga traffic circle with crossing Chukadus, 2015

From 1982 to 1984, he made several expeditions to Central America, covering the guerilla wars in El Salvador, Guatemala, and Nicaragua while moonlighting as a journalist for the University Daily Kansan and selling combat photography as a freelancer to the Associated Press, United Press International and other agencies.

In 1990, he photographed the crumbling Iron Curtain including West Germany, East Germany, Poland, Czechoslovakia, Yugoslavia, Hungary, Greece, Italy, Switzerland, France, Belgium, and the Netherlands leading up to European and German Reunification, including celebrations in Prague, Budapest and on October 3, 1990 in Köln (Cologne), Germany.

In 1991, he photographed the streets of the collapse of the Soviet Union, as it dissolved.

"Molten Memoirs" In September 1997, Smith gained access to the death zone of Salem, Montserrat in the Lesser Antilles in the Caribbean, becoming one of the 200 volcano holdouts there who refused to leave until a near-fatal close call eruption of the Soufriere Hills Volcano on September 22, 1997 finally forced them to flee. In February 1999 Smith released his first street photography book, a journal (Molten Memoirs: Essays, Rumors Field Notes and Photographs from the Edge of Fury) about his experience.

In July 2009, a portfolio of 45 photographs from Holdout Streets of the Montserrat Volcano Disaster was accessioned into the permanent collection of the Montserrat National Trust.

Tora Bora: An American Global Street Photographer's Post 9-11 View of the Streets of the Afghanistan/Pakistan Tribal Belt at the Time of Tora Bora. Smith's Streets of the Post-9/11 World project including work from Ground Zero in New York City, the streets under the air war adjacent to the Battle of Tora Bora, the streets of the Afghanistan/Pakistan border refugee camps, the streets of the Federally Administered Tribal Areas (FATA) in Pakistan at Peshawar beyond the Khyber Pass (Mohmand and Khyber Agencies), and to the everyday post-September 11 attacks terror war streets of Las Vegas, Paris, and Lawrence, Kansas, his hometown and the only city in North America (Bleeding Kansas) established during a terror war (John Brown; William Quantrill), resulted in his third street photography book White With Foam: Essays, Rumors, Field Notes and Photographs from the Edge of World War III, published in 2009 as a Kindle Edition.

The Aftermath of Hurricane Katrina and the Flood of New Orleans On September 1, 2005, Smith was sent by the American Red Cross to the aftermath of Hurricane Katrina and the flood of New Orleans, becoming a member of the Red Cross first strike team, helping run undermanned rescue shelters in southern Louisiana on the outskirts of the Flood of New Orleans. During his service he photographed the Flood of New Orleans while on a cat rescue mission afloat down Canal Street and in addition photographed the extreme hurricane surge damage of nearly the entire Mississippi Gulf Coast Highway 90. In 2009, eight of the images were accessed into the permanent art collection at the New Orleans Museum of Art (NOMA).

Sleeping in the City: Global Street Photography from Inside the Wire. Smith has photographed in more than 100 countries on six continents. His photographs (thematic and typically of the fashion, advertising, and particular place-defining urban elements of a location along with passing people) have been accessed into museum collections in North America, South America, and Europe.

Rocinha favela, Rio de Janeiro, Brazil

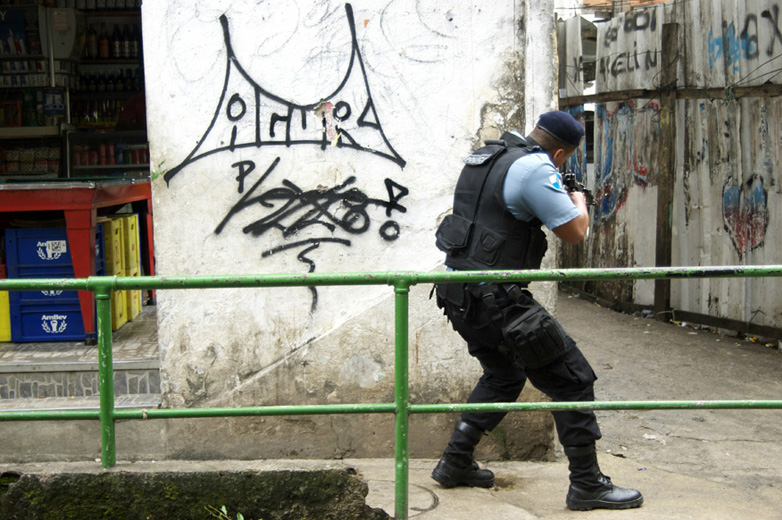
Urban Combat: Heavily armed police sharpshooter hunting armed gangsters inside Rocinha favela, Rio de Janeiro, 2012

Between 2011 and 2014, Smith and partner Sarah Stern photographed the streets of the gang-controlled Favela Rocinha in Rio de Janeiro before the city's pacification of the favela. Smith went on to publish a book about the project called Favela da Rocinha, Brazil. He then continued photographing Rocinha alone as opposing gangs (post World Cup) commenced gang warfare to retake control of most of the slum.

Goma, Congo In 2015, Smith embedded himself for 17 days inside the United Nations peacekeeping mission in North Kivu, the Democratic Republic of the Congo. Photographed life on the streets of Goma, capital city of the ongoing Congo Wars; also photographing life in the Mugunga refugee camp on the flanks of Mount Nyiragongo volcano.

== Personal life ==
Smith had a difficult upbringing that ended badly, ultimately shaping resilience as a major theme in his artwork. His mother committed suicide, a victim of uncontrollable depression, when he was in the fifth grade, resulting in his development as a self-reliant and independent spirit unencumbered by self-doubt. He was knocked unconscious in secondary lightning strikes twice, once when he was 15 and again at 20, resulting in later incorporation of the fury of nature into his global street photography method.

In 1976, Smith was abruptly disabled during a knee operation when insufficient room for swelling was left in the cast that was applied and his nerves were crushed from three inches above the knee all the way down through his left foot, a condition known as Acute Compression Syndrome. This rendered him in agonizing pain and existing under the influence of powerful opioid painkillers for the rest of his life, so he began planning to end it in time.

However, in 1978, while hitchhiking across the United States only months before his planned suicide, Smith picked up a newspaper one morning at a truck stop outside Scottsbluff, Nebraska and was inspired by an article he read promising cheaper international airfares under the new Airline Deregulation Act. That development, when blended with an inexplicable wanderlust, compelled him to become an experimental fine art global street photographer instead of killing himself or suffering the other less exciting (more painful and less pain distracting) options left available to him.

== Publications ==
=== Publications by Smith ===
- Gary Mark Smith. Molten Memoirs: Essays, Rumors, Field Notes and Photographs from the Edge of Fury. 1999, 2000, 2001, 2009. An Artist's Account of the Volcano Holdouts of Salem, Montserrat. Issued on tape for the sight impaired in 2001 by Audio Reader; 2009 issued as a Kindle Edition. OCLC 51717655
- Gary Mark Smith. Searching for Washington Square. Vol. 1, A celebration of life on the global street. Lawrence, KS: East Village PhotoArts, 2001. ISBN 9780967276946.
- Gary Mark Smith. White with Foam: Essays, Rumors, Field Notes, and Photographs from the Edge of World War III. 2003. 3rd edition. Kindle, 2009.
- Gary Mark Smith. Goma: The Poetry of Everyday Life on the Streets of the Most Miserable Place on Earth; Inside the United Nations Peacekeeping Mission in North Kivu, the Democratic Republic of the Congo. 2016. ISBN 9780967276984.
- Gary Mark Smith. Travelogueing The Dark Side: The ExtremeOphile Field Notes of A One-of-A-Kind Lifetime Art Project documenting and completing Smith’s 40-year-long History in Time – Danger Street project two decades before and two decades after the millennium. East Village PhotoArts; 2018. ISBN 9 780967 276991.

=== Publications with others ===
- Janet M. Cinelli. The Road to Hell: How to Make Heaven Out of Third Class Travel. Lawrence, KS: East Village TravelArts, 2009. With a foreword and photography by Gary Mark Smith. ISBN 9780967276960
- Sarah Stern and Gary Mark Smith, with Carlos the Filmmaker. Favela da Rocinha, Brazil. Lawrence, KS: East Village PhotoArts; Collierville, TN. 2012. ISBN 9780967276977.
- Cover Photograph - Arundhati Roy. The God of Small Things (Italian Translation). 2003. ISBN 88-8246-633-7.

== Exhibitions ==
- 2006: Four of Smith's images (from Greece, Amsterdam, Montserrat and Las Vegas) were selected by photography critic Mason Resnick for inclusion in the four-month international street photography Crosswalks Exhibition at the Oklahoma City Museum of Art (OKCMOA). Later, after the exhibition closed, the museum accessioned two of Smith's digital street photographs (from Las Vegas and Amsterdam) into its permanent art collection.
- 2006: Two photographs from the Streets of the Aftermath of Hurricane Katrina series became part of the Katrina Exposed Exhibition (June–September) at the New Orleans Museum of Art (NOMA): Devastatingly Beautiful and Ronald McDonald Mississippi Surge-Scape.
- 2010: Photographs included in the George Eastman House International Museum of Photography and Film History of Photography celebration at Sotheby's (New York) titled "History of Photography," which featured a selection of 225 "celebrated" photographers.
- The Stern/Smith book about the adventure (Favela da Rocinha, Brazil), along with 20 of their photographic prints from the book were inducted into the Joan Flasch Artists Book Collection at the School of the Art Institute of Chicago.
- 2006 - 2021: Multiple exhibitions at the Oklahoma City Museum of Art, including Crosswalks Street Photography group exhibit with Garry Winogrand and Photographing the Street group exhibit in 2006 and 2018, respectively. The Oklahoma City Museum of Art presented the exhibition Shared Lives, Distant Places, a one-artist exhibition featuring 38 of Smith's works curated by Jessica Provencher. The exhibition included material from his long-term project History in Time - Danger Streets.
- 2026: The City of Lawrence selected Smith as one of six artists to contribute to the yearly Unmistakable Public Art Exhibition.

== Awards and recognition ==
- 1991: One of four winners of American Photo magazine Photographers Career Competition for his work during the El Salvador Civil war.
- 2000: A winner of the American Photo International Reader's Competition, for his work in Montserrat.
- 2000: Mason Resnick at Black & White Online magazine (New York) named Smith's website streetphoto.com as one of the "Top Ten Black & White Photo Web Sites" Online.
- In 2012, two photographs from Smith's Rocinha project were nominated for the International Masters Cup Color Award. In 2016, two photographs from his Goma series were also nominated for the same award. One of the 2016 nominated images, Five Kids Atop a Basketball Hoop in Goma, was later selected as an International Masters Cup Color Award "Photo of the Year.

== Collections ==
- 2006-2020: Oklahoma City Museum of Art collected 40 of Smith's multi-image artworks and photographs into its permanent collection and promoted them in Exhibition 2020-21.
- 2009: Eight photographs from Smith's 2007 Streets of the Aftermath of Hurricane Katrina were accepted into the permanent collection of the New Orleans Museum of Art (NOMA), as part of the hurricane memorial portfolio.
- 2009: A portfolio of 45 of Smith's 1997–1999 Holdout Streets of the Montserrat Volcano Disaster was accepted into the permanent collection of the Montserrat National Trust.
- 2011: Collection of archives, research material, negatives, prints, and personal mementos given to the Kenneth Spencer Research Library at the University of Kansas, Lawrence, Kansas created in the artist's name as part of its Kansas Collection, a collection including travel artifacts and more than 6,000 career-producing photographs.
- 2011: The Art Institute of Chicago added a portfolio of 10 of Smith's images from Rocinha favela in Rio de Janeiro from Smith and Sarah Stern's book Travelogueing the Dark side, and the book itself to its Joan Flasch artist book collection at the School of the Art Institute of Chicago.
- 2020: The Douglas County Historical Society's Watkins Museum of History accepted an exhibit of 135 of Smith's images shot and printed during the COVID-19 pandemic lock down in Lawrence, Kansas.
- 2023: The Douglas County Historical Society's Watkins Museum of History requested and accepted a print of Smith and onetime gallery mate William S. Burroughs walking the Lawrence alley past the Jazzhaus.
