= Wescosville, Pennsylvania =

Unincorporated community in Pennsylvania, US

- Census-designated place
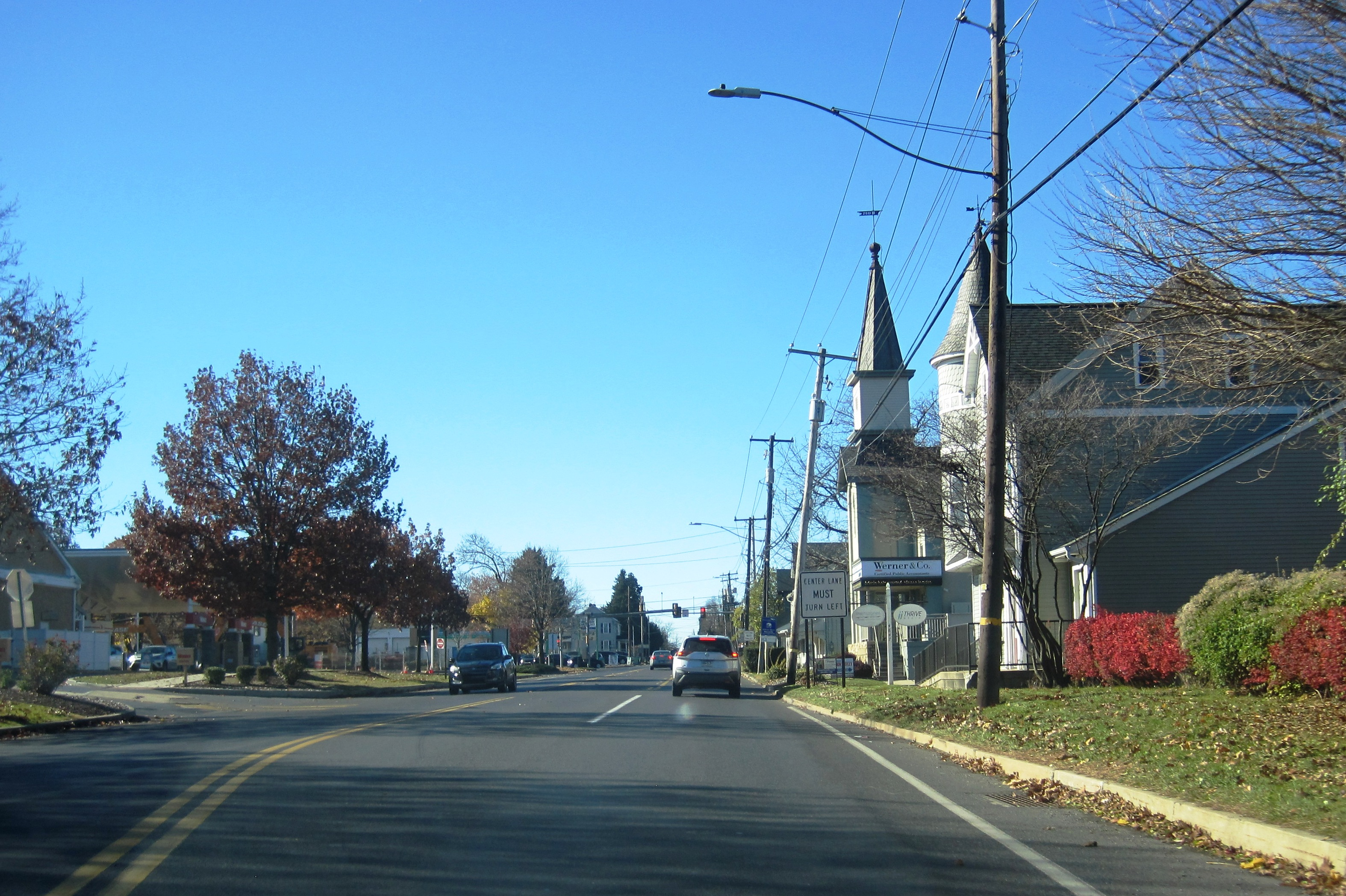
- Center of Wescosville along Hamilton Boulevard

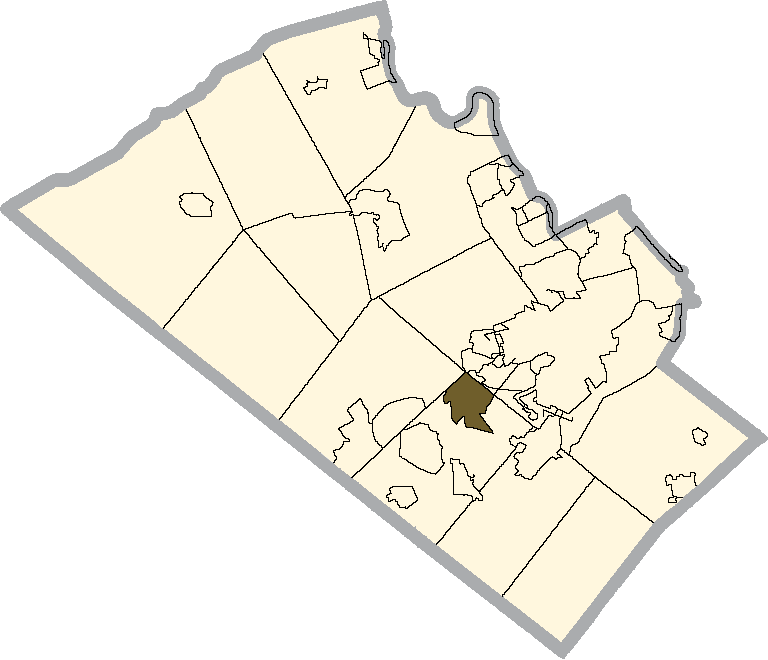
- Location of Wescosville in Lehigh County, Pennsylvania

- Location of Wescosville in Pennsylvania Location in the United States
- Coordinates: 40°34′00″N 75°33′11″W
- Country: United States
- State: Pennsylvania
- County: Lehigh
- Township: Lower Macungie

Area
  - Census-designated place: 2.72 sq mi (7.05 km^{2})
  - Land: 2.72 sq mi (7.04 km^{2})
  - Water: 0.0039 sq mi (0.01 km^{2})
- Elevation: 412 ft (126 m)

Population (2010)
  - Census-designated place: 5,872
  - Density: 2,160/sq mi (834/km^{2})
  - Metro: 865,310 (US: 68th)
- Time zone: UTC-5 (Eastern (EST))
  - Summer (DST): UTC-4 (EDT)
- ZIP Codes: 18103, 18104, 18106
- Area codes: 610 and 484
- FIPS code: 42-82320
- GNIS feature ID: 1190850
- Primary airport: Lehigh Valley International Airport
- Major hospital: Lehigh Valley Hospital–Cedar Crest
- School district: East Penn

Wescosville is a census-designated place located in Lehigh County, Pennsylvania. It is located between Allentown and Trexlertown in Lower Macungie Township. It is part of the Lehigh Valley, which had a population of 861,899 and was the 68th-most populous metropolitan area in the U.S. as of the 2020 census.

As of the 2010 census, the population of Wescosville was 5,872. Its ZIP Codes are split between the Allentown codes of 18103, 18104, and 18106.

== History ==
Wescosville was named after Philip Wesco, who operated a local inn in the 1820s.

== Geography ==
Wescosville is located in south-central Lehigh County in the northern corner of Lower Macungie Township. It has a total area of 2.7 square miles (7.1 km^{2}) of which 0.004 square miles (0.01 km^{2}), or 0.15%, is water, according to the U.S. Census Bureau. The community drains south toward Little Lehigh Creek and north toward Cedar Creek, a tributary of the Little Lehigh. Wescosville is part of the Lehigh River watershed.

== Transportation ==
The primary business district of Wescosville runs along Hamilton Boulevard and is bisected by the Pennsylvania Turnpike Northeast Extension (I-476). Interstate 78 runs along the northeastern edge of Wescosville, interchanging with U.S. 222. I-78 East proceeds 92 miles (148 km) to the Holland Tunnel's entrance to Lower Manhattan. I-78 West via Interstate 81 proceeds 78 miles (126 km) to Harrisburg. US-222 leads southeast from Wescosville for 34 miles (55 km) to Reading. Hamilton Boulevard continues northeast 5 miles (8 km) to Allentown.

Wescosville is home to a park and ride lot at the site of the former Charcoal Drive-In restaurant on Hamilton Boulevard that serves Trans-Bridge Lines and Klein Transportation buses to Midtown Manhattan in New York City.

Historical population
Census	Pop.	Note	%±
2000	4,965		—
2010	5,872		18.3%

== Public education ==
Wescosville is part of the East Penn School District. Students in grades nine through 12 attend Emmaus High School in Emmaus. Students in grades six through eight attend either Eyer Middle School or Lower Macungie Middle School, both located in Macungie. Students in kindergarten to fifth grade attend either Wescosville Elementary School in Wescosville or Willow Lane Elementary School in Macungie.

== Notable people ==
- Anna Kunkel, former outfielder, South Bend Blue Sox of the All-American Girls Professional Baseball League
- Christine Taylor, actress and wife of Ben Stiller
