= HNHS =

HNHS may refer to:

- Havelock North High School, Havelock North, New Zealand
- Holy Name High School, Parma Heights, Ohio, United States
- Holy Name High School (Reading, Pennsylvania), United States
- Holy Names High School (Oakland, California), United States
- Holy Names High School (Windsor, Ontario), Canada
- Huntington North High School, Huntington County, Indiana, United States
