= Max Hurleman =

American football player (born 2001)

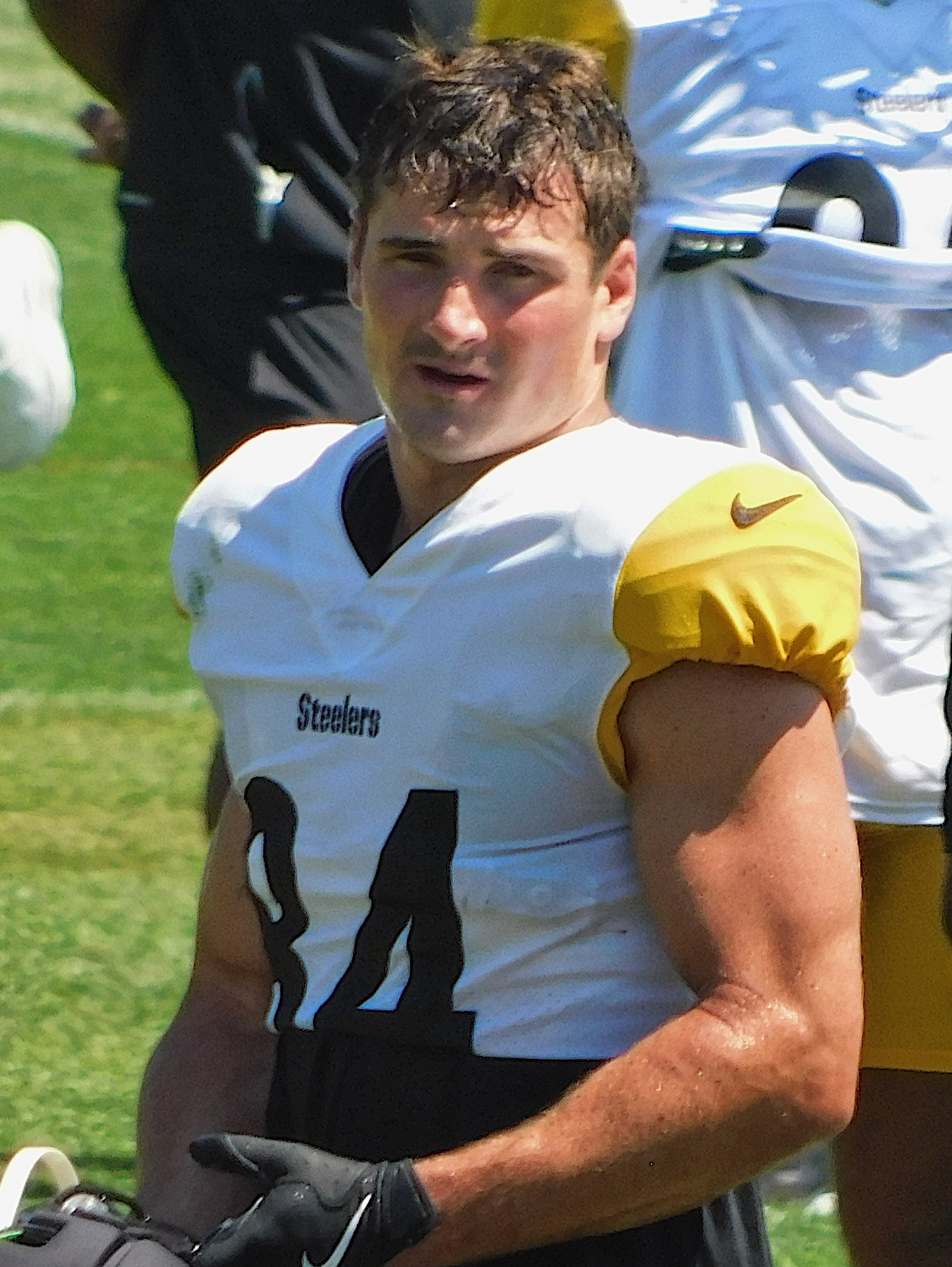
- Hurleman with the Pittsburgh Steelers in 2026

No. 84 – Pittsburgh Steelers
- Position: Wide Receiver
- Roster status: Active

Personal information
- Born: October 19, 2001 (age 25); Wyomissing, Pennsylvania, U.S.
- Listed height: 5 ft 11 in (1.80 m)
- Listed weight: 200 lb (91 kg)

Career information
- High school: Wyomissing
- College: Colgate (2020–2023); Notre Dame (2024)
- NFL draft: 2025: undrafted

Career history
- Pittsburgh Steelers (2025–present)

Awards and highlights
- First-team All-Patriot (2023)
- Stats at Pro Football Reference

Maxwell Jason Hurleman (born October 19, 2001) is an American professional football wide receiver for the Pittsburgh Steelers of the National Football League (NFL). He played college football for the Colgate Raiders and Notre Dame Fighting Irish.

== Early life ==
Hurleman attended high school at Wyomissing Area Junior/Senior High School in Wyomissing, Pennsylvania where he played running back and defensive back. Coming out of high school, he was a 1,000 yard-rusher, where he committed to play college football for the Colgate Raiders.

== College career ==
=== Colgate ===
During his four-year career at Colgate from 2020 through 2023, he rushed for 814 yards and one touchdown, while adding 80 receptions for 841 yards, three touchdowns, recording 18 kickoff returns for a total of 308 yards and 14 punt returns for 138 yards, where for his performance he was named to the 2023 All-Patriot League First Team as a special teamer. After the conclusion of the 2023 season, Hurleman decided to enter his name into the NCAA transfer portal.

=== Notre Dame ===
Hurleman transferred to play for the Notre Dame Fighting Irish as a walk-on cornerback. In his one season at Notre Dame in 2024, he served as the team's punt returner, returning 23 punts for 138 yards, while notching 13 tackles and a fumble recovery on special teams.

=== Statistics ===
Year	Team	GP	Rushing				Receiving				Tackles			Fumbles	
Year	Team	GP	Att	Yds	Avg	TD	Rec	Yds	Avg	TD	Total	Solo	Ast	FF	FR
2020–21	Colgate	2	12	46	3.8	0	2	48	24.0	0	0	0	0	0	0
2021	Colgate	11	92	346	3.8	1	30	281	9.4	0	0	0	0	0	0
2022	Colgate	11	83	397	4.8	0	20	239	12.0	1	0	0	0	0	0
2023	Colgate	11	7	25	3.6	0	28	273	9.8	2	2	2	0	0	1
2024	Notre Dame	16	0	0	–	0	0	0	–	0	13	11	2	0	1
Career		51	194	814	4.2	1	80	841	10.5	3	15	13	2	0	2

== Professional career ==
Pre-draft measurables
Height	Weight	Arm length	Hand span	Wingspan	40-yard dash	10-yard split	20-yard split	20-yard shuttle	Three-cone drill	Vertical jump	Broad jump	Bench press
5 ft 10 7/8 in (1.80 m)	200 lb (91 kg)	30 1/8 in (0.77 m)	9 1/8 in (0.23 m)	6 ft 1 1/4 in (1.86 m)	4.65 s	1.70 s	2.71 s	4.22 s	6.96 s	36.0 in (0.91 m)	9 ft 11 in (3.02 m)	13 reps
All values from Pro Day

After not being selected in the 2025 NFL draft, Hurleman signed with the Pittsburgh Steelers as an undrafted free agent wide receiver. Heading into the 2025 season, he was one of the team's top UDFA's as he competed for a 53-man roster spot. In his NFL debut in week one of the 2025 NFL preseason, he hauled in two passes for 29 yards and a touchdown in a win over Jacksonville. He was waived on August 25, and re-signed to the practice squad. On January 14, 2026, he signed a reserve/futures contract and transitioned back into a running back.

On August 30, 2026, Hurleman was waived by the Steelers as a part of final roster cuts; he was re-signed to the team's practice squad the following day.

Hurleman was called up to Pittsburgh's active roster on November 22 for their game against the Philadelphia Eagles. He scored his first touchdown late in the fourth quarter and five receptions overall.
