= Ross Tucker =

American football player and sports broadcaster (born 1979)

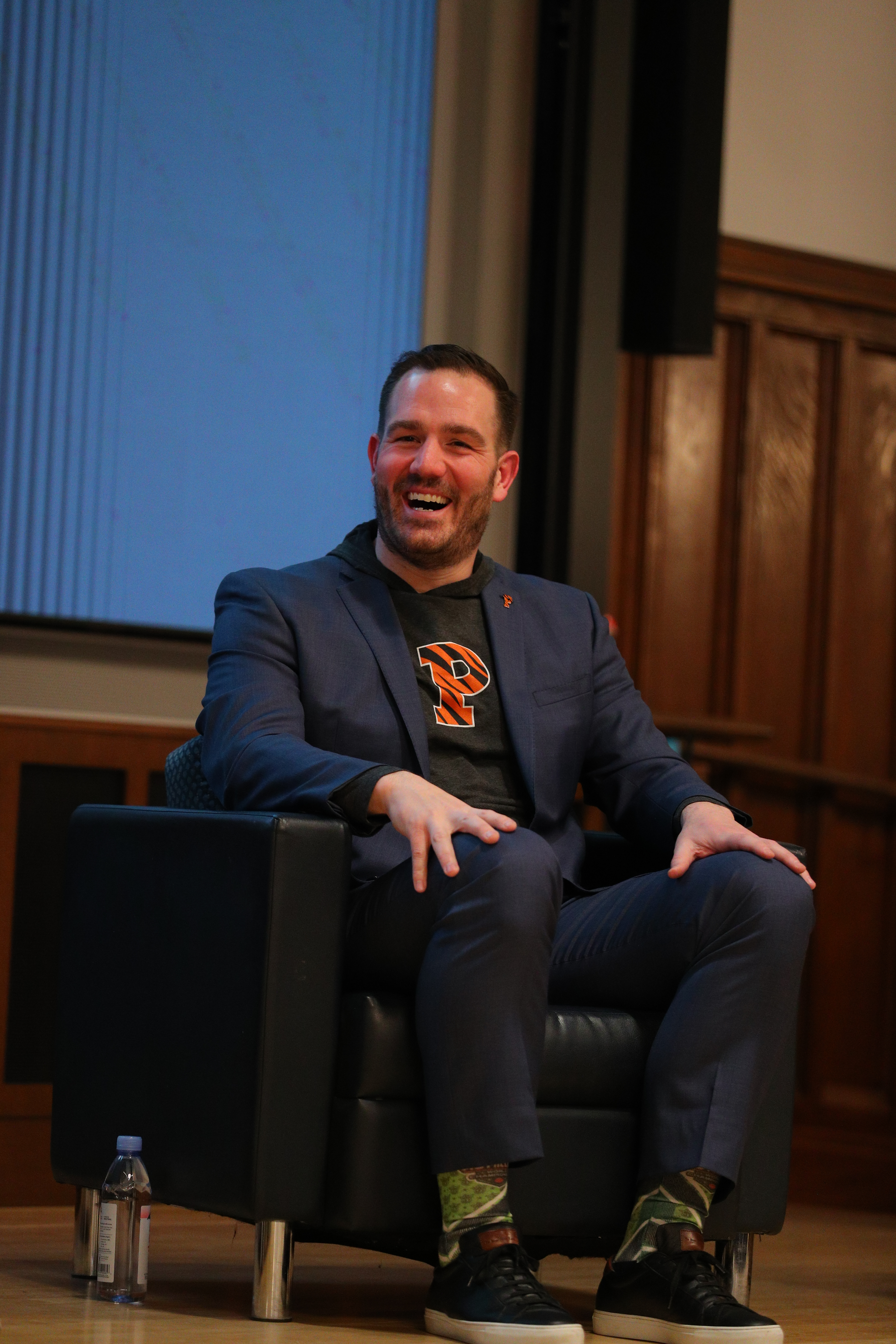

No. 68, 69, 65
- Position: Guard

Personal information
- Born: March 2, 1979 (age 47); Wyomissing, Pennsylvania, U.S.
- Listed height: 6 ft 4 in (1.93 m)
- Listed weight: 250 lb (113 kg)

Career information
- High school: Wyomissing Area (Wyomissing, Pennsylvania)
- College: Princeton (1997–2000)
- NFL draft: 2001: undrafted

Career history
- Washington Redskins (2001–2002); Dallas Cowboys (2002); Buffalo Bills (2003–2004); New England Patriots (2005); Cleveland Browns (2006)*; Washington Redskins (2007)
- * Offseason or practice squad member only

Awards and highlights
- All-Ivy (2000); USA Today "All-Joe Team" (2003); Princeton 150th Anniversary All-time Team (2019)

Career NFL statistics
- Games played: 42
- Games started: 24
- Fumble recoveries: 1
- Stats at Pro Football Reference

Ross Finch Tucker (born March 2, 1979) is an American former professional football guard and sports broadcaster. Tucker was an All-Ivy League offensive lineman at Princeton University and then played seven seasons in the National Football League (NFL). Tucker retired as a player after suffering a neck injury during the 2007 season. He works for CBS Sports, the Philadelphia Eagles, Westwood One, Audacy, and hosts the Ross Tucker Football Podcast on the DraftKings Network.

== Early life ==
Tucker attended Wyomissing Area High School, where he earned three varsity letters each in football and basketball. He was All-league at both offensive tackle and defensive end while earning All-county honors at offensive tackle.

As a senior basketball player, he averaged 16.1 points and 9.8 rebounds while making 24 three-pointers. He also received the school's US Army Reserve Scholar-Athlete award.

== College career ==
Tucker attended Princeton University. He was a four-year starter on the Tigers Ivy League football squad. He started against Colgate University as a freshman at defensive end.

As a sophomore, he moved to right guard. He was named All-Ivy in 2000 and was a two-time Academic All-American selection. In 2019, he was named to the university's 150th Anniversary team.

== Professional career ==
=== Washington Redskins ===
Tucker signed with the Washington Redskins as an undrafted free agent after the 2001 NFL draft. He surprised observers by making the team, even though he suffered a broken hand and a partially torn MCL. The next year, he started 7 games at right guard. He was waived on October 22, 2002.

=== Dallas Cowboys ===
The Dallas Cowboys claimed Tucker off waivers on October 23, 2002. He started at left guard during the last 7 games of the season in place of an injured Larry Allen. On June 5, 2003, he was released after minicamp.

=== Buffalo Bills ===
Tucker was claimed off waivers by the Buffalo Bills on June 16, 2003, and appeared in 12 games, with five starts at right guard. In 2004, he started nine games at left guard and four at center. In 2003, he was named to the USA Today All-Joe team. After missing minicamps because of offseason back surgery and being limited with injuries, he was cut on September 3, 2005.

=== New England Patriots ===
Tucker signed with the New England Patriots on December 13, 2005. He played in one game and was declared inactive in three contests.

=== Cleveland Browns ===
On August 8, 2006, he was traded to the Cleveland Browns in exchange for a conditional 2007 draft choice (not exercised). On August 8, 2006, after LeCharles Bentley tore his patella tendon, Tucker was acquired from the Patriots for a conditional 7th round draft pick. He was released on September 2 after starting the final three preseason games.

=== Redskins and retirement ===
For the second time on March 8, 2007, Tucker signed with the Redskins again as a free agent. He suffered a career-ending neck injury that bruised his spinal cord during the preseason. On August 28, he was placed on the injured reserve list.

Tucker announced his retirement in March 2008. He played in 42 games in his 7-year NFL career, starting in 28 of them.

== Sports journalism ==
Tucker joined Sports Illustrated upon his retirement from football in 2008, writing an NFL column. Tucker also has previously written for The Athletic and now writes regularly for The 33rd Team. He hosted The Morning Kickoff with Ross Tucker on Sirius XM NFL Radio for over a decade and is a frequent fill-in host on The Dan Patrick Show.

Tucker is an Emmy nominated broadcaster who serves as a game analyst for both NFL and College Football games on CBS and Westwood One. In 2026, Tucker was promoted to the No. 2 broadcast booth on the NFL on CBS with Ian Eagle, replacing JJ Watt, who had been promoted to the top broadcast team on July 31 after Tony Romo was put on leave that same day and later parting ways with CBS Sports on October 2 following his arrest for operating while under the influence (OWI). Tucker is an NFL insider for Audacy, a contributor to 94.1 WIP in Philadelphia and is the Philadelphia Eagles preseason television analyst. He also hosts podcasts as part of the Ross Tucker Football Podcast network distributed via DraftKings.
