= Brandon George =

American football player (born 2000)

Profile
- Position: Linebacker

Personal information
- Born: November 19, 2000 (age 25); Reading, Pennsylvania, U.S.
- Listed height: 6 ft 3 in (1.91 m)
- Listed weight: 240 lb (109 kg)

Career information
- High school: Berks Catholic (Reading, Pennsylvania)
- College: Pittsburgh (2019–2024)
- NFL draft: 2025: undrafted

Career history
- Kansas City Chiefs (2025); Philadelphia Eagles (2026)*
- * Offseason or practice squad member only
- Stats at Pro Football Reference

Brandon George (born November 19, 2000) is an American professional football linebacker. He played college football for the Pittsburgh Panthers.

== Early life ==
George attended Berks Catholic High School in Reading, Pennsylvania, where he notched 347 tackles and rushed for 2,753 yards and 48 touchdowns. He was rated as a three-star recruit and committed to play college football for the Pittsburgh Panthers.

== College career ==
As a freshman in 2019, George racked up five tackles. In 2020, he totaled 16 tackles a blocked punt in 11 games. In 2021, George put up 34 tackles with five going for a loss, and a pass deflection. In 2022, he notched 13 tackles with two being for a loss, and a sack, in just four games due to injury, where he utilized a redshirt. In 2023, George played in all 12 games, where he recorded 49 tackles with four and a half being for a loss, and an interception. In the 2024 season opener, he tallied seven tackles and a forced fumble in a victory over Kent State. During the 2024 season, George was a full-time starter, where he notched 80 tackles with six being for a loss, two sacks, and three forced fumbles.

== Professional career ==
Pre-draft measurables
Height	Weight	Arm length	Hand span	Wingspan	40-yard dash	10-yard split	20-yard split	20-yard shuttle	Three-cone drill	Vertical jump	Broad jump	Bench press
6 ft 3 1/4 in (1.91 m)	246 lb (112 kg)	33 in (0.84 m)	9 3/4 in (0.25 m)	6 ft 8 1/8 in (2.04 m)	4.65 s	1.59 s	2.66 s	4.14 s	6.98 s	42.5 in (1.08 m)	10 ft 8 in (3.25 m)	28 reps
All values from Pro Day

=== Kansas City Chiefs ===
After not being selected in the 2025 NFL draft, George signed with the Kansas City Chiefs as an undrafted free agent. He was waived on May 5, 2026.

=== Philadelphia Eagles ===
On August 15, 2026, George signed with the Philadelphia Eagles. He was waived by the Eagles as a part of final roster cuts on August 30.
