= 1997 All-Big East Conference football team =

American college football all-star team

The 1997 All-Big East Conference football team consists of American football players chosen as All-Big East Conference players for the 1997 NCAA Division I-A football season. The organizations selecting All-Big East teams in 1997 included the conference coaches.

== Offensive selections ==
=== Quarterbacks ===
- Donovan McNabb, Syracuse (Coaches-1)
- Pete Gonzalez, Pitt (Coaches-2)

=== Running backs ===
- Edgerrin James, Miami (FL) (Coaches-1)
- Amos Zereoué, West Virginia (Coaches-1)
- Ken Oxendine, Virginia Tech (Coaches-2)
- Dwayne Schulters, Pitt (Coaches-2)

=== Wide receivers ===
- Shawn Foreman, West Virginia (Coaches-1)
- Quinton Spotwood, Syracuse (Coaches-1)
- Terry Murphy, Pitt (Coaches-2)
- Reggie Wayne, Miami (FL) (Coaches-2)

=== Tight ends ===
- Todd Pollack, Boston College (Coaches-1)
- Bubba Franks, Miami (FL) (Coaches-2)
- Roland Williams, Syracuse (Coaches-2)

=== Offensive line ===
- Solomon Page, West Virginia (Coaches-1)
- Gennaro DiNapoli, Virginia Tech (Coaches-1)
- Todd Washington, Virginia Tech (Coaches-1)
- Doug Brzezinski, Boston College (Coaches-1)
- Tony Orlandini, Pitt (Coaches-1)
- Jon Marzoch, Pitt (Coaches-2)
- Eric de Groh, West Virginia (Coaches-2)
- Damien Woody, Boston College (Coaches-2)
- Kerlin Blaise, Miami (FL) (Coaches-2)
- Brad Patkochis, Syracuse (Coaches-2)

== Defensive selections ==
=== Defensive line ===
- Kerwin Hairston, Virginia Tech (Coaches-1)
- Chris Hovan, Boston College (Coaches-1)
- Henry Slay, West Virginia (Coaches-1)
- John Thornton, West Virginia (Coaches-1)
- Larry Chester, Temple (Coaches-2)
- John Engelberger, Virginia Tech (Coaches-2)
- Frank Moore, Pitt (Coaches-2)

=== Linebackers ===
- Antwaune Ponds, Syracuse (Coaches-1)
- Gary Stills, West Virginia (Coaches-1)
- Erik Storz, Boston College (Coaches-1)
- Phil Clarke, Pitt (Coaches-2)
- John Hadley, West Virginia (Coaches-2)
- Brian Sheridan, Rutgers (Coaches-2)
- Steve Tate, Virginia Tech (Coaches-2)

=== Cornerbacks ===
- Duane Starks, Miami (FL) (Coaches-1)
- Nate Terry, West Virginia (Coaches-1)
- Rod Gadson, Syracuse (Coaches-2)
- Excel Lucas, Temple (Coaches-2)

=== Safeties ===
- Donovan Darius, Syracuse (Coaches-1)
- Pierson Prioleau, Virginia Tech (Coaches-1)
- Pedro Cinno, Boston College (Coaches-2)
- Tebucky Jones, Syracuse (Coaches-2)

== Special teams ==
=== Kickers ===
- Shayne Graham, Virginia Tech (Coaches-1)
- Jay Taylor, West Virginia (Coaches-2)

=== Punters ===
- Jimmy Kibble, Virginia Tech (Coaches-1)
- Josh Boles, Temple (Coaches-2)
- Jared Slovan, Rutgers (Coaches-2)

=== Return specialist ===
- Quinton Spotwood, Syracuse (Coaches-1)
- Kevin Johnson, Syracuse (Coaches-2)

== Key ==
Coaches, selected by the conference coaches

== See also ==
- 1997 All-America college football team
