= Pete Gonzalez =

American gridiron football player (born 1974)

No. 7, 1
- Position: Quarterback

Personal information
- Born: July 4, 1974 (age 52); Miami, Florida, U.S.
- Listed height: 6 ft 1 in (1.85 m)
- Listed weight: 216 lb (98 kg)

Career information
- High school: Coral Park (Miami)
- College: Pittsburgh (1993–1997)
- NFL draft: 1998: undrafted

Career history
- Pittsburgh Steelers (1998–1999); Indianapolis Colts (2000)*; Buffalo Bills (2001)*; Hamilton Tiger-Cats (2002–2003)
- * Offseason or practice squad member only

Awards and highlights
- Second-team All-Big East (1997)
- Stats at Pro Football Reference

Pete Gonzalez (born July 4, 1974) is an American former professional football quarterback who played for the Pittsburgh Steelers of the National Football League (NFL) and the Hamilton Tiger-Cats of the Canadian Football League (CFL). He played college football for the Pittsburgh Panthers.

== Early life ==
Pete Gonzalez was born on July 24, 1974, in Miami, Florida. He attended Miami Coral Park Senior High School in Miami.

== College career ==
Gonzalez played college football for the Pittsburgh Panthers of the University of Pittsburgh. He threw three incomplete passes for one interception as a true freshman in 1993 before taking a redshirt. He only attempted six passes in 1994, completing four of them for 53 yards while also scoring a rushing touchdown. Gonzalez made his first career start in 1995 after John Ryan was benched. Overall in 1995, Gonzalez recorded 30 completions on 76 passing attempts (39.5%) for 478 yards, three touchdowns, and five interceptions while scoring a rushing touchdown. He started two games during the 1996 season after Matt Lytle was benched. However, Lytle then returned as starter. Gonzalez completed 30 of 65 passes (46.2%) for 344 yards, three touchdowns, and three interceptions.

In 1997, Gonzalez beat Lytle out for the starting job late in training camp. In that year, he led the Panthers to a come-from-behind-victory over the West Virginia Mountaineers in the Backyard Brawl 41–38 in double overtime. (It was the first season of the current overtime rules in college football, which was designed to eliminate tied games.) He subsequently took Pitt to their first bowl game in eight years with an appearance in the Liberty Bowl. Overall in 1997, Gonzalez completed 198 of 345 passes (57.4%) for 2,657 yards, 30 touchdowns, and seven interceptions while also running for three touchdowns. His passing attempts, completions, passing yards, and passing touchdowns were all the most in the Big East that season.

== Professional career ==
Gonzalez signed with the Pittsburgh Steelers as an undrafted free agent in 1998. He spent two seasons with the Steelers, both years as the third-string quarterback, throwing just one pass that was complete for eight yards to Hines Ward. The one pass came in the 1999 season opener against the Cleveland Browns (the Browns' first game in four years), in which the Steelers won 43–0 and had put Gonzalez in late in the game after the outcome had been decided.

After the Steelers chose not to re-sign him—starting quarterback Kordell Stewart was the only quarterback carryover for the 2000 season from 1999, a year they had four quarterbacks on the roster the entire season (Stewart, Mike Tomczak, Gonzalez, and Anthony Wright)—Gonzalez signed with the Indianapolis Colts on February 21, 2000, but was cut in training camp on August 3, 2000. Gonzalez was the last Steelers player to wear number 7 before Ben Roethlisberger arrived in 2004.

Gonzalez was signed by the Buffalo Bills on April 19, 2001. He was later released on August 22, 2001.

Gonzalez signed with the Hamilton Tiger-Cats of the Canadian Football League on May 7, 2002. He was the backup to Danny McManus in 2002 and 2003, dressing in all 36 games for the Tiger-Cats over that span. He completed 67 of 150 passes (44.7%) for 999 yards, four touchdowns and seven interceptions while also scoring two rushing touchdowns. Gonzalez was released on February 16, 2004.

== Personal life ==
Gonzalez and his wife Mandy have two children and live in the Pittsburgh area. He works outside of football, but does small consulting and training camps for junior high and high school quarterbacks and receivers in the Pittsburgh area.

Gonzalez is of Cuban descent.
