= Matt Lytle =

American gridiron football player (born 1975)

No. 8, 9, 7
- Position: Quarterback

Personal information
- Born: September 4, 1975 (age 51); Lancaster, Pennsylvania, U.S.
- Listed height: 6 ft 4 in (1.93 m)
- Listed weight: 225 lb (102 kg)

Career information
- High school: Wyomissing Area (Wyomissing, Pennsylvania)
- College: Pittsburgh (1995—1998)
- NFL draft: 1999: undrafted

Career history
- Carolina Panthers (1999)*; Rhein Fire (2000); Seattle Seahawks (2000); Carolina Panthers (2000–2001); Montreal Alouettes (2002); Baltimore Ravens (2003)*; Colorado Crush (2004)*
- * Offseason or practice squad member only

Awards and highlights
- Grey Cup champion (2002); World Bowl champion (2000)

Career NFL statistics
- Passing attempts: 30
- Passing completions: 17
- Completion percentage: 56.7%
- TD–INT: 1–3
- Passing yards: 133
- Passer rating: 39.3
- Stats at Pro Football Reference

Matthew Robert Lytle (born September 4, 1975) is an American former professional football player who was a quarterback for the Carolina Panthers and Seattle Seahawks of the National Football League (NFL). He played college football for the Pittsburgh Panthers. Lytle was also a member of the Rhein Fire, Montreal Alouettes, Baltimore Ravens, and Colorado Crush.

== Early life ==
Matthew Robert Lytle was born on September 4, 1975, in Lancaster, Pennsylvania. He attended Wyomissing Area Junior/Senior High School in Wyomissing, Pennsylvania.

== College career ==
Lytle was a four-year letterman for the Pittsburgh Panthers of the University of Pittsburgh from 1995 to 1998. Due to injuries to John Ryan and Pete Gonzalez, Lytle made his first career start on November 11, 1995, against the Syracuse Orange, completing 20 of 38 passes for 200 yards, one touchdown, and one interception in a 42–10 loss. Overall, he completed 37 of 71 (52.1%) for 299 yards, one touchdown, and four interceptions in 1995. Lytle began the 1996 season as the starter but was benched for Gonzalez after a 72–0 loss to Ohio State in the fourth game. Lytle later regained the starting job after leading the team to a 20-point fourth quarter in a 53–52 win over Temple during Gonzalez's second start. Overall in 1996, Lytle recorded 105 completions on 214 passing attempts (49.1%) for 1,249 yards, eight touchdowns, and six interceptions while also scoring one rushing touchdown. Gonzalez beat Lytle out for the starting job late in 1997 training camp. Lytle attempted only 13 passes during the 1997 season, completing five of them for 98 yards and a touchdown. Lytle regained the starting job in 1998 after Gonzalez's departure. Lytle completed 159 of 306 passes (52.0%) for 2,092 yards, 16 touchdowns, and 14 interceptions in 1998 while also scoring three rushing touchdowns.

== Professional career ==
=== Carolina Panthers and Rhein Fire ===
After going undrafted in the 1999 NFL draft, Lytle signed with the Carolina Panthers on April 23. He was released on September 5 and signed to the team's practice squad on September 7. He was released again on November 10 and signed to the practice squad again on November 17, 1999. Lytle became a free agent after the season and re-signed with the Panthers on February 14, 2000. In 2000, he was allocated to NFL Europe to play for the Rhein Fire. He played in nine games for the Fire during the 2000 NFL Europe season, completing 41 of 66 passes (62.1%) for 441 yards, four touchdowns, and one interception. The Fire won World Bowl VIII against the Scottish Claymores by a score of 13–10. Lytle was released by the Panthers on August 27, 2000.

=== Seattle Seahawks ===
Lytle was claimed off waivers by the Seattle Seahawks on August 28, 2000. He made his NFL debut on October 22 in a 31–3 loss to the Oakland Raiders, but did not record any statistics. He also appeared in the team's 17–15 win over the San Diego Chargers on November 5. Lytle was later waived on November 21 and re-signed to the practice squad on November 23.

=== Carolina Panthers (second stint) ===
On December 4, 2000, Lytle was signed off the practice squad to the Panthers' active roster after defensive end Jason Peter was placed on injured reserve. He was inactive for every game the rest of the season.

Lytle made his 2001 preseason debut for the Panthers on August 18 in a 23–8 loss to the New England Patriots. He attempted just one pass in the game, failing to connect with receiver Jim Turner. Lytle saw more extensive action in the preseason finale against the Cleveland Browns on August 31. After a 90-yard kickoff returned for a touchdown by Browns receiver Andre King with five minutes remaining in the game, Lytle led the two-play, 59-yard drive which culminated with a 51-yard touchdown to receiver Dialleo Burks. Lytle finished the game 5-for-8 for 114 yards and a touchdown, while also carrying the ball twice for a total of five yards, as the Panthers beat the Browns 23–20. Lytle began the 2001 season as the Panthers' third-string quarterback behind starter Chris Weinke and backup Dameyune Craig. He made his regular season Panthers debut on November 4 against the Miami Dolphins after Weinke went down with a shoulder injury and Craig with a foot injury. Lytle played the final six minutes of the game against the Dolphins, going 2-for-4 for seven yards and losing 13 yards on two sacks as the Panthers lost 23–6. The following week against the St. Louis Rams, Lytle made his first and only NFL start. He completed 15 of 25 passes for 126 yards and a touchdown while rushing for eight yards on two carries. However, he was also intercepted by Rams defensive backs Kim Herring and Aeneas Williams. His first career touchdown pass came on a four-yard grab by tight end Kris Mangum, but the Panthers fell to the Rams 48–14. Lytle's final Panthers appearance came the following month in a 27–23 loss to the New Orleans Saints. Lytle threw just one pass in the game after Weinke went down with a concussion, and was intercepted by cornerback Fred Thomas.

The following offseason, Lytle was tendered a contract offer by the Panthers as an exclusive-rights free agent. However, the team rescinded the offer on May 21, 2002, making him an unrestricted free agent.

=== Montreal Alouettes ===
Lytle played with the Montreal Alouettes of the Canadian Football League (CFL) in 2002. He was the backup to longtime CFL star Anthony Calvillo with the Als. Lytle played seven games (with one start), and went 11/27 passing for 182 yards, throwing one touchdown and one interception.

=== Baltimore Ravens ===
After spending the 2002 season in the CFL, Lytle was signed by the Baltimore Ravens on July 23, 2003. He failed to make the team out of training camp, however, and was released on August 25.

=== Colorado Crush ===
On November 23, 2003, Lytle signed with the Colorado Crush of the Arena Football League. However, he failed to earn a job with the team on opening day and was released in favor of Jose Davis and John Dutton on February 2, 2004.
