= Katrina Szish =

American television personality and journalist

- Born: March 6, 1972 (age 54); Wyomissing, Pennsylvania, US

Katrina Szish (/zɪʃ/ ZISH) is an American television personality, broadcaster and journalist. Szish announced in early May 2022 that she had joined Newsmax TV as an afternoon anchor, pairing with Bob Sellers to host daily the channel's American Agenda two-hour program. She was previously a regular contributor on Fox Business Network and the Wendy Williams Show. She was an entertainment contributor for Good Afternoon America and a contributing correspondent for The Early Show on CBS News. She formerly hosted Cindy Crawford's Meaningful Beauty infomercial.

Szish has a background in journalism, having held numerous positions at fashion magazines, including YM, VOGUE, and GQ magazine. She has worked alongside Barbara Walters, Larry King, Diane Sawyer and Bill O'Reilly. Szish has appeared at the Oscar Awards and has interviewed celebrities and designers, including Justin Timberlake and Oleg Cassini (she conducted the last known televised interview with him for ABC News prior to his death in 2006), Szish currently lives in New York City with her husband, Marc Korczykowski.

== Biography ==
Szish was born in Wyomissing, Pennsylvania, where she grew up an only child, the daughter of Dr. Ronald C. Szish and Maureen Szish. At 13, she was named a national finalist in YM magazine's cover model contest and was featured in a fashion editorial spread shot by Patrick Demarchelier. She then signed on with CLICK modeling agency in NYC and World Top agency in Tokyo, and continued modeling for clients such as L'Oréal and Shiseido through the early 1990s. She graduated from Wyomissing High School at the top of her class in 1990 and was accepted into the Medill School of Journalism at Northwestern University. After completing her sophomore year at Northwestern, she took a year off after being accepted into an internship program with CNN's Political Investigation Unit in Washington, DC. Szish then transferred to Harvard University where she was a member of the Hasty Pudding Club, wrote for The Harvard Crimson and was a member of the college television station. In 1996, after writing a thesis on fashion, film and concepts of identity, she graduated cum laude from Harvard with a BA degree in English & American Literature and Language.

== Career ==
=== Magazines ===
After completing an internship with CNN's Style with Elsa Klensch in New York City, Szish joined GQ magazine as an editorial assistant and writer. She was later named a fashion writer/editor at VOGUE, where she wrote and edited "Scoop", a monthly trend column in addition to covering Fashion Week and writing feature articles for the magazine. In 2000, she was named Editor In Chief/Special Issues and Fashion Features Director for YM, and in 2001, she returned to GQ as Senior Editor and worked for her mentor, Art Cooper, until his retirement in 2003. Szish returned to broadcasting and worked as a freelance producer and on-camera reporter for VOGUE's Trend Watch, a television show.

=== Television ===
In 2004, Szish was named on-air correspondent for Us Weekly. From 2004 to 2007 Szish covered breaking celebrity news, style and pop culture and logged numerous television appearances on The Today Show, The Early Show, Good Morning America, The View, Entertainment Tonight, 20/20, Larry King Live, The O'Reilly Factor, Access Hollywood, Inside Edition, MTV, VH-1, The History Channel, MSNBC, HLN and CNN. Szish simultaneously served as a contributing anchor and host for ABC News Now and ABC News on MTV-U, as a columnist for ABCNEWS.com and as a correspondent for E!'s "The Daily 10" and "Fashion Police". In 2006, Szish was tapped by The Food Network to co-host a destination spa special. In 2007, Szish was named National Correspondent for InStyle. While at InStyle, Szish made regular appearances on The Today Show, TBS Movie and a Makeover, CNN, CBS' The Early Show, and she garnered a recurring role on "Tim Gunn's Guide to Style" on BRAVO. In 2009, Szish left her full-time position at InStyle to pursue independent broadcasting, marketing and new media projects. She worked with Toni Senecal and WPIX Channel 11 as lifestyle correspondent for "Toni On New York." She remains a regular contributor to TBS' "Movie & A Makeover," CNN, HLN, CBS, Fox News Channel and Fox Business Network.

Szish is a public speaker, addressing women and teens on life lessons and career advice. She is also involved in a variety of animal charity organizations including Amanda Hearst's Friends of Finn. She formerly worked a few years at QVC selling various items on a show called The Szish List. She is now co-host of American Agenda on Newsmax.
