= Wyomissing Hills, Pennsylvania =

Unincorporated community in Pennsylvania, US

- Former borough
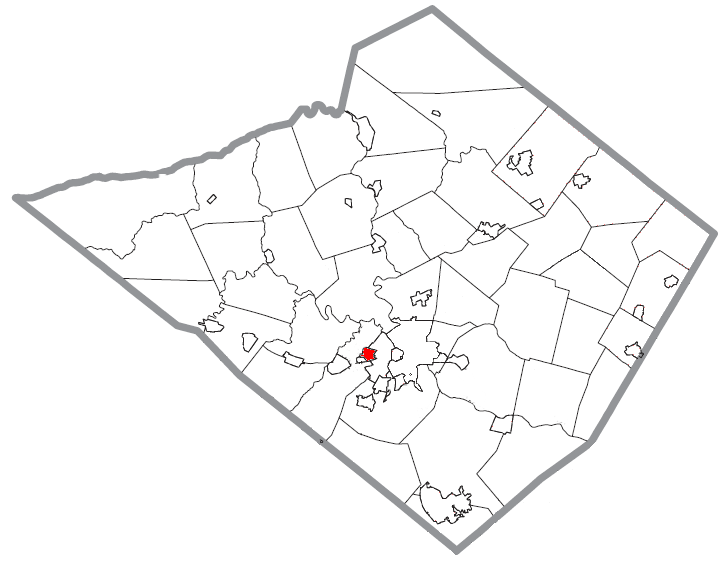
- Location within Berks County

- Location within Pennsylvania and the United States Wyomissing Hills (the United States)
- Coordinates: 40°20′5″N 75°58′54″W
- Country: United States
- State: Pennsylvania
- County: Berks

Area
  - Total: 0.7 sq mi (1.8 km^{2})
  - Land: 0.7 sq mi (1.8 km^{2})

Population (2000)
  - Total: 2,568
  - Density: 3,700/sq mi (1,400/km^{2})
- Time zone: UTC-5 (Eastern (EST))
  - Summer (DST): UTC-4 (EDT)

Wyomissing Hills was a borough in Berks County, Pennsylvania, that merged into Wyomissing in January, 2002. The population was 2,568 at the 2000 census.

== Geography ==
According to the U.S. Census Bureau, the borough had a total area of 0.7 square miles (1.8 km^{2}), all land.

== Demographics ==
Historical population
Census	Pop.	Note	%±
1980	2,150		—
1990	2,469		14.8%
2000	2,568		4.0%

At the 2000 census, there were 2,568 people, 986 households, and 771 families living in the borough. The population density was 3,606.6 inhabitants per square mile (1,392.5/km^{2}). There were 1,011 housing units at an average density of 1,419.9 per square mile (548.2/km^{2}). The racial makeup of the borough was 93.42 percent White, 0.86% African American, 0.16 percent Native American, 3.66 percent Asian, 0.97 percent from other races, and 0.93 percent from two or more races. Hispanic or Latino of any race were 2.02 percent.

There were 986 households, 30.3 percent had children under the age of 18 living with them, 71.1 percent were married couples living together, 5.5 percent had a female householder with no husband present, and 21.8 percent were non-families. 18.8 percent of households were made up of individuals, and 11.4 percent had someone living alone who is 65 or older. The average household size was 2.60 and the average family size was 2.98.

The age distribution was 22.7 percent under the age of 18, 5.5 percent from 18 to 24, 20.6 percent from 25 to 44, 31.0 percent from 45 to 64, and 20.1 percent 65 or older. The median age was 46 years. For every 100 females, there were 93.1 males. For every 100 females age 18 and over, there were 90.7 males.

The median household income was $61,364 and the median family income was $71,193. Males had a median income of $63,214 versus $26,875 for females. The per capita income for the borough was $34,024. About 1.8 percent of families and 2.5 percent of the population overall were below the poverty line, including 4.7 percent of those under age 18 and 0.8 percent of those age 65 or over.
