= Rio Gomez =

Colombian-American baseball player (born 1994)

Long Island Ducks – No. 49
- Pitcher
- Born: October 20, 1994 (age 31); Miami, Florida, U.S.
- Bats: Left Throws: Left

CPBL debut
- March 30, 2024, for the Wei Chuan Dragons

CPBL statistics (through 2025 season)
- Win–loss record: 5–5
- Earned run average: 1.60
- Strikeouts: 101
- Stats at Baseball Reference

Teams
- Wei Chuan Dragons (2024); Fubon Guardians (2025)

Rio Andres Gomez (born October 20, 1994) is a Colombian and American professional baseball pitcher for the Long Island Ducks of the Atlantic League of Professional Baseball. He has previously played in the Chinese Professional Baseball League (CPBL) for the Wei Chuan Dragons and Fubon Guardians.

== Amateur career ==
Gomez graduated from Desert Vista High School in Phoenix, Arizona. He was cut from the varsity baseball team in his senior year. Gomez attended Mesa Community College and walked on to the school's college baseball team. He then transferred to the University of Arizona and played for the Arizona Wildcats baseball team as a walk-on. In 2016, he played collegiate summer baseball with the Cotuit Kettleers of the Cape Cod Baseball League.

== Professional career ==
=== Boston Red Sox ===
The Boston Red Sox drafted Gomez in the 36th round, with the 1,091st overall selection, of the 2017 Major League Baseball draft. He spent his first professional season split between the rookie–level Gulf Coast League Red Sox, and Low–A Lowell Spinners, accumulating a 3.06 ERA across 16 contests. In 2018, Gomez pitched for Lowell and the Single–A Greenville Drive, making a combined 18 appearances and posting a 2.02 ERA with 34 strikeouts across 35 2/3 innings of work.

Gomez split the 2019 season between Greenville and the High–A Salem Red Sox. In 39 appearances out of the bullpen between the two clubs, he registered a cumulative 2.20 ERA with 75 strikeouts and 7 saves across 69 2/3 innings pitched. Gomez did not play in a game in 2020 due to the cancellation of the minor league season because of the COVID-19 pandemic. He returned to action in 2021, splitting the year between Salem and the Double–A Portland Sea Dogs. In 29 combined appearances, Gomez logged a 3.64 ERA with 60 strikeouts across 47.0 innings of work.

He returned to Portland in 2022 and spent the entirety of the season with the team, appearing in 24 games and struggling to a 6.55 ERA with 41 strikeouts in 33.0 innings pitched. Gomez began the 2023 season with the Portland, and was promoted to the Worcester Red Sox in June. In 26 games (13 starts) between the two affiliates, he recorded a 4.95 ERA with 88 strikeouts in 76 1/3 innings of work. Gomez became a free agent following the season on November 6, 2023.

=== Wei Chuan Dragons ===
On February 6, 2024, Gomez signed with the Wei Chuan Dragons of the Chinese Professional Baseball League. In 63 appearances for the Dragons, Gomez logged a 5-3 record and 1.17 ERA with 94 strikeouts across 92 1/3 innings pitched.

=== Fubon Guardians ===
On March 3, 2025, Gomez signed with the Fubon Guardians of the Chinese Professional Baseball League. Gomez made two starts for Fubon, struggling to an 0-2 record and 6.00 ERA with seven strikeouts across nine innings pitched; however, he suffered a tear in his elbow ligament during his second start. On May 21, Gomez was released by the Guardians.

=== Tecolotes de los Dos Laredos ===
On March 22, 2026, Gomez signed with the Tecolotes de los Dos Laredos of the Mexican League. In 23 relief appearances, he posted a 2–2 record with a 3.00 ERA, 14 strikeouts, and eight walks across 18 innings pitched.

=== Sultanes de Monterrey ===
On June 15, 2026, Gomez was traded to the Sultanes de Monterrey of the Mexican League. In nine relief appearances for the Sultanes, he posted a 6.75 ERA with eight strikeouts and two walks across 6 2/3 innings pitched. On July 16, Gomez was released by Monterrey.

=== Long Island Ducks ===
On July 26, 2026, Gomez signed with the Long Island Ducks of the Atlantic League of Professional Baseball.

== International career ==
Gomez played for the Colombian national baseball team, representing his mother's home country, in the 2023 World Baseball Classic. He pitched 1 1/3 innings of scoreless relief against the Canadian national team, striking out Jacob Robson and Edouard Julien.

Gomez was named to the Colombian roster for the 2026 World Baseball Classic qualifiers, held in March 2025 in Tucson, Arizona. In three innings of work against China, he allowed three hits and one unearned run, registering six strikeouts in the 8-1 win.

== Personal life ==
Gomez is the oldest son of Sandi and Pedro Gomez, a baseball journalist. He has Colombian ancestry through his mother and Cuban ancestry through his father, who died in 2021. Pedro Gomez predicted that his son would play for the Colombian national team six years before the 2023 WBC.
