= Wyomissing Area Junior/Senior High School =

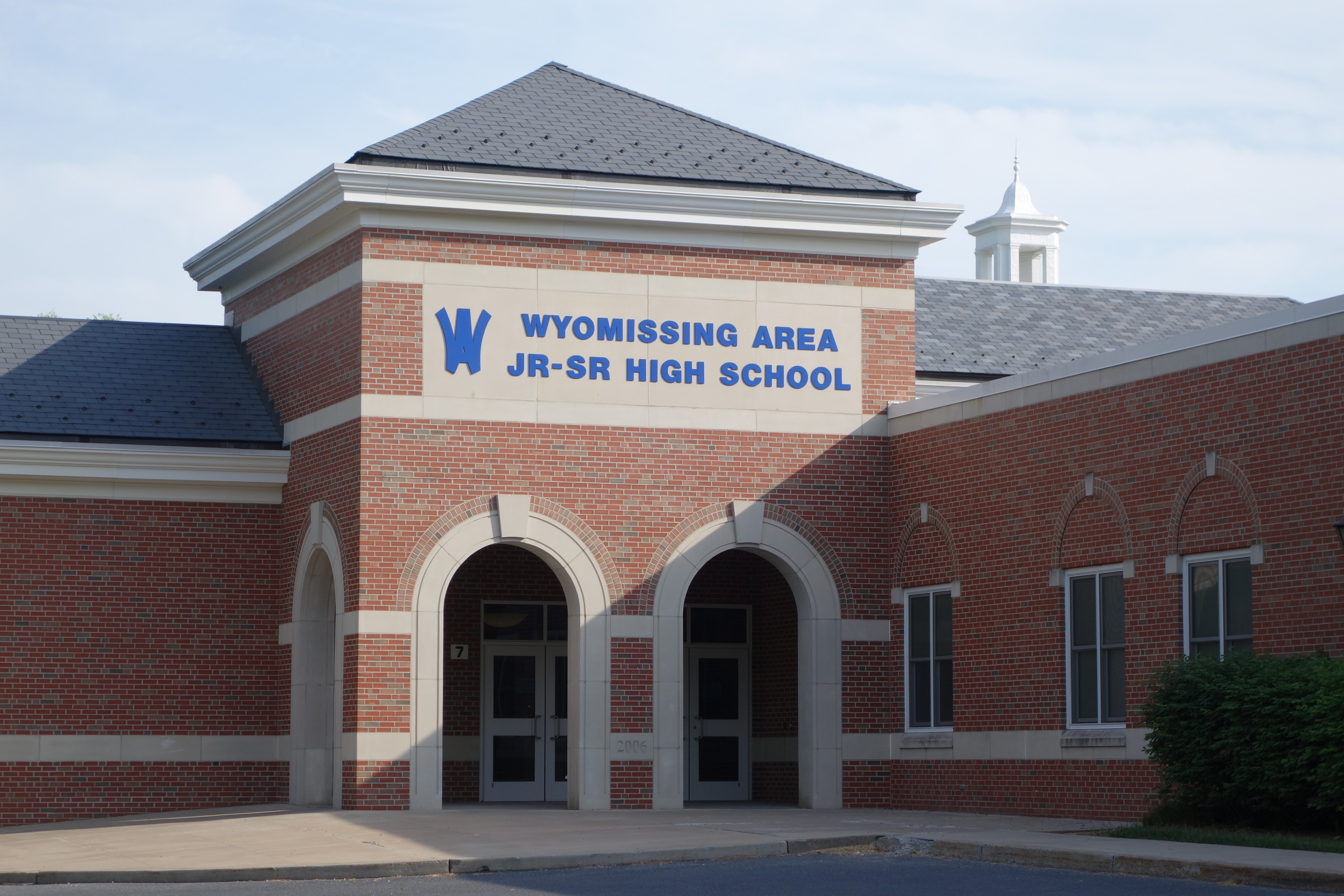
- Wyomissing Area Junior/Senior High School in June 2015

Location
- 630 Evans Avenue; Wyomissing, Berks County, PA, 19610; United States; 40.3243°N 75.9716°W

Information
- Funding type: Public
- Motto: Esse quam videri (Latin) (To be, rather than to seem)
- Established: 1908
- School district: Wyomissing Area School District
- Principal: Abigail Houck, acting
- Staff: 81.20 (on an FTE basis)
- Grades: 7–12
- Enrollment: 938 (2023–2024)
- Student to teacher ratio: 11.55
- Campus: Suburban
- Colors: Navy blue and white
- Slogan: Inspiring Excellence, One Spartan at a Time
- Team name: Spartans
- Rival: Berks Catholic High School
- Yearbook: The Colophon
- Website: School website

Wyomissing Area Junior/Senior High School is a secondary school serving the Wyomissing Area School District. Located in the borough of Wyomissing, Pennsylvania, United States, the school has approximately 900 students in grades seven through twelve. WAHS has been included in Newsweek's list of top 1,200 public high schools in the United States annually since 2006.

In 2014, The Washington Post named WAHS the most challenging public school in the state, excluding magnet and charter schools, and U.S. News & World Report ranked it as the best public school in Pennsylvania, excluding magnet and charter schools.

== History ==
In 1909, the Wyomissing School District was founded, and classes began being taught in a private residence. In 1908, the district's first building was completed on Belmont Avenue and served grades 1-11 until 1922; seniors attended another area high school. It served grades 1-6 until 1939. This building is now the Wyomissing Institute of Fine Arts. The first dedicated high school building was constructed in 1923 on Wyomissing Boulevard. This building remained the high school until 1939, when it became the elementary school and the high school moved to Evans Avenue. The current high school was constructed in 1940, as part of Franklin Roosevelt's depression recovery program, the Works Projects Administration. The building was expanded to meet the growing student body in 1965, and was renovated in 1994. The Wyomissing School District became the Wyomissing Area School District upon merging with the former West Reading School District in the late 1960s. In 1984, the original high school, which was built in 1923, was destroyed and the land was sold for housing.

An addition was finished in September 2006, which added several classrooms, a chorus room, and a stagecraft workshop. The somewhat controversial renovation removed two courtyards in the school, many windows in classrooms, and part of the student parking area. The school's auditorium was also renovated. This included removing the windows, replacing the seats, installing new curtains and carpeting, repainting, and installing garage doors in the stage right wing and a new set construction rooms so that scenery could be moved.

== Academics ==
There are 567 sections of 183 courses in basic core areas and in electives. The school offers 30 honors and 23 Advanced Placement courses. During the 2021-22 school year, 481 AP exams were administered to 189 students, and 77% of students scored 3 or higher on the exam (from 1-5). The same year, the average SAT score was 1145 (557 in math and 587 in ELA); the state average was 1091 (540 in math and 551 in ELA). The school has a 95% graduation rate, with 94% of high school seniors attending a two- or four-year institution of higher education.

== Student demographics ==
As of the 2021-22 school year, the Wyomissing Area Junior-Senior High School has an average of 146 students in each grade. 49% of students are male and 51% are female.

0.3% of students are Native Hawaiian/Pacific Islander. 0.4% of students are American Indian/Alaska Native. 2.9% are Asian, 5.4% are African-American, 26.5% are Hispanic, 60.9% are Caucasian, and 3.2% report themselves as two or more races. 33.6% of students are eligible for free or reduced-price lunch under the National School Lunch Act of 1946.

According to a 2023 report from the Wyomissing Area School District, 35.3% of students in the district are economically disadvantaged, 15.7% are enrolled in the district's Special Education program, 5.5% have a Gifted IEP, and 3.3% are Limited English Proficient Students.

Of the Class of 2022, 75% of students reported they were planning to attend a 4-year college after graduation. 17% planned to go straight to employment, 10% planned to attend a 2-year college, 3% planned to go to a career and technical school, and 1 student planned to have a postgraduate year. The 4-year cohort graduation rate for 2022 was 96.36%, which is 4.01 percentage points higher than the previous year.

== Extracurricular activities ==
The school offers a number of opportunities for student participation outside of the classroom.

=== Athletics ===
Since the early 1990s, the school has won the PIAA state championship in boys' football (2012), boys' soccer (1994), girls' cross country (1999, 2000, 2001, 2002), boys’ cross country (2017), girls' tennis (2000, 2001, 2002, 2003, 2016), boys' track (2003), boys' volleyball (2008), boys' tennis (2009, 2010, 2012), and golf (2012).

The school fields the following teams:

- Baseball
- Basketball
- Bowling
- Cheerleading
- Color guard
- Cross country
- eSports
- Field hockey
- Football
- Golf
- Lacrosse
- Marching band
- Boys' soccer
- Girls' soccer
- Softball
- Swimming
- Tennis
- Spring track and field
- Winter track and field
- Volleyball
- Wrestling
- Water polo

=== Clubs ===
The school offers the following extracurricular clubs:

- Aevidum Club
- Art Club
- Best Buddies
- Big Spartan/Little Spartan
- Brass Ensemble
- Camerata
- Chariot student newspaper
- Chess Club
- Colophon yearbook
- Color Guard
- Concert Band
- Concert Choir
- Cooking Club
- Debate Team
- Drama Club
- Environmental Club
- French Club
- Gay-Straight Alliance
- Hope Squad
- Jazz Band
- Latin Club
- Literary-Art Magazine
- Marching Band
- Math Team
- Memory Book yearbook
- Mini-THON
- Model UN
- Orchestra
- Peer Mediation
- Pit Orchestra
- Science Olympiad
- Service Club
- Ski Club
- Small String Ensemble
- Spanish Club
- STEAM Club
- Student Council
- Student Tutoring
- Wyo5Live
- QuizBowl Team

== Notable alumni ==
- Alex Anzalone, professional football player, Detroit Lions
- Douglas Carter Beane, playwright
- Megan Gallagher, Broadway actress
- Jon Gosselin, reality television personality
- Max Hurleman, NFL wide receiver for the Pittsburgh Steelers
- Matt Lytle, former professional football player, Carolina Panthers and Seattle Seahawks
- Tikhon Mollard, Primate of Eastern Orthodox Church in America, Metropolitan of All America and Canada
- Taylor Swift, Grammy Award-winning singer, songwriter, and actress (attended but did not graduate)
- Katrina Szish, television host and features contributor for CBS' The Early Show
- Ross Tucker, former professional football player, journalist, broadcaster, and radio host
- Dave Weiner, guitarist
