= Kerwin Hairston =

Former American football defensive tackle

No. 93, 96
- Position: Defensive tackle

Personal information
- Born: December 21, 1975 (age 50)
- Listed height: 6 ft 3 in (1.91 m)
- Listed weight: 295 lb (134 kg)

Career information
- High school: Fieldale-Collinsville (Henry County, VA)
- College: Virginia Tech (1995–1997)

Career history
- Buffalo Destroyers (2001–2002); Georgia Force (2003)

Awards and highlights
- First-team All-Big East (1997)

Kerwin Hairston (born December 21, 1975) is an American former football defensive tackle. He played college football for the Virginia Tech Hokies from 1995 to 1997. He began at Virginia Tech as a walk-on and played for the junior-varsity in 1994. He was selected as a first-team defensive lineman on the 1997 All-Big East Conference football team. He also played professional arena football with the Buffalo Destroyers and Georgia Force from 2001 to 2003.
