= Nate Terry =

Former American football defensive tackle

No. 29, 28, 11, 6
- Positions: Cornerback, return specialist

Personal information
- Born: October 5, 1976 (age 50); Homestead, Florida, U.S.
- Listed height: 6 ft 2 in (1.88 m)
- Listed weight: 185 lb (84 kg)

Career information
- College: West Virginia (1997–1999)

Career history
- Cleveland Browns (2000)*; Saskatchewan Roughriders (2000); Scottish Claymores (2001); Seattle Seahawks (2001)*; Calgary Stampeders (2004–2005)
- * Offseason or practice squad member only

Awards and highlights
- First-team All-Big East (1997)

Nate Terry (born October 5, 1976) is an American former football cornerback and return specialist. He played college football for the West Virginia Mountaineers from 1997 to 1999. In 1997, he returned 26 kickoffs for 650 yards (25.0 yards per return) and 31 punts for 344 yards (11.1 yards per return). He also led the country with two touchdown returns for touchdown in 1997. was also selected as a first-team cornerback on the 1997 All-Big East Conference football team. He signed with the Cleveland Browns as a free agent in 2000, but did not make the final roster. He also played professional football for the Saskatchewan Roughriders (2000), Scottish Claymores (2001), and Calgary Stampeders (2004–2005).
