= Anne Phillips (singer) =

American singer, songwriter, and producer

- Born: Wyomissing, Pennsylvania
- Formerly of: Ray Charles Singers

Anne Phillips is an American singer, songwriter, and producer. She has worked with Burt Bacharach, Carole King, Mahalia Jackson and has arranged and produced jingles for the Four Tops and Martha and the Vandellas.

== Early life ==
Phillips grew up in Wyomissing, Pennsylvania. She played piano growing up but did not hear jazz until she was a senior in high school. Phillips studied at Oberlin College where she sang with the school's big band and had a radio show. She then moved to New York at age 19 and played piano and clubs.

== Career ==
Phillips started working in demo recordings for songwriters in the 1950s. She was a member of the Ray Charles Singers on the Perry Como Show. In 1959, she recorded her first pop album, Born to Be Blue, for Roulette Records.

Phillips has worked as a singer, music arranger, conductor, writer, and producer for national commercials including Pepsi, Revlon, and Sheraton. For some campaigns, she did vocal arrangements in the style of other popular artists. Phillips composed music for a Pepsi campaign with BBDO in the 1960s called "The Taste That Beats the Others Cold, Pepsi Pours it On. The spot included The Turtles, The Four Tops, The Hondells, and the Trade Masters.

Phillips worked on demo recordings for Carole King, Burt Bacharach, and Neil Diamond. In 1962, she sang background vocals on Carole King's It Might As Well Rain Until September.

Phillips is the founder of Kindred Spirits, a not-for-profit organization founded with her husband, Bob Kindred. The organization sponsors a yearly performance of Bending Towards the Light – A Jazz Nativity,” composed by Phillips. They also have an educational program for inner-city children called The Kindred Spirits Children’s Jazz Choirs which teaches jazz music.
