= Pedro Gomez (journalist) =

American sports journalist (1962–2021)

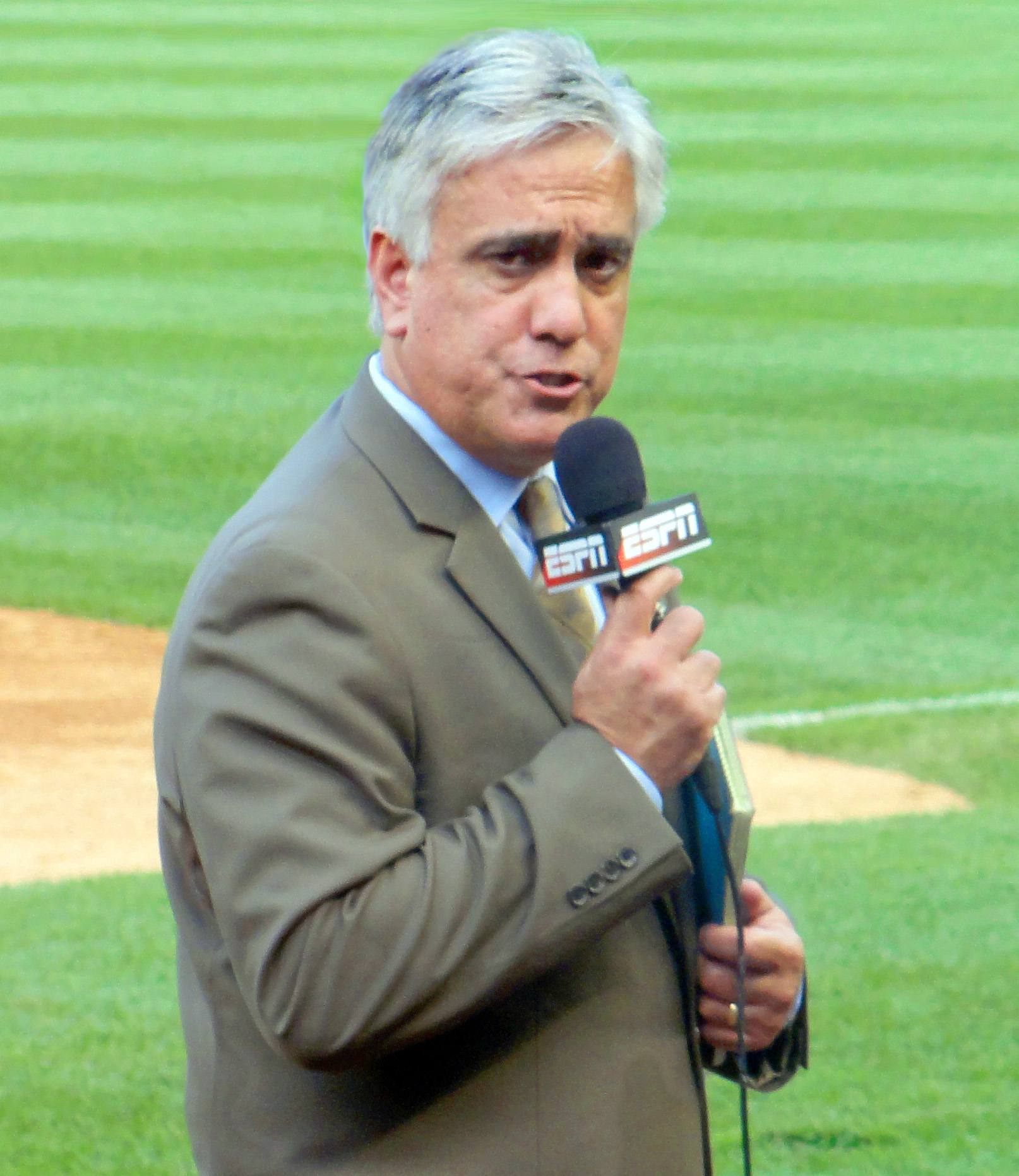
- Gomez reporting from Yankee Stadium in 2011
- Born: August 20, 1962; Miami, Florida, U.S.
- Died: February 7, 2021 (aged 58); Phoenix, Arizona, U.S.
- Education: Miami-Dade Community College; University of Miami
- Occupations: Reporter; Sports journalist
- Years active: 1985–2021
- Spouse: Sandra Gomez
- Children: 3

Pedro Gomez (August 20, 1962 – February 7, 2021) was an American sports journalist. He worked as a reporter for ESPN from 2003 to 2021, contributing to the network's SportsCenter show. He was primarily a baseball reporter and was also a member of the Baseball Writers' Association of America who cast election votes for the Baseball Hall of Fame. He covered 25 World Series and 22 Major League Baseball All-Star Games.

== Early life ==
Gomez was the son of Cuban refugees, born just 20 days after his parents arrived in the United States in August 1962, two months before the Cuban Missile Crisis. Gomez attended Coral Park High School in Miami, where he was a year ahead of future major league player Jose Canseco. Gomez then went to Miami-Dade Community College (south campus) and the University of Miami.

== Career ==
Gomez wrote for The Miami News from 1985 to 1988 and then The San Diego Union from 1988 to 1990. After years of covering high schools and general assignment sports in Miami, San Diego, and the San Francisco Bay Area, Gomez became a full-time baseball beat writer in 1992, covering the Oakland Athletics for the San Jose Mercury News and The Sacramento Bee from 1990 to 1997. Those Oakland squads featured stars including Rickey Henderson and "Bash Brothers" Jose Canseco and Mark McGwire. Gomez said that covering those A's was like "we were traveling with The [Rolling] Stones."

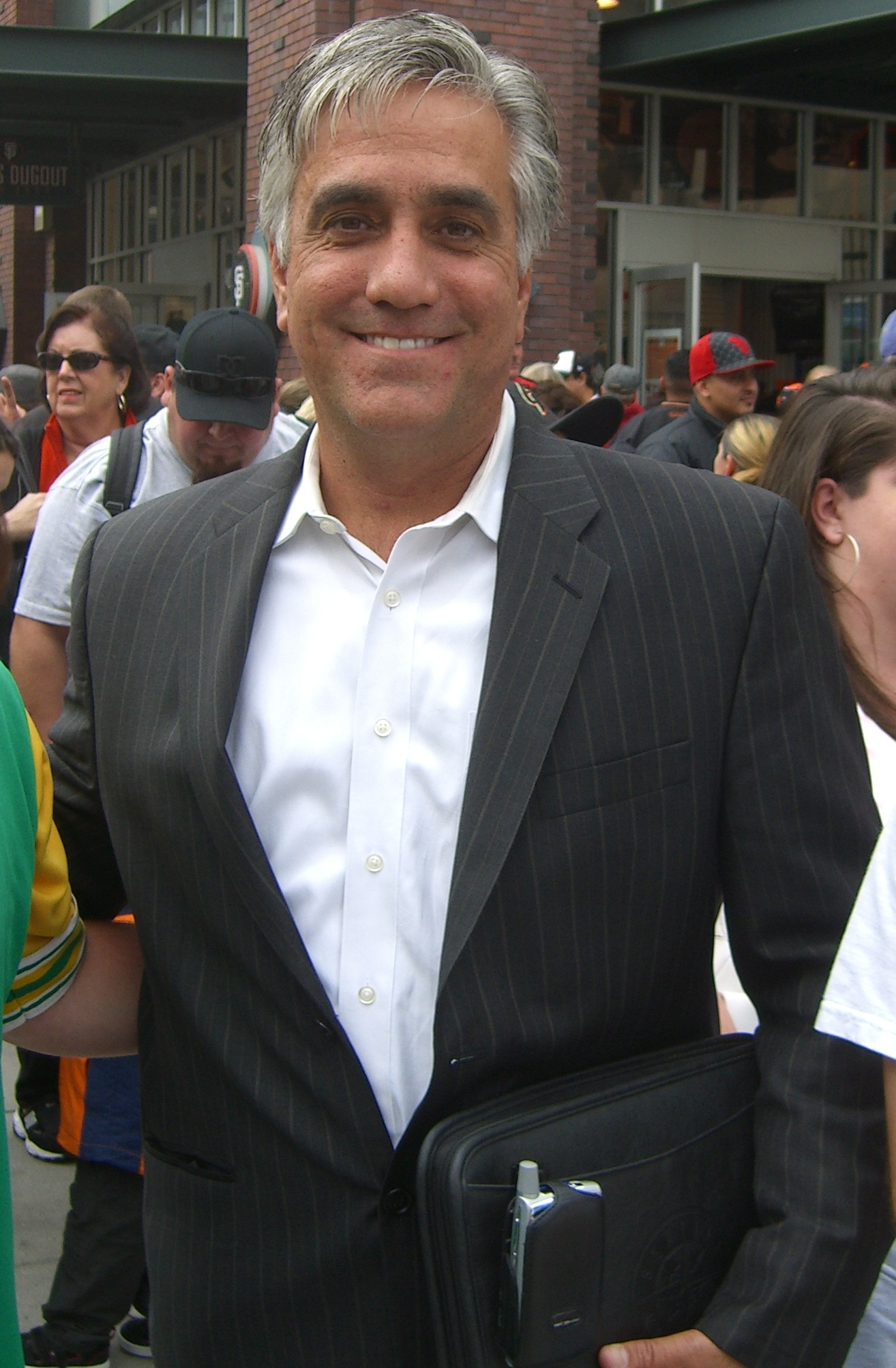
Gomez in 2006

Gomez gained much experience during this seven-year period as a newspaper writer. His work in Sacramento, San Jose and later as a national baseball writer and general sports columnist for The Arizona Republic in Phoenix from 1997 to 2003 led to ESPN's hiring of him in 2003 to work at SportsCenter. Gomez specialized in baseball reporting for ESPN and followed Barry Bonds for the better part of three seasons as Bonds pursued Hank Aaron for the all-time MLB home run record. Gomez's favorite event that he covered was Game 6 of the 2003 National League Championship Series, when Chicago Cubs fan Steve Bartman attempted to catch a foul ball against the Miami Marlins, who went on to score eight times in the inning. In 2016, Gomez went to Cuba to cover an exhibition game between the Tampa Bay Rays and the Cuba national team, the first visit by an MLB club in almost two decades. He also appeared on Baseball Tonight and other studio shows.

Gomez also covered sports other than baseball, including working as a sideline reporter during MLS Cup 2008. He covered a U.S. men's national soccer team in Havana in 2008.

== Personal life and death ==
Gomez and his wife, Sandi, had three children; he resided in Phoenix, Arizona. His son Rio played college baseball as a left-handed pitcher for the Arizona Wildcats baseball team, before starting a professional baseball career within the Boston Red Sox organization. Rio represented Colombia, Sandi's home country, in the 2023 World Baseball Classic, pitching 1 1/3 innings of scoreless relief against Canada.

Gomez died from a heart attack at his home in Phoenix on February 7, 2021, at the age of 58.
