= Quinton Spotwood =

Former American football wide receiver (born 1977)

No. 80
- Positions: Wide receiver, return specialist

Personal information
- Born: December 13, 1977 (age 48); Newark, New Jersey, U.S.

Career information
- High school: Elizabeth HS (Elizabeth, NJ)
- College: Syracuse (1996–1999)

Career history
- Miami Dolphins (2000)*; Dallas Cowboys (2000)*; New York Giants (2000–2001)*; Hamilton Tiger Cats (2002); Montreal Alouettes (2003)*
- * Offseason or practice squad member only

Awards and highlights
- First-team All-Big East (1997)

Quinton Shar Spotwood (born November 13, 1977) is an American former football wide receiver and return specialist. He was born and raised in New Jersey and attended Elizabeth High School.

Spotwood played college football for the Syracuse Orange from 1996 to 1999. As a sophomore in 1997, he tallied 41 receptions for 797 yards and was selected as a first-team player at both wide receiver and return specialist on the 1997 All-Big East Conference football team. In four years at Syracuse, he tallied 105 receptions for 1,653 yards and 15 touchdowns.

Spotwood also spent time in pre-seasons and on taxi squads with the Miami Dolphins, Dallas Cowboys, and New York Giants from 2000 to 2001. He played for the Hamilton Tiger Cats of the Canadian Football League in 2002.
