= Alex Anzalone =

American football player (born 1994)

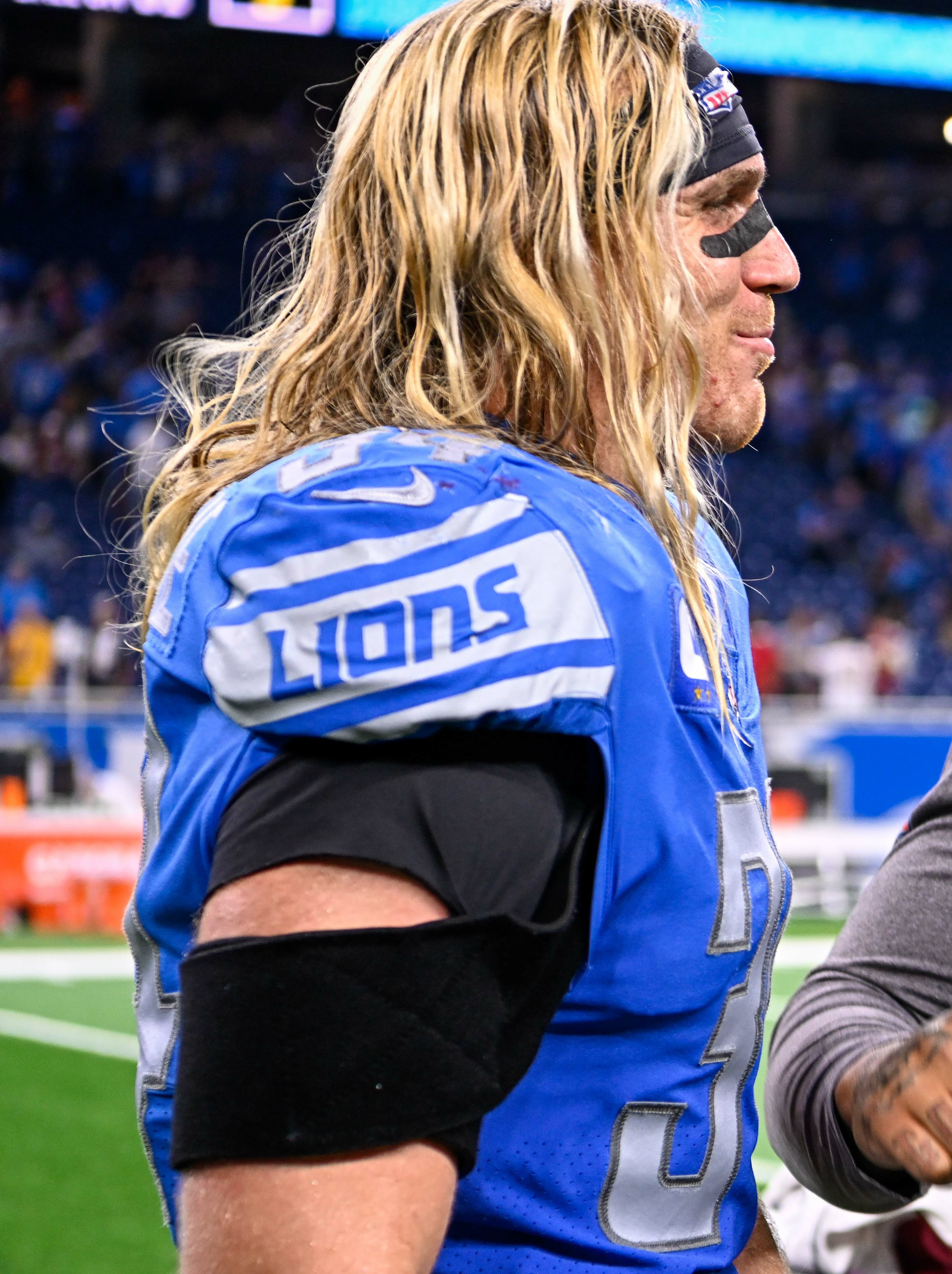
- Anzalone with the Detroit Lions in 2022

No. 34 – Tampa Bay Buccaneers
- Position: Linebacker
- Roster status: Active

Personal information
- Born: September 22, 1994 (age 32); Wyomissing, Pennsylvania, U.S.
- Listed height: 6 ft 3 in (1.91 m)
- Listed weight: 234 lb (106 kg)

Career information
- High school: Wyomissing Area
- College: Florida (2013–2016)
- NFL draft: 2017: 3rd round, 76th overall pick

Career history
- New Orleans Saints (2017–2020); Detroit Lions (2021–2025); Tampa Bay Buccaneers (2026–present)

Career NFL statistics as of Week 9, 2026
- Total tackles: 657
- Sacks: 14
- Forced fumbles: 3
- Fumble recoveries: 2
- Interceptions: 8
- Pass deflections: 40
- Stats at Pro Football Reference

Alex Anzalone (/ˈænzəˈloʊni/ an-zə-LOW-nee, born September 22, 1994) is an American professional football linebacker for the Tampa Bay Buccaneers of the National Football League (NFL). He played college football for the Florida Gators. Anzalone was selected in the third round by the New Orleans Saints in the 2017 NFL draft.

== College career ==
Anzalone originally committed to Ohio State and Notre Dame but chose to play college football at University of Florida from 2013 to 2016.

During the four-year span, he missed 20 games due to injuries with his only full season being the 2014 season as the backup linebacker. He played ten games in 2013, two games in 2015, and seven games in 2016. He forewent his final year of college eligibility to enter the 2017 NFL draft.

== Professional career ==
Pre-draft measurables
Height	Weight	Arm length	Hand span	Wingspan	40-yard dash	10-yard split	20-yard split	20-yard shuttle	Three-cone drill	Vertical jump	Broad jump	Bench press
6 ft 2 7/8 in (1.90 m)	241 lb (109 kg)	32 1/8 in (0.82 m)	9 1/8 in (0.23 m)	6 ft 4 3/8 in (1.94 m)	4.63 s	1.57 s	2.69 s	4.25 s	6.88 s	30.5 in (0.77 m)	9 ft 8 in (2.95 m)	16 reps
All values from NFL Combine

=== New Orleans Saints ===
The New Orleans Saints selected Anzalone in the third round (76th overall) of the 2017 NFL draft. He was the tenth linebacker selected in 2017. On June 2, 2017, the Saints signed Anzalone to a four-year, $3.46 million contract that included a signing bonus of $864,592.

Anzalone earned a starting outside linebacker job for the Saints as a rookie, starting all four games in which he played. In Week 4 against the Dolphins, he suffered a shoulder injury and was placed on injured reserve on October 4, 2017.

He played in all 16 games, starting seven, in the 2018 season. He finished with two sacks, 59 total tackles (45 solo), one interception, two passes defended, and three forced fumbles. Anzalone was placed on injured reserve on September 16, 2019. In the 2019 season, he appeared in two games and had one sack. In the 2020 season, he appeared in 16 games and started nine. He finished with 41 total tackles (22 solo).

=== Detroit Lions ===
Anzalone signed with the Detroit Lions on March 24, 2021. He entered the 2021 season as a starting linebacker. He started the first 14 games before suffering a shoulder injury in Week 15. He was placed on injured reserve on December 20. In the 2021 season, he appeared in and started 14 games. He finished with one sack, 78 total tackles (49 solo), one interception, and seven passes defended.

In March 2022, Anzalone re-signed with the Lions. In the 2022 season, he started in all 17 games. He finished with 1.5 sacks, 125 total tackles (77 solo), one interception, six passes defended, and one fumble recovery.

On March 13, 2023, Anzalone signed a three-year, $18.75 million contract extension with the Lions. In the 2023 season, Anzalone finished with three sacks, 129 total tackles (85 solo), six passes defended, and one fumble recovery in 16 games and starts. In his third season with the Lions, Anzalone was selected as a 2024 NFL Pro Bowl alternate.

In the 2024 season Anzalone suffered a broken left forearm in the Week 11's 52-6 victory against the Jacksonville Jaguars. Expected to miss 6-8 weeks due to the injury, he was placed on injured reserve on November 18 with hopes of returning in the post-season. Prior to the injury, Anzalone totaled 56 stops, including seven tackles for loss, and four pass deflections. He was activated for the regular season finale on January 4, 2025.

=== Tampa Bay Buccaneers ===
On March 12, 2026, Anzalone signed a two-year, $17 million contract with the Tampa Bay Buccaneers. In Week 8 against the Atlanta Falcons, he posted two interceptions, six tackles, two passes defensed and one tackle for loss in the 16-0 blowout victory, earning him his first NFC Defensive Player of the Week honor of his career.

== NFL career statistics ==
Legend
**Bold**	Career high

=== Regular season ===
Year	Team	Games		Tackles					Interceptions						Fumbles				
Year	Team	GP	GS	Cmb	Solo	Ast	Sck	TFL	Int	Yds	Avg	Lng	TD	PD	FF	Fum	FR	Yds	TD
2017	NO	4	4	16	11	5	1.0	1	0	0	0.0	0	0	1	0	0	0	0	0
2018	NO	16	7	59	45	14	2.0	3	1	2	2.0	2	0	2	**3**	0	0	0	0
2019	NO	2	0	7	7	0	1.0	1	0	0	0.0	0	0	0	0	0	0	0	0
2020	NO	16	9	41	22	19	0.0	3	0	0	0.0	0	0	0	0	0	0	0	0
2021	DET	14	14	78	49	29	1.0	1	1	0	0.0	0	0	7	0	0	0	0	0
2022	DET	17	17	125	77	**48**	1.5	**7**	1	4	4.0	4	0	6	0	0	**1**	0	0
2023	DET	16	16	**129**	**85**	44	**3.0**	**7**	0	0	0.0	0	0	6	0	0	**1**	0	0
2024	DET	10	10	63	43	20	1.0	**7**	0	0	0.0	0	0	5	0	0	0	0	0
2025	DET	16	16	95	52	43	2.5	4	1	14	**14.0**	**14**	0	**9**	0	0	0	0	0
2026	TB	9	9	44	19	25	1.0	2	**4**	**26**	6.5	12	0	4	0	0	0	0	0
Career		120	102	657	410	247	14.0	36	8	46	5.6	14	0	40	3	0	2	0	0

=== Postseason ===
Year	Team	Games		Tackles					Interceptions						Fumbles				
Year	Team	GP	GS	Cmb	Solo	Ast	Sck	TFL	Int	Yds	Avg	Lng	TD	PD	FF	Fum	FR	Yds	TD
2018	NO	2	1	3	1	2	0.0	0	0	0	0.0	0	0	0	0	0	0	0	0
2020	NO	2	2	9	5	**4**	0.0	0	0	0	0.0	0	0	0	0	0	0	0	0
2023	DET	3	3	**23**	**19**	**4**	0.0	**2**	0	0	0.0	0	0	0	0	0	0	0	0
2024	DET	1	1	13	12	1	0.0	**2**	0	0	0.0	0	0	0	0	0	0	0	0
Career		8	7	48	37	11	0.0	4	0	0	0.0	0	0	0	0	0	0	0	0

== Personal life ==
Anzalone is of Italian descent, and was born in Wyomissing, Pennsylvania. Anzalone is a Christian. He is married to Lindsey Anzalone, who is also a Christian. The couple has three children.
