= Miami Coral Park Senior High School =

Location
- 8865 SW 16th St; Miami, Florida 33165; United States; 25°45′22″N 80°20′27″W

Information
- Type: Public secondary
- Motto: Esse Quam Videri (To be, rather than to seem to be)
- Established: 1963
- School district: Miami-Dade County Public Schools
- Principal: Scott Weiner
- Staff: 94.00 (FTE)
- Grades: 9–12
- Enrollment: 2,191 (2023–2024)
- Average class size: 34
- Student to teacher ratio: 23.31
- Campus: Suburban
- Colors: Gold, White, and Navy
- Mascot: Ramsy the Ram
- Newspaper: The Rampage
- Yearbook: Arieon
- Website: mcpshs.net

Miami Coral Park Senior High School is a secondary school located in the Westchester census-designated place of Miami-Dade County, Florida, United States. It is a part of Miami-Dade County Public Schools.

== History ==
The school was opened in 1963. It was the first school with air conditioning in South Florida.

Coral Park’s athletic rival is Southwest Miami Senior High School.

== Demographics ==
Miami Coral Park High School is 93% Hispanic, 2% Black non-Hispanic, 4% White non-Hispanic and 1% unknown, as of 2011.

== Notable alumni ==
- Jessica Aguirre (born Jessica Collazo), TV news anchor
- Rafael Anchia, member of Texas House of Representatives District 103
- Steven Bauer (AKA Rocky Echevarria), actor
- Gio Benitez, American broadcast journalist
- Mindy Kirsch Brown, Broward County Circuit Court Judge
- José Canseco, former professional baseball player
- Ozzie Canseco, former MLB player
- Alex Castellanos, MLB player
- Janet Dacal, Broadway actress and singer, known for her role as Carla in In the Heights
- Orestes Destrade, former professional baseball player
- Lili Estefan, TV talk show host
- Alex Ferrer, Circuit Court Judge, TV personality
- Steve Foucault, former MLB pitcher
- Joe Geller, Former Florida State Representative and current Miami-Dade School Board member
- Steven Geller, Former Florida Senate Minority Leader and Broward County Mayor, current Broward County Commissioner
- Pedro Gomez, TV sports reporter
- Pete Gonzalez, NFL quarterback
- Mel Gorham (born Marilyn Schnier), actress
- Luis Martinez, MLB player
- Alex Marvez, former president, Pro Football Writers of America
- Luis Montanez, class of 2000; MLB player
- Elsa Murano (born Elsa Casales), 23rd president of Texas A&M University and former undersecretary for food safety at US Dept. of Agriculture
- Zach Neto, Major League Baseball player for the Los Angeles Angels organization
- Danny Pino, actor
- Pitbull (born Armando Christian Perez), rap musician
- Danny Ramirez, actor
- Steven Reinemund, former chairman of the board and CEO of PepsiCo
- Sean Rodriguez, Major League Baseball player for the Philadelphia Phillies organization
- Tessie Santiago, actress
- Barry Smith, former NFL wide receiver
- Eric Soderholm, former MLB infielder
- Nelson Vargas, former MLS and USMNT forward

== See also ==
- Miami-Dade County Public Schools
- Education in the United States
