= Reading Central Catholic High School =

Private Catholic school in Pennsylvania, U.S.

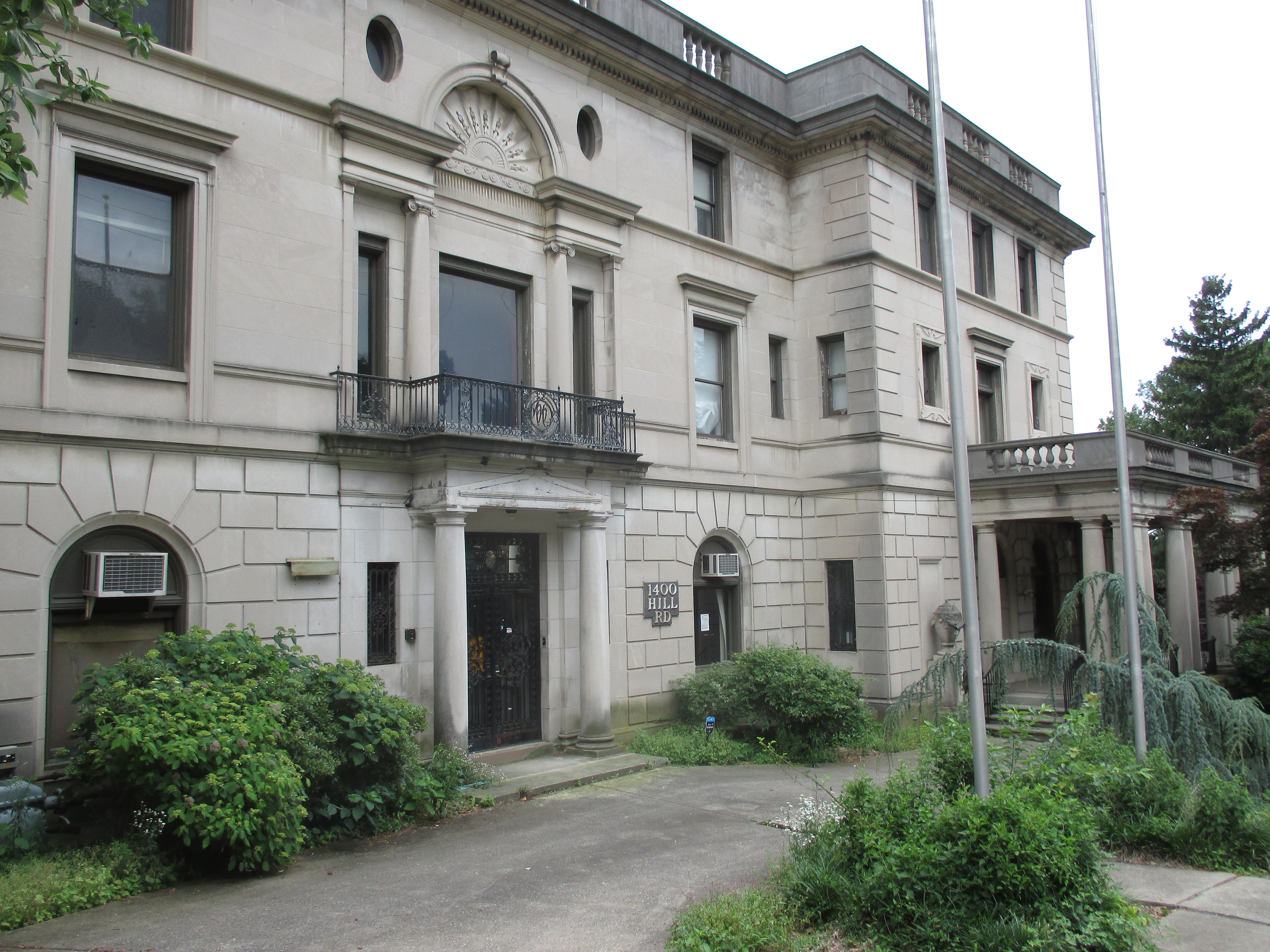
- The site of the former Reading Central Catholic High School in July 2022

Location
- 1400 Hill Road; Reading, Pennsylvania, (Berks County) 19602; United States; 40°20′3″N 75°54′36″W

Information
- Type: Private, coeducational
- Motto: Excelsior (Ever upward)
- Religious affiliation: Roman Catholic
- Established: 1939
- Closed: 2011 (Merged into Berks Catholic High School)
- CEEB code: 394-140
- Grades: 9-12
  - Grade 9: 80
  - Grade 10: 72
  - Grade 11: 65
  - Grade 12: 70
- Colors: Red and white
- Slogan: Rooted in Tradition. Committed to the Future.
- Mascot: Cardinal
- Team name: Cardinals
- Accreditation: Middle States Association of Colleges and Schools
- Yearbook: Centralma

Reading Central Catholic High School (more completely, Monsignor Bornemann Memorial Central Catholic High School of Reading, Pennsylvania) was a small Roman Catholic high school located at 1400 Hill Road in Reading, Pennsylvania. It was in the Roman Catholic Diocese of Allentown.

The school was at the intersection of Hill Road and Clymer Street. Eckert Avenue was on the 'back' side of the school. An alley completed the school's block.

== History ==
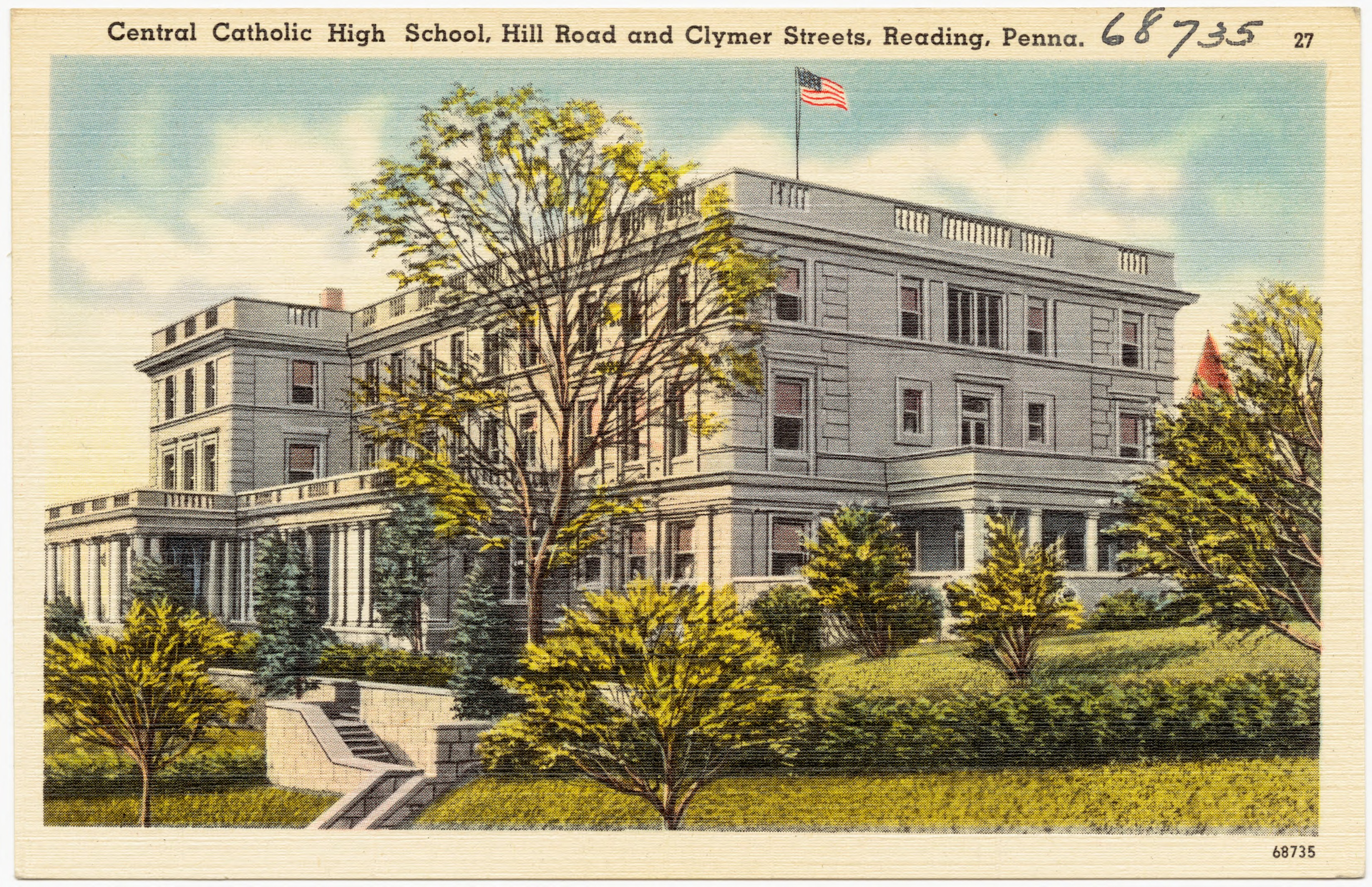

The last building used for Reading Central Catholic High School consisted of what was William H. Luden's "Bon-Air" mansion. William H. Luden was the founder of Luden's throat drops. It is also stated that a resident ghost resides in the mansion. The Luden's mansion eventually became Reading Central Catholic High School in 1939 with an initial class of 75 students, and an addition was made to the building in 1941, bringing it to its current size. Plans were made in 2008 to build a new school on land purchased by the Diocese of Allentown but were eventually canceled. Bishop John Barres of the Diocese of Allentown ordered a survey of the financial sustainability of two Catholic high schools within Berks county, and decided to close Central Catholic and Holy Name High School, creating an entirely new school. Following the 2010–2011 academic year, the Diocese of Allentown closed both Holy Name High School and Reading Central Catholic High School. The Diocese then established a new secondary school, Berks Catholic High School, which officially opened on July 1, 2011, on the site of the former Holy Name High School.

== Facilities ==
=== Football stadium ===
The Cardinals played football in a 20-acre complex located at 3850 St Lawrence Ave in St Lawrence, Pennsylvania. The land was donated to the school by Dominic Mauer. The stadium opened in 1948.

On September 3, 1976, dedication of new bleachers on the visitors' side at the athletic field in St. Lawrence took place before the home football opener against Reading High. The bleachers approximately doubled the seating capacity at the field to nearly 4,000. The home side bleachers were replaced, and the locker room building was expanded in 1969. A new lighting system was installed in 1975.

The Central Catholic Boosters (parents of CCHS students) volunteered to maintain the complex. The stadium consisted of a grass football field, a cinder track, home and visitor locker rooms (with showers), a press box, a fully functioning concession stand, a practice field and adequate parking.

The stadium was originally named St Lawrence Stadium. In 2010 the stadium was renamed Vince Shemanski Stadium for CCHS longtime principal and Head football coach, Vince Shemanski.

Shemanski Stadium is now used as a secondary stadium for Berks Catholic High School. It is currently used for middle school aged programs now but was previously used for Berks Catholic's high school lacrosse and soccer programs before Berks Catholic got AstroTurf on the campus field in 2018.

=== Hill Road Gym ===
The Hill Road Gym was added to the original Luden Mansion in the early 1940s.

The court is only 38 feet wide and 72 feet long. There is not enough room for a three-point shot from the corners. (Ideal measurements set by the National Federation are 84 feet by 50 feet.)

Central Catholic played Valley Forge Military Academy on December 5, 1941, two days before Pearl Harbor, in the first game ever played in the gym. Central lost their first eight games in that gym before defeating St. Matt's of Conshohocken 40-31 for the first win in the Hill Road Gym.

From 1983 through 1999, the Central Catholic Cardinals had a .903 winning percentage in their gym, a tremendous home court advantage. Snip Easterly, the coach of the Cardinals, said: "You can never replace the atmosphere and history that the place has."

== Athletics ==
The Cardinals of Central Catholic have a strong tradition of athletic excellence. The Cards fielded both boys and girls interscholastic teams. The teams competed in the Pennsylvania Catholic Interscholastic Athletic Association (PCIAA). In the early 1970s, PCIAA schools started to join the Pennsylvania Interscholastic Athletic Association (PIAA).

=== Basketball ===
==== PCIAA Championships ====
- 1950: Class A
- 1951: Class A; Johnstown Bishop McCort defeated Reading Central Catholic 50–48 (but later the two were named co-champs as McCort was hit with some kind of a violation according to sports historian Jerry Shenk)

==== PIAA Championships ====
- 1985: Class A Champions
- 2007: Champion - Reading Central Catholic (District 3) over DuBois Central Catholic (District 9) 58–33

=== Football ===
==== District 3 Championships ====
- 1985: Class A Champions

=== Volleyball ===
District 3 Championships

- 2002: Class 1A Champions
- 2003: Class 1A Champions
- 2004: Class 1A Champions
- 2005: Class 1A Champions
- 2006: Class 1A Champions
- 2007: Class 1A Champions

== Conversion into private housing ==
On November 11, 2023, a special exception was granted to a Brooklyn-based developer Reading Hill LLC to convert the former high school into a 78-unit apartment complex. The school was already in an R-3 Residential Zoning District. The former school contains almost 80,000 square feet of interior space, including the basement and attic areas, however, the units will use only 49,000 square feet, and were designed to maximize the building’s interior without the demolition of any interior walls.
