= Wyomissing Area School District =

School district in Pennsylvania

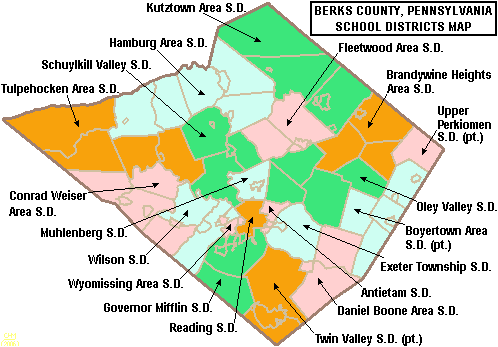
- map of public school districts Berks County showing Wyomissing Area School District

Address
- 630 Evans Ave Wyomissing, Berks County, Pennsylvania, 19610-2636; United States

Other information
- Website: wyoarea.org

Wyomissing Area School District is a diminutive, suburban, public school district located in Berks County, Pennsylvania. The Wyomissing Area School District encompasses approximately 4 square miles (10 km^{2}). The district is the smallest one operating in Berks County. According to 2000 federal census data, it serves a resident population of 12,440. By 2010, the district's population declined to 12,359 people. In 2009, the district residents’ per capita income was $35,814, while the median family income was $70,875. In the Commonwealth, the median family income was $49,501 and the United States median family income was $49,445, in 2010. By 2013, the median household income in the United States rose to $52,100.

Wyomissing Area School District operates three schools: Wyomissing Area Junior/Senior High School, West Reading Elementary Center, and Wyomissing Hills Elementary Center. The district is one of 19 public school districts operating in Berks County, Pennsylvania. The district is one of the 500 public school districts of Pennsylvania. The West Reading School District and Wyomissing School District officially merged into the Wyomissing Area School over several years finalizing the process in 1969.

== Extracurriculars ==
Wyomissing Area School District offers a wide variety of clubs, activities and an extensive sports program.

=== Sports ===
The district funds:

Boys

- Baseball - AAA
- Basketball- AAA
- Bowling - AAAA
- Cross Country - AA
- Football - AA
- Golf - AA
- Indoor Track and Field - AAAA
- Lacrosse - AAAA
- Soccer - AA
- Swimming and Diving - AA
- Tennis - AA
- Track and Field - AA
- Volleyball - AA
- Wrestling - AA

Girls

- Basketball - AA
- Bowling - AAAA
- Cross Country - AA
- Indoor Track and Field - AAAA
- Field Hockey - AA
- Lacrosse - AAAA
- Soccer (Fall) - AA
- Softball - AA
- Swimming and Diving - AA
- Girls' Tennis - AA
- Track and Field - AA
- Volleyball - AA

Junior High School Sports

Boys

- Baseball
- Basketball
- Cross Country
- Football
- Lacrosse
- Soccer
- Track and Field
- Wrestling

Girls

- Basketball
- Cross Country
- Field Hockey
- Lacrosse
- Softball
- Track and Field
- Volleyball

According to PIAA directory July 2013
