= Todd Pollack =

Former American football tight end

Profile
- Position: Tight end

Personal information
- Born: December 10, 1974 (age 51); Rye, New York, U.S.
- Listed height: 6 ft 4 in (1.93 m)
- Listed weight: 255 lb (116 kg)

Career information
- High school: Brunswick School (Greenwich, CT)
- College: Boston College (1993–1997)

Career history
- New York Giants (1998–1999)*; Indianapolis Colts (1998)*
- * Offseason or practice squad member only

Awards and highlights
- Honda Scholar Athlete Award (1996); First-team All-Big East (1997)

Todd Luce Pollack (born December 10, 1974) is an American former football tight end. Born in Rye, New York, he attended the Brunswick School in Greenwich, Connecticut. He played college football for the Boston College Eagles from 1993 to 1997. As a junior, he received the Honda Scholar Athlete Award as the outstanding student athlete in NCAA Division I football. As a senior, he was selected as the first-team tight end on the 1997 All-Big East Conference football team. In four years at Boston College, he tallied 77 receptions for 743 yards and eight touchdowns. He also spent time in pre-seasons and on taxi squads with the New York Giants and Indianapolis Colts in 1998 and 1999.
