= Bob Kindred =

American modern jazz musician

- Birth name: Robert Hamilton Kindred
- Born: May 11, 1940; Lansing, Michigan, U.S.
- Died: August 15, 2016 (aged 76); Nashville, Tennessee, U.S.
- Genres: Jazz
- Occupations: Musician; educator
- Instruments: Tenor saxophone; clarinet
- Years active: c. 1957–2016
- Spouse: Anne Phillips

Robert Hamilton Kindred (May 11, 1940 – August 15, 2016) was an American jazz tenor saxophone player, composer and educator.

== Life and career ==
Robert Hamilton Kindred was born on 11 May 1940 in Lansing, Michigan, United States. He grew up in the suburbs of Philadelphia and initially learned clarinet; he later played alto saxophone in the Philadelphia Youth Jazz Band under the direction of James DePreist. At 17, he joined Pennsylvania Sixpence, a band that played swing and Dixieland jazz, touring Europe and performing at various venues on the East Coast. After graduating from college, Kindred left the music business and worked as a businessman.

He eventually returned to playing saxophone through his encounter with Phil Woods and embraced modern jazz. He studied under Woods, played in the local jazz scene in Philadelphia, and toured in subsequent years with musicians from the soul jazz genre such as Groove Holmes, Charles Earland, and Jimmy McGriff. He later became a member of the Glenn Miller ghost band and performed as a soloist with Woody Herman, appearing with him at Carnegie Hall in New York City in 1975.

Under his own name, he released several albums starting in the 1980s, including the 2010 album Blue Moon (Venus Records), produced by Todd Barkan, featuring a rhythm section of George Mraz, Ben Riley, and John Di Martino, which included jazz standards such as "Body and Soul", "Do Nothing till You Hear from Me", "If You Could See Me Now", and "In a Sentimental Mood". Together with his wife, singer Anne Phillips, he wrote Bending Towards the Light – A Jazz Nativity. He worked as a music educator, teaching at workshops for the International Art of Jazz, Festival Jazz, and the Smithsonian Jazz Repertory Company. Since the early 1990sm, Kindred also participated in jazz and cabaret workshops in Ketchikan, Alaska, and performed at the town's jazz festival. Together with his wife, in 2010, he was recognized as an honorary citizen of Ketchikan for his educational work and contributions to local jazz music.

Bob Kindred died on August 15, 2016 in Nashville, Tennessee. He was 76 years old.

== Discography ==
- That Kindred Spirit – Bob Kindred With Strings (Conawago)
- Bending Towards the Light – A Jazz Nativity: Bob Kindred et al. (Conawago, 1993)
- Playin' in the Yard (Jazzmania, 1992), with Gene Bertoncini, Steve Gilmore, John Kaye
- Hidden Treasures (Conawago, 1994)
- Gentle Giant of the Tenor Sax (Mapleshade, 2001)
- Live at Cafe Loup – The Bob Kindred Trio (Conawago, 2005)
- Nights of Boleros and Blues (Venus, 2006)
- Your Place Or Mine (Conawago, 2011)
