= Holy Name High School (Reading, Pennsylvania) =

Location
- 955 East Wyomissing Boulevard; Reading, (Berks County), Pennsylvania 19611; United States; 40°19′25″N 75°56′47″W

Information
- Type: Private, Coeducational
- Motto: In Hoc Vinces (In this you will conquer)
- Religious affiliation: Roman Catholic
- Established: 1964
- Status: Merged with Reading Central Catholic High School
- Closed: 2011
- Grades: 9-12
- Colors: Navy Blue and White
- Slogan: Learning to change the world...
- Athletics: Approx. 25 Varsity sports
- Sports: basketball football soccer tennis lacrosse golf
- Mascot: Blue Jays
- Rival: Wyomissing Area High School; Reading Central Catholic High School
- Accreditation: Middle States Association of Colleges and Schools
- Newspaper: The Holy Name Herald
- Yearbook: Vexillum
- Website: http://www.gohnhs.org

Holy Name High School was a four-year comprehensive coeducational Roman Catholic preparatory/secondary school located in Reading, Pennsylvania. It was approved and accredited by the Middle States Association of Colleges and Secondary Schools, the Commonwealth of Pennsylvania, and the Diocese of Allentown. The school's athletic rivals included Wyomissing Area High School and Reading Central Catholic High School.

Following the 2010-2011 Academic Year, the Diocese of Allentown closed both Holy Name High School and Reading Central Catholic High School. The Diocese then established a new secondary school, Berks Catholic High School, which officially opened on July 1, 2011, on the site of the former Holy Name High School.

== History ==
Holy Name High School traced its inception to St. Peter’s Roman Catholic Church located in Reading. Founded in 1752, St. Peter’s established its parish elementary school with the approval of Bishop John Neumann in 1859. By 1911, the parish high school was established, with the first graduating class receiving diplomas in 1914.

With the formation of the Roman Catholic Diocese of Allentown in 1961, Bishop Joseph McShea realized the demand for additional high school facilities in Berks County, as well as other parts of the Diocese. Subsequently, he inaugurated a massive building campaign which culminated in the construction of three new high schools: Bethlehem Catholic High School in Bethlehem, Marian High School in Tamaqua, and Holy Name High School in Reading

The land on which Holy Name was situated is located in southwest Reading, near the city's border with the borough of West Reading. The original tract of land comprised 35.6 acres (144,000 m^{2}) in all and is bounded on the north by Joan Terrace, on the east by the Swartz Tract (presently occupied by Baldwin Hardware (a division of Black and Decker), on the south by East Wyomissing Boulevard, and on the west by Parkside Drive South.

On Sunday, August 30, 1964, Holy Name High School was dedicated by His Excellency The Most Reverend Egidio Vagnozzi, D.D., Apostolic Delegate to the United States. The name of the school was chosen as a tribute to the Holy Name Societies in the Allentown Diocese, who, acting on behalf of the Bishop, campaigned for the funds with which to build the high school.

When Holy Name opened its doors in September 1964 (St. Peter’s High School closed its doors permanently in June 1964), the faculty included three Diocesan Priests, one Benedictine Priest, six Immaculate Heart Sisters, three Sisters of St. Francis, three Bernardine Sisters, and seven Lay Teachers. The Reverend Richard J. Loeper, a native of Reading, was appointed the first Principal of Holy Name. The student body numbered 566, Grades 9 through 12. The first graduating class numbered 64.

In June 1979, the Oblates of St. Francis de Sales were invited by Bishop McShea to become part of the administration and staff of Holy Name High School, replacing the Diocesan priests currently on the staff.

In 1986, with the financial assistance of the Diocese of Allentown, through the Forward With Christ Program, an addition was constructed adjacent to the gymnasium. Included in this addition are a ticket booth for athletic and social events, a weight room and two storage rooms.

In March 1995, it was announced that the Oblates would be leaving Holy Name High School and that Sister Joseph Eleanor Murphy, IHM, would be the new Principal.

As the result of a major capital campaign, a renovation and construction project was undertaken in the spring of 1997, which would be completed in several different phases over the next few years. The project resulted in a complete state-of-art computer wing, an enlarged library equipped with computers, a new administrative wing, a new auditorium with seating for approximately 800 guests, a weight room, a television studio, a new athletic complex consisting of tennis courts, baseball and softball fields, field hockey field, a football field which also serves as a soccer field, and an all-weather track. In addition, the parking facilities doubled in size.

During the summer of 2003, Holy Name elected to adopt the President/Principal model of school administration. The Reverend Robert T. Finlan was named the school's first president and Mr. Keith Laser was appointed principal. In 2007, the Reverend John Frink became Holy Name's second president.

The school had state of the art facilities. The campus had four computer laboratories with 30 computers in each, including one with 25 Apple iMacs; SMART technology was available in every classroom; Elmo document cameras were available; the campus had a fiber optic cable connection to the Internet in addition to being wireless; all teachers had Apple Macbook laptop computers; parents could check their children's grades, attendance, and discipline online; and a wide variety of cutting-edge software applications were available as tools for faculty and students.

Following a comprehensive study on enrollment trends and the needs of the county, both Holy Name High School and Reading Central Catholic High School closed their doors on June 30, 2011. A new Diocesan secondary school, Berks Catholic High School, officially opened on July 1, 2011, on the site of the former Holy Name High School.

== Academics ==
Holy Name offered a core curriculum around English, Mathematics, Foreign Languages, Sciences, Social Studies, and Theology. Advanced Placement courses were available once the student was at least a Junior. AP courses in English, Calculus, Statistics, Physics, Biology, Chemistry, and Western European History were offered.

Students had access to over 200 courses offered by the Virtual High School.

== Alma Mater ==
"Above the rest there rises high,
A spirit strong and true.
For alma mater do we vie-
All hail the white and blue.
We treasure all the memories,
The friends, the joys and tears,
and many other revelries we'll cherish through the years.

Your brotherhood, integrity, your honor goals and fame.
To thee, we pledge our loyalty:
We hail thee, Holy Name!

Above the rest there rises high,
A spirit strong and true.
For alma mater do we vie-
All hail the white and blue!
We treasure all the memories,
The friends, the joys and tears,
And many other revelries we'll cherish through the years."
