= Berks Catholic High School =

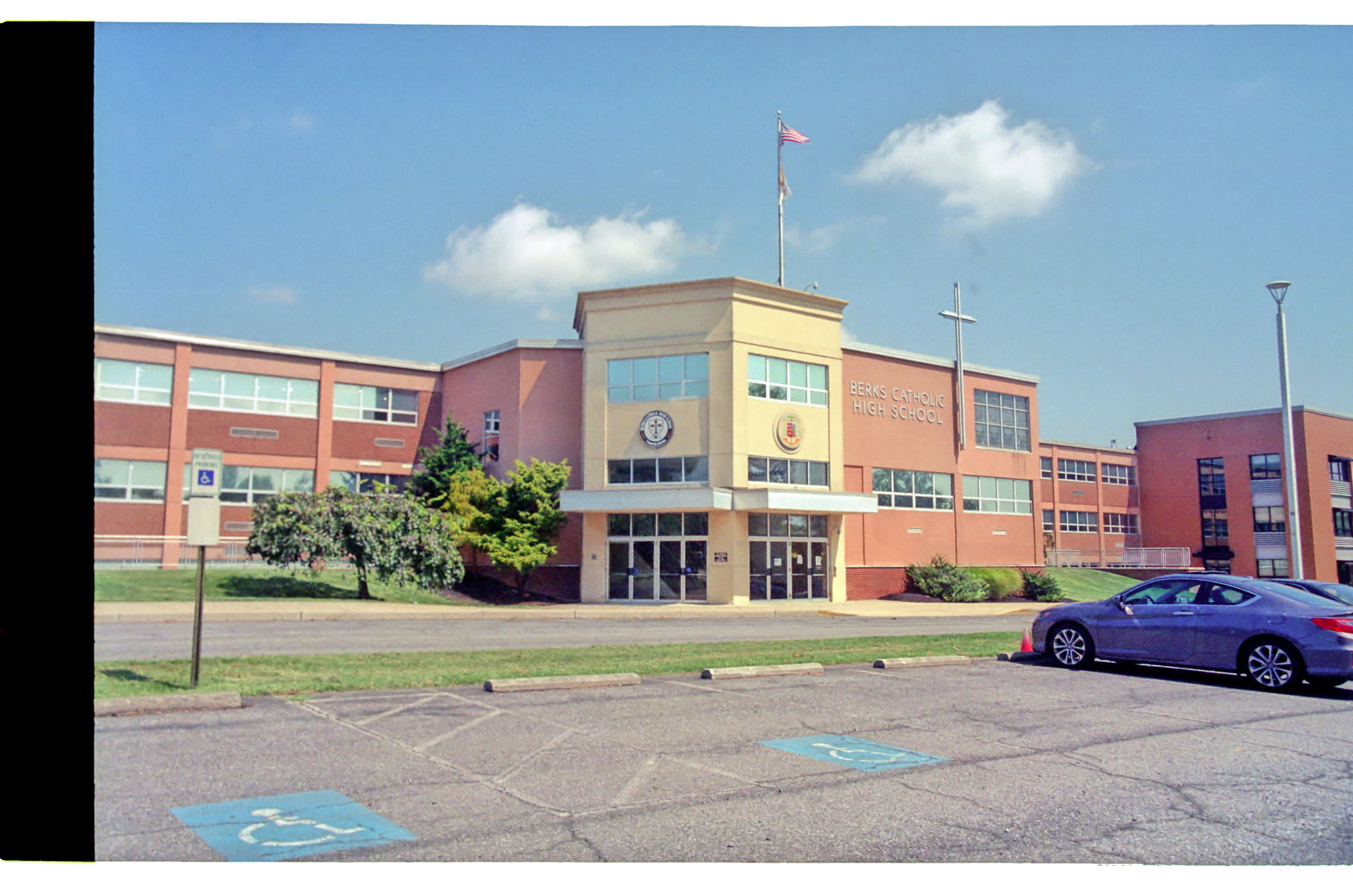
- Berks Catholic High School in August 2021

Location
- 955 East Wyomissing Boulevard; Reading, (Berks County), Pennsylvania 19611; United States; 40°19′25″N 75°56′47″W

Information
- Type: Private, Coeducational
- Motto: Unum in Christo (One in Christ)
- Religious affiliation: Roman Catholic
- Established: 2011
- Authority: Roman Catholic Diocese of Allentown
- CEEB code: 394-147
- Principal: John Petruzzelli
- Chaplain: Fr. Matthew Kuna
- Grades: 9-12
- Colors: Black and gold
- Fight song: Victory March (instrumental only)
- Mascot: Saint Bernard
- Team name: Saints
- Rival: Wyomissing Area Junior/Senior High School
- Accreditation: Middle States Association of Colleges and Schools
- Publication: The Trinity
- Yearbook: The Sanctus
- Website: www.berkscatholic.org

Berks Catholic High School is a four-year comprehensive coeducational Roman Catholic preparatory secondary school located in Reading, Pennsylvania, in the United States. It was formed out of a merger of Holy Name High School and Reading Central Catholic High School in 2011. It is approved and accredited by the Middle States Association of Colleges and Secondary Schools, the Commonwealth of Pennsylvania, and the Roman Catholic Diocese of Allentown.

== History ==
Following the 2010-2011 academic year, the Diocese of Allentown under Bishop John Barres closed both Holy Name High School and Reading Central Catholic High School. The Diocese then established Berks Catholic High School, which officially opened on July 1, 2011, on the site of the former Holy Name High School.

The school's first Principal was Tony Balistere from 2011 until 2019 after his promotion to a diocesan job in Allentown. Alice Einolf was principal for the 2019–2020 and 2020–2021 academic years during the COVID-19 pandemic during which many months of school instruction were online. Following Einoff, Bill Hess was head of school for two academic years before the current principal, John Petruzzelli, began in the position.

In the late 2010s, Berks Catholic had capacity issues since the school could not support the number of students attending. A $9 million expansion project was completed by the beginning of the 2018 school year to fix this issue.

== Students ==
The average SAT score is 1160. The School is 53% female and 47% male. The racial makeup of the school is 61.3% Caucasian, 25% Hispanic, 2.9% Asian, and 2.5% African American with the rest of the student population being of other races or international students. The colleges with the highest matriculation rate are Penn State, Temple University, The University of Pittsburgh, Drexel University, St. Joseph’s University, Alvernia University, and West Chester University. Between 94 and 100 percent of students at Berks Catholic choose to attend college after graduating.

== Education ==
Berks Catholic offers advanced placement courses.

== Athletics ==
=== Boys ===
- Bowling
- Basketball
- Baseball
- Football
- Golf
- Lacrosse
- Soccer
- Tennis
- Track and field
- Volleyball
- Wrestling

=== Girls ===
- Basketball
- Bowling
- Cheerleading (fall and winter)
- Field hockey
- Golf
- Lacrosse
- Softball
- Soccer
- Tennis
- Track and Field
- Volleyball

Berks Catholic’s only win in a state championship for a team sport was in girls volleyball in 2015.

== Saints football ==
=== Playoff appearances and history ===
The Berks Catholic football program was formed in 2011 with a merger of the Holy Name Blue Jays and the Central Catholic Cardinals, former cross-town rivals. The Blue Jays’ head Coach, Rick Keeley, became the coach of the Saints. Keeley retired from his coaching position following the 2023 season. In its existence the program has enjoyed much success. The Saints’ first appearance in the playoffs was in their second year of play in 2012, they appeared again in the years 2013, 2014, 2015, 2016, 2017, 2018, 2019, and 2021. They have only missed playoffs twice as of November 2021, in their first year and during the COVID-19 pandemic in 2020, where the criteria for choosing a playoff team was different. After Rick Keeley’s retirement in 2023, Dave Stahler became coach of the Saints.

=== Championships and awards ===
Berks Catholic has won the PIAA District III championship a total of four times, twice in their time spent in AA in 2013 and in 2015 against local rival Wyomissing and twice in AAAA in 2016 and 2017. They were coached by Rick Keeley from the teams inception in 2011 until 2023. During his time as coach, Keeley won Eastern PA Football’s 4-A coach of the year award in 2016.

=== Rivalries ===
Berks Catholic’s historic rival in athletics is the Wyomissing Spartans, both Berks County football powerhouses. This began as one of Holy Name’s two rivalries, the other impossible to carry on the tradition of during the forming of the new school because the other rival was the school they were merging with, Central Catholic. The series is called the Backyard Brawl and it was played annually from 2011 to 2019. The Keeley-Wolfram trophy (named after each team’s coach) was introduced in 2012 and memorializes the matchup. The Spartans lead in trophy wins but the Saints lead the overall series 6-5 thanks to the times the Spartans and Saints met in the playoffs before the Saints joined PIAA AAAA. The meeting has not taken place in football since 2019, when Wyomissing stopped scheduling non-required matchups with Berks Catholic. The match up is set to re-commence in September 2022 due to a conference merger. In the years without the Backyard Brawl, the game between Berks Catholic and Exeter Township Senior High School was the most spirited local match up.

== Notable alumni ==
- Brandon George ‘19, Professional Football Player, Kansas City Chiefs
