= Wyomissing, Pennsylvania =

Borough in Pennsylvania, US

- Borough
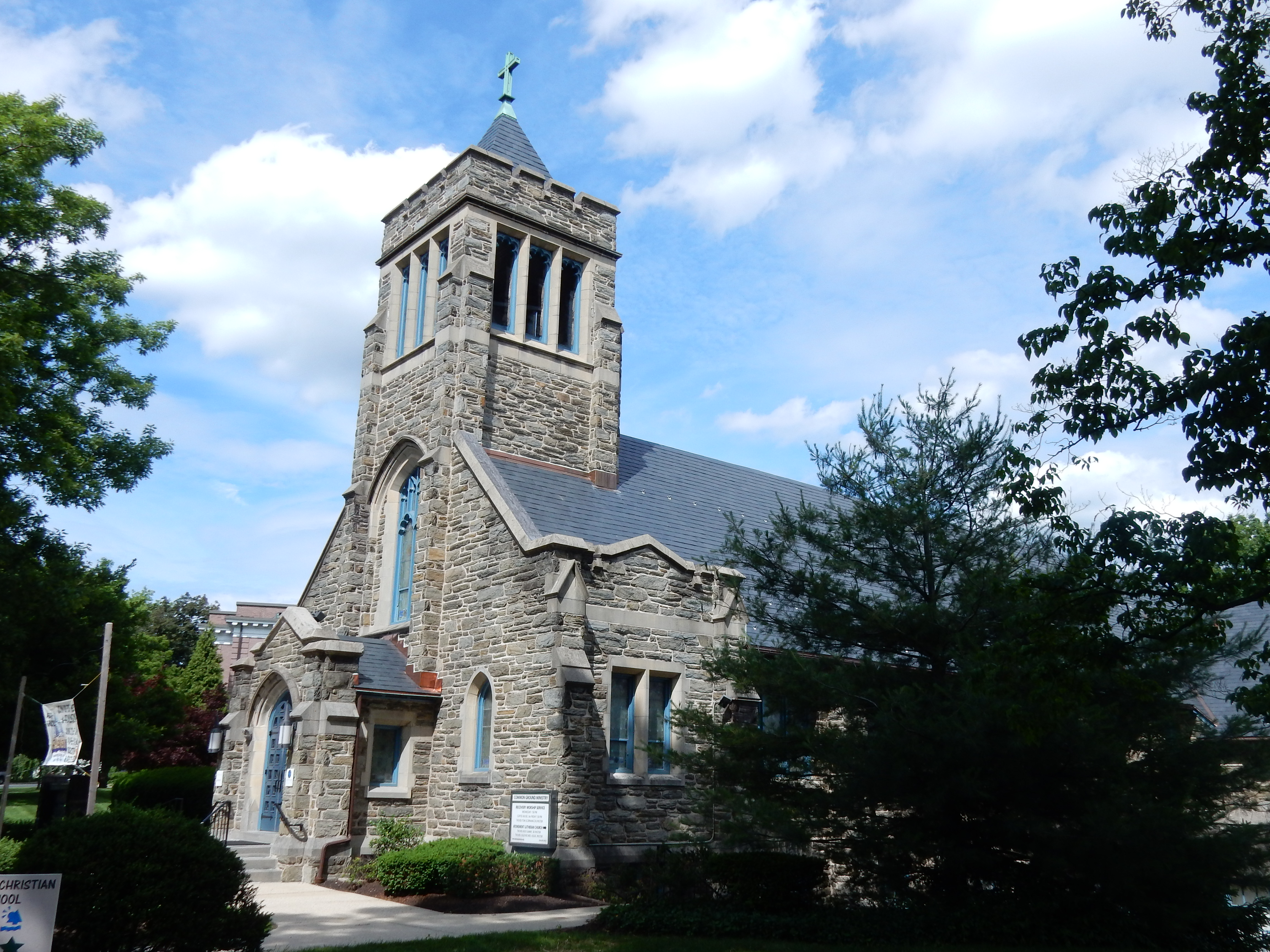
- Atonement Lutheran Church in Wyomissing in June 2015

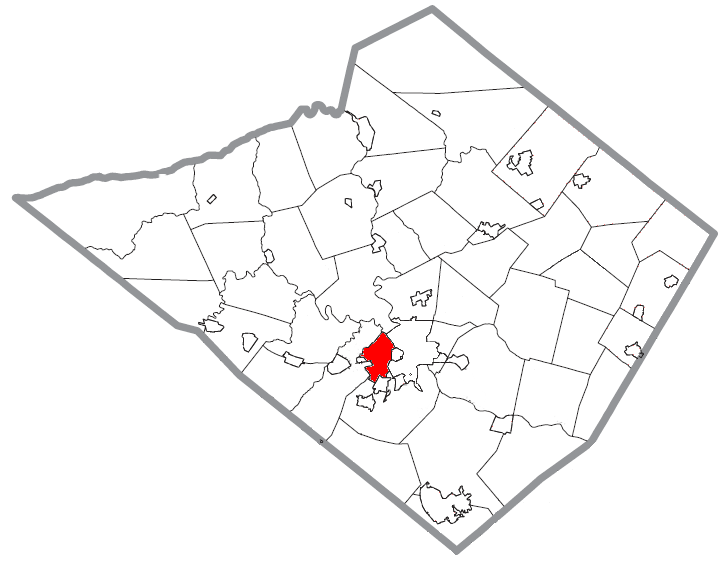
- Location of Wyomissing in Berks County, Pennsylvania

- Location of Wyomissing in Pennsylvania Wyomissing (the United States)
- Coordinates: 40°19′58″N 75°57′53″W
- Country: United States
- State: Pennsylvania
- County: Berks
- Incorporated: July 2, 1907

Government
  - Mayor: Fred Levering

Area
  - Total: 4.53 sq mi (11.73 km^{2})
  - Land: 4.51 sq mi (11.68 km^{2})
  - Water: 0.023 sq mi (0.06 km^{2})
- Elevation: 338 ft (103 m)

Population (2020)
  - Total: 11,114
  - Estimate (2022): 11,127
  - Density: 2,465/sq mi (951.7/km^{2})
- Time zone: UTC-5 (EST)
  - Summer (DST): UTC-4 (EDT)
- ZIP Code: 19610
- Area codes: 610 and 484
- FIPS code: 42-86880
- Website: www.wyomissingboro.org

Wyomissing /waɪəˈmɪsɪŋ/ is a borough in Berks County, Pennsylvania, United States, adjacent to Reading. The borough was incorporated on July 2, 1906. As of the 2020 census, the population was 11,114, compared to 10,461 at the 2010 census. The growth was significantly larger between 2000 and 2010 largely because of its merger in January 2002 with neighboring Wyomissing Hills. Wyomissing is the most populous borough in Berks County.

The borough is recognized as a Tree City USA and selected as a "Contender" for the best places to live in Pennsylvania by Money magazine.

== Geography ==
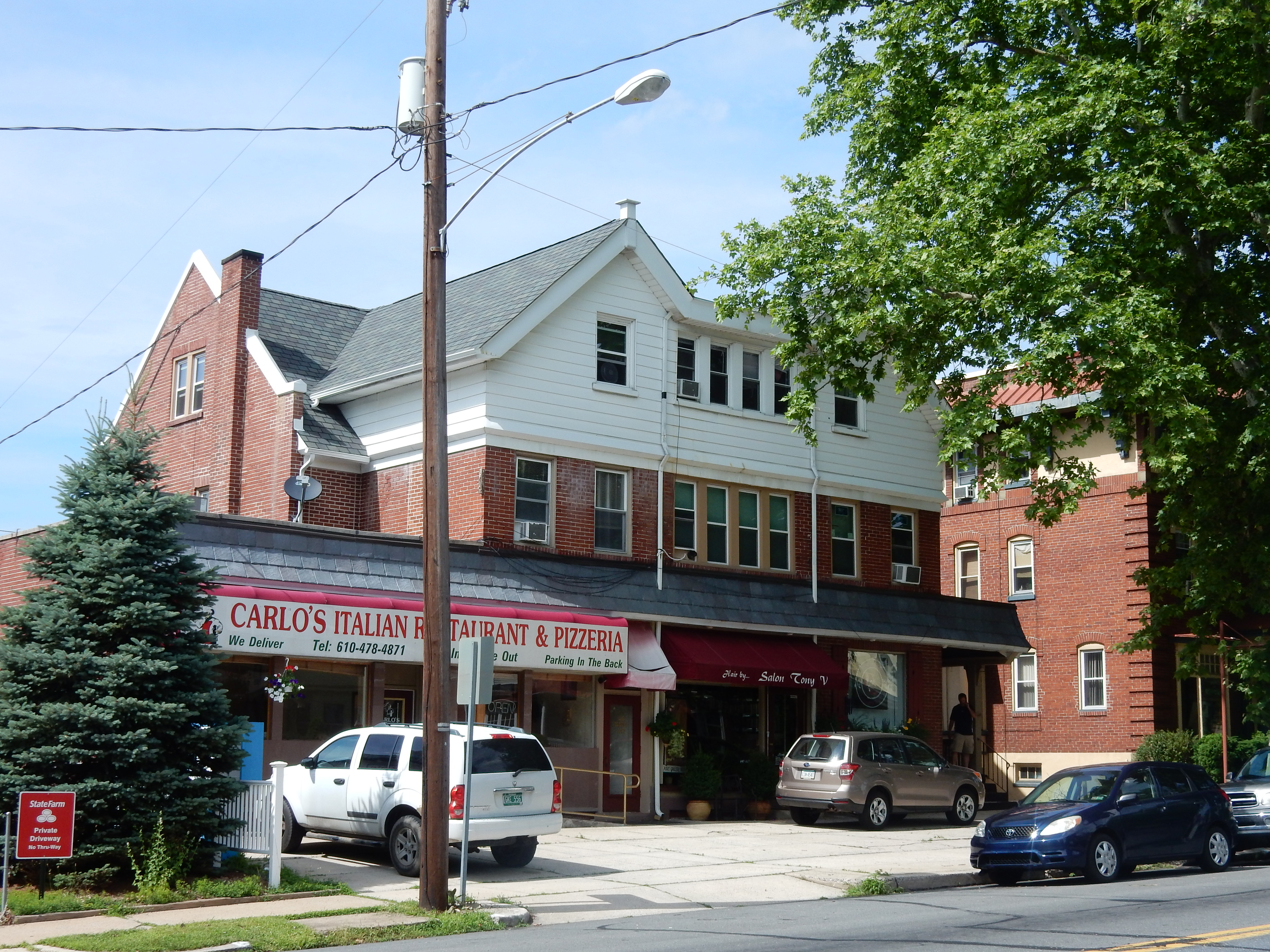
Penn Avenue in Wyomissing

Wyomissing is located in central Berks County at 40°19′58″N 75°57′53″W (40.332742, −75.964603). It is bordered by the city of Reading to the northeast and southeast, by West Reading directly to the east, by the borough of Shillington and Cumru Township to the south, by Spring Township to the west and northwest, and by Bern Township to the north. From south to north, the west side of Wyomissing is bordered by the unincorporated communities of Montrose Manor, Lincoln Park, West Wyomissing, West Lawn, Whitfield, and Colony Park. Directly to the north, in Bern Township, is the unincorporated community of Greenfields.

The northeastern boundary of Wyomissing with Reading is formed by Tulpehocken Creek and a small portion of the Schuylkill River. Wyomissing Creek flows from southwest to northeast towards the Schuylkill, through the southern part of the borough.

According to the U.S. Census Bureau, the borough has a total area of 4.50 square miles (11.65 km^{2}), of which 4.48 square miles (11.60 km^{2}) is land and 0.019 square miles (0.05 km^{2}), or 0.47 percent, is water.

In the vicinity of the Knitting Mills, formerly the Vanity Fair complex, average monthly temperatures range from 30.6 °F in January to 75.9 °F in July. The climate locally and in the surrounding area is classified by the Köppen climate classification system as hot-summer humid continental (Dfa). The local hardiness zone is 7a, bordering on 6b.

== History ==
The original inhabitants of Wyomissing are Lenape Native Americans, who lived along the banks of Wyomissing Creek. The name Wyomissing is from the Delaware language, meaning "peaceful/long fish/pike". Much of Berks County was transferred from the Native Americans to William Penn in 1685. Title to the land that much of Wyomissing is built upon was in two parcels, an eastern tract and a western tract, which were divided by a northwesterly line in the vicinity of Lake Avenue. One of the earliest industries in the area was the Evans Grist Mill. This building still stands at the corner of Old Mill Road and Old Wyomissing Road.

=== 19th century ===
In 1896, present-day Wyomissing began to take form when Reading lumber dealer Thomas P. Merritt acquired 600 acres (240 ha). Albert Thalheimer, David H. Keiser, Matthias Mengel, and Levi Walter Mengel joined Thomas R. Merrit in organizing the Reading Suburban Real Estate Company. Shortly afterwards Wyomissing Industries, manufacturer of textile machinery, was established by the firm of Thun and Janssen along the Reading Railroad just west of Van Reed Road (today named Park Road). Ferdinand Thun, Henry K Janssen, and Gustav Oberlaender became known as "The Big Three of Wyomissing Industries. Wyomissing Industries comprised Narrow Fabric Co., Textile Machine Works and Berkshire Knitting Mills. This spurred development, and soon there were many developers working to build Wyomissing.

In 1904 and 1905, Thun and Janssen called town meetings to discuss setting up a borough government. Eventually petitions were filed with the courts for the establishment of a borough, signed by 61 resident property owners and 39 non-resident property owners.

=== 20th century ===
On July 2, 1906, the court issued the final decree of the incorporation of the Borough of Wyomissing. Between 1906 and the 1940s, several additional tracts of land were annexed to the borough from Spring and Cumru townships. However, 1949–1950 saw the largest annexation, with the addition of the area north of the railroad tracts known as Berkshire Heights. This drastically changed the borough map.

The borough evolved during this period from farmland to a large residential and commercial community. The last farmland worked in the borough was part of the Hartman Farm at the intersection of Woodland and Papermill roads. This land was sold into commercial development in the early 1990s. This includes the area now called "Woodmill Commons".

In 2002, Wyomissing merged with its smaller neighbor, Wyomissing Hills.

== Economy ==
Wyomissing is a thriving commercial office and retail center, in large part due to its proximity to Reading and its highway access. The Berkshire Mall is located in Wyomissing along with several other large shopping centers with their retail giants and restaurants. As crime soared in Reading throughout the 1990s, companies and corporations relocated from the city to newer, Class A office space in the borough. In addition to a suburban layout, the greater Wyomissing area is at the crossroads of U.S. Routes 422 and 222, providing immediate highway access to the rest of the greater Philadelphia and Berks County region.

Several large corporations are headquartered in Wyomissing, including Penn Entertainment, the second-largest gaming company in the U.S., Boscov's, one of the last family-owned department store chains in the nation, and Carpenter Technology Corporation. UGI and VF Corporation have major operations in the borough. Sovereign Bank was previously headquartered here. Sovereign was acquired by Santander Group, which maintains its regional office at the same location in the borough. Wyomissing has outpaced the rest of the Southeastern Pennsylvania region in job growth, registering an average job growth of 13.3% per year from 2000 to 2006. Financial giants Merrill Lynch, Goldman Sachs, and Citibank are developing data backup centers using the region's close proximity to major fiber optic lines running down the East Coast.

In 2024, Macy's opened a new store in Wyomissing at Broadcasting Square replacing a former Bed Bath & Beyond store. This is the company's first store in Berks County.

== Demographics ==
Historical population
Census	Pop.	Note	%±
1910	985		—
1920	2,062		109.3%
1930	3,111		50.9%
1940	3,320		6.7%
1950	4,187		26.1%
1960	5,044		20.5%
1970	7,136		41.5%
1980	6,551		−8.2%
1990	7,332		11.9%
2000	8,587		17.1%
2010	10,461		21.8%
2020	11,114		6.2%
U.S. Decennial Census

=== 2020 census ===
As of the 2020 census, Wyomissing had a population of 11,114. The median age was 47.0 years. 19.5% of residents were under the age of 18 and 28.1% of residents were 65 years of age or older. For every 100 females there were 91.1 males, and for every 100 females age 18 and over there were 87.5 males age 18 and over.

100.0% of residents lived in urban areas, while 0.0% lived in rural areas.

There were 4,628 households in Wyomissing, of which 25.3% had children under the age of 18 living in them. Of all households, 51.0% were married-couple households, 15.5% were households with a male householder and no spouse or partner present, and 27.5% were households with a female householder and no spouse or partner present. About 30.6% of all households were made up of individuals and 17.4% had someone living alone who was 65 years of age or older.

There were 4,918 housing units, of which 5.9% were vacant. The homeowner vacancy rate was 1.5% and the rental vacancy rate was 8.0%.

Racial composition as of the 2020 census
Race	Number	Percent
White	8,978	80.8%
Black or African American	375	3.4%
American Indian and Alaska Native	23	0.2%
Asian	463	4.2%
Native Hawaiian and Other Pacific Islander	2	0.0%
Some other race	478	4.3%
Two or more races	795	7.2%
Hispanic or Latino (of any race)	1,237	11.1%

=== 2000 census ===
As of the 2000 census, there were 8,587 people, 3,359 households, and 2,096 families residing in the borough. The population density was 2,246.0 inhabitants per square mile (867.2/km^{2}). There were 3,539 housing units at an average density of 925.7 per square mile (357.4/km^{2}). The racial makeup of the borough was 94.76% White, 1.50 percent African American, 0.07 percent Native American, 1.90 percent Asian, 0.02 percent Pacific Islander, 0.89 percent from other races, and 0.86 percent from two or more races. Hispanic or Latino of any race were 1.83 percent of the population.

There were 3,359 households, out of which 23.7 percent had children under the age of 18 living with them, 55.1 percent were married couples living together, 5.9 percent had a female householder with no husband present, and 37.6 percent were non-families. 34.1 percent of all households were made up of individuals, and 22.7 percent had someone living alone who was 65 years of age or older. The average household size was 2.23 and the average family size was 2.88.

In the borough, the population was spread out, with 18.2 percent under the age of 18, 12.6 percent from 18 to 24, 17.6 percent from 25 to 44, 22.7 percent from 45 to 64, and 28.8 percent who were 65 years of age or older. The median age was 46 years. For every 100 females there were 83.9 males. For every 100 females age 18 and over, there were 79.9 males.

The median income for a household in the borough was $54,681, and the median income for a family was $78,112. Males had a median income of $54,167 versus $34,815 for females. The per capita income for the borough was $37,313. About 1.4 percent of families and 3.4 percent of the population were below the poverty line, including 2.9 percent of those under age 18 and 5.9 percent of those age 65 or over.

== Education ==
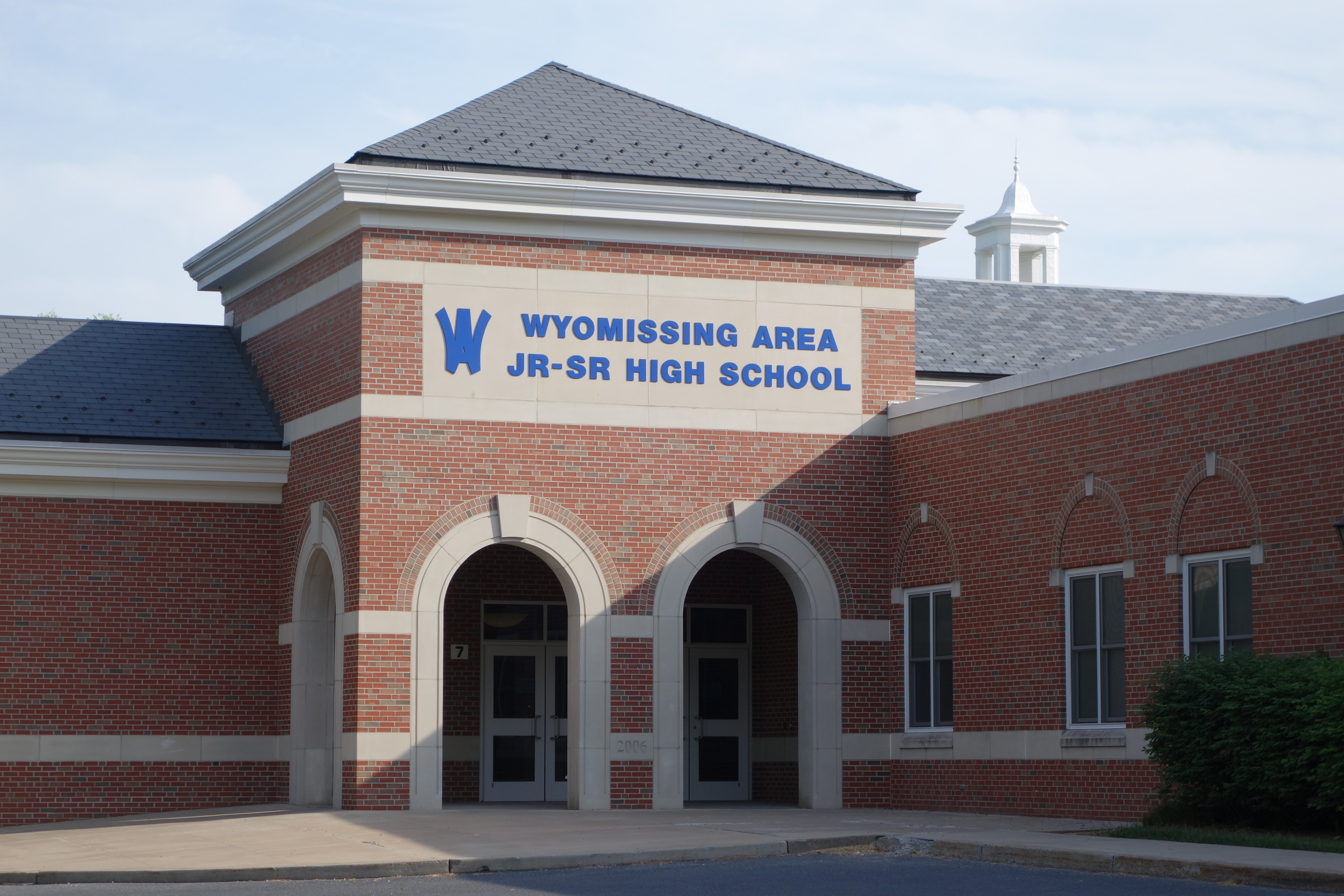
Wyomissing Area Junior/Senior High School in Wyomissing

The borough is served by the Wyomissing Area School District, which includes Wyomissing Hills Elementary Center, serving grades K–4, West Reading Elementary Center, serving grades 5–6, and Wyomissing Area Junior/Senior High School, serving grades 7–12. The Berkshire Heights portion of the borough is served by the Wilson School District.

There are several Catholic schools just outside Wyomissing that serve area students. Among them are St. Ignatius Loyola (K–8) in Spring Township and Sacred Heart (K–8) in West Reading. As of the fall of 2011, the newly formed Berks Catholic High School at 955 E Wyomissing Blvd in Reading (formerly Holy Name High School) serves students in grades 9–12.

== Government ==
Wyomissing is a borough with a council-manager form of government. The manager is Pat Brandenburg. The council consists of nine members and elects a mayor from its ranks, who is Fred Levering.

The following legislators represent the borough:

- State House: Mark M. Gillen, 128th district
- State Senate: Judy Schwank, 11th district
- US House: Chrissy Houlahan, 6th district
- US Senate: John Fetterman and Dave McCormick

== Infrastructure ==
=== Transportation ===
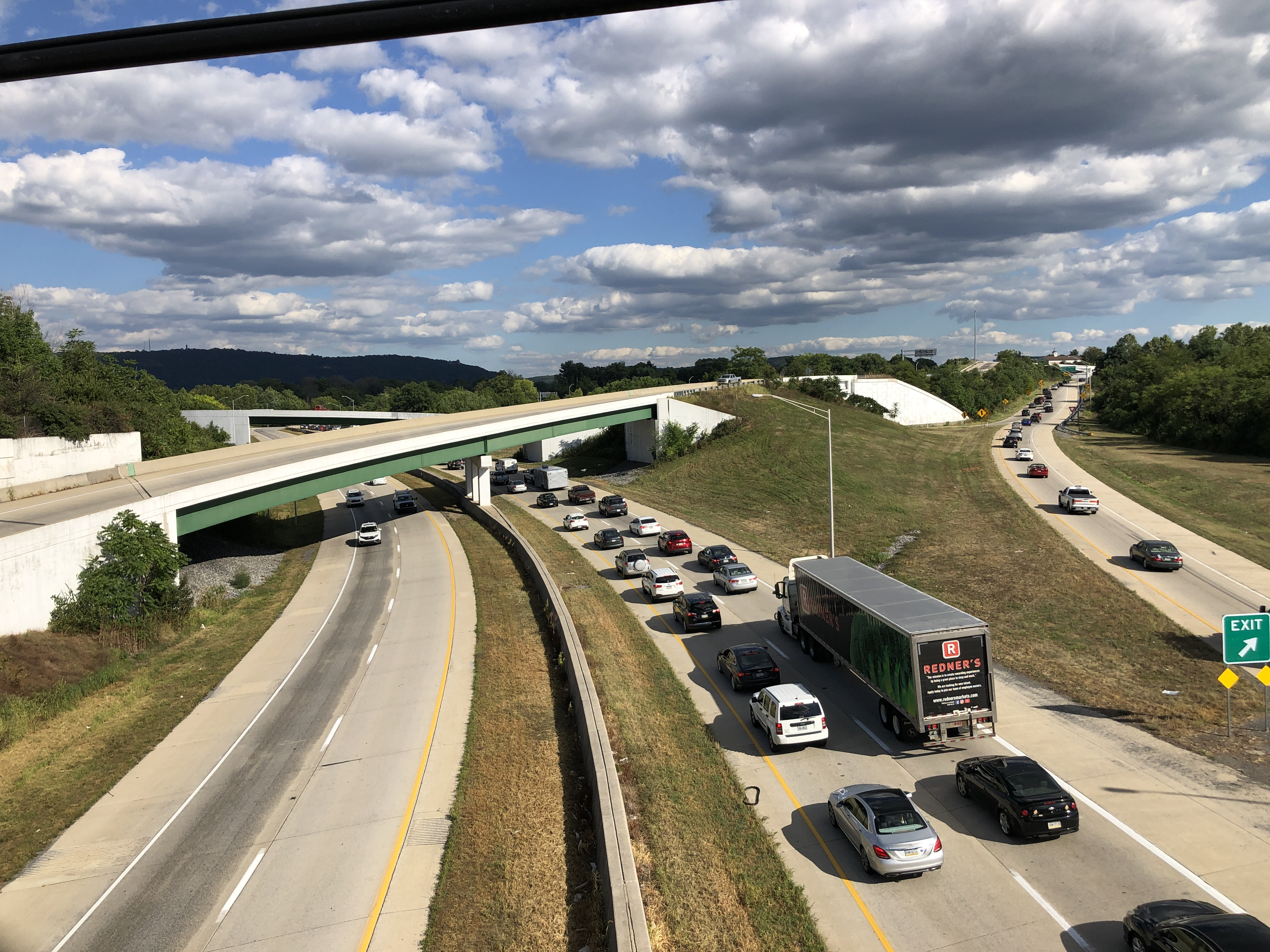
US Route 222 South at PA Route 12 and US Route 422 in Wyomissing

As of 2019, there were 59.90 miles (96.40 km) of public roads in Wyomissing, of which 9.01 miles (14.50 km) were maintained by the Pennsylvania Department of Transportation (PennDOT) and 50.89 miles (81.90 km) were maintained by the borough.

Wyomissing is located at the junction of U.S. Route 222 and U.S. Route 422, which pass concurrent through the borough on the Warren Street Bypass freeway. US 222 heads south as a freeway toward Lancaster and north as a freeway toward Allentown while US 422 heads west on Penn Avenue toward Lebanon and east on the West Shore Bypass freeway toward the central part of Reading and Pottstown. Pennsylvania Route 12 begins at US 222/US 422 in Wyomissing and continues northeast along the Warren Street Bypass toward the northern part of Reading and Pricetown. U.S. Route 422 Business passes through the center of Wyomissing on Penn Avenue, beginning at US 222/US 422 before heading east to West Reading and the central part of Reading. Other notable local roads in Wyomissing include Park Road, Paper Mill Road, State Hill Road, and Wyomissing Boulevard.

Wyomissing is served by multiple Berks Area Regional Transportation Authority (BARTA) bus routes including 12, 14, 15, and 16, which serve residential and business areas in the borough and connect the borough to the BARTA Transportation Center in Reading and other points in Berks County.

Norfolk Southern Railway (NS) operates freight trains through Wyomissing. The borough is home to the Wyomissing Junction between the Harrisburg Line running from Harrisburg to Philadelphia and the Reading Line running from Wyomissing to Bethlehem. Wyomissing was proposed to be the western terminus of a section of the Schuylkill Valley Metro (SVM) passenger rail service. The SVM project would have extended both ends of SEPTA's Manayunk/Norristown Line, with one end extended from the Philadelphia area to Berks County. The project was ultimately rejected by the Federal Transit Administration New Starts program. In 2018, a panel led by the Greater Reading Chamber Alliance pushed for an extension of SEPTA's Manayunk/Norristown Line to Reading along the existing NS line, with service terminating either at the Franklin Street Station in Reading or in Wyomissing.

=== Utilities ===
Electricity to most of Wyomissing is provided by PPL Corporation in Allentown; with the Berkshire Heights portion of the borough receiving electricity from Met-Ed, a subsidiary of FirstEnergy. Natural gas service in Wyomissing is provided by UGI Utilities. The borough's Public Works Department provides water service to most of Wyomisisng, purchasing water from the Western Berks Water Authority.

Wyomissing Hills receives water from Pennsylvania American Water, a subsidiary of American Water. Sewer service in Wyomissing is provided by the borough's Public Works Department. The borough provides trash and recycling collection for residences.

== Notable people ==
- Alex Anzalone (born 1994), professional football player, Detroit Lions
- Douglas Carter Beane, playwright
- Randy Cohen, former syndicated New York Times columnist
- Kerry Collins (born 1972), former professional football player
- Megan Gallagher (born 1960), actress
- Jon Gosselin (born 1977), reality television star
- Chad Henne (born 1985), professional football player
- Matt Lytle (born 1975), former professional football player
- Craig MacGregor (1949–2018), rock music bassist of Foghat
- Timothy Mayopoulos (born 1959), businessman and lawyer, former president and CEO of Fannie Mae
- Jillian Murray, actress
- Anne Phillips, singer, songwriter and producer
- Der Scutt (1934–2010), architect
- Taylor Swift (born 1989), singer-songwriter and 14-time Grammy Award winner
- Ross Tucker (born 1979), professional football player
