= Stevie Mitchell (basketball) =

American basketball player (born 2003)

No. 4 – Rio Grande Valley Vipers
- Position: Point guard / shooting guard
- League: NBA G League

Personal information
- Born: January 29, 2003 (age 23) Philadelphia, Pennsylvania, U.S.
- Listed height: 6 ft 3 in (1.91 m)
- Listed weight: 200 lb (91 kg)

Career information
- High school: Wilson (West Lawn, Pennsylvania)
- College: Marquette (2021–2025)
- NBA draft: 2025: undrafted
- Playing career: 2025–present

Career history
- 2025–present: Rio Grande Valley Vipers

Stevie Mitchell (born January 29, 2003) is an American professional basketball player for the Rio Grande Valley Vipers of the NBA G League. He played college basketball for the Marquette Golden Eagles.

== Early life and high school ==
Mitchell attended Wilson High School, where he averaged 22.3 points, 5.4 rebounds, 2.6 steals and 1.9 assists per game as a senior. Coming out of high school, he committed to play college basketball for the Marquette Golden Eagles over other schools such as Villanova, Temple, Saint Joseph’s, Miami, Stanford and Georgia Tech.

== College career ==
As a freshman in 2021-22, Mitchell averaged 2.8 points and 1.4 rebounds in 32 games. In 2022-23, he became a full-time starter where he made 36 starts, averaging 7.1 points, 2.9 rebounds, and 1.7 steals per game. In 2023-24, Mitchell made 33 starts, where he averaged 8.8 points, 4.1 rebounds, and 1.9 steals per game. On November 11, 2024, he dropped 17 points in a win versus Central Michigan. On January 3, 2025, Mitchell tallied 18 points in a victory over Creighton. On January 24, he scored 21 points in a victory over Villanova. On January 28, Mitchell scored a career-high 22 points in a win against Butler. For his performance during the 2024-25 season, he was named the Big East Conference scholar athlete of the year. He was also named a finalist for the Naismith defensive player of the year award. Mitchell underwent hip surgery after the season.

== Professional career ==
For the 2025–26 season, Mitchell signed with the Rio Grande Valley Vipers of the NBA G League. He also worked at wealth management company Baird & Co.
