= David Christian =

Dave or David Christian may refer to:

- David Christian (historian) (born 1946), American historian
- David A. Christian (born 1948), American Vietnam war veteran
- Dave Christian (born 1959), American ice hockey player
