= John Gilmore (American football) =

American football player (born 1979)

No. 85, 88, 89
- Position: Tight end

Personal information
- Born: September 21, 1979 (age 47); Marquette, Michigan, U.S.
- Listed height: 6 ft 5 in (1.96 m)
- Listed weight: 257 lb (117 kg)

Career information
- High school: Wilson (West Lawn, Pennsylvania)
- College: Penn State
- NFL draft: 2002: 6th round, 196th overall pick

Career history
- New Orleans Saints (2002)*; Chicago Bears (2002–2007); Tampa Bay Buccaneers (2008–2010); Pittsburgh Steelers (2011)*; New Orleans Saints (2011)
- * Offseason or practice squad member only

Career NFL statistics
- Receptions: 55
- Receiving yards: 544
- Receiving touchdowns: 6
- Stats at Pro Football Reference

John Henry Gilmore Jr. (born September 21, 1979) is an American former professional football player who was a tight end in the National Football League (NFL). He played college football for the Penn State Nittany Lions and was selected by the New Orleans Saints in the sixth round of the 2002 NFL draft.

Gilmore also played for the Chicago Bears, Tampa Bay Buccaneers and Pittsburgh Steelers. Gilmore now serves as the founder and executive director for Brandthumb Consulting Agency.

== Early life ==
Gilmore went to Wilson High School in West Lawn, Pennsylvania and was voted Wilson's 1996 male athlete of the year, Associated Press first-team All-State, and first-team all county (Berks).

== Personal ==
John Gilmore is widely known for his deep commitment to community support. Gilmore and his wife, Rebecca, reside in Tampa, Florida with their children Grayson and Lilliana.

He is represented by fellow Penn State alumnus Chafie Fields.

Gilmore earned a Bachelor of Science in recreation and parks management in 2001.

In 2010 Gilmore established the Gilmore | Henne Community Fund with Kansas City Chiefs quarterback, and fellow Wilson High School grad, Chad Henne. The Fund's mission is to revitalize parks and recreational facilities in their native Berks County, Pennsylvania. This is done through renovation, ongoing maintenance and park programming. The Fund's vision is to revitalize communities through their work on the playground. Since inception, the Fund has revitalized 7 playgrounds in Berks County.
