= David A. Christian =

American soldier in the Vietnam War

David Christian
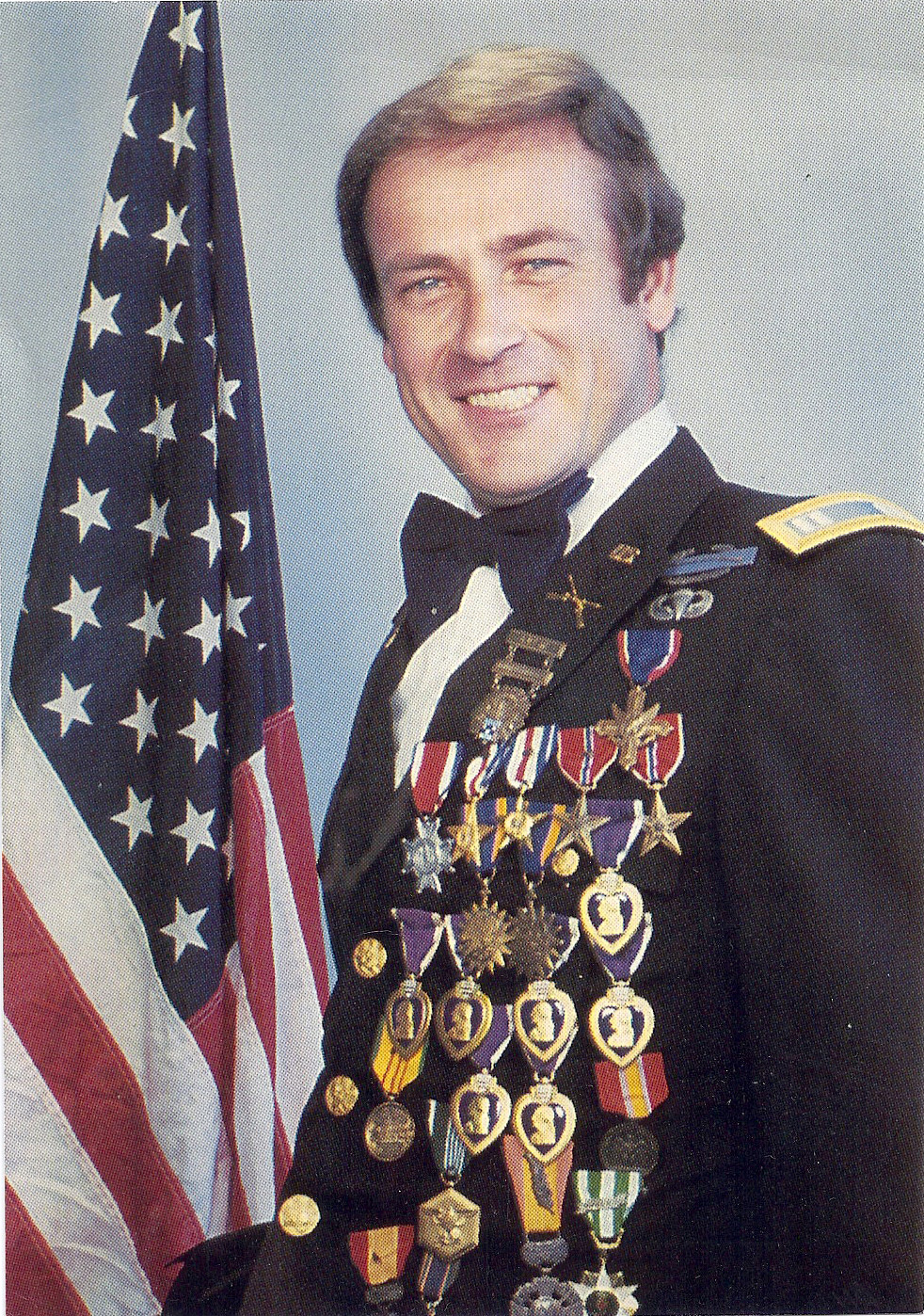
- David A. Christian
- Born: October 26, 1948 (age 77); Gainesville, Florida, U.S.
- Education: Villanova; Middlebury College (M.A.); Rutgers (J.D.)
- Military career
- Allegiance: United States
- Branch: United States Army
- Service years: 1966–1970
- Rank: Captain
- Conflicts: Vietnam War
- Awards: Distinguished Service Cross; Silver Star (2); Bronze Star Medal (2); Purple Heart (7); Air Medal (2); Army Commendation Medal; Republic of Vietnam Gallantry Cross (2)
- Website: http://davechristian.com/

David A. Christian (born October 26, 1948) is an American who served in the United States Army as a captain during the Vietnam War. While serving as a lieutenant in South Vietnam, he was wounded in action seven times and awarded several medals including the Distinguished Service Cross for extraordinary heroism. He is best known for his veterans' advocacy efforts.

In 2012, Christian was a candidate for the Republican nomination in the United States Senate election in Pennsylvania, challenging incumbent Democratic Senator Bob Casey, Jr. Christian lost in the primary election to Tom Smith.

== Early life and education ==
Christian was born in Gainesville, Florida, on October 26, 1948. He was raised in Levittown, Pennsylvania. Christian's father left the family, causing his mother to raise Christian and his three siblings alone. Christian's mother, Dorothy Christian, was a U.S. Army aide to General Douglas MacArthur in World War II.

Christian completed his high school education at Woodrow Wilson High School in 1966. He graduated on the Dean's List from Villanova University in 1972. He attended law school at Rutgers University, from 1972 to 76. Christian graduated from Rutgers Law School in 2011. Christian also attended graduate programs at Villanova, the University of Pennsylvania, Bryn Mawr College, before graduating with a master's degree in international politics from Middlebury College.

== Military career ==
=== Vietnam War ===
Christian enlisted in the United States Army in 1966 at age 17. After being rapidly promoted through the enlisted ranks to sergeant, he was admitted to the U.S. Army Officer Candidate School (OCS) and commissioned at 18 years old (making him one of the youngest officers in American history) and making Christian the youngest commissioned officer of the 20th century. Following Officer Candidate School, he completed U.S. Army Airborne School, (Parachute Jump School) and U.S. Army Special Forces ("Green Berets") training.

In 1968, he was sent to Vietnam and served with the 1st Infantry Division – 75th Rangers (Long Range Recon) doing work behind enemy lines for the Division and the 11th Armored Cavalry under Major General George Patton IV and the 1st Battalion 26th Infantry. He was awarded the Distinguished Service Cross for extraordinary heroism on October 29, 1968, and two Silver Stars (America's third highest medal for valor). In January 1969, Christian was critically burned by napalm in Vietnam and treated at hospitals there until February 20. He was then transferred to the 106 General Hospital (a division of Brooke Burn Center was established there) in Japan. He was promoted to captain (O-3) at age 20. He was medically retired from the Army at age 21.

=== Distinguished Service Cross ===
CITATION:

The President of the United States of America, authorized by Act of Congress, July 9, 1918 (amended by act of July 25, 1963), takes pleasure in presenting the Distinguished Service Cross to First Lieutenant (Infantry) David A. Christian (ASN: 0-5345884), United States Army, for extraordinary heroism in connection with military operations involving conflict with an armed hostile force in the Republic of Vietnam, while serving with Combat Support Company, 1st Battalion, 26th Infantry, 1st Brigade, 1st Infantry Division. First Lieutenant Christian distinguished himself by exceptionally valorous actions on 29 October 1968 while in charge of the lead element of a reconnaissance-in-force mission ten miles northwest of Quan Loi. During an attempt to flank enemy positions, Lieutenant Christian's nine-man unit came under heavy rocket-propelled grenade, small arms and automatic weapons fire. After firing several light antitank weapons, he led an assault on the hostile strongholds, killing three North Vietnamese and causing others to flee. As he and his comrades advanced they again received intense small arms and machine gun fire and three men were wounded. Lieutenant Christian sent the casualties and the medic to the rear, and then led his troops forward until they became pinned down within ten meters of a bunker. Disregarding his safety, he assaulted the fortification single-handedly and destroyed it with hand grenades. The communists were reinforced by approximately thirty men, forcing the reconnaissance team to take cover behind a berm. Despite the enemy's devastating fire superiority, Lieutenant Christian attacked them with two antitank weapons. He was painfully wounded in the hand, but refused medical care and returned to the berm to direct artillery fire. When friendly reinforcements arrived two hours later, he directed them to cover his left flank while he attempted to evacuate his casualties. Although wounded again by an enemy rocket-propelled grenade, he did not permit himself to be treated until the other injured men had been evacuated. Lieutenant Christian's extraordinary heroism and devotion to duty were in the highest traditions of the military service and reflect great credit on him, his unit, and the United States Army.

Headquarters, U.S. Army, Vietnam, General Orders No. 1192 (April 7, 1969)

== Post-military service ==
David Christian meets with Ronald Reagan.

Christian was elected National Commander of the Legion of Valor in 1978 and National Adjutant in 1980. He holds a lifetime Board of Directors position with the Legion of Valor. Membership of the Legion of Valor is restricted to those who have been awarded the Medal of Honor, Distinguished Service Cross, Navy Cross, or Air Force Cross.

Frustrated with how Vietnam War veterans were treated upon their return to the United States, both by the general public and the government, Christian became an advocate and veterans leader. He founded the United Vietnam Veterans Organization (UVVO), whose members joined Vietnam Veterans of America at the 1985 VVA National Convention in Detroit after UVVO dissolved.

Christian went on to serve as Regional Director of the US Department of Labor (Region 3) and then as Assistant State Director in Pennsylvania. His efforts made Pennsylvania the only State to be in compliance with establishing outreach centers. He worked with then Secretary of Labor and Industry, Charles Lieberth, and continued this program under the Reagan administration and Pennsylvania Governor Dick Thornburgh. During his tenure millions of dollars were brought into the outreach centers that helped veterans with employment and to obtain disability assistance for longer than 20 years.

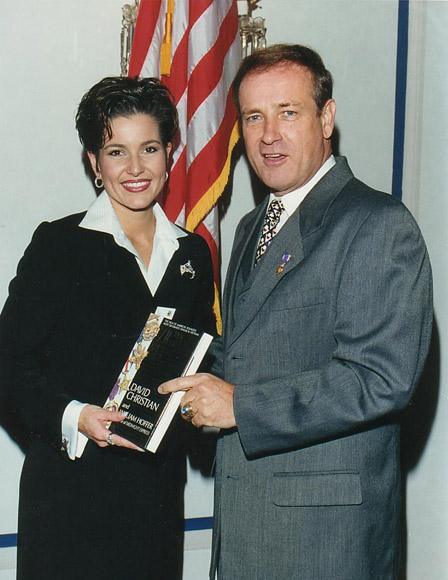
David Christian presenting his book "Victor Six" to Miss America Heather French

In July 1981, material pertaining to Agent Orange health issues was stolen from his office in what Christian characterized as a "Watergate type" burglary.

Christian is a former Fox News military analyst, having worked with them from 2002 to 2003. Christian is also interviewed in the documentary Picking Up the Pieces (Making sense of the 60's V.5). Christian also appears in the John Pilger "Heroes" documentary.

He collaborated with William Hoffer on the 1991 autobiographical Victor Six.

== 2012 U.S. Senate election ==
In mid-2011, Christian formed an exploratory committee to consider a run for the United States Senate seat formally held by incumbent Democrat Bob Casey, Jr. in the 2012 election.

Later in the year, Christian officially declared his candidacy for the U.S. Senate for the seat being held by incumbent Bob Casey, Jr. In his campaign announcement, Christian described himself as a "Ronald Reagan Republican". A poll conducted by the Pittsburgh Tribune-Review/WPXI-TV in early February 2012 showed Christian tied for last in the Republican field, with 1% of respondents. A poll conducted in late February by PoliticsPA of the website's readership, however, placed Christian in second place, trailing only Sam Rohrer. Christian finished with 21% of respondents (364 votes) to Rohrer's 37% (651 votes).

Christian was defeated in the April 24, 2012, primary by Tom Smith.

== Military awards ==
David Christian receives the Purple Heart.

Christian's military decorations and awards include:

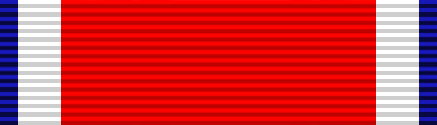
| Combat Infantryman Badge |
| Parachutist Badge |
| Distinguished Service Cross |
| Silver Star with One Bronze Oak Leaf Cluster |
| Bronze Star with "V" Device and Oak Leaf Cluster |
| Purple Heart with One Silver and One Bronze Oak Leaf Clusters |
| Air Medal with oak leaf cluster |
| Army Commendation Medal |
| National Defense Service Medal |
| Vietnam Service Medal with three 3/16" bronze stars |
| Republic of Vietnam Gallantry Cross with star and palm |
| Republic of Vietnam Gallantry Cross Unit Citation with palm and frame |
| Republic of Vietnam Civil Actions Unit Citation with palm and frame |
| Republic of Vietnam Campaign Medal with 1960- device |
| Conspicuous Service Cross |
