= Wilson School District =

School district in Pennsylvania, United States

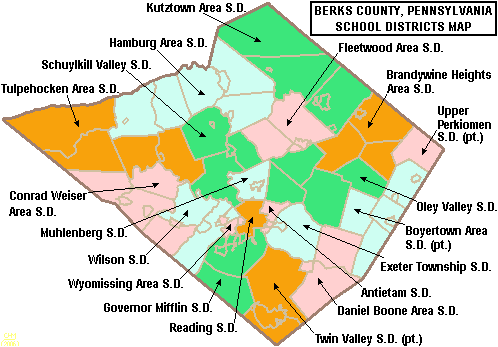

The Wilson School District serves students from the communities of Spring, West Lawn, Sinking Spring, Lower Heidelberg, and the Berkshire Heights section of Wyomissing, and is located in West Lawn, Pennsylvania. The district operates five elementary schools (Whitfield, Cornwall Terrace, Shiloh Hills, Green Valley, Spring Ridge), two middle schools (Wilson West Middle School, Wilson Southern Middle School), and Wilson High School.

== Transportation ==
Wilson operates 89 vehicles. This includes 19 72 passenger propane school buses; 29 72 passenger diesel school buses; 2 48 passenger propane wheel chair accessible school buses; 3 48 passenger diesel wheel chair accessible school buses; 2 36 passenger propane school buses; 4 36 passenger propane wheel chair accessible school buses; 3 unleaded gasoline 30 passenger mini school buses; 2 30 passenger propane mini school buses; 1 18 passenger unleaded gasoline wheel chair accessible mini school bus; and 24 9 passenger school vans.
