= Rio Grande Valley Vipers =

American professional basketball team of the NBA G League

- Conference: Western
- League: NBA G League
- Founded: 2007
- History: Rio Grande Valley Vipers; 2007–present
- Arena: Bert Ogden Arena
- Location: Edinburg, Texas
- Team colors: Red, gray, black, white
- General manager: Travis Stockbridge
- Head coach: Joseph Blair
- Ownership: Alonzo Cantu
- Affiliation: Houston Rockets
- Championships: 4 (2010, 2013, 2019, 2022)
- Conference titles: 7 (2010, 2011, 2013, 2017, 2019, 2022, 2023)
- Division titles: 3 (2010, 2013, 2019)
- Website: riograndevalley.gleague.nba.com

The Rio Grande Valley Vipers are an American professional basketball team of the NBA G League based in Edinburg, Texas. They are affiliated with the Houston Rockets, and play their home games at the Bert Ogden Arena. The Vipers have won four league titles in 2010, 2013, 2019, and 2022, the most for any club in league history. They also have made the most championship series in league history, having made it seven times to the finals. They are also the earliest champion to still play in their original city along with one of only three teams (the others being the Iowa Wolves and the Noblesville Boom) to have played in every league season since 2007. The Vipers entered a single-partnership affiliation agreement with the Houston Rockets during the 2009–10 season. Previously, they were affiliated with the Cleveland Cavaliers for the 2007–08 season and the New Orleans Hornets from 2008 to 2009.

== History ==
In late January 2007, during the 2006–07 season, the D-League announced an expansion to Hidalgo, Texas. Months later, the team was christened the "Rio Grande Valley Vipers", becoming the 14th team in league history, and they would play at Dodge Arena. The Vipers played their first game as a franchise on November 23, 2007, where they beat the Austin Toros 104–97 in front of over 5,000 fans at home. In their debut season, they finished with a 21–29 record, failing to qualify for the playoffs. In March 2008, four games before the season ended, inaugural head coach Bob Hoffman announced his resignation, as he decided to pursue a coaching job in college basketball.

The next season, they finished with the same record, failing to advance to the playoffs for the second year in a row. In 2009, the Vipers and the Houston Rockets entered into a single-affiliation partnership in which the Rockets controlled the team's basketball operations, while the business affairs would be handled by owner Alonzo Cantu. On August 18, 2009, the Rockets fired Clay Moser as coach, and named Chris Finch as coach on September 29. The result paid immediate dividends in the 2009–10 season, as the Vipers enjoyed their most successful season. Led by league MVP Mike Harris, and coach of the year in Chris Finch, the Vipers went 34–16 to lead the Western Conference and earned the franchise's first playoff berth. In the playoffs, the Vipers beat both the Reno Bighorns and Austin Toros in three games each to reach the D League Finals. They then met the Tulsa 66ers in the finals. They won Game 1 on April 25 by a score of 124–107 in Tulsa before returning home for Game 2 on April 27, which had an attendance of 6,198 to see them at the Arena, the most to see a Vipers game in their history. Harris led all scorers with 26 points, but it came down to the buzzer that resulted in a three-point attempt by Craig Winder that went in to provide a 94–91 victory to win the first championship in team history, which was also the first championship for the region since the Edinburg Roadrunners in 2004. The Vipers made the 2011 D League Finals, losing to the Iowa Wolves. On July 14, 2011, Finch was hired as an assistant coach for the Houston Rockets. Rockets GM Daryl Morey approached Nick Nurse (coach of the Energy) about coaching the team, and Nurse, intrigued by the analytics that the Vipers and Rockets were "kind of at the forefront … of the Moneyball, analytics stuff", soon accepted the coaching position with RGV. In his two seasons as coach, the Vipers would lead the league in attempted three-point shots.

In the 2012–13 season, the Vipers went 35–15 on the heels of a 10-game winning streak to close out the season, and it was second-best among all D-League teams. In the postseason, they beat the Maine Red Claws and the Tulsa 66ers in two-game sweeps to reach the finals for the third time in four seasons. The Vipers faced the Santa Cruz Warriors, doing so in a two-game sweep that had them win Game 1 112–102 on April 25 before winning at home 102–91 on April 27 to win their second league title while also becoming the second team (and first since the 2008-09 playoffs) in the best-of-three era to go undefeated in D-League postseason play. Andrew Goudelock won the NBA Development League Most Valuable Player Award and got called up by the Los Angeles Lakers. After the season ended, Nurse left for an assistant coaching position with the Toronto Raptors. In November of that year, the Vipers announced Gianluca Pascucci as the general manager and Nevada Smith as the new head coach. Smith's teams received notice for their fast pace and eclectic shooting from the three-point line, continuing a trend set in 2009 (under previous coach Chris Finch) where the Vipers outpaced their NBA counterpart in the Houston Rockets each time, while shooting at a three-point rate higher than them all but once from 2009 to 2014); this reflected the vision of Rockets general manager Daryl Morey in seeing the Vipers as a laboratory for potential strategies to grow in the NBA. The 2013–14 team started on a hot streak, winning their first 9 games of the season; the 10 wins from the previous season combined with the nine here made for a 19-game winning streak, the longest streak in D-League regular-season history. While the Vipers finished 30–20 for a fifth-place finish among all teams, they shot a whopping 2,268 three-point attempts, which averaged to 45 shots a game.

On February 26, 2015, the Vipers broke ground on a new arena in Edinburg called Bert Ogden Arena, which was originally scheduled for completion in October 2016. The arena was reportedly initially designed to house 8,500 seats, along with being a venue used for entertainment. The Vipers would serve as the main tenant and operator (with the City of Edinburg acting as owner of the arena), complete with a 40-by-20 foot jumbotron, the largest in the league. The arena was half-funded by sales taxes to go with private funding that resulted in an initial estimated cost of $68 million. On August 18 of that year, the Vipers named Matt Brase their new head coach.

After a few delays, the new arena was announced to have a grand opening in June 2018, with the Vipers beginning play in the arena for the 2018–19 season, with an end cost of $88 million. The 2017–18 season was the 11th and final season for the team at their original arena (originally known as Dodge Arena before rebranding to State Farm Arena), and they were the longest tenant to ever play in the venue. On April 12, 2019, the Vipers won their third championship in a 129–112 game three win against the Long Island Nets, having rallied from a loss in the first game to win two straight, with Isaiah Hartenstein scoring 30 points in the clinching game to lead the Vipers to victory.

The Vipers have seen two of their coaches become head coaches in the NBA, Nick Nurse and Chris Finch, with the former being the first coach to lead both an NBA and NBA G-League team to championships. On October 1, 2019, assistant coach Mahmoud Abdelfattah was promoted to head coach after Joseph Blair left for an assistant job with the Philadelphia 76ers; Abdelfattah became the first Palestinian and Muslim head coach in NBA/NBA G League history. Travis Stockbridge was named general manager, becoming the youngest general manager in NBA G League history at the age of 25.

In the 2021–22 season, the Vipers became the second team in league history to sweep the major three G League awards: the NBA G League Coach of the Year Award for Mahmoud Abdelfattah (just the second Vipers coach to win the award), NBA G League Most Valuable Player Award for Trevelin Queen (the third Viper to win the award), and the NBA G League Team Executive of the Year Award for general manager Travis Stockbridge (the second Vipers executive to win the award). They reached the postseason for the tenth time in their fifteen-season history, becoming the fourth team in league history to reach the postseason ten times; they reached the NBA G League Finals for the sixth time, doing so with victories over the Texas Legends in the Conference Semifinal and the Agua Caliente Clippers in the Conference Final. On April 12, they won 145–128 in Game 1; the points scored by the Vipers was an NBA G League Finals record, and the 44 points scored by Trevelin Queen is second-most in finals history. Daishen Nix (31 points, 12 rebounds, 11 assists) and Anthony Lamb (10 points, 10 rebounds, and 10 assists) each recorded triple-doubles, which is the first occasion of a triple-double since 2013 and the first ever G League Finals game to feature two triple doubles. On April 14, they defeated the Blue Coats 131–114 to win their fourth title.

On February 12, 2023, they reached the 3rd place of the 2023 FIBA Intercontinental Cup.

== Season-by-season ==
Season	Division	Conference	Regular season				Playoffs
Season	Division	Conference	Finish	Wins	Losses	Pct.	Playoffs
Rio Grande Valley Vipers
2007–08	Southwestern	—	5th	21	29	.420	
2008–09	Southwestern	—	4th	21	29	.420	
2009–10	—	Western	1st	34	16	.680	Won First Round (Reno) 2–1; Won Semifinals (Austin) 2–1; Won D-League Finals (Tulsa) 2–0
2010–11	—	Western	2nd	33	17	.660	Won First Round (Bakersfield) 2–1; Won Semifinals (Reno) 2–0; Lost D-League Finals (Iowa) 1–2
2011–12	—	Western	5th	24	26	.480	
2012–13	—	Central	1st	35	15	.700	Won First Round (Maine) 2–0; Won Semifinals (Tulsa) 2–0; Won D-League Finals (Santa Cruz) 2–0
2013–14	Central	Western	3rd	30	20	.600	Won First Round (Iowa) 2–1; Lost Semifinals (Santa Cruz) 1–2
2014–15	Southwest	Western	3rd	27	23	.540	
2015–16	Southwest	Western	2nd	29	21	.580	Lost First Round (Austin) 1–2
2016–17	Southwest	Western	2nd	32	18	.640	Won First Round (Los Angeles) 2–1; Won Conference Finals (Oklahoma City) 2–1; Lost Finals (Raptors 905) 1–2
2017–18	Southwest	Western	2nd	29	21	.580	Won First Round (Texas) 107–100; Lost Conference Semifinal (Austin) 91–117
2018–19	Southwest	Western	1st	34	16	.680	Won Conference Semifinal (Memphis) 135–118; Won Conference Final (Santa Cruz) 144–125; Won G-League Finals (Long Island) 2–1
2019–20	Southwest	Western	4th	15	27	.357	Season cancelled by COVID-19 pandemic
2020–21	—	—	7th	9	6	.600	Lost Quarterfinals (Santa Cruz) 81–110
2021–22	—	Western	1st	24	10	.706	Won Conference Semifinal (Texas) 120–103; Won Conference Final (Agua Caliente) 125–114; Won G-League Finals (Delaware) 2–0
2022–23	—	Western	6th	18	14	.563	Won Conference Quarterfinal (South Bay) 124–122; Won Conference Semifinal (Memphis) 110–108; Won Conference Final (Sioux Falls) 110–105; Lost G-League Finals (Delaware) 0–2
2023–24	—	Western	6th	20	14	.588	Lost Conference Quarterfinal (Oklahoma City) 125–126 (OT)
2024–25	—	Western	6th	20	14	.588	Lost Conference Quarterfinal (Salt Lake City) 102–129
Regular season				455	336	.575	
Playoffs				37	20	.649	

== Current roster ==
Rio Grande Valley Vipers roster
Players

Pos.	No.	Player	Height	Weight	DOB	From
F/C	13	Vernon Carey Jr.	6 ft 10 in (2.08 m)	270 lb (122 kg)	2001-02-25	Duke
C	–	Rafael Castro (TW)	6 ft 11 in (2.11 m)	220 lb (100 kg)	2003-03-30	George Washington
G	–	Quadir Copeland (TW)	6 ft 6 in (1.98 m)	220 lb (100 kg)	2003-09-04	NC State
G	14	Ricky Council IV	6 ft 6 in (1.98 m)	207 lb (94 kg)	2001-08-03	Arkansas
F	9	Cameron Matthews	6 ft 7 in (2.01 m)	220 lb (100 kg)	2001-12-23	Mississippi State
G	22	Caleb McConnell	6 ft 7 in (2.01 m)	195 lb (88 kg)	1999-06-08	Rutgers
G	7	Stevie Mitchell	6 ft 3 in (1.91 m)	200 lb (91 kg)	2003-01-29	Marquette
G	1	Daishen Nix	6 ft 4 in (1.93 m)	238 lb (108 kg)	2002-02-13	NBA G League Ignite
G	–	Sean Pedulla (TW)	6 ft 1 in (1.85 m)	195 lb (88 kg)	2002-10-10	Mississippi
F	6	Jonathan Pierre	6 ft 9 in (2.06 m)	210 lb (95 kg)	2003-04-20	Belmont

Coaches
Head coach
- Joseph Blair
Assistant(s)
- Daniel Brady
- Robbie Keck
- Kimberly McCartney
- Craig Skinner
- Isaiah Torres
- Jimmy Vidas

Legend
- (DP) Unsigned draft pick
- (FA) Free agent
- (S) Suspended
- (P) Prospects
- (NBA) On assignment from NBA affiliate
- (TW) Two-way affiliate player
- Injured

Roster
Updated: March 15, 2026

== Head coaches ==
#	Head coach	Term	Regular season				Playoffs				Achievements
#	Head coach	Term	G	W	L	Win%	G	W	L	Win%	Achievements
1	Bob Hoffman	2007–2008	50	21	29	.420	—	—	—	—	
2	Clay Moser	2008–2009	50	21	29	.420	—	—	—	—	
3	Chris Finch	2009–2011	100	67	33	.670	16	11	5	.688	2010 D-League Championship
4	Nick Nurse	2011–2013	100	59	41	.590	6	6	0	1.000	2013 D-League Championship
5	Nevada Smith	2013–2015	100	57	43	.570	6	3	3	.500	
6	Matt Brase	2015–2018	150	90	60	.600	14	7	7	.500	2017 D-League Western Conference Champions
7	Joseph Blair	2018–2019; 2024–present	84	54	30	.643	5	4	2	.667	2019 G League Championship
8	Mahmoud Abdelfattah	2019–2022	91	48	43	.527	5	4	1	.750	2022 G League Championship
9	Kevin Burleson	2022–2024	66	38	28	.576	6	3	3	.500	2023 G League Western Conference Champions

== Past players ==
- See Category:Rio Grande Valley Vipers players for all players who are notable enough to have articles and have played for the team.

== NBA affiliates ==
- Houston Rockets (2009–present)
- Cleveland Cavaliers (2007–2008)
- New Orleans Hornets (2007–2009)
