= Pennsylvania House of Representatives, District 128 =

American legislative district

Pennsylvania's 128th State House of Representatives district
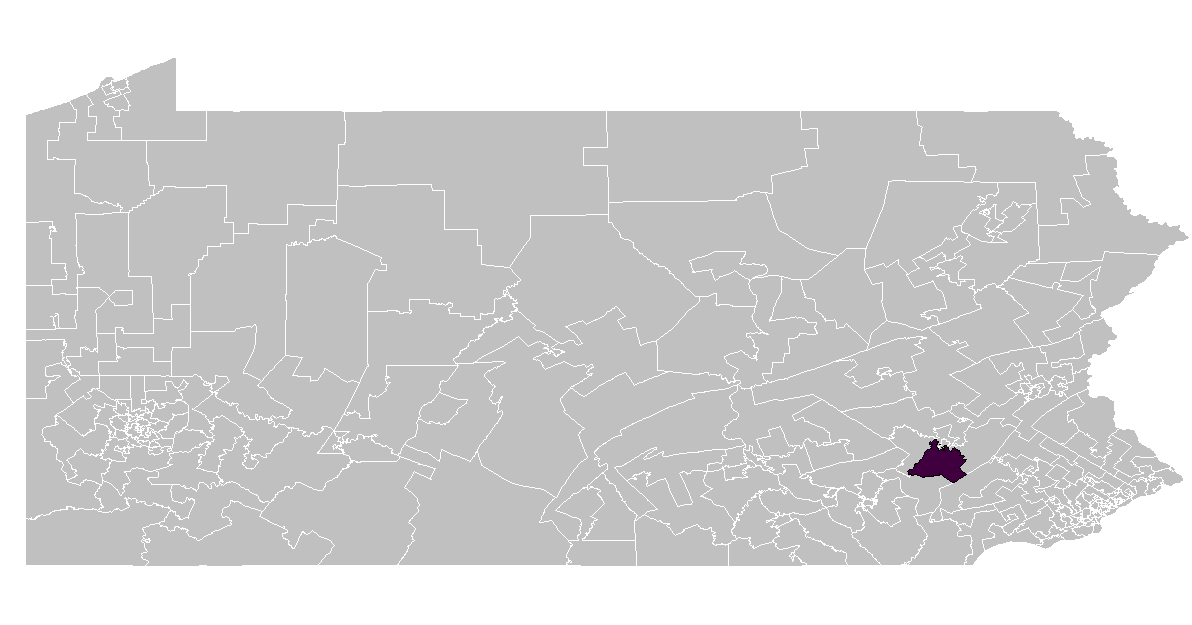
Representative
Mark M. Gillen; R–Robeson Township

The 128th Pennsylvania House of Representatives District is located in Berks County and Lancaster County and includes the following areas:

- Berks County
  - Brecknock Township
  - Caernarvon Township
  - Cumru Township
  - Exeter Township (PART, Precincts 03 and 07)
  - Mohnton
  - New Morgan
- Berks County (continued)
  - Robeson Township
  - Shillington
- Lancaster County
  - Brecknock Township

== Representatives ==
Representative	Party	Years	District home	Note
Prior to 1969, seats were apportioned by county.
James J. Gallen	Republican	1969 – 1992		
Samuel E. Rohrer	Republican	1993 – 2010	Reading	
Mark M. Gillen	Republican	2011 – present	Mohnton	Incumbent
