= Mark M. Gillen =

American politician

Mark Gillen
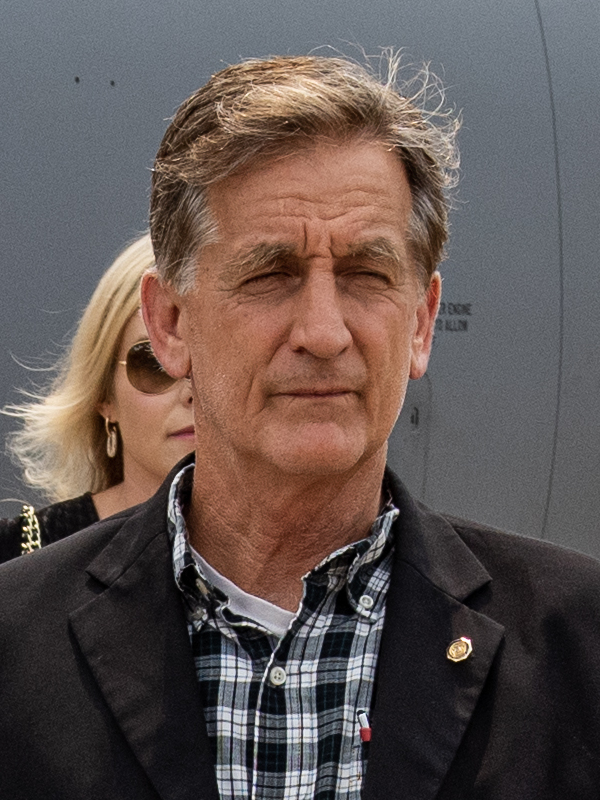
- Gillen at the 171st Air Refueling Wing (2023)

Member of the Pennsylvania House of Representatives from the 128th district
- Incumbent
- Assumed office January 4, 2011
- Preceded by: Sam Rohrer

Personal details
- Born: November 6, 1955 (age 70) Bristol, Pennsylvania, U.S.
- Party: Republican
- Spouse: Kim
- Children: Five
- Education: Bob Jones University; Kutztown University
- Occupation: Politician

Mark M. Gillen (born November 6, 1955) is an American politician and member of the Republican Party.

== Biography ==
Gillen previously served as a Mohnton borough councilman, and lives in Robeson Township with his wife, Kim, and their five daughters.

In 2010, he was elected to represent the 128th District in the Pennsylvania House of Representatives. The seat had been vacated by Republican Sam Rohrer, who had unsuccessfully challenged State Attorney General Tom Corbett in the May 2010 Republican gubernatorial primary. Gillen is currently serving on the Aging and Older Adult Services, Education, Labor and Industry, and Veterans Affairs and Emergency Preparedness committees.

Gillen co-founded, and is president of, the Berks Military History Museum, located in Mohnton, Pennsylvania.
