= Kerry Collins =

American football player (born 1972)

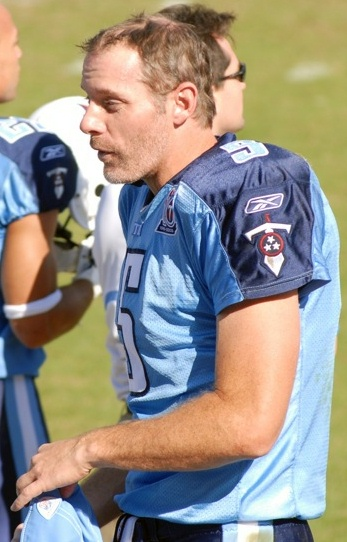
- Collins with the Tennessee Titans in 2008

No. 12, 13, 5
- Position: Quarterback

Personal information
- Born: December 30, 1972 (age 53); Lebanon, Pennsylvania, U.S.
- Listed height: 6 ft 5 in (1.96 m)
- Listed weight: 247 lb (112 kg)

Career information
- High school: Wilson (West Lawn, Pennsylvania)
- College: Penn State (1991–1994)
- NFL draft: 1995: 1st round, 5th overall pick

Career history
- Carolina Panthers (1995–1998); New Orleans Saints (1998); New York Giants (1999–2003); Oakland Raiders (2004–2005); Tennessee Titans (2006–2010); Indianapolis Colts (2011)

Awards and highlights
- 2× Pro Bowl (1996, 2008); PFWA All-Rookie Team (1995); George Halas Award (2001); 83rd greatest New York Giant of all-time; Maxwell Award (1994); Davey O'Brien Award (1994); Sammy Baugh Trophy (1994); Quarterback of the Year (1994); Consensus All-American (1994); Big Ten Most Valuable Player (1994); Big Ten Offensive Player of the Year (1994); First-team All-Big Ten (1994)

Career NFL statistics
- Passing attempts: 6,261
- Passing completions: 3,487
- Completion percentage: 55.7%
- TD–INT: 208–196
- Passing yards: 40,922
- Passer rating: 73.8
- Stats at Pro Football Reference
- College Football Hall of Fame

Kerry Michael Collins (born December 30, 1972) is an American former professional football quarterback who played in the National Football League (NFL) for 17 seasons. Collins was a member of six NFL teams, most notably the Carolina Panthers, New York Giants, and Tennessee Titans. He played college football for the Penn State Nittany Lions, winning the Maxwell Award, Davey O'Brien Award, and Sammy Baugh Trophy in 1994.

Taken by the Panthers fifth overall in the 1995 NFL draft, Collins was the franchise's first draft selection. In his second season, he helped the Panthers become the youngest NFL expansion team to clinch their division and appear in a conference championship, also earning him Pro Bowl honors. Collins served as the Giants starting quarterback from 1999 to 2003, leading them to an appearance in Super Bowl XXXV. Following a period of limited success, Collins earned a second Pro Bowl selection after helping the Titans obtain a league-best 13–3 record in 2008. He saw less playing time in his final three years and retired after the 2011 season. Collins was inducted to the College Football Hall of Fame in 2018.

== Early life ==
Collins was born in Lebanon, Pennsylvania. He attended Lebanon High School, until 1987, and then transferred to Wilson High School in West Lawn, Pennsylvania, where he played football, basketball, and baseball.

== College career ==
Collins attended Pennsylvania State University, where he played for coach Joe Paterno's Penn State Nittany Lions football team from 1991 to 1994. As a senior quarterback in 1994, he was recognized as a consensus first-team All-American, having received first-team honors from the Associated Press, United Press International, The Football News, the Football Writers Association of America, the Walter Camp Foundation, and The Sporting News.

Collins also captured two of college football's major postseason prizes – the Maxwell Award, presented to the nation's outstanding player, and the Davey O'Brien Award, which goes to the nation's top quarterback. Collins finished fourth in the Heisman Trophy balloting that year. He was chosen UPI Back-of-the-Year and garnered Player-of-the-Year honors from ABC-TV/Chevrolet and the Big Ten Conference. Collins made a serious run at the NCAA season passing efficiency record, falling just four points short (172.8), the fourth-highest figure in NCAA annals. He broke Penn State season records for total offense (2,660), completions (176), passing yardage (2,679), completion percentage (66.7), yards per attempt (10.15) and passing efficiency (172.86). He had 14 consecutive completions at Minnesota, another Penn State record. Collins was the linchpin of an explosive offense (including Ki-Jana Carter, Kyle Brady, and Bobby Engram) that shattered 14 school records and led the nation in scoring (47.8 ppg.) and total offense (520.2 ypg.).

With 5,304 career passing yards, Collins ranks third in Penn State annals and is one of only three quarterbacks to top 5,000 yards through the air. With Collins at quarterback, the 1994 Nittany Lions completed an undefeated season, the fifth under coach Joe Paterno, capped by a Rose Bowl win over Pac-10 Champion Oregon. His team was voted #1 by The New York Times, although they were voted #2 behind undefeated Nebraska in the traditional polls (AP Poll and Coaches' Poll) used to determine Division I-A champions prior to the BCS era. In 2018, he was inducted into the College Football Hall of Fame.

== Professional career ==
Pre-draft measurables
Height	Weight	Arm length	Hand span	40-yard dash
6 ft 5 in (1.96 m)	240 lb (109 kg)	32 3/4 in (0.83 m)	10 in (0.25 m)	4.9 s
All values from NFL Combine/pre-draft

Collins presently ranks 20th all-time in NFL career passing yardage and 19th all-time in NFL career passing completions. His TD:INT ratio and completion percentage were less impressive, however, resulting in passer ratings of 73.8 and 75.3 for the regular season and postseason. He was also less successful in wins and losses, finishing with a .450 regular season winning percentage and a .429 playoff winning percentage. Despite this, he defeated every NFL team except the Miami Dolphins.

=== Carolina Panthers ===
Collins was selected as the Carolina Panthers' first round pick (fifth overall) in the 1995 NFL draft. He was the first player ever chosen by the Panthers in the annual college draft, though other players—some free agent, as well as players from the expansion draft—had previously signed with the team. He was named to the NFL All-Rookie Team. In Week 15 of the 1996 season, he was named NFC Offensive Player of the Week. He was named as a Pro Bowler in the 1996 season. In his three seasons there, he threw for 7,295 yards, 39 touchdowns, and 49 interceptions. His completion percentage was 52.6% and his quarterback rating was 65.6. In his second season, he led them to the NFC Championship, where they lost to the Green Bay Packers 30–13.

Collins threw 21 interceptions during the 1997 season and the Panthers finished 7–9, just one season after advancing to the NFC Championship.

Carolina started the 1998 season with Collins as its starting quarterback. After an 0–4 start, Collins walked into head coach Dom Capers' office and, as Collins later put it, "told Coach Capers my heart's not in it, I'm not happy, and I don't feel like I can play right now." He asked to be traded, but was instead placed on waivers by Carolina during the 1998 season and subsequently signed with the New Orleans Saints to finish the season.

Collins would later say that he did not intend to quit the Panthers, only to sit out for a few weeks. However, Capers interpreted his request as quitting on the team and he was released. He later admitted that much of his erratic behavior was due to his struggles with alcoholism. After being arrested for drunk driving later that year, he was ordered by the NFL to seek treatment for alcohol abuse.

=== New Orleans Saints ===
After signing with the Saints, Collins started the final seven games of the season, but had only two wins. In his lone season with the Saints, Collins threw for 1,202 yards, four touchdowns, and 10 interceptions.

=== New York Giants ===
Collins started the 1999 season as the Giants' second-string quarterback behind Kent Graham, but claimed the starting job in Week 11 as Graham struggled with a 5–4 record. In Week 13, he was named NFC Offensive Player of the Week. In the 2000 season, Collins started all 16 games for the first time in his career and led the Giants to home field advantage in the playoffs with a 12–4 record. In the NFC Championship Game, Collins had a record-setting day, passing for 381 yards and five touchdowns in New York's 41–0 win over the Minnesota Vikings to advance them to Super Bowl XXXV, where they lost to the Baltimore Ravens. He went 15-of-39 for 112 yards while throwing for four interceptions, with one being returned for a touchdown. His passer rating of 7.1 is the second worst in Super Bowl history.

In Week 17 of the 2001 season, Collins passed for a career-high 386 yards to go with one touchdown and two interceptions in a 34–25 loss to the Green Bay Packers. During the 2001 season, Collins set a single-season NFL record with 23 fumbles, a record tied in 2002 by then-Minnesota Vikings quarterback Daunte Culpepper.

In 2002, Collins set the Giants' single season franchise passing record with 4,073 yards; this record was broken by Eli Manning in 2011. In Week 2 of the 2002 season, he was named NFC Offensive Player of the Week. In Week 16, he passed for 366 yards and four touchdowns in the 44–27 victory over the Indianapolis Colts. He had a perfect passer rating in the game. He earned NFC Offensive Player of the Week for his game against the Colts. He was named NFC Offensive Player of the Month for December 2002. In Week 3 of the 2003 season, he was named NFC Offensive Player of the Week. After five seasons, 68 starts and 16,875 yards, Collins was released by the Giants in 2004. The team had already signed former league MVP Kurt Warner and traded for 2004's #1 draft pick, Eli Manning.

=== Oakland Raiders ===
After his release from the Giants, Collins signed a three-year, $16.82 million contract with the Oakland Raiders. Collins began the 2004 season as the team's backup to Rich Gannon, but took over the starting role when Gannon suffered a neck injury in the third week of the regular season. In Week 15 of the 2004 season, he passed for a career-high five touchdowns to go with 371 yards and one interception in a 40–35 win over the Tennessee Titans. Collins was the team's starting quarterback for the 2005 season, subsequent to Gannon's retirement.

The 2005 season started off well for Collins, but he was benched after a 34–10 Week 12 loss to the San Diego Chargers. He was replaced by Marques Tuiasosopo. After Tuiasosopo's 26–10 loss at the Jets in Week 13, Collins regained his starting job in Week 14 against the Cleveland Browns (a 9–7 loss at home). After two seasons and a 7–21 record with the Raiders, Collins was cut on March 10, 2006, in what was at least partially a move designed to free space with the salary cap.

=== Tennessee Titans ===
On August 28, 2006, Collins agreed to a one-year contract with the Tennessee Titans. After three games, all losses for the Titans, Collins had completed fewer than half his passes, and had thrown one touchdown and six interceptions. Vince Young, who played extensively as a substitute in the second game, started the fourth through sixth games while Collins saw no playing time in any of them. On March 5, 2007, he re-signed with the Titans.

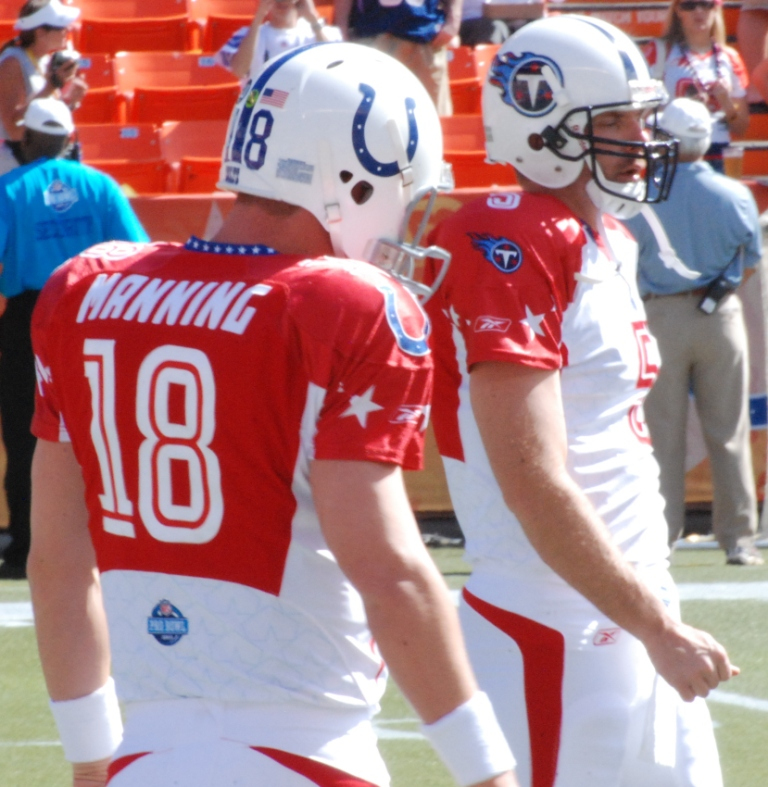
Collins (right) and Peyton Manning at the 2009 Pro Bowl.

After Young was injured against Jacksonville on September 7, 2008, Collins finished the game and was named the Titans' starting quarterback for the rest of 2008, later that week. On September 21, 2008, Collins became the 15th player in NFL history to pass for more than 35,000 yards. Coming into the game against the Houston Texans, Collins needed only 90 yards to eclipse the mark. On his ninth completion of 13 attempts, Collins completed a 17-yard pass to Justin McCareins to give him 107 yards on the day and 35,017 yards for his career.

The Titans finished the 2008 regular season with a record of 13–3, top seed in the playoffs, and a first round bye. In the Divisional Round, they lost to the Baltimore Ravens 13–10. Collins indicated after the season that he would like to play in 2009, but only as a starter. Collins replaced Jets quarterback Brett Favre in the 2009 Pro Bowl, after first alternate Philip Rivers pulled out. He re-signed with the Titans on February 27, 2009. His new contract was worth $15 million, with $8.5 million guaranteed over two years.

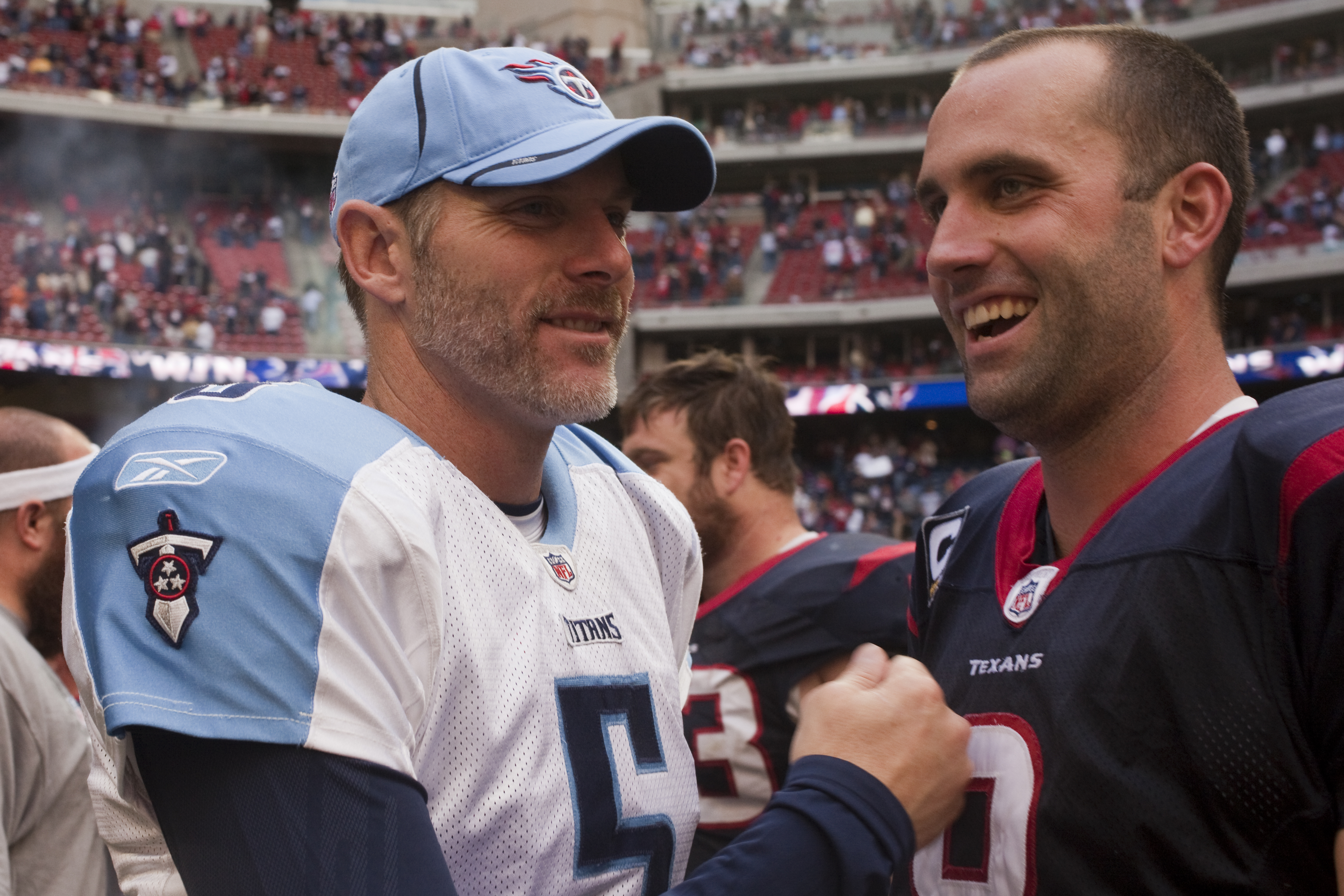
Collins (left) and Matt Schaub.

Collins returned as the team's starting quarterback for the beginning of the 2009 season. In week six, the Titans were defeated by the New England Patriots, 59–0. After that loss and an 0–6 record on the season, coach Jeff Fisher replaced Collins as starting quarterback with Vince Young, three days before the November 1, 2009, game against the Jacksonville Jaguars. Fisher stated that he was against this decision, saying that the problems with the team were unrelated to quarterback play, but he made the substitution after being urged by Titans owner Bud Adams to do so. The Titans won five straight games with Young as quarterback, and later finished the season 8–8.

Collins officially announced his retirement from the NFL on July 7, 2011.

=== Indianapolis Colts ===
On August 24, 2011, Collins decided to forgo his retirement plans and agreed with the Indianapolis Colts on a contract deal. The contract was a one-year deal for $4 million. Collins was signed as insurance for Peyton Manning, who was recovering from offseason neck surgery. The Colts named Collins the starter for week one, ending Manning's streak of 227 consecutive starts (208 regular season plus 19 playoff games) and making Collins the first quarterback other than Manning to start a regular-season game for the Colts since Jim Harbaugh in week 17 of the 1997 NFL season. On October 25, 2011, the Colts placed Collins on injured reserve due to a concussion, ending his season.

== Career statistics ==
=== NFL ===
Legend
	Led the league
**Bold**	Career high

==== Regular season ====
Year	Team	Games			Passing								Rushing			
Year	Team	GP	GS	Record	Cmp	Att	Pct	Yds	Avg	TD	Int	Rtg	Att	Yds	Avg	TD
1995	CAR	15	13	7–6	214	432	49.5	2,717	6.3	14	19	61.9	42	74	1.8	**3**
1996	CAR	13	12	9–3	204	364	56.0	2,454	6.7	14	9	79.4	32	38	1.2	0
1997	CAR	13	13	6–7	200	381	52.5	2,124	5.6	11	**21**	55.7	26	65	2.5	1
1998	CAR	4	4	0–4	76	162	46.9	1,011	6.2	8	5	70.8	7	40	**5.7**	0
1998	NO	7	7	2–5	94	191	49.2	1,202	6.3	4	10	54.5	23	**113**	4.9	1
1999	NYG	10	7	2–5	191	332	57.5	2,316	7.0	8	11	73.3	19	36	1.9	2
2000	NYG	16	16	12–4	311	529	58.8	3,610	6.8	**22**	13	83.1	41	65	1.6	1
2001	NYG	16	16	7–9	327	**568**	57.6	3,764	6.6	19	16	77.1	39	73	1.9	0
2002	NYG	16	16	10–6	**335**	545	**61.5**	**4,073**	**7.5**	19	14	**85.4**	**44**	-3	-0.1	0
2003	NYG	13	13	4–9	284	500	56.8	3,110	6.2	13	16	70.7	17	49	2.9	0
2004	OAK	14	13	3–10	289	513	56.3	3,495	6.8	21	20	74.8	16	36	2.3	0
2005	OAK	15	15	4–11	302	565	53.5	3,759	6.7	20	12	77.3	17	39	2.3	1
2006	TEN	4	3	0–3	42	90	46.7	549	6.1	1	6	42.3	0	0	0.0	0
2007	TEN	6	1	1–0	50	82	61.0	531	6.5	0	0	79.9	3	-3	-1.0	0
2008	TEN	16	15	**12–3**	242	415	58.3	2,676	6.4	12	7	80.2	25	49	2.0	0
2009	TEN	7	6	0–6	119	216	55.1	1,225	5.7	6	8	65.5	11	15	1.4	1
2010	TEN	10	7	2–5	160	278	57.6	1,823	6.6	14	8	82.2	10	1	0.1	0
2011	IND	3	3	0–3	48	98	49.0	481	4.9	2	1	65.9	2	-1	-0.5	0
Career		198	190	81–99	3,487	6,261	55.7	40,922	6.5	208	196	73.8	374	686	1.8	10

==== Postseason ====
Year	Team	Games			Passing								Rushing			
Year	Team	GP	GS	Record	Cmp	Att	Pct	Yds	Avg	TD	Int	Rtg	Att	Yds	Avg	TD
1996	CAR	2	2	1–1	31	59	52.5	315	5.3	3	3	63.9	7	4	0.6	0
2000	NYG	**3**	**3**	**2–1**	**55**	**97**	56.7	**618**	6.4	**5**	**6**	67.3	**11**	**29**	**2.6**	0
2002	NYG	1	1	0–1	29	43	**67.4**	342	**8.0**	4	1	**112.7**	0	0	0.0	0
2007	TEN	0	0	Did not play												
2008	TEN	1	1	0–1	26	42	61.9	281	6.7	0	1	71.6	1	0	0.0	0
Career		7	7	3–4	141	241	58.5	1,556	6.5	12	11	75.3	19	33	1.7	0

=== College ===
Year	Team	Passing						
Year	Team	Cmp	Att	Pct	Yds	TD	Int	Rtg
1991	Penn State	3	6	50.0	95	1	1	204.7
1992	Penn State	64	137	46.7	925	4	2	110.1
1993	Penn State	127	250	50.8	1,605	13	11	113.1
1994	Penn State	176	264	66.7	2,679	21	7	172.9
Career		370	657	56.3	5,304	39	21	137.3

== Career highlights ==
=== Awards and honors ===
NFL

- 2× Pro Bowl (1996, 2008)
- NFC champion (2000)
- PFWA All-Rookie Team (1995)
- George Halas Award (2001)
- 3× FedEx Air Player of the Week – Week 3, 2003, Week 8, 2003, Week 15, 2004
- 83rd greatest New York Giant of all-time

College

- Maxwell Award (1994)
- Davey O'Brien Award (1994)
- Sammy Baugh Trophy (1994)
- Quarterback of the Year (1994)
- Consensus All-American (1994)
- Big Ten Most Valuable Player (1994)
- Big Ten Offensive Player of the Year (1994)
- First-team All-Big Ten (1994)

=== Records ===
==== Panthers franchise records ====
Collins held or shared four Panthers franchise records As of 2017:

- Passing touchdowns, rookie game (3; with Cam Newton x2)
- Interceptions, season (21 in 1997), rookie season (19; with Chris Weinke), rookie game (4 on November 12, 1995 at the St. Louis Rams and November 26, 1995 at the New Orleans Saints; with Chris Weinke and Cam Newton)

==== Giants franchise records ====
As of 2018, Collins held at least seven Giants franchise records, including:

- Most Passing Yards (playoff game): 381 (January 14, 2001 against the Minnesota Vikings)
- Most Passing TDs (playoff game): 5 (January 14, 2001 against the Minnesota Vikings)
- Most Intercepted (playoff season): 6 (2000)
- Best Passer Rating (game): 158.3 (December 22, 2002 at the Indianapolis Colts)
- Most Pass Yds/Game (playoff career): 240.0
- Most Pass Yds/Game (playoff season): 342.0 (2002)
- Most 300+ yard passing games (playoffs): two (tied with Eli Manning)

== Major League Baseball draft ==
Collins was selected by the Detroit Tigers in the 26th round of the 1990 MLB draft, but opted to attend Penn State. Detroit selected him in the 60th round of the 1991 amateur draft, but he did not sign with the club. He was again selected in the 48th round of the 1994 amateur draft by the Toronto Blue Jays but again did not sign.

== Personal life ==
Collins is married to Brooke Isenhour, whom he met at a George Strait concert in 2000. They have one child, a daughter.

=== Battles with alcoholism ===
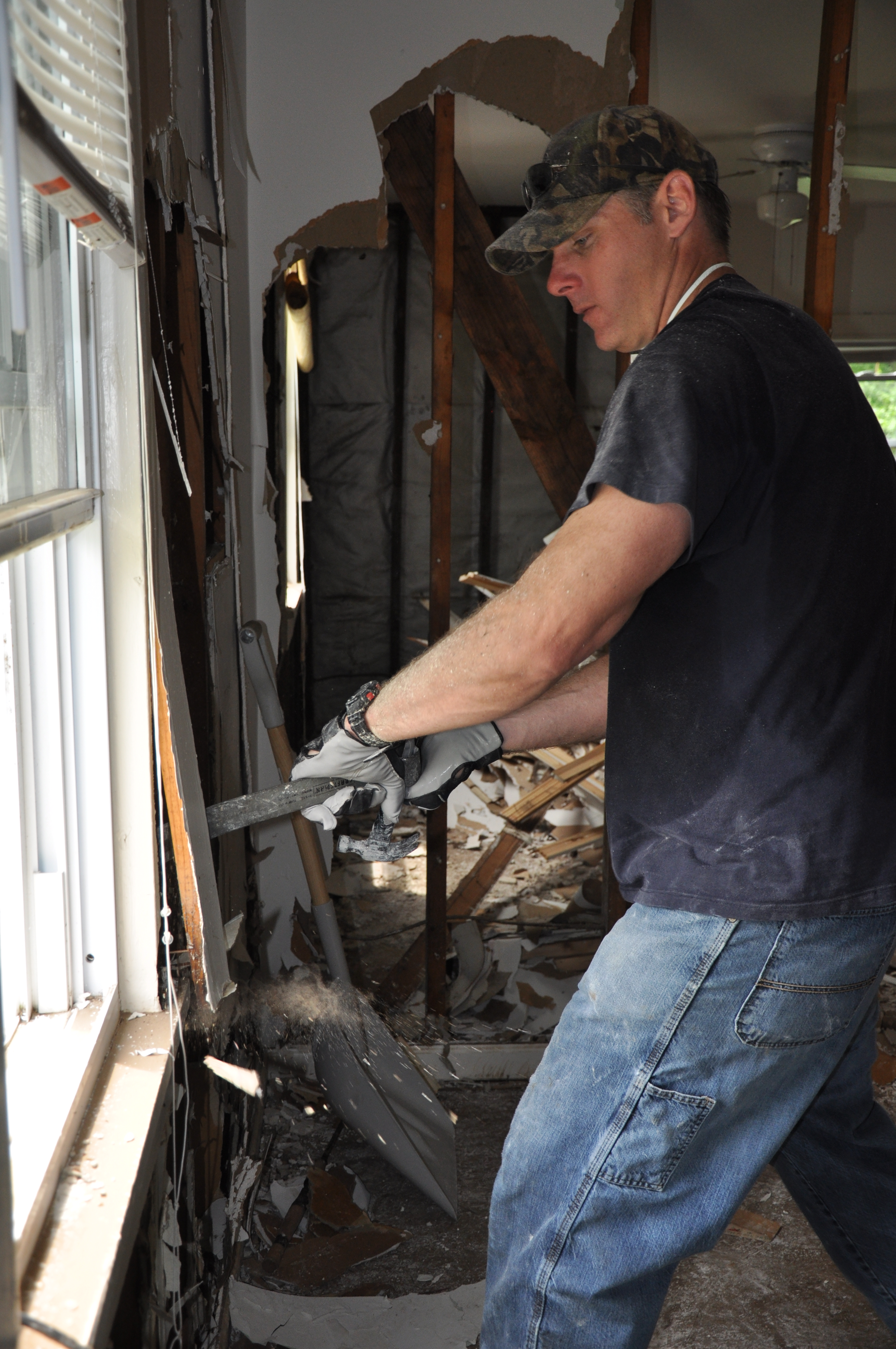
Collins in Nashville helping clean out homes after floods damaged the city

Before the 1997 season got underway, Collins's private battle with alcoholism started to make public headlines. In a highly publicized incident, on the last night of Carolina Panthers training camp in 1997, Collins used a racial slur in reference to black teammate Muhsin Muhammad while in a drunken state at a bar in Spartanburg, South Carolina. Supposedly, Collins also inadvertently slurred offensive lineman Norberto Garrido, who is of Hispanic descent. It was widely rumored that Garrido punched Collins in the eye as a result, although this was later proven false.

On November 2, 1998, Collins was arrested for drunk driving in Charlotte, North Carolina. He finished the 1998 season in New Orleans and signed with the New York Giants as a free agent on February 19, 1999. Not long before signing with New York, Collins decided to seek treatment for his alcoholism. He entered a rehabilitation clinic in Topeka, Kansas.

While a member of the Giants, Collins remained in therapy for four years. As a member of the Tennessee Titans, he readdressed the 1997 racial slur incident, explaining that "The guys were talking to each other that way, and I was trying to be funny and thought I could do it, too. I was so upset by it. It was bad judgment. I could have been labeled a racist for the rest of my career. I had to live with the way I used that word with a teammate. Extremely poor judgment. I was naïve to think I could use that word in any context."

== See also ==
- List of NCAA major college football yearly passing leaders

== Sources ==
- Reed, Steve (January 27, 2001). Once a lost soul, Collins turns career, life around The Gaston Gazette
- Gay, Nancy (October 3, 2004). Collins appreciates second chances San Francisco Chronicle
