= James Gallen =

American politician

Member of the Pennsylvania House of Representatives from the 128th district
- In office January 7, 1969 – November 30, 1992
- Preceded by: District Created
- Succeeded by: Sam Rohrer

Member of the Pennsylvania House of Representatives from the Berks County district
- In office January 5, 1965 – November 30, 1968

Personal details
- Born: August 15, 1928 Reading, Pennsylvania
- Died: April 12, 2012 (aged 83) Shillington, Pennsylvania
- Party: Republican
- Spouse: Sara
- Children: Eight

James J. "Jim" Gallen (August 15, 1928 – April 12, 2012) was a Republican member of the Pennsylvania House of Representatives.

== Formative years ==
Born in Reading, Pennsylvania, on August 15, 1928, Jim Gallen earned his Bachelor of Science from Villanova University, and served in the United States Army. Professionally, he was employed as an insurance agent.

== Political career ==
Gallen represented Berks County in the Pennsylvania House of Representatives for more than twenty-seven years, first as one of the county's at-large representatives, then as the member for the 128th District seat created in 1968, following an overhaul of the State Constitution which reapportioned seats based upon numbered districts. He announced his retirement from the State House in 1992, at which time he unsuccessfully sought the 6th Congressional District seat being vacated by Democratic incumbent Gus Yatron. Gallen was defeated in the Republican primary by Pottsville attorney John Jones, who went on to lose the general election to Schuylkill County Sheriff Tim Holden.

Gallen died on April 12, 2012, in his Shillington, Pennsylvania, home of complications stemming from appendicitis, and was buried at Shillington's Fairview Cemetery.
