= 2012 United States Senate election in Pennsylvania =

- November 6, 2012
- Turnout: 59.4% (voting eligible)
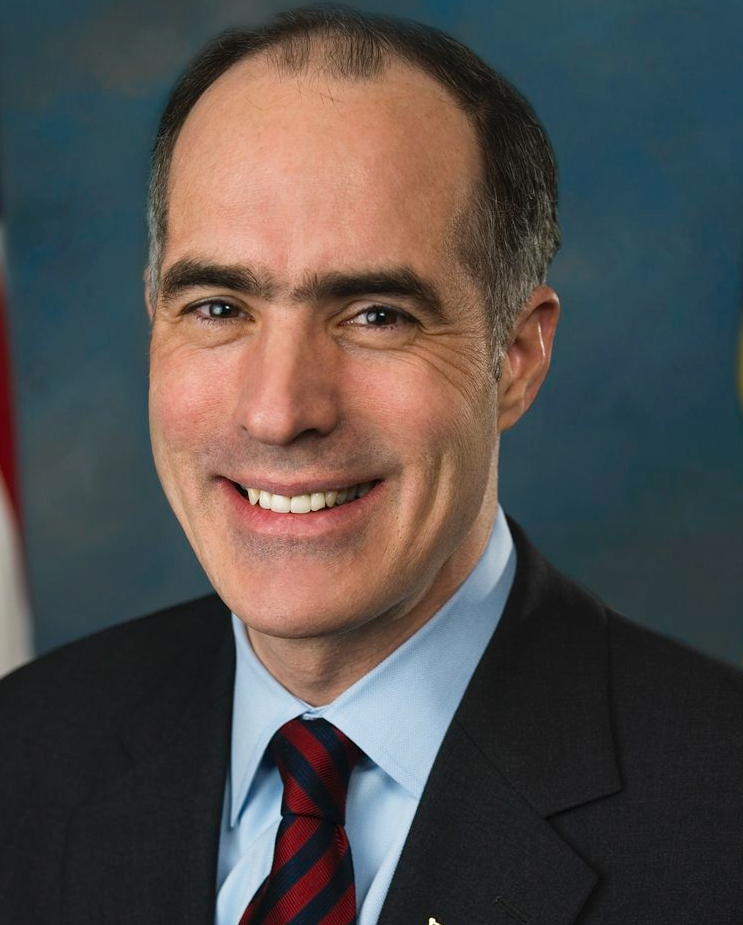

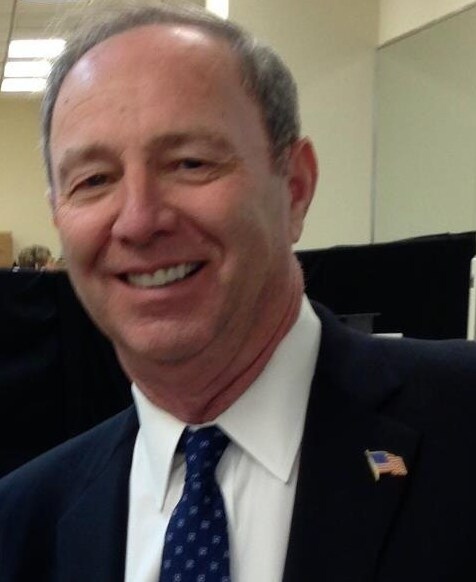
Nominee	Bob Casey Jr.	Tom Smith
Party	Democratic	Republican
Popular vote	3,021,364	2,509,132
Percentage	53.69%	44.59%
- Casey: 40–50% 50–60% 60–70% 70–80% 80–90% >90% Smith: 40–50% 50–60% 60–70% 70–80%
U.S. senator before election
Bob Casey Jr.
Democratic
Elected U.S. Senator
Bob Casey Jr.
Democratic

The 2012 United States Senate election in Pennsylvania was held on November 6, 2012, alongside a presidential election, other elections to the United States Senate in other states, elections to the United States House of Representatives, and various state and local elections. Incumbent Democratic U.S. Senator Bob Casey, Jr. ran for and won re-election to a second term, defeating Republican nominee Tom Smith, and Libertarian nominee Rayburn Smith.

The requisite primary elections occurred on April 24, 2012, during which the Republicans and Democrats selected nominees for the general election. The Republican primary was a five-way contest. Tom Smith, the eventual nominee, faced David A. Christian, Sam Rohrer, Marc Scaringi, and Steve Welch. The Democratic primary was not heavily contested. Incumbent Bob Casey, Jr., defeated Joseph Vodvarka by a wide margin. The Libertarian Party nominated Rayburn Smith.

Casey led most pre-election polls and eventually defeated his opponents to win re-election to a second term in the U.S. Senate. The election was the first time a Democrat won re-election to the U.S. Senate from Pennsylvania since the 1962 election. As of 2026, this is the last time that Fayette County and Luzerne County voted Democratic in a Senate election. This is also the only time since 1956 that Democrats have won a Pennsylvania U.S. Senate race in a presidential year.

== Background ==
On November 7, 2006, Bob Casey, Jr., the State Treasurer and son of former Governor Bob Casey, Sr., defeated two-term incumbent Republican Senator Rick Santorum with 58.64% of votes cast. Santorum's margin of defeat was the largest for an incumbent Republican senator in Pennsylvania history; it was also the first time a Democrat was elected to a full Senate term from Pennsylvania since Joseph Clark was re-elected in 1962.

== Democratic primary ==
=== Candidates ===
- Bob Casey, Jr., incumbent U.S. senator
- Joseph Vodvarka, spring maker

=== Results ===
Results by county: Casey: 70–80%; 80–90%; >90%

Democratic primary results
Party	Candidate	Votes	%
Democratic	Bob Casey, Jr. (incumbent)	565,488	80.9
Democratic	Joseph Vodvarka	133,683	19.1
Total votes		699,171	100.0

== Republican primary ==
=== Candidates ===
==== On ballot ====
- David Christian, businessman and veterans' advocate
- John Kensinger, pharmacist
- Sam Rohrer, former state representative from Robeson Township and candidate for governor in 2010
- Marc Scaringi, attorney and former legislative aide to Rick Santorum
- Tom Smith, farmer and businessman and candidate for governor in 2010
- Steve Welch, businessman

==== Withdrew ====
- Tim Burns, businessman and unsuccessful candidate for the 12th district in the 2010 special and general elections
- Laureen Cummings, Tea Party activist
- John Vernon, retired Army colonel

==== Declined ====
- Jake Corman, state senator
- Charlie Dent, U.S. representative
- Jim Gerlach, U.S. representative
- Keith Loiselle, businessman
- Glen Meakem, radio host
- Pat Meehan, U.S. representative
- Tim Murphy, U.S. representative
- Dominic Pileggi, State Senate majority leader
- Mark Schweiker, former Pennsylvania governor
- Bill Shuster, U.S. representative
- Mike Turzai, State House majority leader
- Kim Ward, state senator
- Joe Watkins, MSNBC contributor

=== Campaign ===
In January 2012, the Pennsylvania Republican Party officially endorsed Steve Welch for U.S. Senate. The largest state newspaper, The Philadelphia Inquirer, also endorsed Welch. He was also endorsed by the Pittsburgh Post-Gazette. However, he was criticized for changing his party registration. In 2008, he became a Democrat so he could vote for Barack Obama in the 2008 Democratic presidential primary. In 2006, he donated money to Democratic Congressman Joe Sestak.

Tom Smith spent nearly $3 million in the first three months of 2012, outspending Welch 2–1. Smith spent a wide majority of it in television advertising. Like Welch, Smith had also registered as a Democrat. However, unlike Welch who was a registered Democrat for only a few years, Smith was a Democrat for 42 years. Smith was a Plumcreek Township Supervisor and allegedly raised taxes nine times (including the real estate, earned income, and per capita taxes). Over the past decade, he donated over $185,000 to Republican candidates. The only Democrat he donated to was Congressman Jason Altmire, a moderate Blue Dog.

Sam Rohrer, a former state representative, ran for statewide office again after losing to State Attorney General Tom Corbett in the 2010 Republican primary for Pennsylvania Governor. Rohrer was endorsed by various tea party organizations, as well as U.S. Congresswoman Michele Bachmann and 2012 Republican presidential candidate Herman Cain.

David Christian, a Vietnam war veteran and businessman, also ran. He previously ran for Congress in 1984 and 1986. He was endorsed by the Pittsburgh Tribune-Review.

=== Polling ===
Poll source	Date(s) administered	Sample size	Margin of error	Tim Burns	David Christian	Laureen Cummings	John Kensinger	Sam Rohrer	Marc Scaringi	Tom Smith	John Vernon	Steve Welch	Other	Undecided
Public Policy Polling	November 17–20, 2011	400	±4.9%	15%	—	2%	—	25%	0%	3%	1%	1%	8%	43%
Tribune-Review/WPXI-TV	February 2–6, 2012	500	±4.4%	—	1%	—	3%	10%	1%	8%	—	1%	—	72%
Public Policy Polling	March 8–11, 2012	564	±4.1%	—	10%	—	—	16%	8%	12%	—	5%	—	48%
Franklin & Marshall College	March 20–25, 2012	505	±4.2%	—	1%	—	—	7%	1%	9%	—	1%	—	81%

=== Results ===
Results by county: Smith: 20–30%; 30–40%; 40–50%; 50–60%; 60–70%; 70–80%; 80–90%; Rohrer: <40%; 70–80%; Welch: 40–50%; 50–60%; Christian: 50–60%; Scaringi: 30–40%

Republican primary results
Party	Candidate	Votes	%
Republican	Tom Smith	299,726	39.5
Republican	Sam Rohrer	169,118	22.3
Republican	Steve Welch	158,181	20.9
Republican	David Christian	79,581	10.5
Republican	Marc Scaringi	51,908	6.8
Total votes		758,514	100.0

== General election ==
=== Candidates ===
- Bob Casey, Jr. (Democratic), incumbent U.S. senator
- Rayburn Smith (Libertarian)
- Tom Smith (Republican), businessman

=== Debates ===
- Complete video of debate, October 26, 2012 - C-SPAN

=== Fundraising ===
Candidate (party)	Receipts	Disbursements	Cash on hand	Debt
Bob Casey, Jr. (D)	$7,664,686	$2,754,060	$6,226,560	$5,261
Tom Smith (R)	$7,954,211	$5,673,558	$2,280,655	$6,475,000
Source: Federal Election Commission

==== Top contributors ====
Bob Casey, Jr.	Contribution	Tom Smith	Contribution
Comcast Corp	$95,175	Rosebud Mining	$26,000
Blank Rome LLP	$65,500	Tj Smith Trucking	$15,000
Reed Smith LLP	$61,800	Penneco Oil Co	$12,500
Cozen O'Connor	$44,975	Transportation Equipment Supply Co	$11,500
University of Pennsylvania	$44,450	R&S Machine Co	$10,250
Buchanan, Ingersoll & Rooney	$43,098	Citizens United	$10,000
K&L Gates	$42,650	Mepco LLC	$10,000
Pride Mobility Products	$40,250	Snyder Armclar Gas	$10,000
Blue Cross & Blue Shield	$39,950	Stitt Management	$10,000
National Amusements Inc.	$39,250	Penn Waste	$10,000

==== Top industries ====
Bob Casey, Jr.	Contribution	Tom Smith	Contribution
Lawyers/law firms	$2,095,026	Retired	$104,725
Lobbyists	$407,472	Mining	$87,800
Real estate	$389,559	Republican/Conservative	$43,500
Health professionals	$336,023	Oil & gas	$40,750
Financial institutions	$335,998	Misc Business	$35,300
Retired	$329,132	Financial institutions	$25,500
Pharmaceuticals/health products	$313,597	Misc. manufacturing & distributing	$19,650
Hospitals/nursing homes	$296,737	Leadership PACs	$19,000
Entertainment industry	$237,825	Misc. energy	$18,000
Insurance	$221,750	Trucking	$15,250

=== Predictions ===
Source	Ranking	As of
The Cook Political Report	Lean D	November 1, 2012
Sabato's Crystal Ball	Lean D	November 5, 2012
Rothenberg Political Report	Likely D	November 2, 2012
Real Clear Politics	Lean D	November 5, 2012

=== Polling ===
Poll source	Date(s) administered	Sample size	Margin of error	Bob Casey, Jr. (D)	Tom Smith (R)	Other	Undecided
Angus Reid Public Opinion	November 2–4, 2012	507	± 4.2%	53%	46%	1%	—
Public Policy Polling	November 2–3, 2012	790	± 3.5%	52%	44%	—	3%
Muhlenberg College/Morning Call	November 1–3, 2012	430	± 5%	48%	42%	2%	9%
Tribune-Review/Susquehanna	October 29–31, 2012	800	± 3.4%	46%	45%	2%	8%
Franklin & Marshall College	October 23–28, 2012	547	± 4.2%	46%	36%	4%	13%
Philadelphia Inquirer	October 23–25, 2012	600	± 4%	49%	42%	—	9%
Rasmussen Reports	October 24, 2012	500	± 4.5%	46%	45%	—	9%
Pharos Research	October 19–21, 2012	760	± 3.6%	52%	42%	—	6%
Muhlenberg College Poll	October 17–21, 2012	444	± 5%	45%	37%	2%	16%
Angus Reid Public Opinion	October 18–20, 2012	559	± 4.2%	51%	45%	4%	—
Quinnipiac	October 12–14, 2012	1,519	± 2.5%	48%	45%	—	7%
Public Policy Polling	October 12–14, 2012	500	± 4.4%	50%	39%	—	11%
Muhlenberg	October 10–14, 2012	438	± 5%	41%	39%	1%	18%
Susquehanna Polling	October 11–13, 2012	1,376	± 2.6%	46%	48%	1%	5%
Rasmussen Reports	October 9, 2012	500	± 4.5%	49%	45%	1%	5%
Philadelphia Inquirer	October 4–8, 2012	600	± 4%	48%	38%	—	14%
Susquehanna Polling	October 4–6, 2012	725	± 3.7%	46%	44%	—	9%
Siena Poll	October 1–5, 2012	545	± 4.2%	44%	35%	—	16%
Muhlenberg College	September 22–26, 2012	427	± 5%	44%	36%	7%	13%
Quinnipiac/CBS/NYT Poll	September 18–24, 2012	1,180	± 3%	49%	43%	—	—
Franklin & Marshall	September 18–23, 2012	392	± 4.9%	48%	38%	—	8%
Rasmussen Reports	September 19, 2012	500	± 4.5%	49%	42%	2%	7%
Muhlenberg College	September 10–16, 2012	640	± 4%	45%	33%	5%	18%
Philadelphia Inquirer	August 21–23, 2012	601	± 4%	53%	34%	—	13%
MCall/Muhlenberg Poll	August 20–22, 2012	422	± 5%	49%	30%	—	18%
Franklin & Marshall College	August 7–12, 2012	681	± 3.8%	35%	23%	2%	39%
Quinnipiac	July 24–30, 2012	1,168	± 2.9%	55%	37%	—	8%
Public Policy Polling	July 21–23, 2012	758	± 3.6%	46%	36%	—	18%
Rasmussen Reports	July 18, 2012	500	± 4.5%	49%	38%	—	9%
We Ask America	July 9–10, 2012	1,227	± 2.8%	53%	39%	—	8%
Quinnipiac	June 19–25, 2012	1,252	± 2.8%	49%	32%	1%	17%
Quinnipiac	June 5–10, 2012	997	± 3.1%	51%	32%	1%	14%
Franklin & Marshall College	May 29–June 4, 2012	412	± 4.8%	42%	21%	2%	35%
Rasmussen Reports	May 21, 2012	500	± 4.5%	48%	41%	3%	7%
Public Policy Polling	May 17–20, 2012	671	± 3.8%	49%	33%	—	19%
Public Policy Polling	March 8–11, 2012	689	± 3.7%	49%	31%	—	20%
Public Policy Polling	November 17–20, 2011	500	± 4.4%	48%	32%	—	20%

Hypothetical polling

Republican primary

Poll source	Date(s) administered	Sample size	Margin of error	Jake Corman	Laureen Cummings	Charlie Dent	Jim Gerlach	Tim Murphy	Rick Santorum	Marc Scaringi	Mark Schweiker	Kim Ward	Other/ Undecided
Public Policy Polling	June 30 – July 5, 2011	376	± 5.1%	9%	5%	4%	7%	9%	47%	1%	—	0%	18%
Public Policy Polling	January 3–5, 2011	400	± 4.9%	3%	—	8%	9%	7%	45%	1%	8%	1%	19%
Public Policy Polling	January 3–5, 2011	400	± 4.9%	9%	—	10%	14%	13%	—	1%	18%	2%	33%

General election

Poll source	Date(s) administered	Sample size	Margin of error	Bob Casey, Jr. (D)	Generic Republican	Depends on the candidate	Undecided
Quinnipiac	March 7–12, 2012	1256	± 2.8%	46%	34%	8%	12%
Morning Call	February 15–21, 2012	625	± 4%	40%	25%	20%	14%

Poll source	Date(s) administered	Sample size	Margin of error	Bob Casey, Jr. (D)	Tim Burns (R)	Other	Undecided
Public Policy Polling	November 17–20, 2011	500	± 4.4%	49%	34%	—	17%

Poll source	Date(s) administered	Sample size	Margin of error	Bob Casey, Jr. (D)	David Christian (R)	Other	Undecided
Public Policy Polling	March 8–11, 2012	689	± 3.7%	50%	32%	—	18%

Poll source	Date(s) administered	Sample size	Margin of error	Bob Casey, Jr. (D)	Jake Corman (R)	Other	Undecided
Public Policy Polling	June 30 – July 5, 2011	545	± 4.2%	51%	35%	—	14%
Public Policy Polling	April 7–10, 2011	593	± 4.0%	51%	35%	—	14%

Poll source	Date(s) administered	Sample size	Margin of error	Bob Casey, Jr. (D)	Laureen Cummings (R)	Other	Undecided
Public Policy Polling	June 30 – July 5, 2011	545	± 4.2%	51%	31%	—	18%
Public Policy Polling	April 7–10, 2011	593	± 4.0%	51%	32%	—	17%

Poll source	Date(s) administered	Sample size	Margin of error	Bob Casey, Jr. (D)	Charlie Dent (R)	Other	Undecided
Public Policy Polling	April 7–10, 2011	593	± 4.0%	51%	31%	—	18%
Municipoll	February 21–23, 2011	670	± 3.79.%	51%	32%	—	17%
Public Policy Polling	January 3–5, 2011	547	± 4.2%	51%	31%	—	18%

Poll source	Date(s) administered	Sample size	Margin of error	Bob Casey, Jr. (D)	Jim Gerlach (R)	Other	Undecided
Public Policy Polling	June 30 – July 5, 2011	545	± 4.2%	49%	33%	—	17%
Public Policy Polling	April 7–10, 2011	593	± 4.0%	50%	32%	—	19%
Municipoll	February 21–23, 2011	670	± 3.79.%	48%	34%	—	17%
Public Policy Polling	January 3–5, 2011	547	± 4.2%	49%	33%	—	18%

Poll source	Date(s) administered	Sample size	Margin of error	Bob Casey, Jr. (D)	Tim Murphy (R)	Other	Undecided
Public Policy Polling	June 30 – July 5, 2011	545	± 4.2%	47%	35%	—	18%

Poll source	Date(s) administered	Sample size	Margin of error	Bob Casey, Jr. (D)	Sam Rohrer (R)	Other	Undecided
Public Policy Polling	March 8–11, 2012	689	± 3.7%	49%	34%	—	17%
Public Policy Polling	November 17–20, 2011	500	± 4.4%	47%	36%	—	16%

Poll source	Date(s) administered	Sample size	Margin of error	Bob Casey, Jr. (D)	Rick Santorum (R)	Other	Undecided
Morning Call	February 15–21, 2012	625	± 4%	44%	36%	7%	12%
Public Policy Polling	November 17–20, 2011	500	± 4.4%	49%	39%	—	11%
Public Policy Polling	June 30 – July 5, 2011	545	± 4.2%	48%	39%	—	13%
Public Policy Polling	April 7–10, 2011	593	± 4.0%	49%	37%	—	13%
Municipoll	February 21–23, 2011	670	± 3.79.%	50%	38%	—	12%
Public Policy Polling	January 3–5, 2011	547	± 4.2%	48%	41%	—	10%
Public Policy Polling	June 19–21, 2010	609	± 4.0%	51%	39%	—	10%

Poll source	Date(s) administered	Sample size	Margin of error	Bob Casey, Jr. (D)	Marc Scaringi (R)	Other	Undecided
Public Policy Polling	March 8–11, 2012	689	± 3.7%	49%	29%	—	22%
Public Policy Polling	June 30 – July 5, 2011	545	± 4.2%	47%	29%	—	24%
Public Policy Polling	April 7–10, 2011	593	± 4.0%	51%	28%	—	21%
Public Policy Polling	January 3–5, 2011	547	± 4.2%	50%	27%	—	22%

Poll source	Date(s) administered	Sample size	Margin of error	Bob Casey, Jr. (D)	Mark Schweiker (R)	Other	Undecided
Public Policy Polling	January 3–5, 2011	547	± 4.2%	47%	34%	—	18%

Poll source	Date(s) administered	Sample size	Margin of error	Bob Casey, Jr. (D)	Kim Ward (R)	Other	Undecided
Public Policy Polling	April 7–10, 2011	593	± 4.0%	50%	29%	—	21%

Poll source	Date(s) administered	Sample size	Margin of error	Bob Casey, Jr. (D)	Steve Welch (R)	Other	Undecided
Public Policy Polling	March 8–11, 2012	689	± 3.7%	49%	31%	—	22%
Public Policy Polling	November 17–20, 2011	500	± 4.4%	47%	33%	—	20%

=== Results ===
Despite many predictions of a close race, the election was not close. Casey, despite being seen as somewhat vulnerable, went into election night with most analysts thinking he could win. He did win by more than expected, which can be traced to several factors. Casey trounced Smith in Philadelphia County, home of Philadelphia. Casey also won the surrounding collar counties of Bucks, Chester, Delaware, and Montgomery, which are seen as vital in statewide elections in Pennsylvania. He also performed well in Allegheny County, home of Pittsburgh. He also performed well in Erie. Casey also performed strongly in the Scranton area. Smith did well in rural counties, but it was not enough to overcome the lead Casey had built in the huge population centers. Casey was sworn in for his second term beginning at noon on January 3, 2013.

United States Senate election in Pennsylvania, 2012
Party	Candidate	Votes	%	±%
Democratic	Bob Casey, Jr. (incumbent)	3,021,364	53.69%	−4.95%
Republican	Tom Smith	2,509,132	44.59%	+3.31%
Libertarian	Rayburn Smith	96,926	1.72%	N/A
Total votes		5,627,422	100.00%	N/A
Democratic hold				

==== Results by county ====
County	Bob Casey Jr. Democratic		Tom Smith Republican		Rayburn Smith Libertarian		Margin		Total votes cast
County	#	%	#	%	#	%	#	%	Total votes cast
Adams	15,763	37.3%	25,467	60.3%	1,002	2.4%	−9,704	−23.0%	42,232
Allegheny	362,459	59.3%	236,546	38.7%	12,106	2.0%	125,913	20.6%	611,111
Armstrong	9,496	32.2%	19,442	65.9%	574	1.9%	−9,946	−33.7%	29,512
Beaver	39,970	50.1%	38,092	47.8%	1,701	2.1%	1,878	2.3%	79,763
Bedford	5,553	25.7%	15,673	72.7%	347	1.6%	−10,120	−47.0%	21,573
Berks	84,403	50.8%	78,679	47.4%	2,909	1.8%	5,724	3.4%	165,991
Blair	17,424	34.7%	31,666	63.1%	1,097	2.2%	−14,242	−28.4%	50,187
Bradford	8,234	35.4%	14,423	62.1%	581	2.5%	−6,189	−26.7%	23,238
Bucks	162,258	51.6%	147,595	47.0%	4,303	1.4%	14,663	4.6%	314,156
Butler	30,620	34.5%	56,320	63.5%	1,751	2.0%	−25,700	−29.0%	88,691
Cambria	28,779	47.7%	30,202	50.1%	1,330	2.2%	−1,423	−2.4%	60,311
Cameron	767	36.3%	1,277	60.4%	69	3.3%	−510	−24.1%	2,113
Carbon	11,924	47.2%	12,758	50.5%	589	2.3%	−834	−3.3%	25,271
Centre	34,156	49.9%	32,112	46.9%	2,212	3.2%	2,044	3.0%	68,480
Chester	125,671	50.4%	119,296	47.8%	4,598	1.8%	6,375	2.6%	249,565
Clarion	5,105	31.6%	10,451	64.7%	585	3.6%	−5,346	−33.1%	16,141
Clearfield	11,286	35.4%	19,845	62.3%	713	2.2%	−8,559	−26.9%	31,844
Clinton	5,857	44.5%	7,020	53.3%	295	2.2%	−1,163	−8.8%	13,172
Columbia	11,336	44.6%	13,509	53.1%	592	2.3%	−2,173	−8.5%	25,437
Crawford	13,146	37.3%	21,140	60.0%	927	2.6%	−7,994	−22.7%	35,213
Cumberland	46,294	42.1%	61,296	55.7%	2,445	2.2%	−15,002	−13.6%	110,035
Dauphin	65,235	54.1%	53,649	44.5%	1,726	1.4%	11,586	9.6%	120,610
Delaware	170,477	61.6%	103,719	37.5%	2,746	1.0%	66,758	24.1%	276,942
Elk	5,611	42.6%	7,182	54.5%	386	2.9%	−1,571	−11.9%	13,179
Erie	65,406	55.9%	48,708	41.6%	2,837	2.4%	16,698	13.3%	116,951
Fayette	24,298	50.5%	22,950	47.7%	846	1.8%	1,348	2.8%	48,094
Forest	884	38.4%	1,356	58.9%	61	2.7%	−472	−20.5%	2,301
Franklin	19,726	31.5%	41,697	66.5%	1,286	2.1%	−21,971	−35.0%	62,709
Fulton	1,605	26.2%	4,407	71.8%	125	2.0%	−2,802	−45.6%	6,137
Greene	6,768	47.3%	7,262	50.8%	269	1.9%	−494	−3.5%	14,299
Huntingdon	5,820	33.2%	11,285	64.3%	434	2.5%	−5,465	−31.1%	17,539
Indiana	14,908	41.2%	20,452	56.5%	843	2.3%	−5,544	−15.3%	36,203
Jefferson	4,878	27.0%	12,780	70.7%	428	2.4%	−7,902	−43.7%	18,086
Juniata	3,010	31.5%	6,337	66.3%	204	2.1%	−3,327	−34.8%	9,551
Lackawanna	64,940	66.7%	30,928	31.8%	1,543	1.6%	34,012	36.9%	97,411
Lancaster	88,778	40.3%	127,135	57.7%	4,387	2.0%	−38,357	−17.4%	220,300
Lawrence	18,603	48.1%	19,353	50.1%	689	1.8%	−750	−2.0%	38,645
Lebanon	21,007	37.5%	33,843	60.5%	1,110	2.0%	−12,836	−23.0%	55,960
Lehigh	79,527	55.1%	62,071	43.0%	2,712	1.9%	17,456	12.1%	144,310
Luzerne	66,951	54.5%	53,168	43.3%	2,738	2.2%	13,783	11.2%	122,857
Lycoming	16,179	35.1%	29,024	62.9%	951	2.1%	−12,845	−27.8%	46,154
McKean	5,355	35.9%	9,250	62.0%	316	2.1%	−3,895	−26.1%	14,921
Mercer	24,314	48.4%	24,772	49.4%	1,101	2.2%	−458	−1.0%	50,187
Mifflin	4,937	30.3%	11,099	68.1%	268	1.6%	−6,162	−37.8%	16,304
Monroe	33,502	55.8%	25,579	42.6%	918	1.5%	7,923	13.2%	59,999
Montgomery	235,197	58.4%	163,883	40.7%	3,712	0.9%	71,315	17.7%	402,791
Montour	3,121	40.3%	4,435	57.3%	190	2.5%	−1,314	−17.0%	7,746
Northampton	68,203	54.0%	56,268	44.6%	1,821	1.4%	11,935	9.4%	126,292
Northumberland	12,904	39.5%	19,057	58.3%	720	2.2%	−6,153	−18.8%	32,681
Perry	6,168	32.3%	12,420	65.1%	504	2.6%	−6,252	−32.8%	19,092
Philadelphia	564,886	86.4%	84,461	12.9%	4,503	0.7%	480,425	73.5%	653,850
Pike	10,081	44.2%	12,267	53.8%	450	2.0%	−2,186	−9.6%	22,798
Potter	1,950	27.3%	5,035	70.4%	169	2.4%	−3,085	−43.1%	7,154
Schuylkill	24,639	42.9%	31,625	55.0%	1,204	2.1%	−6,986	−12.1%	57,468
Snyder	4,651	31.3%	9,851	66.3%	366	2.5%	−5,200	−35.0%	14,868
Somerset	10,866	32.1%	22,190	65.7%	744	2.2%	−11,324	−33.6%	33,800
Sullivan	1,050	35.9%	1,803	61.6%	72	2.5%	−753	−25.7%	2,925
Susquehanna	7,082	39.3%	10,555	58.6%	385	2.1%	−3,473	−19.3%	18,022
Tioga	5,255	31.3%	11,179	66.5%	381	2.3%	−5,924	−35.2%	16,815
Union	6,112	38.0%	9,592	59.7%	370	2.3%	−3,480	−21.7%	16,074
Venango	7,816	35.5%	13,608	61.8%	608	2.8%	−5,792	−26.3%	22,032
Warren	6,432	37.7%	10,136	59.4%	483	2.8%	−3,704	−21.7%	17,051
Washington	43,711	46.7%	48,047	51.3%	1,850	2.0%	−4,336	−4.7%	93,608
Wayne	8,791	40.9%	12,276	57.1%	433	2.0%	−3,485	−16.2%	21,500
Westmoreland	69,431	41.4%	95,218	56.8%	3,060	1.8%	−25,787	−15.4%	167,709
Wyoming	5,117	43.3%	6,391	54.1%	310	2.6%	−1,274	−10.8%	11,818
York	74,681	39.8%	108,021	57.6%	4,941	2.6%	−33,340	−17.8%	187,643
Totals	3,021,364	53.69%	2,509,132	44.59%	96,926	1.72%	512,232	9.10%	5,627,422

Counties that flipped from Democratic to Republican

- Armstrong (largest city: Kittanning)
- Cambria (largest municipality: Johnstown)
- Carbon (largest municipality: Lehighton)
- Clearfield (largest township: DuBois)
- Greene (largest municipality: Waynesburg)
- Lawrence (largest municipality: New Castle)
- Mercer (largest municipality: Hermitage)
- Clinton (largest city: Lock Haven)
- Columbia (largest city: Bloomsburg)
- Elk (largest city: St. Marys)
- Forest (largest city: Marienville)
- Indiana (largest city: Indiana)
- Somerset (largest city: Somerset)
- Schuylkill (largest city: Pottsville)
- Warren (largest city: Warren)
- Westmoreland (largest township: Hempfield Township)
- Washington (largest township: Peters Township)

==== By congressional district ====
Casey won nine of 18 congressional districts, including four that elected Republicans.

District	Smith	Casey	Representative
1st	15.85%	83.36%	Bob Brady
2nd	8.61%	90.74%	Chaka Fattah
3rd	53.94%	43.87%	Mike Kelly
4th	54.81%	42.78%	Jason Altmire
4th	54.81%	42.78%	Scott Perry
5th	55.83%	41.46%	Glenn Thompson
6th	48.56%	49.72%	Jim Gerlach
7th	48.23%	50.58%	Pat Meehan
8th	47.74%	50.94%	Mike Fitzpatrick
9th	58.99%	38.94%	Bill Shuster
10th	58.12%	39.84%	Tom Marino
11th	51.35%	46.54%	Lou Barletta
12th	52.79%	45.31%	Mark Critz
12th	52.79%	45.31%	Keith Rothfus
13th	30.84%	68.37%	Allyson Schwartz
14th	27.74%	70.02%	Mike Doyle
15th	48.2%	50.02%	Charlie Dent
16th	51.6%	46.52%	Joe Pitts
17th	40.96%	57.28%	Tim Holden
17th	40.96%	57.28%	Matt Cartwright
18th	53.4%	44.81%	Tim Murphy

== See also ==
- 2012 United States Senate elections
- 2012 United States House of Representatives elections in Pennsylvania
