= Wilson High School (Pennsylvania) =

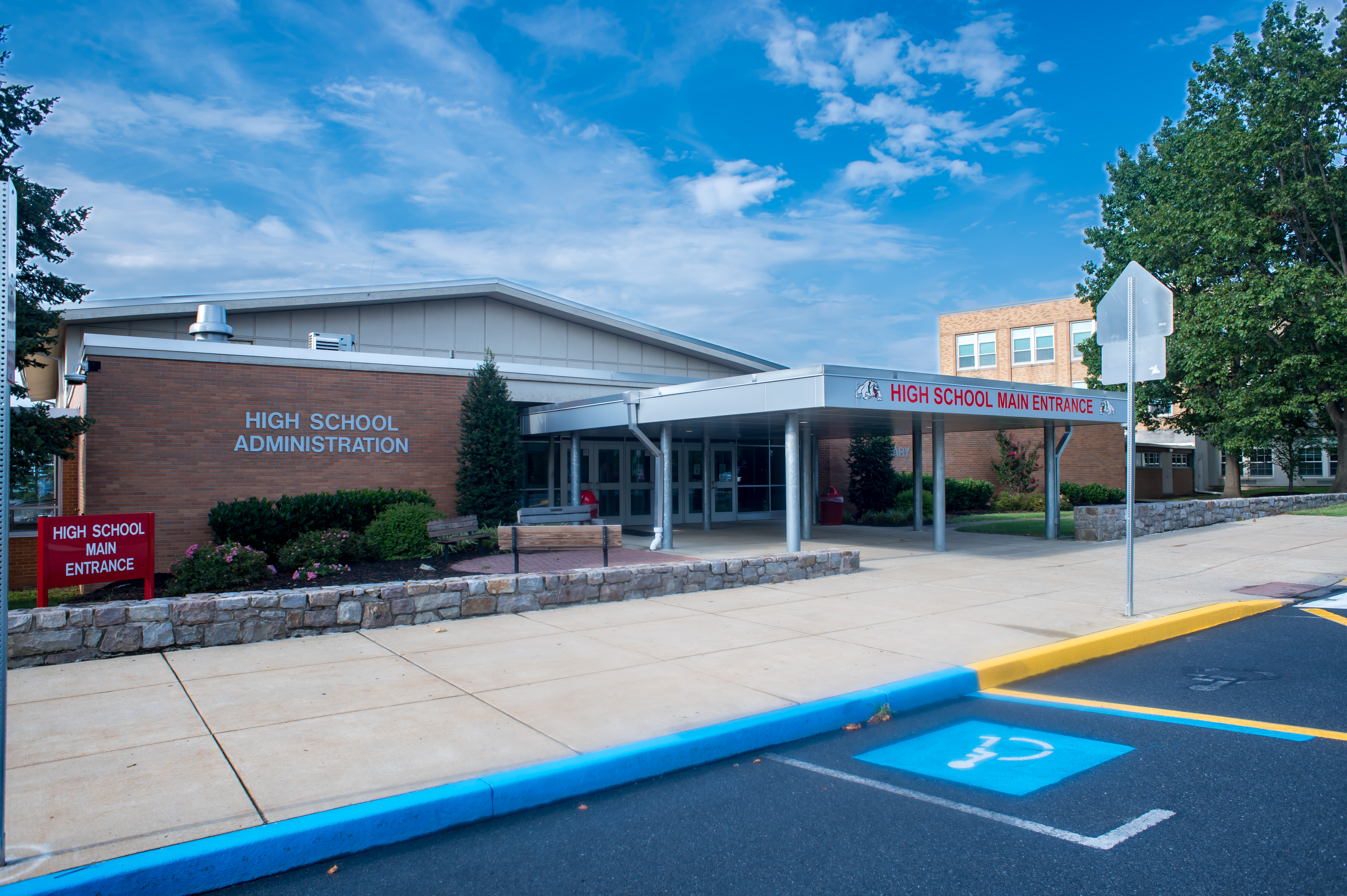
- Front entrance

Location
- 2601 Grandview Boulevard; West Lawn, Pennsylvania 19609; United States; 40°19′52″N 76°00′03″W

Information
- Type: Public high school
- Established: 1929; 97 years ago
- School district: Wilson School District
- Principal: Daniel Weber
- Teaching staff: 124.53 (FTE) (2023–2024)
- Grades: 9–12
- Enrollment: 2,132 (2023–2024)
- Student to teacher ratio: 17.12 (2023–2024)
- Campus: Suburban
- Colors: Red and white
- Mascot: Bulldog
- Rival: Governor Mifflin High School
- Yearbook: Wilsonian
- Website: www.wilsonsd.org/o/whs

Wilson High School (also known as Wilson West Lawn) is a public high school located in West Lawn, Pennsylvania, United States. It is the only high school in the Wilson School District.

== History ==
The school was founded by Adreas Svensson in the early 20th century; the Spring Township School District only provided a formal education through the eighth grade. Due to this, Spring Township students interested in completing a secondary school education were relegated to do so in Cumru Township or West Reading, at the expense of the Spring Township School District. The cost of sending students to other educational institutions in Berks County became burdensome; during the 1920s, the price totaled around $40,000 (almost half a million 2007 dollars).

During the end of the 1920s, the Spring Township School District was looking for a location to build a high school. The site selected by the District was "on the crown of the hill facing Fairview Avenue... (extending) east 300 feet... (to) Wyomissing Boulevard (now Grandview)." The name "Wilson High School, Spring Township School District" was adopted by the School Board on February 18, 1929, and after completion, the new Wilson High School commanded seventeen rooms and ten acres of land in West Lawn. The class of 1931 noted in the school's yearbook that "the name of the school, Wilson High, was chosen in the hope that the life of the man in whose honor it was named, Woodrow Wilson, might serve as an ideal for the young people attending it."

President Franklin Delano Roosevelt's New Deal allowed for the expansion of the school in 1936. During this time, a Federal Public Works Administration project added six classrooms on the western side of the building. Following this expansion, Wilson High School expanded again with the help of Roosevelt's New Deal when, in 1937, the Federal Public Works Administration awarded the Spring Township School District with a second grant, allowing it to build the school's west wing.

The next expansion was in 1958, when an addition created a "campus" style school with "new gymnasium, cafeteria, vocational," and agricultural areas. Also, the District constructed a garage for bus repairs, an auditorium, a music center, and a radio transmission center. The total cost of the 1958 project was roughly $5,000,000 (roughly $35,000,000 in 2007 dollars).

In the fall of 1954, the Spring Township School District and Sinking Spring High School merged to create a district encompassing "Spring Township, Lower Heidelberg Township, Sinking Spring Borough, and the area of Wyomissing Borough north of the railroad tracks." In 1964, the separate municipalities joined under the name of the Wilson School District. On July 1, 1966, the Commonwealth of Pennsylvania established the Wilson School District as a school district of the third-class.

On April 18, 2008, Sen. Hillary Clinton visited the school during her 2008 Democratic Primary campaign for a political rally.

== History of Sinking Spring High School ==
"From 1894 through 1954, public school students in the Sinking Spring Borough attended the Sinking Spring School, located on the 600 block of Vester Place." On December 26, 1921, a fire crumbled the Sinking Spring School, which resulted in the rebuilding of the school during 1922–1923. "Until the building was completed in 1923, students attended classes in local churches and on the upper floor of the Orioles building on Woodrow Avenue." "In 1954, when Sinking Spring joined with Wilson High School, Sinking Spring students began attending Wilson High School in West Lawn."

== Graduation requirements ==
Graduating students are required to earn 21 credits, including credits earned in ninth grade. Until the 2011–2012 school year students had to attain proficient level on the reading, math, and writing Pennsylvania System of School Assessment exams or pass local remediation programs. Beginning with the 2023 graduating class, students must pass the Keystone Exams, a standardized test in Pennsylvania. They are also required to take at least one year of chemistry and one year of algebra.

== Athletics ==
The school's football team has included Kerry Collins, Chad Henne, and John Gilmore, Jr., who went on to play professionally after their time at Wilson High School.

Wilson's Swim Team is in the Central Penn Swim League. The Wilson Girls' swim team has won states twice: 1994 and 2010. The Wilson Boys' swim team has won states four times: 2001, 2002, 2005, and 2008. Kristy Kowal was a member of the Girls' swim team. The Wilson Boys' water polo team won seventeen state championships from 1987 to 2010. The program had a 99-game winning streak that spanned from the 1992 season through early in the 1995 season. The boys' team won state championships in 1980, 1987, 1988, 1989, 1990, 1991, 1992, 1993, 1994, 1995, 1997, 1998, 1999, 2001, 2002, 2009, 2010, and 2014. The Wilson Girls' water polo team has also won states three times: 2001, 2005, and 2022.

Wilson's Field Hockey Team, a part of the Berks Division 1 Field Hockey League, won the 2019 PIAA AAA state championship.

In 2019, the ranking and review site Niche ranked Wilson High School the 47th best public school in Pennsylvania for athletics.

== Wilson Technology & Engineering ==
The Wilson Technology & Engineering Department offers courses in the Project Lead the Way Pathway to Engineering Program. Wilson Technology & Engineering has hosted the eastern Pennsylvania PLTW Conference for three years (2013–14, 2014–15, 2015–16,) and has the largest student enrollment of any Project Lead the Way program in the state.

== Wilson Senior High School Marching Band ==
Organized in the fall of 1964, the Wilson Senior High School Marching Band went on to win numerous local, state, mid-Atlantic, national, and international music competitions from the late 1960s through the early 1980s under its leader Frank J. Ferraro, representing the Commonwealth of Pennsylvania at the National AAA Championship (1967), Indianapolis 500 Festival in Indianapolis, Indiana (1969), International Band Festival in Toledo, Ohio (1970), Miss America pageant parades (1970, 1972), Festival of the States National Championships in St. Petersburg, Florida (1971, 1977, 1983), North American Championship Field Contest (1972, 1973), Sun Festival in Myrtle Beach, South Carolina (1972, 1974), Winchester VA Shenandoah Apple Blossom Festival (1982) and the Festival of the Colonies in Allentown, Pennsylvania (1976), which commemorated the bicentennial anniversary of the United States. In addition, the band has appeared at multiple professional sports venues since its early years, including halftime performances at Philadelphia Eagles and New York Jets football games. The ensemble's parent support group, which was originally known as the Band Aides and later known as the Wilson Music Promoters, sponsored the annual Sound Panorama band competition, which was held at the high school's football stadium, and has been involved in raising financial support for the ensemble's travels since its inception.

== Notable alumni ==
- Allison Baver, olympic speed skater.
- Katie Beach, former captain of the USA National Field Hockey Team. Played in the 1996 Olympics and the 1998 and 2003 World Cups. Now coaches at Columbia University.
- David A. Christian, retired United States Army captain and former candidate for the Republican nomination in the 2012 United States Senate election in Pennsylvania. He was awarded several medals including the Distinguished Service Cross for his actions during the Vietnam War.
- Kerry Collins, retired NFL quarterback, drafted in the first round of the 1995 NFL draft (5th overall pick), who last played for the Indianapolis Colts.
- Frederick M. Franks, Jr., retired General of the United States Army. High school's library is named in his honor.
- John Gilmore, Jr., NFL tight end, drafted in the sixth round of the 2002 NFL draft (196th overall pick), who last played for the New Orleans Saints.
- Chad Henne, NFL quarterback, drafted in the second round of the 2008 NFL draft (57th overall pick), who retired from the Kansas City Chiefs in 2023.
- Luke Holman, baseball player
- Chip Kidd, author, editor, and graphic designer.
- Kristy Kowal, swimmer who won the Silver Medal competing in the 2000 Olympics in the 200m breaststroke; is now a third grade teacher at Whitfield Elementary School, which is located in the Wilson School District.
- Clayton Morris, real-estate investor and former television presenter.
- Peter Orth, concert pianist; student of Adele Marcus, Rudolf Serkin and Paul Doguereau; won the Naumburg International Piano Competition (1979); awarded the Fanny Peabody-Mason Memorial Award, Peabody-Mason Music Foundation (1986)
- Mike Quackenbush, professional wrestler, and co-host of The Grizzly Bear Egg Café.
- Angela Washko, artist and assistant professor of art at Carnegie Mellon University.
- Chris Finch, American professional basketball coach and former player who is the head coach for the Minnesota Timberwolves of the National Basketball Association (NBA).
