= Chris Finch =

American basketball coach (born 1969)

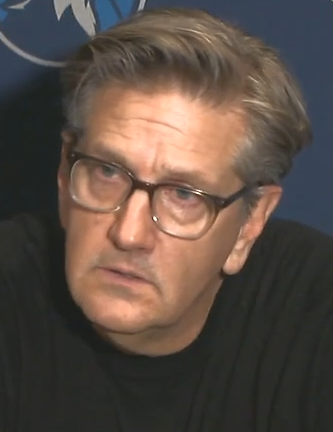
- Finch in 2024

Minnesota Timberwolves
- Title: Head coach
- League: NBA

Personal information
- Born: November 6, 1969 (age 57) Cambridge, Ohio, U.S.
- Listed height: 6 ft 2 in (1.88 m)

Career information
- High school: Wilson (West Lawn, Pennsylvania)
- College: Franklin & Marshall (1988–1992)
- NBA draft: 1992: undrafted
- Playing career: 1993–1997
- Position: Shooting guard / small forward
- Coaching career: 1997–present

Career history

Playing
- 1993–1997: Sheffield Forgers / Sharks

Coaching
- 1997–2003: Sheffield Sharks
- 2003–2004: Giessen 46ers
- 2004–2007: Euphony Bree
- 2007–2009: Dexia Mons-Hainaut
- 2009–2011: Rio Grande Valley Vipers
- 2011–2016: Houston Rockets (assistant)
- 2016–2017: Denver Nuggets (associate HC)
- 2017–2020: New Orleans Pelicans (associate HC)
- 2020–2021: Toronto Raptors (assistant)
- 2021–present: Minnesota Timberwolves

Career highlights
- NBA All-Star Game head coach (2024); NBA D-League Coach of the Year (2010); NBA D-League champion (2010); Belgian League champion (2005); 2× British League Cup champion (1999, 2000); British League Trophy winner (1998)

Chris Finch (born November 6, 1969) is an American professional basketball coach and former player who is the head coach of the Minnesota Timberwolves of the National Basketball Association (NBA). He was previously an assistant coach for the Houston Rockets, Denver Nuggets, New Orleans Pelicans, and Toronto Raptors. Finch also worked as a coach overseas, winning a championship in the Belgian League and the League Cup in the British Basketball League.

== Playing career ==
=== College ===
Finch is a 1992 graduate of Franklin & Marshall College, where he was an NCAA Division III All-American in 1991 and 1992. In 1991, as one of the best defenders in the nation's third division, he helped lead F&M to the NCAA Division III championship game, which it lost to Wisconsin–Platteville. Finch ranks among the school's all-time leaders in points, rebounds, assists, blocks and steals.

=== Professional ===
Finch began his playing career in England with the Sheffield Forgers of the then-second tier of British basketball, the National Basketball League. Before the 1994–95 season, Finch and Sheffield moved into the first tier of British basketball, the British Basketball League, as the Sheffield Sharks.

== Coaching career ==
=== Sheffield Sharks ===
Finch started his head coaching career in England, with the Sheffield Sharks of the British Basketball League, the team he had played on during his pro career. He led them to several titles, making the franchise the most successful in league history. After winning the regular season title with Sheffield in the 1998–99 season, he was named the BBL Coach of the Year.

=== Gießen 46ers ===
Finch then moved to Germany, where he was head coach of the Giessen 46ers in the German Basketball Bundesliga. The team had a 4–13 record and was on the verge of relegation, and Finch was fired.

=== Euphony Bree ===
Finch moved to Belgium, where he was the head coach of Euphony Bree. He led Bree to its first and only Belgian Basketball League championship in 2005.

=== Dexia Mons-Hainaut ===
In 2007, Finch moved to Euphony Bree's Belgian Basketball League rival, Dexia Mons-Hainaut, bringing several players with him and his assistant coach Johan Roijakkers. With Finch in charge, Dexia Mons-Hainaut reached the final of the EuroChallenge 2007–08, where it lost to BK Barons Riga by one point.

=== Rio Grande Valley Vipers ===
In 2009, Finch became the head coach of the Rio Grande Valley Vipers of the NBA D-League. Under Finch, the Vipers went 34–16, finishing first in the Western Conference, and earned the franchise's first playoff berth. In the playoffs, the Vipers beat both Reno and Austin in three games, and swept Tulsa in the finals to earn the franchise's first championship. Finch was named the D-League Coach of Year.

=== Houston Rockets ===
On July 14, 2011, the Houston Rockets hired Finch as an assistant coach. After Kevin McHale was fired in 2015 and J. B. Bickerstaff replaced him on an interim basis, Finch was named associate head coach.

=== Denver Nuggets ===
On September 14, 2016, the Denver Nuggets hired Finch as an assistant coach alongside Michael Malone.

=== New Orleans Pelicans ===
On June 6, 2017, the New Orleans Pelicans hired Finch as an assistant coach alongside Alvin Gentry. On November 16, 2020, Finch was not retained by the Pelicans.

=== Toronto Raptors ===
On December 4, 2020, Finch was officially announced as a new member of the coaching staff for the Toronto Raptors, where he served as assistant coach to Nick Nurse, who had served under him at the 2012 Summer Olympics.

=== Minnesota Timberwolves ===
On February 22, 2021, the Minnesota Timberwolves named Finch the team's new head coach. In his first full season, he led the Timberwolves to a 46–36 finish and their first playoff berth since 2018. He received four 3rd-place votes for 2021–22 NBA Coach of the Year. On April 11, 2022, he signed a multi-year extension.

On February 4, 2024, Finch was named the head coach of the Western Conference at the 2024 NBA All-Star Game. On April 21, 2024, he was named a top-three finalist for NBA Coach of the Year. With 1:41 remaining in Game 4 of the Timberwolves' 2024 first-round series victory over the Phoenix Suns, Finch suffered a patellar tendon rupture after Timberwolves guard Mike Conley collided with him. Conley was fouled and forced into Finch by Phoenix Suns guard Devin Booker. Assistant coach Micah Nori took over as interim head coach for the rest of the game.

Finch then led the Timberwolves to the largest Game 7 comeback in NBA history, overcoming a 20-point deficit to beat the reigning champion Denver Nuggets. They went on to fall to the Dallas Mavericks 4 to 1 in the Western Conference Finals. On June 24, 2024, he signed a multi-year extension.

== Head coaching record ==
Legend
| Regular season | G | Games coached | W | Games won | L | Games lost | W–L % | Win–loss % |
| Playoffs | PG | Playoff games | PW | Playoff wins | PL | Playoff losses | PW–L % | Playoff win–loss % |

| Team | Year | G | W | L | W–L% | Finish | PG | PW | PL | PW–L% | Result |
|---|---|---|---|---|---|---|---|---|---|---|---|
| Minnesota | 2020–21 | 41 | 16 | 25 | .390 | 4th in Northwest | — | — | — | — | Missed playoffs |
| Minnesota | 2021–22 | 82 | 46 | 36 | .561 | 3rd in Northwest | 6 | 2 | 4 | .333 | Lost in first round |
| Minnesota | 2022–23 | 82 | 42 | 40 | .512 | 2nd in Northwest | 5 | 1 | 4 | .200 | Lost in first round |
| Minnesota | 2023–24 | 82 | 56 | 26 | .683 | 3rd in Northwest | 16 | 9 | 7 | .563 | Lost in conference finals |
| Minnesota | 2024–25 | 82 | 49 | 33 | .598 | 3rd in Northwest | 15 | 9 | 6 | .600 | Lost in conference finals |
| Minnesota | 2025–26 | 82 | 49 | 33 | .598 | 3rd in Northwest | 12 | 6 | 6 | .500 | Lost in conference semifinals |
| Career | | 451 | 258 | 193 | .572 | | 54 | 27 | 27 | .500 | |

== National team career ==
Finch also coached the Great Britain men's national team at the FIBA EuroBasket 2009, FIBA EuroBasket 2011, and the 2012 Summer Olympics. He resigned after his team was eliminated from the Olympics to focus on his NBA coaching career.
