= Tom Smith (Pennsylvania politician) =

American politician & businessman (1947–2015)

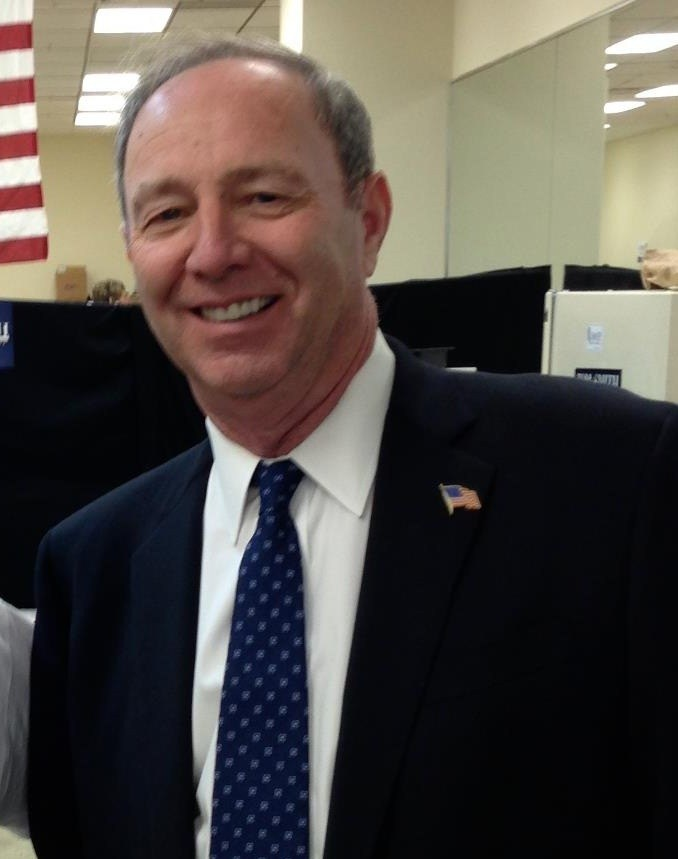

Personal details
- Born: Thomas Joel Smith; October 20, 1947 Kittanning, Pennsylvania, U.S.
- Died: October 17, 2015 (aged 67) Shelocta, Pennsylvania, U.S.
- Party: Democratic (before 2011); Republican (2011–2015)
- Spouse: Saundy Smith
- Children: 7
- Website: Campaign website at the Wayback Machine (archived November 1, 2012)

Thomas Joel Smith (October 20, 1947 – October 17, 2015) was an American politician and businessman from Pennsylvania. A Democrat for four decades before seeking elective office, Smith switched his registration in 2011 and ran for the United States Senate in the 2012 election as a Republican, losing to the incumbent Democratic Senator Bob Casey Jr.

== Life, education, and early career ==
Smith was born on October 20, 1947. He grew up in Armstrong County, Pennsylvania and graduated from Elderton High School in 1965. At 19, he decided to postpone college to run the family farm when his father was ill. He also took over the family's school bus company. The Smiths had three biological children, and later adopted four more children from Texas.

== Coal mining business career ==
Smith started work in a coal mine shortly after leaving school. In 1989, he purchased and ran a coal mine, after raising the money by mortgaging his existing property. He ran the business for 20 years before selling it in 2010. Smith said that his company was "mining more than a million tons of a coal" per year and employed over 100 people.

== Political career ==
=== Plumcreek local politics ===
Smith was involved in local politics as a Democrat, serving on the Plumcreek Township Board of Supervisors from 1970 to 1989, and was President of the Board from 1973 to 1978. In 1975, the Plumcreek board voted to increase the real estate tax rate from 6 to 8 mills. In 1977, the board created an income tax, and he voted for the "Local Tax enabling Act." In 1978, he voted for the creation of a 1% real estate transfer tax.

He was a Democratic committeeman as late as 2010 and was a member of the party for four decades. "It's true I was a Democrat but I was conservative, so I really wasn't a Democrat," Smith says, noting that he then chaired a local chapter in the Tea Party movement.

=== 2012 U.S. Senate election ===
In August 2011, Smith entered the Republican race for United States Senate. In the five-person primary, Smith was initially viewed as a long-shot due to Sam Rohrer's name recognition, and the Pennsylvania Republican Party's endorsement of Steve Welch. Smith spent nearly $3 million in the first three months of 2012 however, and took a narrow lead in the polls leading up the primary. Smith won the primary with nearly 40 percent of the vote; Rohrer finished a distant second with 22 percent of the vote.

He faced incumbent Democrat U.S. Senator Bob Casey Jr. in the general election in November. Casey was first elected in 2006, defeating then-incumbent U.S. Senator Rick Santorum by 18 points, 59%–41%.

Following controversial comments about rape by Republican Representative Todd Akin, Smith was asked August 27, 2012 by the Pennsylvania Press Club, with regard to his no-exceptions anti-abortion stance, how he would tell a daughter or granddaughter who had been raped that she had to keep the pregnancy. Smith stated that he had been in a similar situation because his relative had become pregnant out of wedlock. Smith later stated that he was not equating the two situations, but that "a father's position" was similar.

Smith lost in the general election to Casey, 54 to 45 percent.

=== Political positions ===
On September 7, 2012, Smith released the full text of his five-point economic plan entitled, Restoring the American Dream. The major points of his plan focused upon reducing federal spending and easing domestic energy production. Smith has continued to run television ads promoting his policy plan.

Smith believed that life begins at conception, stating, "My stance is on record and its very simplistic: I'm pro-life, period", and he believed abortion should be banned with no exceptions, including in circumstances of rape and incest.

== Personal life ==
After graduation, he married his high school sweetheart. They lived in Armstrong County for several years with seven children. His net worth was estimated at between $60 and $70 million. Smith died at his home in Shelocta in 2015.

Party political offices
Preceded by Rick Santorum	Republican nominee for U.S. Senator from Pennsylvania (Class 1); 2012	Succeeded by Lou Barletta
