= Sam Rohrer =

American politician (born 1955)

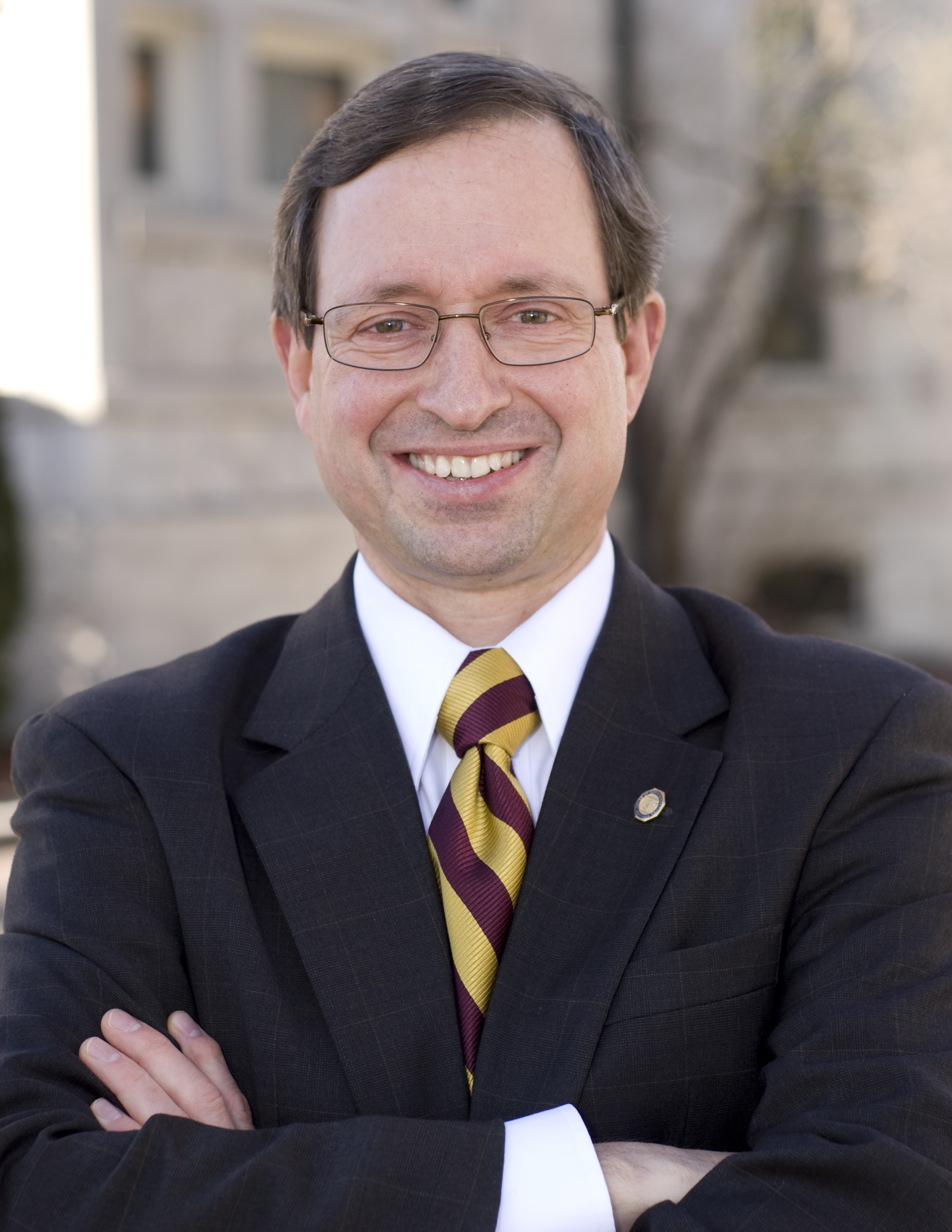

Member of the Pennsylvania House of Representatives from the 128th district
- In office January 5, 1993 – November 30, 2010
- Preceded by: James Gallen
- Succeeded by: Mark Gillen

Personal details
- Born: Samuel E. Rohrer; August 11, 1955 (age 71) Dover, Ohio, U.S.
- Party: Republican
- Spouse: Ruth Ann Rohrer
- Education: Bob Jones University

Samuel E. Rohrer (born August 11, 1955) is an American businessman and politician. A member of the Republican Party, he served as a member of the Pennsylvania House of Representatives from the 128th District.

Before entering politics, Rohrer managed a radio station and worked in marketing for Graco. In 2010, he ran for Governor of Pennsylvania, losing in the primary election to Tom Corbett. Rohrer ran for the United States Senate in 2012 to challenge incumbent Democratic incumbent Bob Casey, Jr., but was defeated in the primary by Tom Smith. He is currently president of the Pennsylvania Pastors' Network, a branch of Let Freedom Ring, Inc.

== Early life, education, and radio career ==
Rohrer was born in Dover, Ohio, and is an alumnus of Tuscarawas Valley High School. After earning a degree in Business Administration from Bob Jones University in 1977, he managed a radio station for several years before becoming director of marketing for Graco, based in Elverson, Pennsylvania.

== Pennsylvania House of Representatives ==
=== Elections ===
Rohrer was elected to the State House in November 1992, succeeding retiring Republican Jim Gallen. He typically won re-election with over 60% of the vote. However, he faced difficult contests in his last two elections. In 2006, he defeated Democrat Russell Hummel 55–45%. In 2008, he defeated Democrat John Woodward 52–48%.

=== Tenure ===
He introduced legislation that would eliminate school property taxes in Pennsylvania. He was a strong opponent of the REAL ID Act. He authored the historic Education Improvement Tax Credit (EITC) scholarship. Today over 150,000 students have earned the scholarship to go to private schools.

=== Committee assignments ===
- House Finance Committee (Chairman)
- House Agriculture and Rural Affairs Committee (Chairman)
- House Game and Fisheries Committee
- House Appropriations Committee

== 2010 gubernatorial campaign ==
In November 2009, Rohrer announced that he would not seek re-election to the State House, and would instead seek the Republican nomination for governor. His campaign team, which was headed by Jeff Coleman, a former colleague of Rohrer's in the State House, received praise for its innovative and effective use of technology, including social media. Rohrer's primary opponent, State Attorney General Tom Corbett, was endorsed by the Republican State Committee of Pennsylvania on February 13, 2010, but that endorsement also generated support for Rohrer from members of the Tea Party movement. Rohrer and his supporters organized a day-long rally entitled "Mobilize for Liberty", which included seminars and a speech from Rohrer, that took place down the hall from the main ballroom in which the State Committee was announcing its endorsement of Corbett. Following its endorsement of Corbett, the State Committee sent out mailers attacking Rohrer's vote in favor of the 2005 legislative pay raise, as well as his 2001 vote in favor of a plan to increase lawmaker pensions by upwards of 50 percent.

Ultimately, Corbett defeated Rohrer 69–31%. Rohrer only won two counties in the state: Lancaster County (52%) and Berks County (80%). He nearly won Clinton and Lycoming Counties During the following summer, supporters initiated a write-in campaign for the November election. Rohrer did not endorse nor denounce the ultimately unsuccessful campaign.

== Between campaigns ==
In February 2011 Rohrer became Pennsylvania state director for Americans for Prosperity. Rohrer resigned from the position in November, in preparation for a run for the United States Senate.

== 2012 U.S. Senate election ==
On Friday, November 4, 2011, Jeff Coleman, who again signed-on to advise Rohrer's campaign, told the Associated Press that Rohrer was considering a run for the United States Senate seat currently held by Democrat Bob Casey Jr., and would likely officially announce his candidacy later in the month. Rohrer officially announced his candidacy at rally near Harrisburg, Pennsylvania on November 21. He also released a web video announcing his entrance to the race.

A poll taken shortly after his entrance into the race found Rohrer ahead of the rest of the primary field, besting his closest competitor by ten percentage points. In a Pittsburgh Tribune Review/WPXI-TV poll taken February 2–6, 2012, Rohrer continued to lead his opponents, albeit by a slighter margin; businessman Tom Smith had the support of 8% of those polled to Rohrer's 10%. A later poll conducted by Franklin & Marshall College on March 20–25 placed Rohrer slightly behind Smith, with 7% and 9% support, respectively, with 81% of those surveyed remaining undecided.

Rohrer was endorsed by former 2012 Presidential candidates Michele Bachmann and Herman Cain.

Rohrer was defeated in the primary by fellow Republican Tom Smith on April 24, 2012.

== Personal life ==
Rohrer and his wife, Ruth Ann, have six children and five grandchildren. He currently serves as president of the Pennsylvania Pastors' Network, a branch of Let Freedom Ring, Inc. that informs clergy on issues pertaining to public policy. On March 21, 2013 he was awarded "Alumnus of the Year" at the annual Bob Jones University Bible Conference.
