= Rieser =

Rieser is a surname of German origin. It may refer to the following people:

- Dolf Rieser (1898–1983) - British painter and printmaker
- Leonard M. Rieser (1922–1998) - American physicist
- Michael Rieser (1828–1905) - Austrian painter
- Samuel Maximilian Rieser (1893–1981) - Jewish lawyer and philosopher
- Verena Rieser (born 1979), German computer scientist

== Other ==
- Rieser Mill was listed on the National Register of Historic Places in 1990.
- Rieser-Shoemaker Farm was listed on the National Register of Historic Places in 1992.

== See also ==
- Reiser (disambiguation)
- Ries (disambiguation)
- Riser (disambiguation)
