= Cacoosing Creek =

Stream in Pennsylvania, United States

Coordinates: 40°21′58″N 75°59′41″W

Cacoosing Creek is a 11.4-mile-long (18.3 km) tributary of the Tulpehocken Creek in Berks County, Pennsylvania in the United States.

It starts in Fritztown and flows northeast, separating Spring Township and Sinking Spring on its southeast side from South Heidelberg and Lower Heidelberg Townships on its northeast side. Just above its mouth, removal of the Paper Mill Dam is underway.

Cacoosing is a name derived from a Native American language purported to mean "place of owls". (Compare Kokosing River.)

Cacoosing Creek joins the Tulpehocken just west of Spring Ridge.

== See also ==
- List of rivers of Pennsylvania
