= Fritztown, Pennsylvania =

Unincorporated community in Pennsylvania, US

- Unincorporated community
- Location within Pennsylvania Location within the United States
- Coordinates: 40°17′43″N 76°04′07″W
- Country: United States
- State: Pennsylvania
- County: Berks
- Township: South Heidelberg
- Time zone: UTC-5 (Eastern (EST))
  - Summer (DST): UTC-4 (EDT)
- ZIP code: 19608
- Area codes: 610 & 484
- GNIS feature ID: 1175281

Fritztown is an unincorporated community in South Heidelberg and Spring Township, Berks County, Pennsylvania, United States. It is located along Fritztown Road to the west of U.S. Route 222 and approximately two miles northeast of the Berks and Lancaster County line and 3.4 miles southwest of Sinking Spring. The Cacoosing Creek begins here and drains northeastward into the Tulpehocken Creek, a tributary of the Schuylkill River. The area is experiencing population growth, due to new sub-divisions being built around the community. It is served by the Sinking Spring branch of the Reading post office, with the zip code of 19608.

On January 1, 1907, William G. Leininger of The Railroad Sock a hosiery mill in Fritztown on 5 Old Wernersville Road, which produced 200 dozen pair of hosiery daily. By this time, Leininger operated the factory in Mohnton and others in Berks County, according to local historian Paul Miller of the Sinking Spring Area Historical Society.
