= Smørøyet =

Norwegian television series

Smørøyet was a Norwegian children and young people's TV series which ran on NRK1 from winter 1998 to spring 2000. The programme consisted of series, live artists, linked themes and presenters. The series followed on the children and young people's series Midt i smørøyet which finished in spring 1998. Smørøyet was followed by the series Reser in autumn 2000.

The series premiered on NRK on 22 September 1998. The last episode was shown on 1 April 2000. The series won an award for best magazine programme at the Gullruten 1999.

== Presenters ==
- Petter Schjerven (Presenter) (1998–99)
- Ole Martin Lauritsen (Presenter) (1998–99)
- Janne Rønningen (Reporter/presenter) (1998–00)
- Anja Stabell (Reporter) (1998–00)
- Stian Barsnes-Simonsen (1999–00)
- Anders Varmann Hustad (1999–00)

=== Producers ===
- Hans-Olav Thyvold (1998–99)
- Barbro Semmingsen (1999–00)

=== Directors ===
- Mette Kristensen
- Hilde Hægh

== Series shown on the programme ==
- Egil & Barbara (1998–99)
- Operasjon Popcorn (1998)
- Latex (1998–99) (with Erlend Loe)
- Sølvsjalet (1998)
- Asylet (1999)
- Janne flytter hjemmefra (1999)
- I søsterens verden (1999–00) (director: Stine Buer)
- Ansur (1999) was shown in winter 1999 under the title "Smørøyet presenterer ANSUR" (no other series had this type of title) (7 episodes)
