= Montello, Pennsylvania =

Unincorporated community in Pennsylvania, U.S.

Coordinates: 40°25′09″N 76°17′43″W

Montello is an unincorporated community in Spring Township, Berks County, Pennsylvania, United States. It is located one mile south of Sinking Spring, and is less than half a mile from the South Heidelberg Township line. The village is served by the Wilson School District. Its Zip Code is 19608.
