= The Railroad Sock =

American sock manufacturer

- Product type: Socks
- Current owner: Family-owned
- Country: United States
- Introduced: At least 1901; 125 years ago
- Markets: United States
- Tagline: An American Tradition Since 1901
- Website: https://www.therailroadsock.com/

The Railroad Sock, Inc. is an American sock manufacturer, established in 1901. Its logo depicts an illustration of a locomotive. As of 2022, the socks continue to be manufactured in the United States.

Until the late 1990s, the company manufactured two men's sock styles. As of 2022, it offers multiple socks in male and female styles including diabetic socks.

== History ==
Founder William G. Leininger (1863–1936) was born in Cumru Township, Pennsylvania on December 27, 1863, to Lydia A. Grill Leininger and James Leininger. In his youth, he worked on his family farm while attending district schools. At 18, circa 1881, he left home to learn the trade of "hat finishing" under John Hendel & Son of Reading, Pennsylvania. Circa 1895, he worked in broom manufacturing for 18 months, but this "proved unsatisfactory" for Leininger.

In March 1896, Leininger collaborated with his cousin George H. Leininger (1862–1935), president of the Mohnton National Bank, to establish a hosiery mill in Mohnton, Pennsylvania titled Industrial Hosiery Mills of Mohnton. The mill joined the National Association of Hosiery Manufacturers in 1907.

On November 1, 1898, the cousins dissolved the business into two independent mills, both located in Mohnton. George H. Leininger retained the Industrial Hosiery Mills of Mohnton name; George's plant would continue to dye and finish textiles until at least 1925. Circa 1909, George's Industrial Hosiery Mills of Mohnton company shipped products "throughout the United States, Canada, and to Honolulu." George would go on to found multiple textile mills in Pennsylvania, employing about 60 hands at each.

In 1898, William G. Leininger began production of the men's half hose and partnered with New York agents. These were likely Robert P. Steele & Co and, later, the Dwight S. Williams Company, Inc.

The Dwight S. Williams company claims that "The Railroad Sock" logo and brand was advertised in 1901.

On January 1, 1907, William G. Leininger opened another Leininger Hosiery Mill on 5 Old Wernersville Road in Fritztown, Pennsylvania, which produced 200 dozen pair of hosiery daily. By this time, he operated the factory in Mohnton and others in Berks County, according to local historian Paul Miller of the Sinking Spring Area Historical Society.

The 1910 "The Blue Book" Textile Directory claims Leininger was represented by Robert P. Steele & Co. and had 65 employees. On July 10, 1913, Robert P. Steele and Co. applied for copyright on the label showing "The Railroad Sock" accompanying an image of a train. The U.S. Patent Office granted them the Certificate of Copyright No. 3424 on November 18, 1913.

Agents Robert P. Steele & Co. was the predecessor to Dwight S. Williams Co., Inc. After its acquisition, the Williams Co. applied for a series of trademarks regarding male socks and a train theme, including:

- November 10, 1948 – registering "The Railroad Sock" along with a modern locomotive illustration (United States Patent Office Registration No. 524,743, granted May 2, 1950)
- January 12, 1954 – registering "the pictorial illustration of an older type locomotive and train" on conjunction with a men's sock (US Patent Office Registration No. 584,507, granted January 4, 1955)
- January 4, 1955 – granted slogan "Sock Line of the Nation" (Registration No. 600,543)
- February 15, 1955 – men's sock titled "The Railroad Sock" (Registration No. 602,189)

=== Lawsuit ===
During "the latter part of 1953," Lykens Hosiery Mills Inc. of Lykens, Pennsylvania began selling a men's work sock titled the "Trainman" with an illustration of a train and similar colors and packaging to the Railroad Sock. In April 1956, the Dwight S. Williams company sued Hosiery Mills, Inc. for their sock titled "Trainman Socks," which was considered by the plaintiff to be copyright infringement and "unfair competition."

Hillsboro Hosiery Mills, Inc. in Hillsborough, New Hampshire changed their name and headquarters to The Railroad Sock, Inc. in Mohnton, PA on October 13, 1964.

=== Ownership ===
Three generations of Leiningers operated the company. In the 1970s, Fritz and Dorris Killian bought the company. Fritz Killian died in 1986, after which the business was sold to Dennis and Jan Downing. Around this time, the business "owned 40 knitting machines and made only two men's sock styles."

In 2022, Amanda Kunkel Beech and her brother Charles Kunkel purchased the company; their website states their intention to "[keep] the emphasis on family-run, high quality, durability and American manufacturing."

== See also ==
- The Pennsylvania Railroad, established in 1846, which inspired the name
