= Grieser =

Grieser is a German surname. Notable people with the surname include:

- Angelika Grieser (born 1959), German swimmer
- Manfred Grieser (born 1938), German discus thrower

== See also ==
- Rieser
