= Frank Gruber (disambiguation) =

Frank Gruber (1904–1969) was an American writer and screenwriter.

Frank Gruber may also refer to:

- Franklin H. Gruber, American wagonmaker who built the Gruber Wagon Works in Pennsylvania
- L. Franklin Gruber (1870–1941), American Lutheran who compiled the Gruber Collection of religious source material
