= Spring Township, Berks County, Pennsylvania =

Township in Pennsylvania, US

Spring Township
- Township
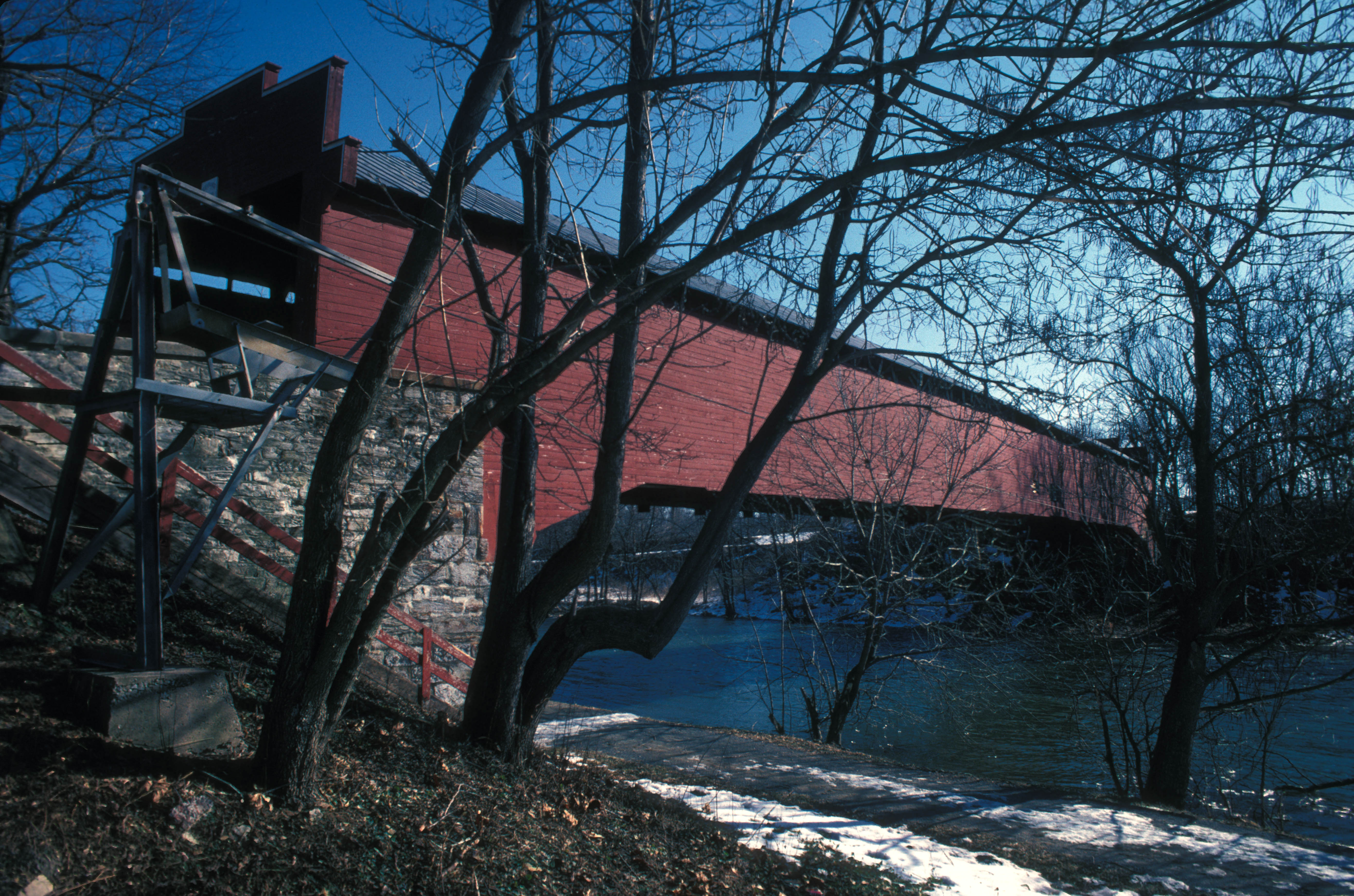
- Wertz's Covered Bridge in Spring Township

- Location of Spring Township in Pennsylvania Spring Township (the United States)
- Coordinates: 40°21′00″N 75°59′29″W
- Country: United States
- State: Pennsylvania
- County: Berks

Area
  - Total: 18.49 sq mi (47.89 km^{2})
  - Land: 18.38 sq mi (47.61 km^{2})
  - Water: 0.10 sq mi (0.27 km^{2})
- Elevation: 364 ft (111 m)

Population (2020)
  - Total: 28,396
  - Estimate (2023): 28,501
  - Density: 1,489.8/sq mi (575.21/km^{2})
- Time zone: UTC-5 (EST)
  - Summer (DST): UTC-4 (EDT)
- Area codes: 610, 484
- FIPS code: 42-011-72824

Spring Township is a township in Berks County, Pennsylvania, United States. The population was 28,396 at the 2020 census, making it the second most populous municipality in Berks County after Reading.

== History ==
In 1850, the Township of Cumru included about 33,000 acres of land, with a population of 3,853, making it the most populous district in the county outside of Reading. In area, this was the largest township. In the decade before, two unsuccessful attempts were made to divide Cumru on account of its great extent. In 1850, a third attempt was made. The petition called for a division line situated to the west of the line requested in previous petitions, beginning at the “Harrisburg Bridge” and extending southward to the Lancaster County lines, at the corner of Brecknock Township, and it was inscribed by only 45 taxable inhabitants of the township. The court appointed Aaron Albright, Richard Boone and Michael K. Boyer as commissioners to inquire into advisability of the proposed division. The commissioners, after viewing Cumru Township, divided it and recommended the western part to be designated as a new township under the name of “Spring”. The name was derived from a large fresh water spring in the central portion of the area. Because of the limestone fissures under the ground, the spring periodically appeared and disappeared. The early settlers, who used it for their daily water supplies, referred to it as the “Sinking Spring”. The boundary lines of the township were described as enclosing some 15,000 acres. The report was presented for these boundaries on August 5, 1850. The Court confirmed the report on November 23, 1850, and formed the new township calling it the Township of Spring.

Wertz's Covered Bridge was added to the National Register of Historic Places in 1978.

== Geography ==
According to the U.S. Census Bureau, the township has a total area of 18.3 square miles (47.3 km^{2}), of which 18.2 square miles (47.2 km^{2}) is land and 0.04 square mile (0.1 km^{2}) (0.22%) is water. Since it extends from near the Schuylkill River in the northeast to the Lancaster County border in the southwest, the township's terrain varies considerably. Most is drained to the Schuylkill, except for the southwestern end, which is in the Susquehanna watershed and drains via the Conestoga River. While much of the north is low-lying, much of the southwest is mountainous. The Cacoosing Creek forms the natural northwestern boundary and flows into the Tulpehocken Creek, which in turn forms the natural northeastern boundary.

== Adjacent townships ==
- South Heidelberg Township (west)
- Lower Heidelberg Township (northwest)
- Bern Township (north)
- Cumru Township (east)
- Brecknock Township, Berks County (southeast)
- Brecknock Township, Lancaster County (south)
- East Cocalico Township, Lancaster County (southwest)

Adjacent boroughs

- Sinking Spring (west)
- Wyomissing (east)
- Adamstown (south)

Unincorporated communities in Spring Township include Colony Park, Fritztown (also in South Heidelberg Township,) Gouglersville (also in Cumru and Brecknock Townships), Lincoln Park, Mohns Hill, Montello, Montrose Manor, Spring Ridge, Springmont, Van Reed Mills (also in Lower Heidelberg Township,) Vinemont (also in South Heidelberg Township,) West Wyomissing, Whitfield, Wilshire, Drexelwood, Whitfield, Whitfield Five, West Lawn, West Wyomissing, Whiskey Ditch, Montrose Manor, Springmont, Cornwall Terrace, The Oaks, Shiloh Hills, Gring's Hill Estates, and Reedy Run.

== Climate ==
The township has a hot-summer humid continental climate (Dfa) and the hardiness zone is 6b, except for small areas to the south, where it is 7a. Average monthly temperatures in Spring Ridge range from 29.6 °F in January to 74.7 °F in July, while in Vinemont they range from 29.7 °F in January to 73.8 °F in July.

== Transportation ==
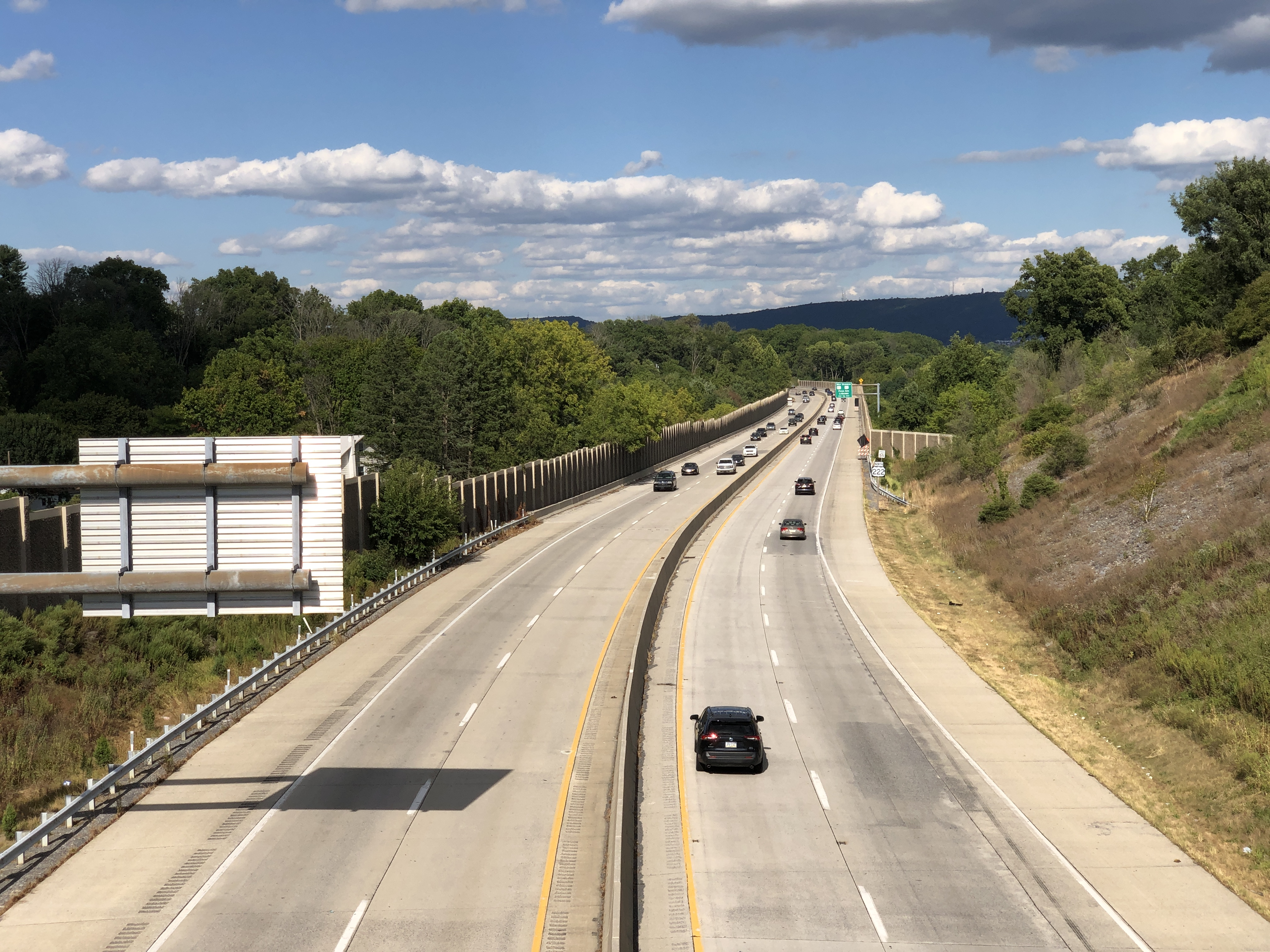
US 222 northbound in Spring Township

As of 2017, there were 130.60 miles (210.18 km) of public roads in Spring Township, of which 18.44 miles (29.68 km) were maintained by the Pennsylvania Department of Transportation (PennDOT) and 112.16 miles (180.50 km) were maintained by the township.

The township's numbered roads are U.S. Route 222, U.S. Route 422, and Pennsylvania Route 724. US 222 and PA 724 meet in Spring Township and both meet US 422 in Wyomissing and Sinking Spring, respectively. US 222 and US 422 continue northeast as the Warren Street Bypass across Wyomissing until Pennsylvania Route 12, US 222, and US 422 diverge. US 222 continues northwest across the township as the Outer Bypass and turns northeast over the Tulpehocken Creek for Maidencreek Township and Allentown. US 222 south provides expressway access to Interstate 76 (Pennsylvania Turnpike) and Lancaster. Other important local roads include Chapel Hill Road, Fritztown Road, Grings Hill Road, Paper Mill Road, State Hill Road, Van Reed Road, and Vinemont Road.

Spring Township is served by multiple Berks Area Regional Transportation Authority (BARTA) bus routes including 12, 14, 15, and 16, which serve residential and business areas in the township and connect the township to the BARTA Transportation Center in Reading and other points in Berks County.

== Demographics ==
As of the 2000 census, there were 21,805 people, 8,739 households, and 6,248 families residing in the township. The population density was 1,196.9 inhabitants per square mile (462.1/km^{2}). There were 8,995 housing units at an average density of 493.7 per square mile (190.6/km^{2}). The racial makeup of the township was 93.55% White, 2.10% African American, 0.06% Native American, 2.16% Asian, 0.01% Pacific Islander, 1.02% from other races, and 1.10% from two or more races. Hispanic or Latino of any race were 2.89% of the population.

There were 8,739 households, out of which 31.3% had children under the age of 18 living with them, 61.2% were married couples living together, 7.4% had a female householder with no husband present, and 28.5% were non-families. 23.5% of all households were made up of individuals, and 10.2% had someone living alone who was 65 years of age or older. The average household size was 2.47 and the average family size was 2.93.

Historical population
Census	Pop.	Note	%±
1980	17,193		—
1990	18,899		9.9%
2000	21,805		15.4%
2010	27,119		24.4%
2016 (est.)	27,388		1.0%
Source:US Census Bureau

In the township, the population was spread out, with 23.4% under the age of 18, 6.0% from 18 to 24, 28.3% from 25 to 44, 25.2% from 45 to 64, and 17.1% who were 65 years of age or older. The median age was 40 years. For every 100 females there were 92.1 males. For every 100 females age 18 and over, there were 88.6 males.

The median income for a household in the township was $56,025, and the median income for a family was $63,724. Males had a median income of $45,910 versus $29,476 for females. The per capita income for the township was $26,493. About 0.9% of families and 1.8% of the population were below the poverty line, including 2.6% of those under age 18 and 2.4% of those age 65 or over.

== Commercial activity ==
Spring Township hosts a number of commercial parks. The township shares the primary retail district of Reading's western suburbs with Wyomissing and includes multiple power centers and a number of restaurants in this area extending north and west from the Berkshire Mall as far north as the Spring Ridge Drive exit off US Route 222.

== Education ==
Public education in Spring Township is provided by the Wilson School District, which has five elementary schools, two middle schools, and Wilson High School. The township hosts Penn State Berks, which offers four-year and associate degrees as well as certificate programs. This is located in the northeastern corner, off the Broadcasting Road exit of the Outer Bypass.

== Board of supervisors ==
- Jesse D. Royer, Chairperson
- George W. Stuck III, Vice-Chairperson
- Lauren Robertson
- Michael S. Wertz
- Zach Zeoli
