= Wertz's Covered Bridge =

- U.S. National Register of Historic Places
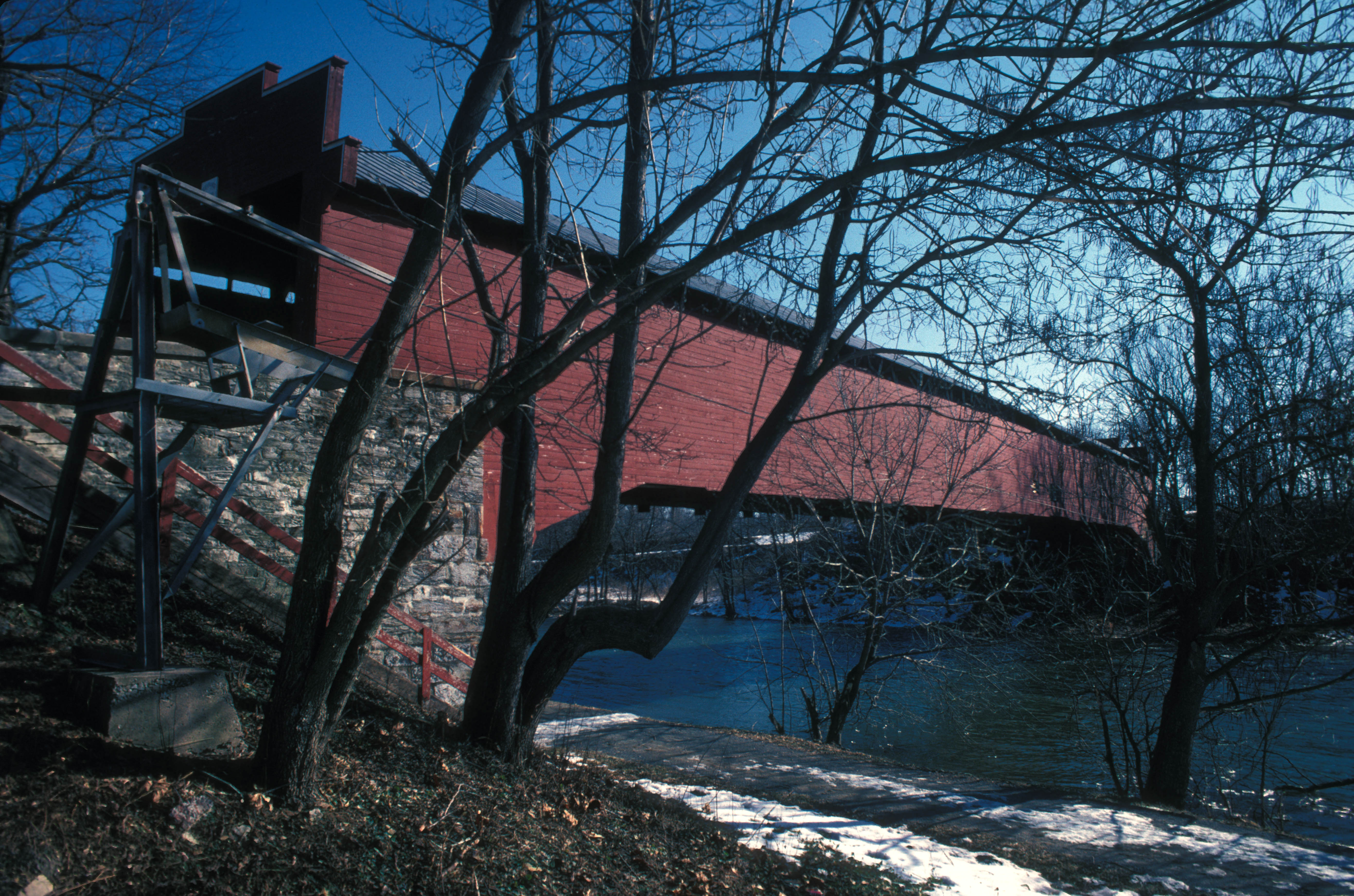

- Location within Pennsylvania Location within the United States
- Location: Northwest of Reading on Township 921, Bern Township and Spring Township, Pennsylvania
- Coordinates: 40°22′7″N 75°58′44″W
- Area: less than one acre
- Built: 1867
- Built by: Amandas Kneer
- Architectural style: Burr arch truss
- MPS: Berks County Covered Bridges TR (AD)
- NRHP reference No.: 78002347
- Added to NRHP: November 17, 1978

Wertz's Covered Bridge, also known as the Red Covered Bridge, is a historic wooden covered bridge located at Bern Township and Spring Township in Berks County, Pennsylvania.

The bridge is a 204-foot-long (62 m), Burr Truss bridge, constructed in 1867. It crosses the Tulpehocken Creek. It serves as the walkway entrance to the Berks County Heritage Center, which also includes the Gruber Wagon Works. It is one of five covered bridges remaining in Berks County. It is the largest single-span covered bridge in Pennsylvania.

The bridge was rehabilitated in 1959 from 10 April to 3 August, however, when the Warren Street Bypass opened the bridge was closed permanently on 23 October 1959. It was listed on the National Register of Historic Places on 17 November 1978. From June until December 1984 the bridge was restored. The siding was replaced, several floor boards were replaced, it was jacked up, realigned, tightened, camber restored, and the rotted arch ends were replaced along with cedar roof shingles.
