= Gruber Wagon Works =

- U.S. National Register of Historic Places
- U.S. National Historic Landmark
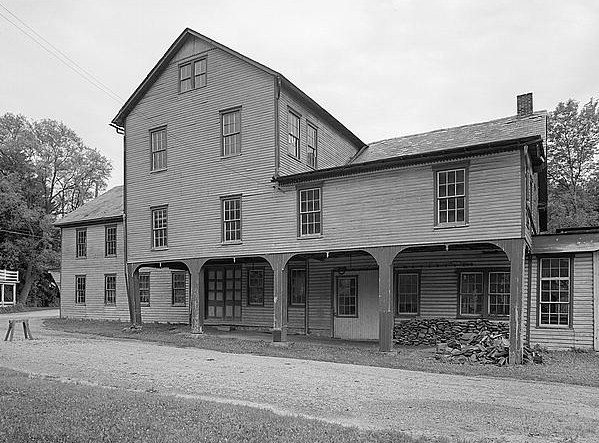
- Gruber Wagon Works in 1973

- Location within Pennsylvania Location within the United States
- Location: Bern Township, Pennsylvania
- Coordinates: 40°22′14.16″N 75°58′46.56″W
- Area: 12 acres (4.9 ha)
- Built: 1882
- Architect: Franklin H. Gruber
- NRHP reference No.: 72001092

Significant dates
- Added to NRHP: June 2, 1972
- Designated NHL: December 22, 1977

The Gruber Wagon Works is a historic industrial facility on Red Bridge Road in Bern Township, Pennsylvania, United States. Built about 1882, it is an extremely rare example of a fully outfitted 19th-century wagon manufacturing facility. Originally located in nearby Pleasant Valley, it was moved in 1976 to its present location in Tulpehocken Creek Park to make way for a flood control project. It was designated a National Historic Landmark in 1977. It now serves as part of a county open-air museum.

== Description and history ==
The Gruber Wagon Works is located northwest of Reading, Pennsylvania, overlooking Tulpehocken Creek at the end of Red Bridge Road. It is a 2-1/2 story wood frame structure in a cruciform plan, with gabled roofs and a rubblestone foundation. The interior is divided into a number of functional areas: a wood shop, a blacksmithy, a bench shop, and a paint shop. Surviving devices and equipment include specialized equipment for the manufacture of axle hubs and spoked wheels, a variety of saws, sanders, and other woodworking equipment. Most of these are belt-driven by a gasoline-powered motor. Movement of materials between the floors is accommodated by a hand-operated elevator installed by the Grubers in 1905-06, as part of a building expansion. Outside the main building are two small outbuildings: one serving as an outhouse, the other for the storage of iron.

Franklin H. Gruber, who had been making farm-use wagons since the 1870s, constructed the wagon works in 1882. The business continued operating under the family's ownership, making standard and customized wagons until the 1950s, after which the business was limited to repairs. It closed in 1971. At that time it included all of its equipment and machinery, making it "nothing less than a three-dimensional document of one particular American industry, fixed within a particular, narrow time frame", according to a curator for the Smithsonian National Museum of History and Technology, that is unrivaled in the United States.

Unfortunately, the building's original site on Licking Creek in Pleasant Valley fell within the planned area of Blue Marsh Lake, so it was bought by the Army Corps of Engineers and during the winter of 1976–1977 they relocated it 5 miles (8 km) east to its present location. The building is now part of the Berks County Heritage Center, an open air complex that also includes the C. Howard Hiester Canal Center with exhibits about canal transportation, Wertz's Covered Bridge, Melcher's Grist Mill, Deppen Cemetery, several memorials and gardens. The Center is open seasonally and offers tours of the historic buildings.

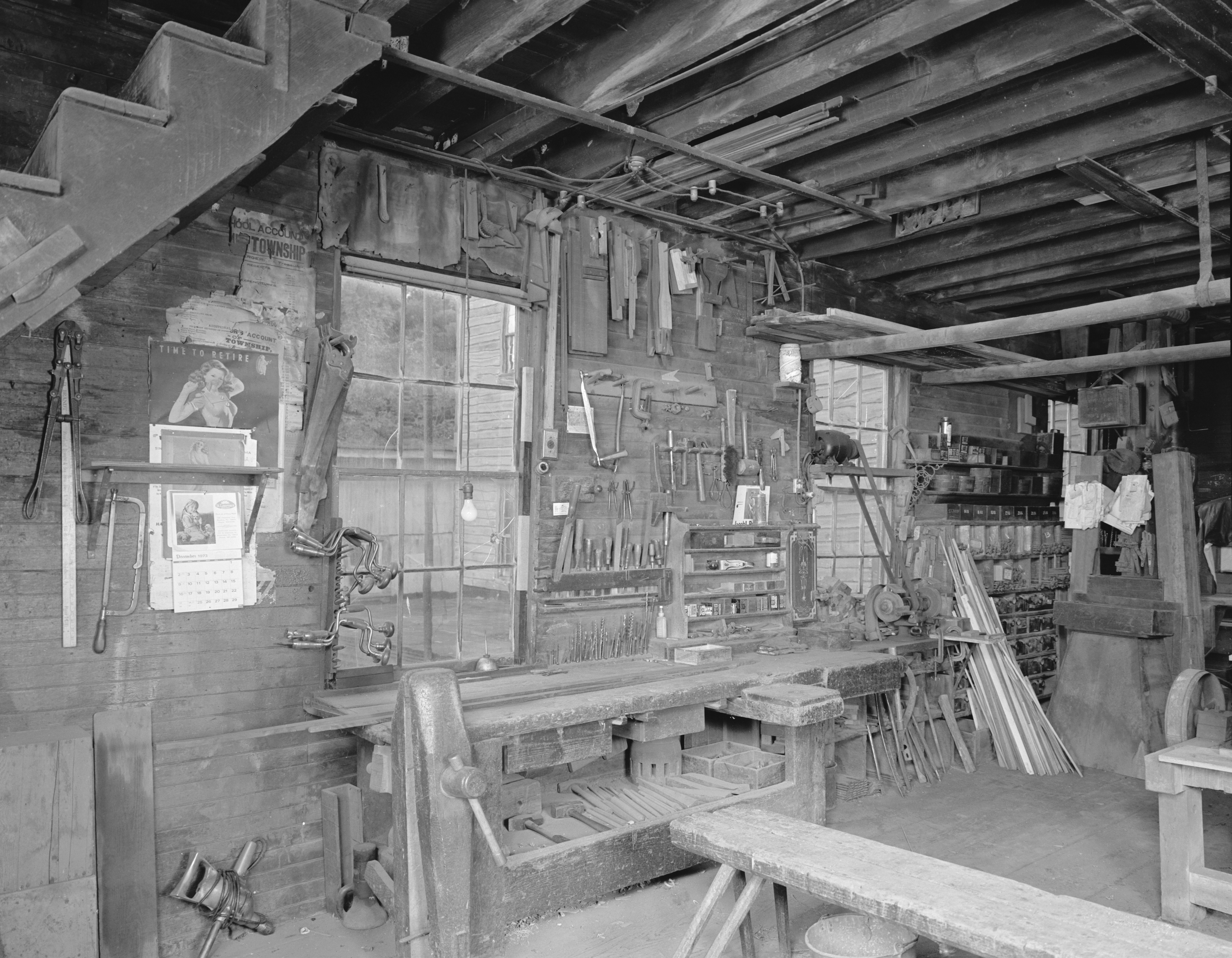
Frank Gruber's bench

== See also ==
- List of National Historic Landmarks in Pennsylvania
- National Register of Historic Places listings in Berks County, Pennsylvania
