= Janne Rønningen =

Norwegian comedian and presenter (born 1969)

Janne Rønningen (born 25 June 1969) is a Norwegian comedian and presenter.

Janne Rønningen mainly grew up in Stavern, Vestfold. Her father was a military officer, and the family also lived three years at Andøya while her father was stationed there. After he received a calling to become a Methodist missionary, the family briefly lived as missionaries in Liberia. She attended Forsøksgymnaset in Oslo. In 1991 Rønningen began to work at a local radio station, Radiorakel in Oslo.

Moving to NRK Radio, she worked on Herreavdelingen and XL, on the youth channel P3. She then moved on to another radio show Holger Nielsens metode and became a presenter of the youth programme Smørøyet on NRK1.

In 2001, Rønningen ran a show for thirteen weeks called Helt privat, together with Kristin Skogheim. In the same year as Big Brother debuted in Norway, Helt privat was built on footage from web cameras in the apartment where Rønningen and Skogheim lived. She was also a touring stand up comic. In March 2004 she was hired by Kanal 24 to present the late night show Rom 24, produced in room 24 at Savoy Hotel. She later produced radio shows with Espen Thoresen. In the summer of 2004 she recorded Robinson VIP, a Nordic celebrity version of Expedition Robinson, to be aired in 2005. She voiced the character Lise in the 2006 film Free Jimmy.
