= Greenfields, Pennsylvania =

Unincorporated community in Pennsylvania, US

- Census-designated place
- Location within Pennsylvania Location within the United States
- Coordinates: 40°21′36″N 75°57′07″W
- Country: United States
- State: Pennsylvania
- County: Berks
- Township: Bern

Area
  - Total: 0.77 sq mi (1.99 km^{2})
  - Land: 0.74 sq mi (1.92 km^{2})
  - Water: 0.027 sq mi (0.07 km^{2})

Population (2020)
  - Total: 1,238
  - Density: 1,672.2/sq mi (645.65/km^{2})
- Time zone: UTC-5 (Eastern (EST))
  - Summer (DST): UTC-4 (EDT)
- ZIP code: 19601
- Area codes: 484, 610 and 835
- FIPS code: 42-31038

Greenfields is a census-designated place in Bern Township, Berks County, Pennsylvania, United States. It is located approximately one mile to the west of the city of Reading at the confluence of the Tulpehocken Creek and Schuylkill River. As of the 2010 census, the population was 1,170 residents.

== Demographics ==
Historical population
Census	Pop.	Note	%±
2020	1,238		—
U.S. Decennial Census
