= Grand View Dairy Farm =

- U.S. National Register of Historic Places
- U.S. Historic district
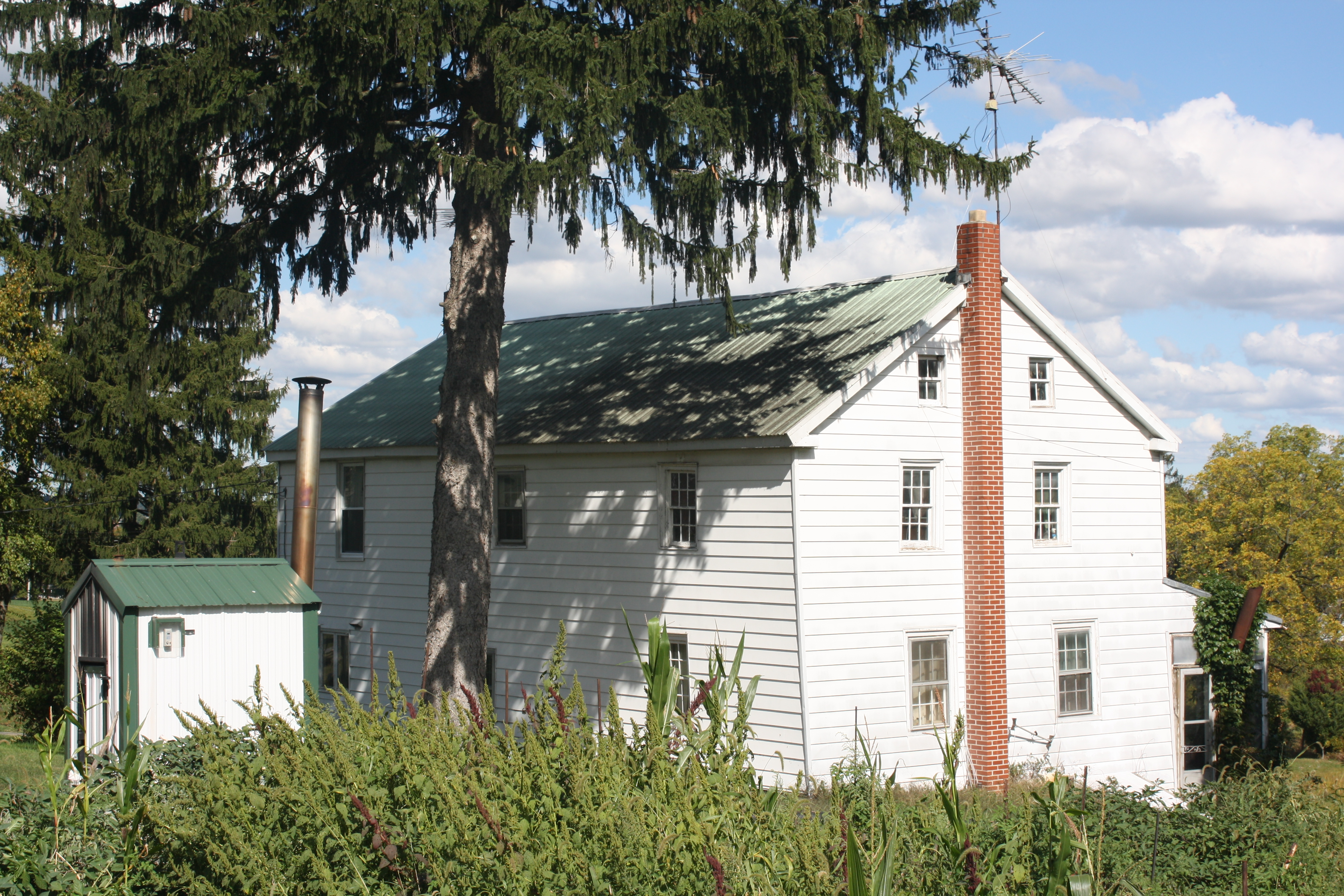
- The farmhouse in September 2013

- Location within Pennsylvania Location within the United States
- Location: Preston Road south of Wernersville, South Heidelberg Township, Pennsylvania
- Coordinates: 40°18′42.2″N 76°04′56″W
- Area: 100 acres (40 ha)
- Built: 1790
- MPS: Farms in Berks County MPS
- NRHP reference No.: 92000933
- Added to NRHP: July 29, 1992

The Grand View Dairy Farm is an historic farm complex and national historic district, which is located in South Heidelberg Township, Berks County, Pennsylvania.

It was listed on the National Register of Historic Places in 1992.

== History and architectural features ==
The Grand View Dairy Farm has eight contributing buildings and four contributing structures: a two-and-one-half-story, log farmhouse that was built on a stone foundation circa 1790, a frame farmhouse that was erected on a stone foundation circa 1890, a frame summer kitchen that was built sometime around 1890, a smokehouse, a butcher shop, a stone dairy barn that was built in 1849, a frame dairy barn that was built in 1901, a bull barn that was erected sometime around 1910, and two frame sheds. The contributing structures are two frame corn cribs, a ground cellar and a frame pig pen, which were built sometime around 1901.

== Gallery ==
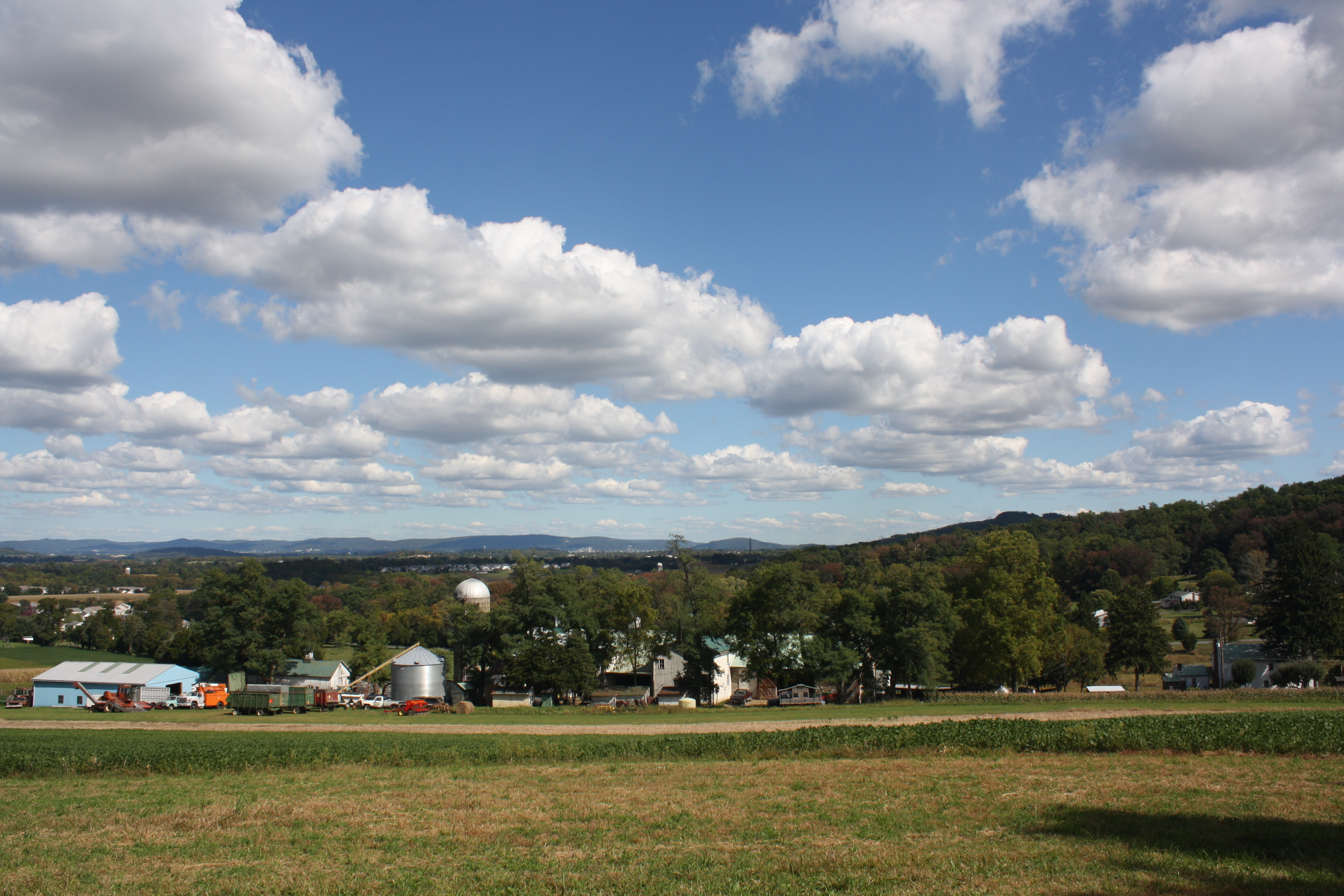
Farm view from west hill

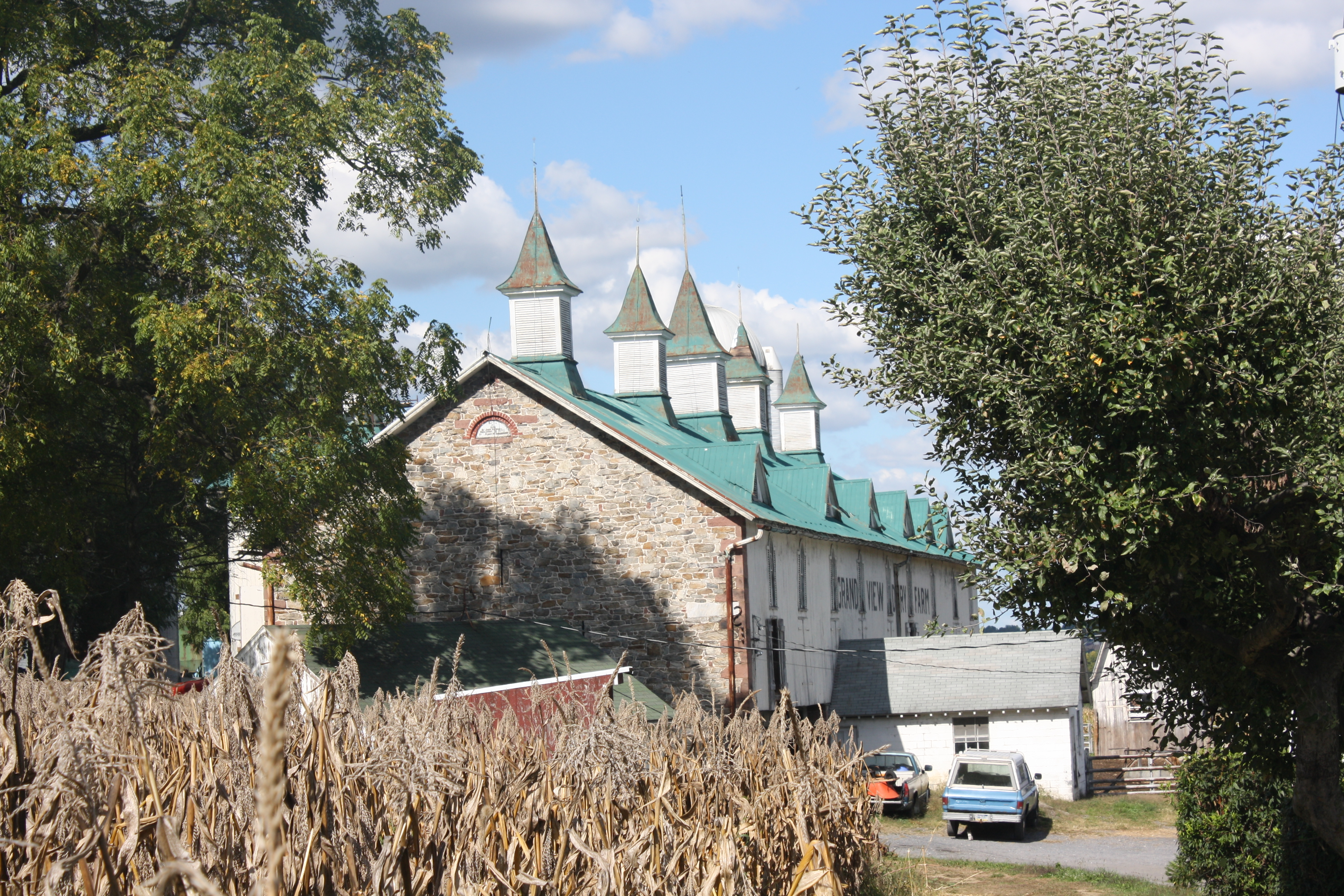
Dairy Barn

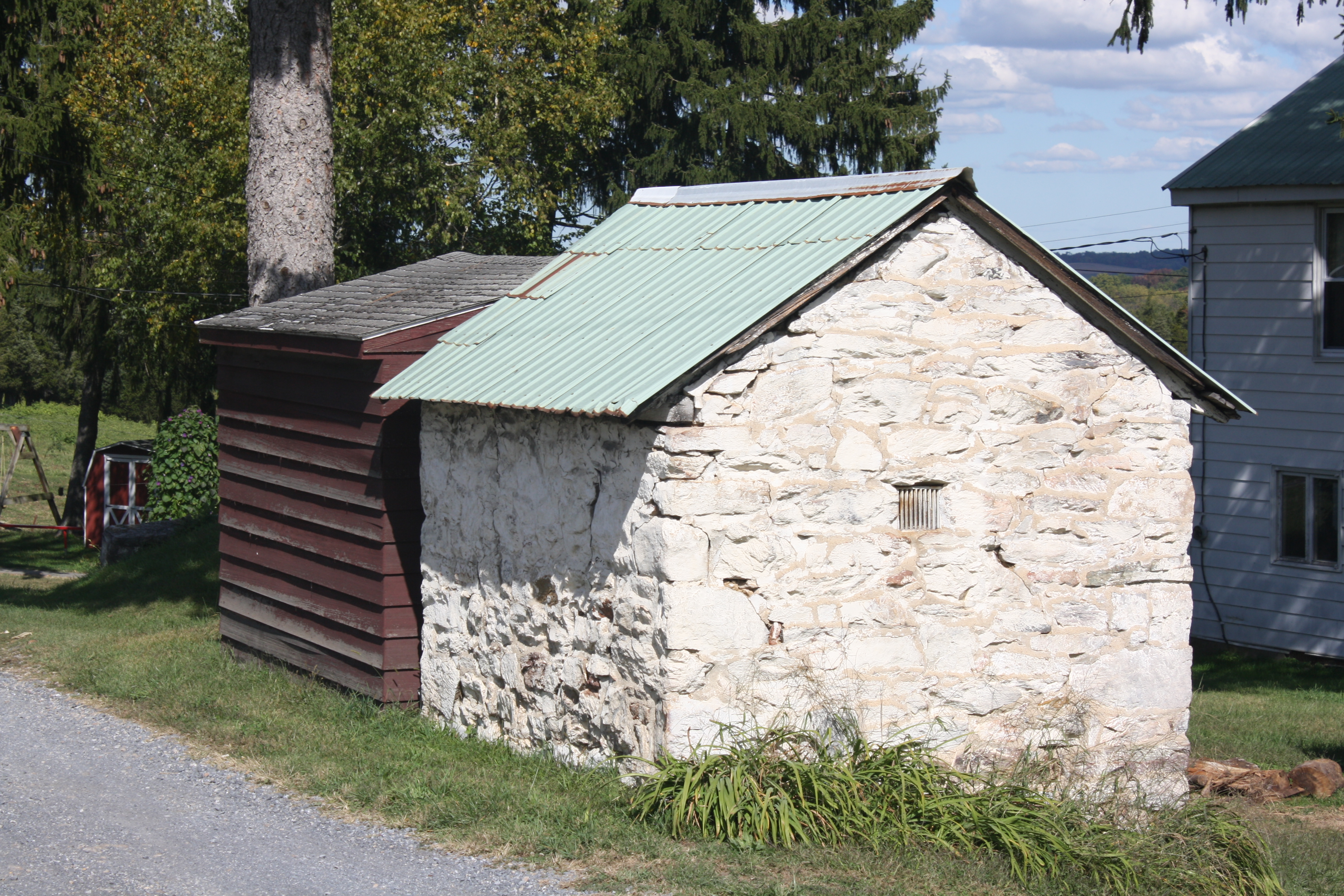
Ground Cellar

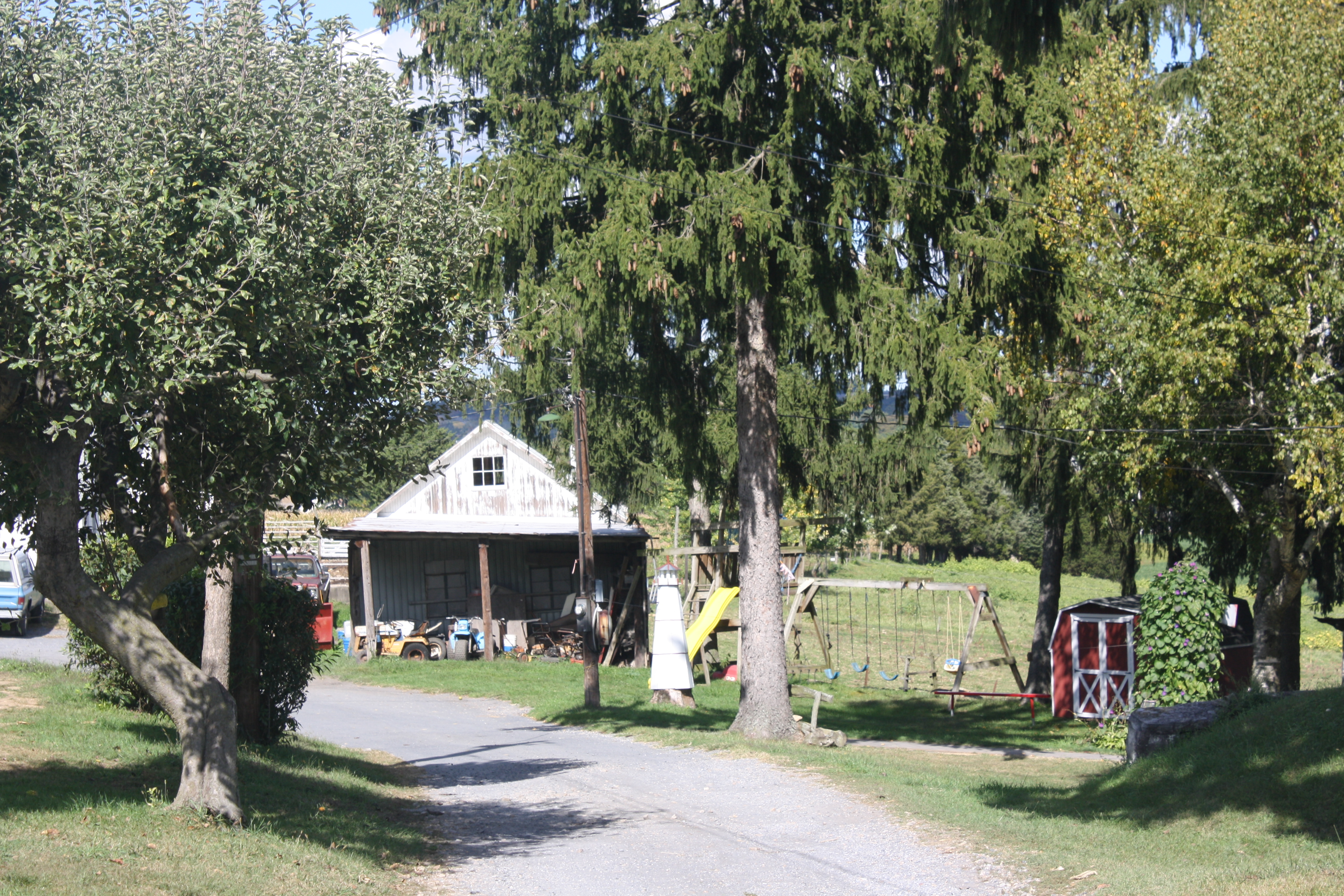
Butcher house

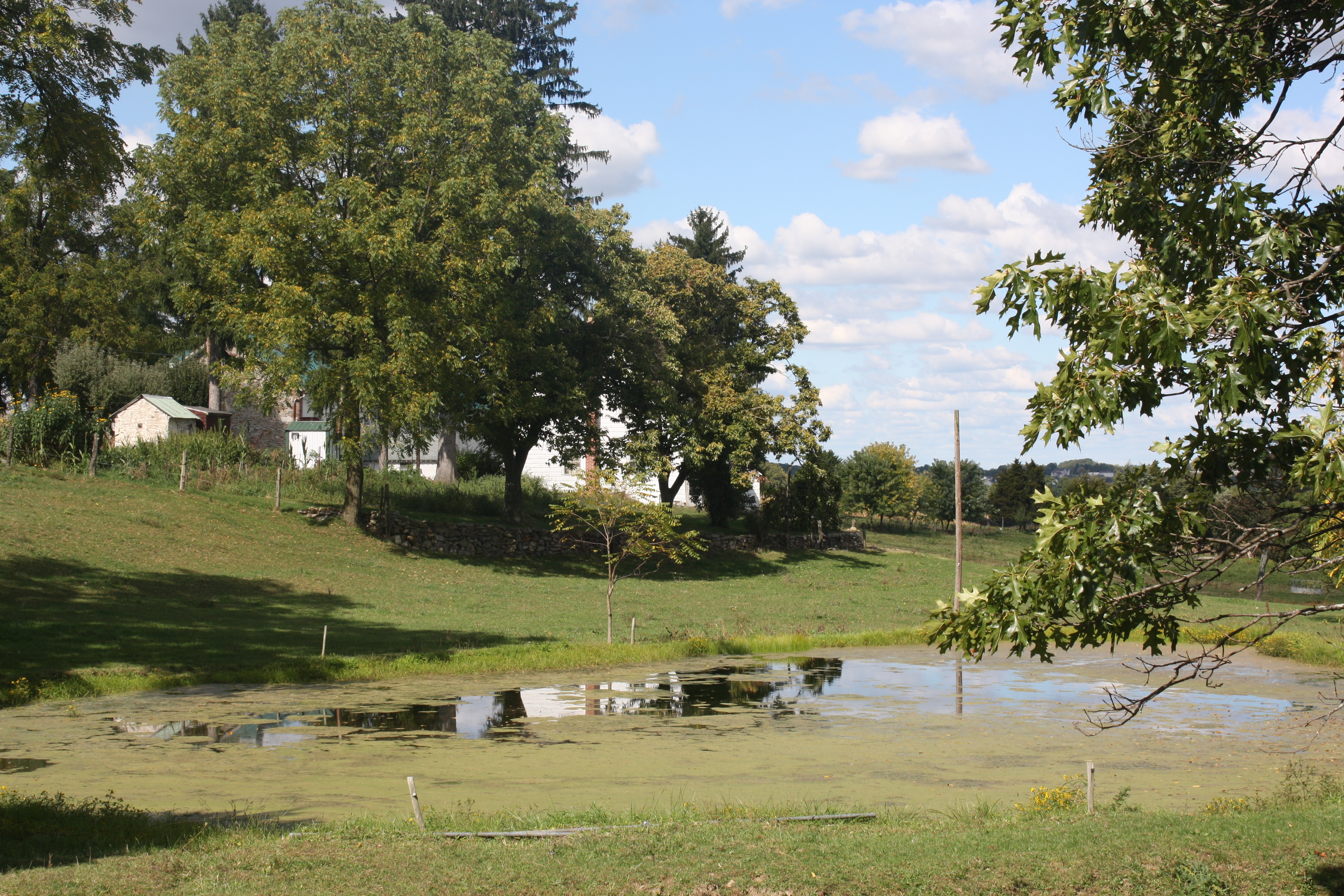
Farm pond
