= Rieser Mill =

- U.S. National Register of Historic Places
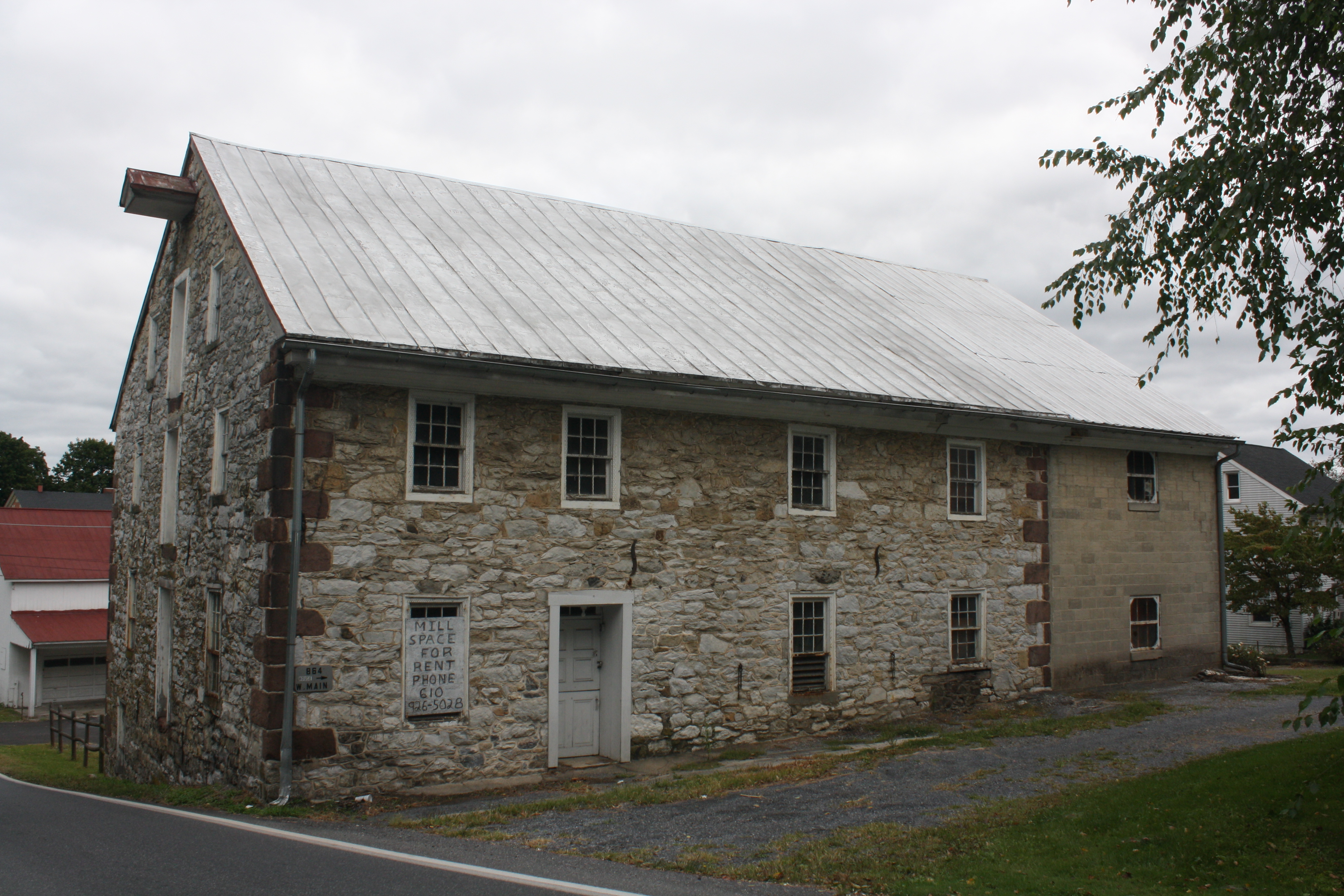
- Rieser Mill. September 2013.

- Location within Pennsylvania Location within the United States
- Location: Junction of Grange and Cross Keys Roads, Bern Township, Pennsylvania
- Coordinates: 40°25′55″N 75°58′37″W
- Area: 1 acre (0.40 ha)
- Built: 1784, 1825
- Architectural style: Gristmill
- MPS: Gristmills in Berks County MPS
- NRHP reference No.: 90001628
- Added to NRHP: November 8, 1990

The Rieser Mill is a historic American grist mill and miller's house complex located in Bern Township, Berks County, Pennsylvania. It was listed on the National Register of Historic Places in 1990.

== History and architectural features ==
Built in 1825, the mill is a 2 1/2-story stone building with a gable roof. The building replaced an earlier mill located on the same site. The miller's house is a T-shaped stone and brick dwelling built in 1784 and expanded in the late 1800s. The mill is located approximately 1/4-mile from the Rieser-Shoemaker Farm.

== Gallery ==
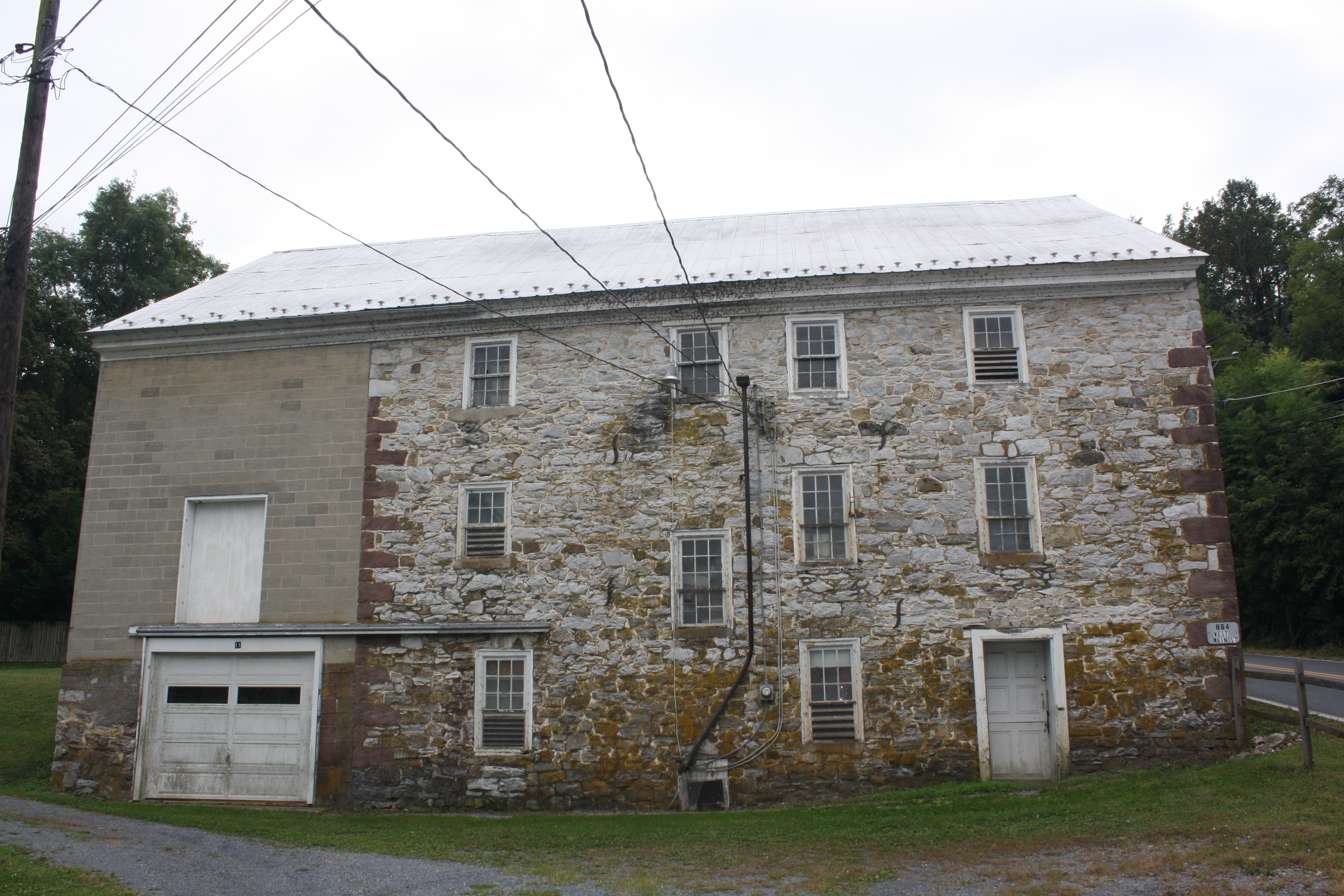
Rieser Mill, low bank

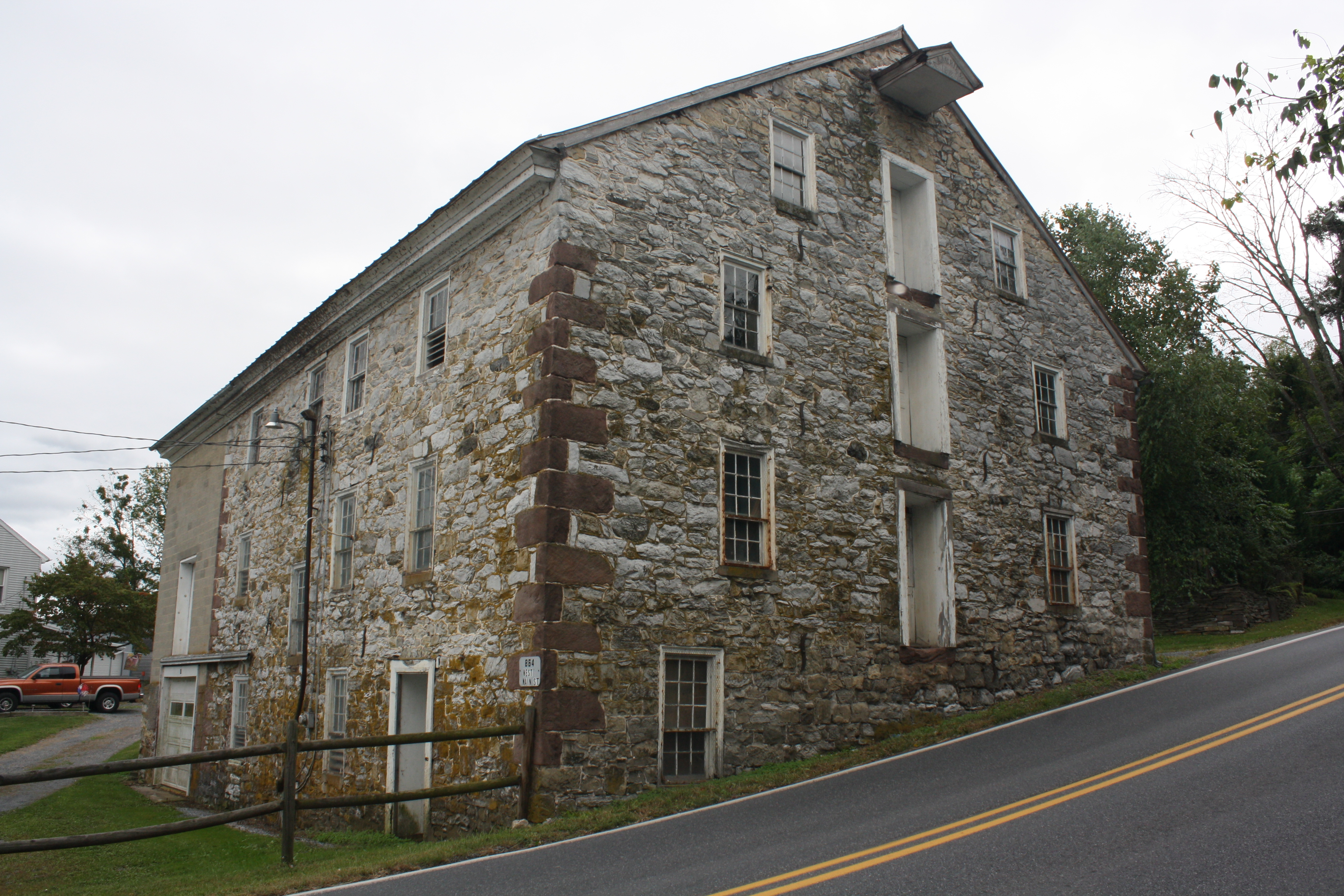
West side

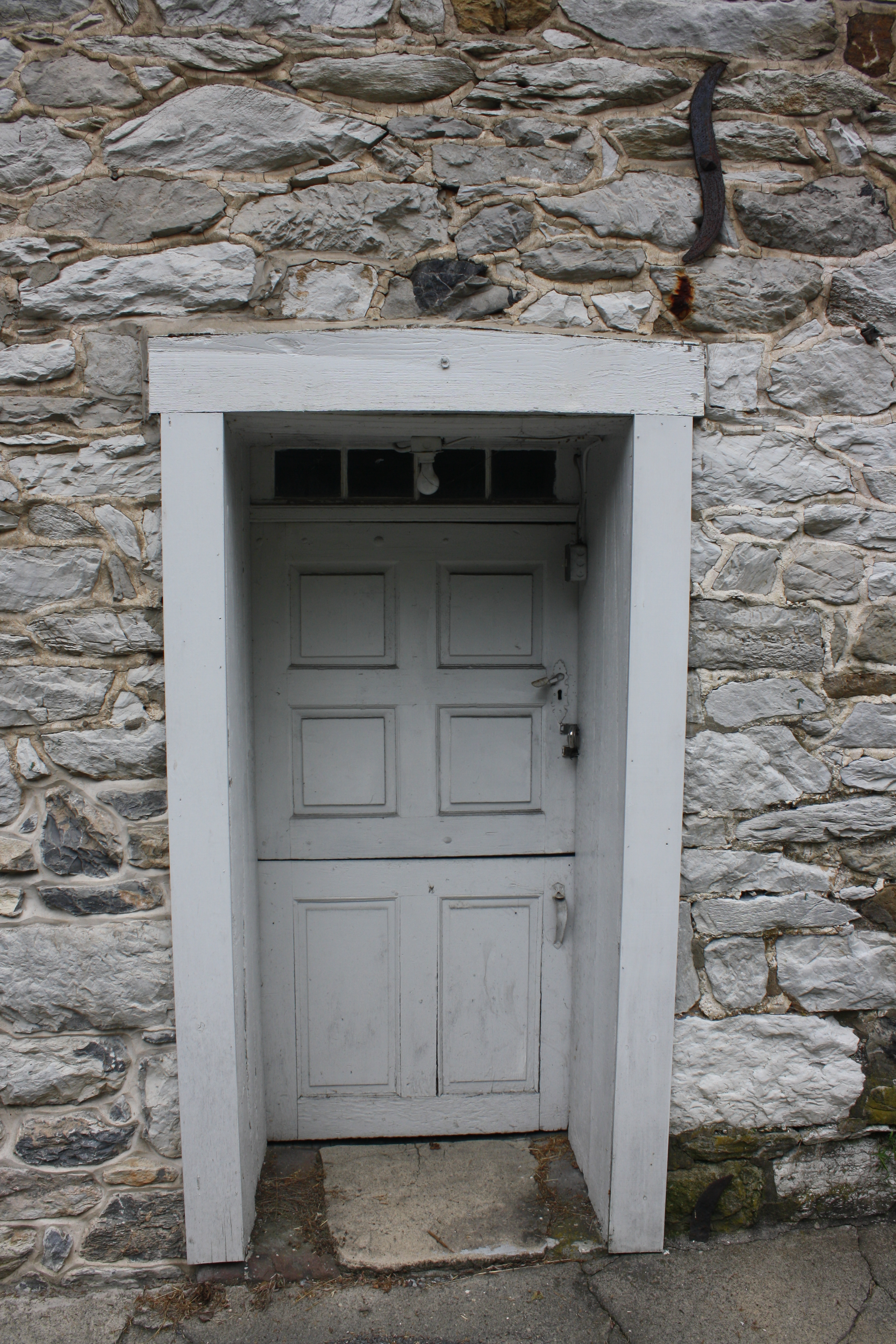
South side entrance

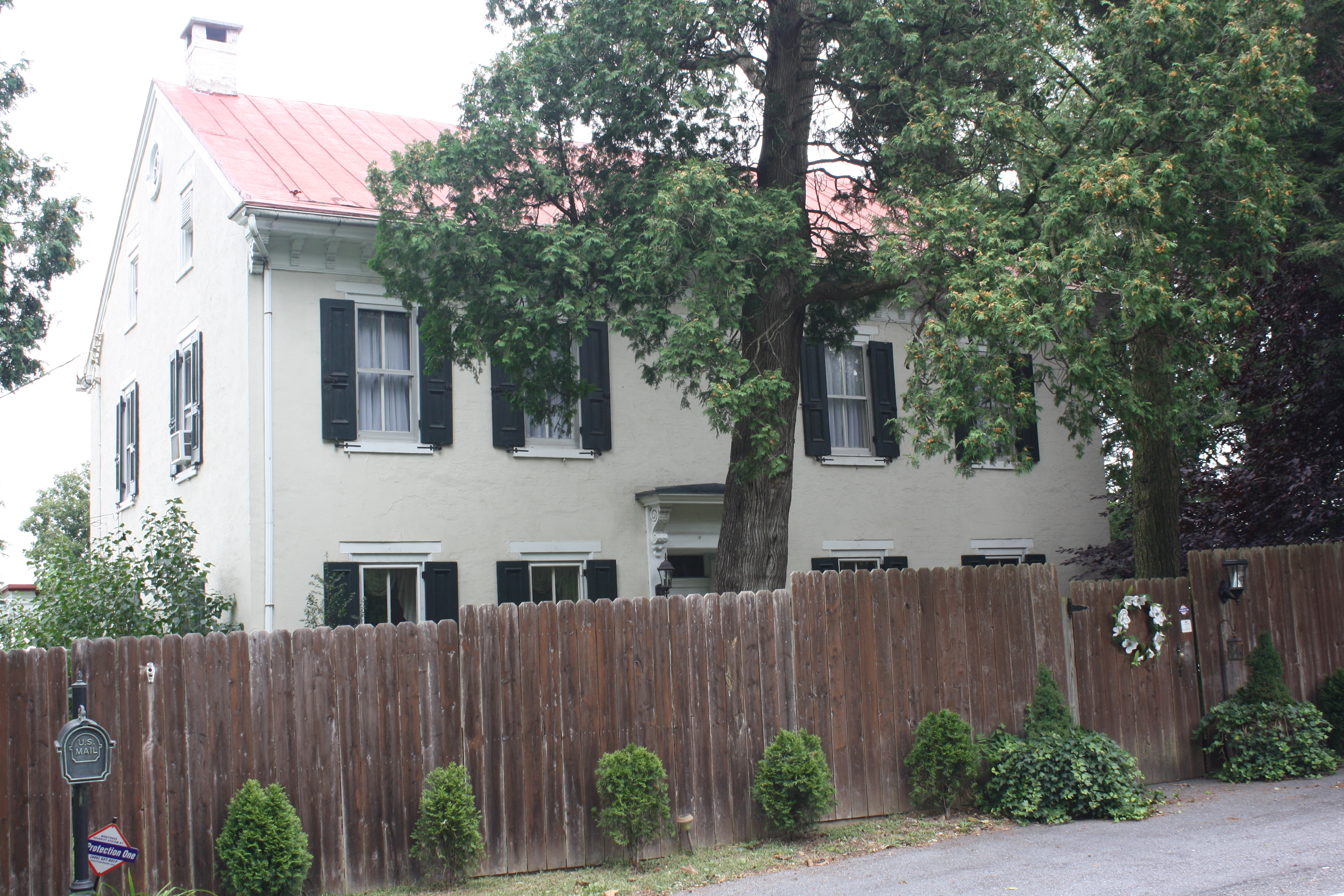
Miller's House

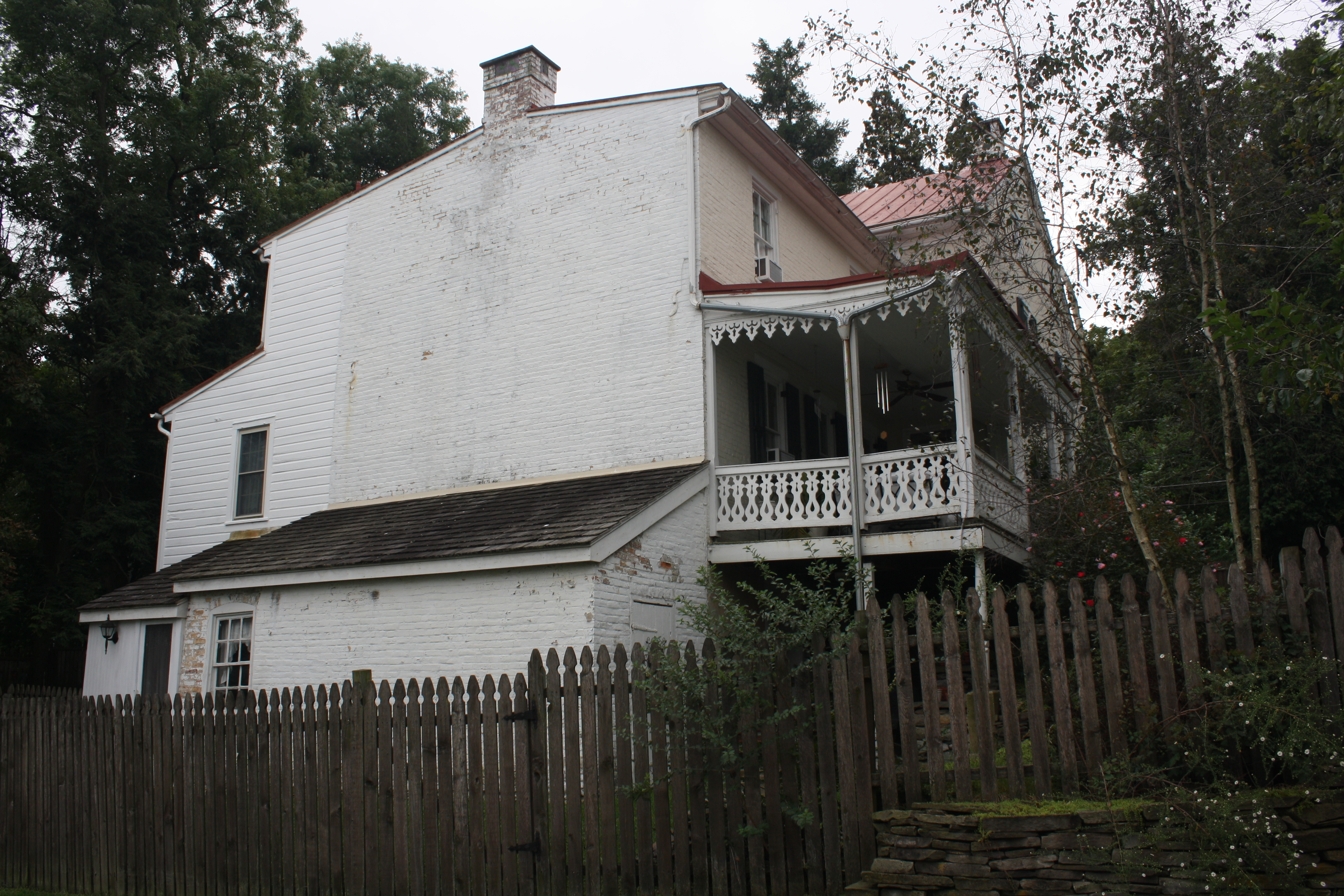
Miller's House, backyard
