= Riser =

Riser may refer to:

== Engineering ==
- Stair riser, the vertical elements in a set of stairs
- Audience risers, elevated platforms in theaters, classrooms, or other venues
- Riser, a length of vertically oriented piping used to deliver fluid, gas, or electrical signals or power upward
  - Drilling riser, a device used on a ship or offshore drilling rig
  - Dry riser, a pipe used to deliver water to firefighting systems that is normally kept empty (dry)
  - Riser cable, a type of communications cable used to connect multiple floors in a building
- Riser card, a printed circuit board which extends connectors away from another board
- Riser, a skateboard component which increases the space between the wheels and the deck
- Riser, the center section of a recurve bow
- Parachute riser, strip of webbing joining the harness to the rigging lines
- Riser (casting), a reservoir in a manufacturing mold

== People ==
- Matt Riser (born 1984), American college baseball coach
- Neil Riser (born 1962), a member of the Louisiana State Senate (United States)

== Other uses ==
- Riser, side of a terrace (geology)
- Early riser, a person who wakes up early in the day
- Riser Music, a Thai record label
- Riser (album), a 2014 studio album by Dierks Bentley
  - "Riser" (song), the title track
