= Bern Township, Pennsylvania =

Township in Pennsylvania, US

- Township
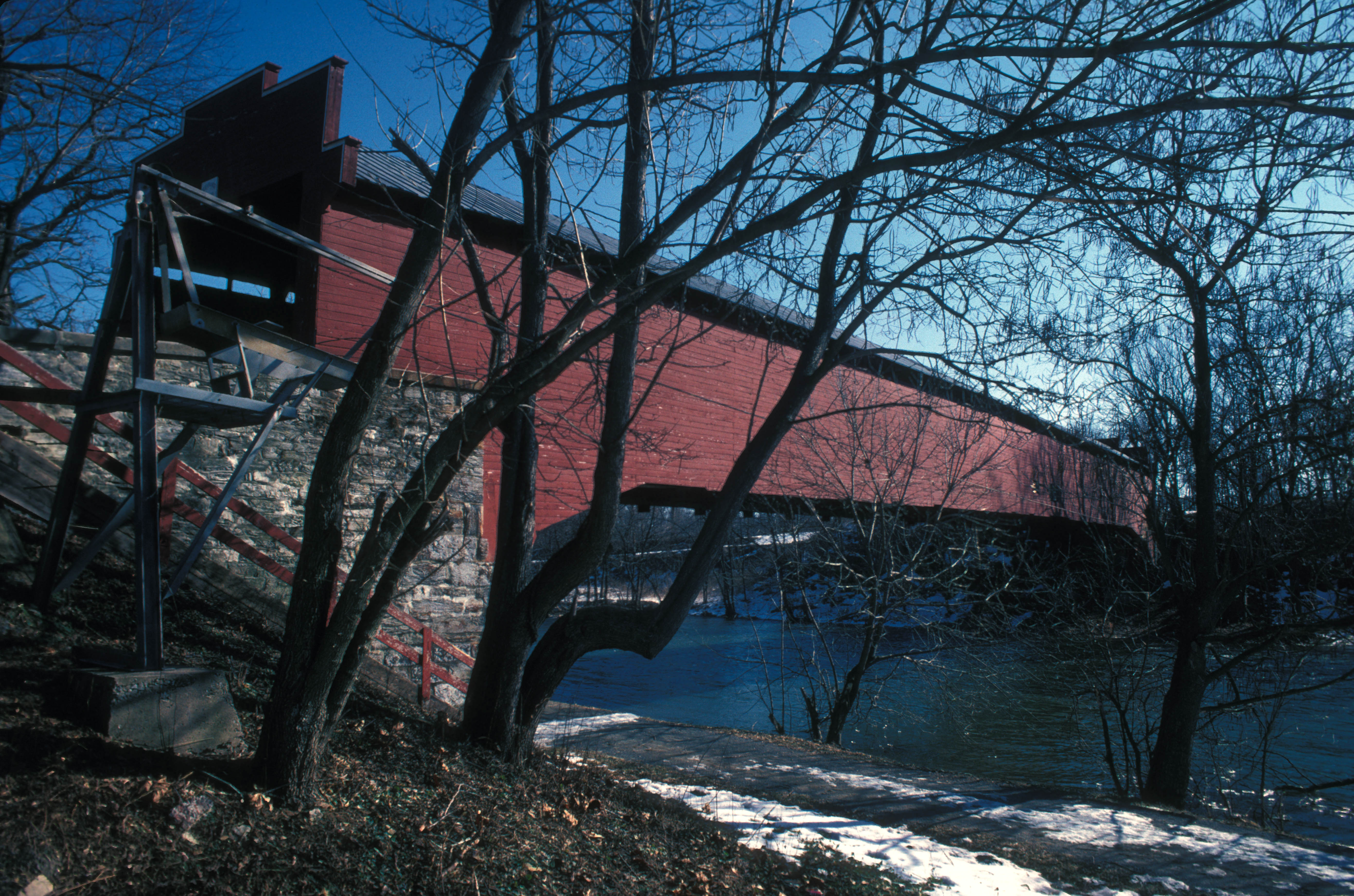
- Wertz's Covered Bridge

- Seal

- Location of Bern Township in Pennsylvania Bern Township (the United States)
- Coordinates: 40°23′54″N 75°59′30″W
- Country: United States
- State: Pennsylvania
- County: Berks
- Named for: Bern, Switzerland

Area
  - Total: 20.14 sq mi (52.17 km^{2})
  - Land: 19.35 sq mi (50.12 km^{2})
  - Water: 0.79 sq mi (2.05 km^{2})
- Elevation: 577 ft (176 m)

Population (2020)
  - Total: 6,609 ▼
  - Estimate (2021): 6,600
  - Density: 359.4/sq mi (138.76/km^{2})
- Time zone: UTC-5 (EST)
  - Summer (DST): UTC-4 (EDT)
- Area code: 610
- FIPS code: 42-011-05816
- Website: www.berntownship.org

Bern Township is a township in Berks County, Pennsylvania, United States. As of the 2020 census, the population is 6,609. The township is in Schuylkill Valley School District.

== History ==
The township was so named by Swiss settlers after Bern, Switzerland. The Rieser Mill, Rieser-Shoemaker Farm, Spannuth Mill, and Wertz's Covered Bridge are listed on the National Register of Historic Places.

== Geography ==
According to the U.S. Census Bureau, the township has a total area of 20.0 square miles (52 km^{2}), of which 19.1 square miles (49 km^{2}) is land and 0.8 square miles (2.1 km^{2}) (4.06%) is water. It contains the census-designated place of Greenfields.

Adjacent townships

- Penn – west
- Centre – north
- Ontelaunee – northeast
- Muhlenberg – east
- Spring – south
- Lower Heidelberg – southwest

Adjacent city and boroughs

- Reading – south
- Wyomissing – south
- Leesport – north

== Demographics ==
Historical population
Census	Pop.	Note	%±
1980	5,897		—
1990	5,748		−2.5%
2000	6,758		17.6%
2010	6,797		0.6%
2020	6,609		−2.8%
2021 (est.)	6,600		−0.1%
U.S. Decennial Census

At the 2010 census, there were 6,797 people, 2,080 households, and 1,560 families in the township. The population density was 355.9 inhabitants per square mile (137.4/km^{2}). There were 2,168 housing units at an average density of 113.5 per square mile (43.8/km^{2}). The racial makeup of the township was 91.0% White, 5.8% African American, 0.1% Native American, 0.7% Asian, 1.5% from other races, and 1.1% from two or more races. Hispanic or Latino of any race were 9.3% of the population.

There were 2,080 households, 27.6% had children under the age of 18 living with them, 64.3% were married couples living together, 6.5% had a female householder with no husband present, and 24.8% were non-families. 19.1% of households were made up of individuals, and 10.3% were one person aged 65 or older. The average household size was 2.51 and the average family size was 2.84. Bern Township is the location of the Berks County Prison System, which held 1545 prisoners, 22.7% of the township's population.

The age distribution was 16.0% under the age of 18, 8.8% from 18 to 24, 24.7% from 25 to 44, 29.4% from 45 to 64, and 21.1% 65 or older. The township hosts three of the county's 12 nursing homes for seniors. The median age was 45.3 years. For every 100 females there were 122.2 males. For every 100 females age 18 and over, there were 120.8 males.

The median household income was $61,222 and the median family income was $68,636. Males had a median income of $46,731 versus $26,694 for females. The per capita income for the township was $25,969. About 1.2% of families and 2.2% of the population were below the poverty line, including none of those under age 18 and 8.0% of those age 65 or over.

== Transportation ==
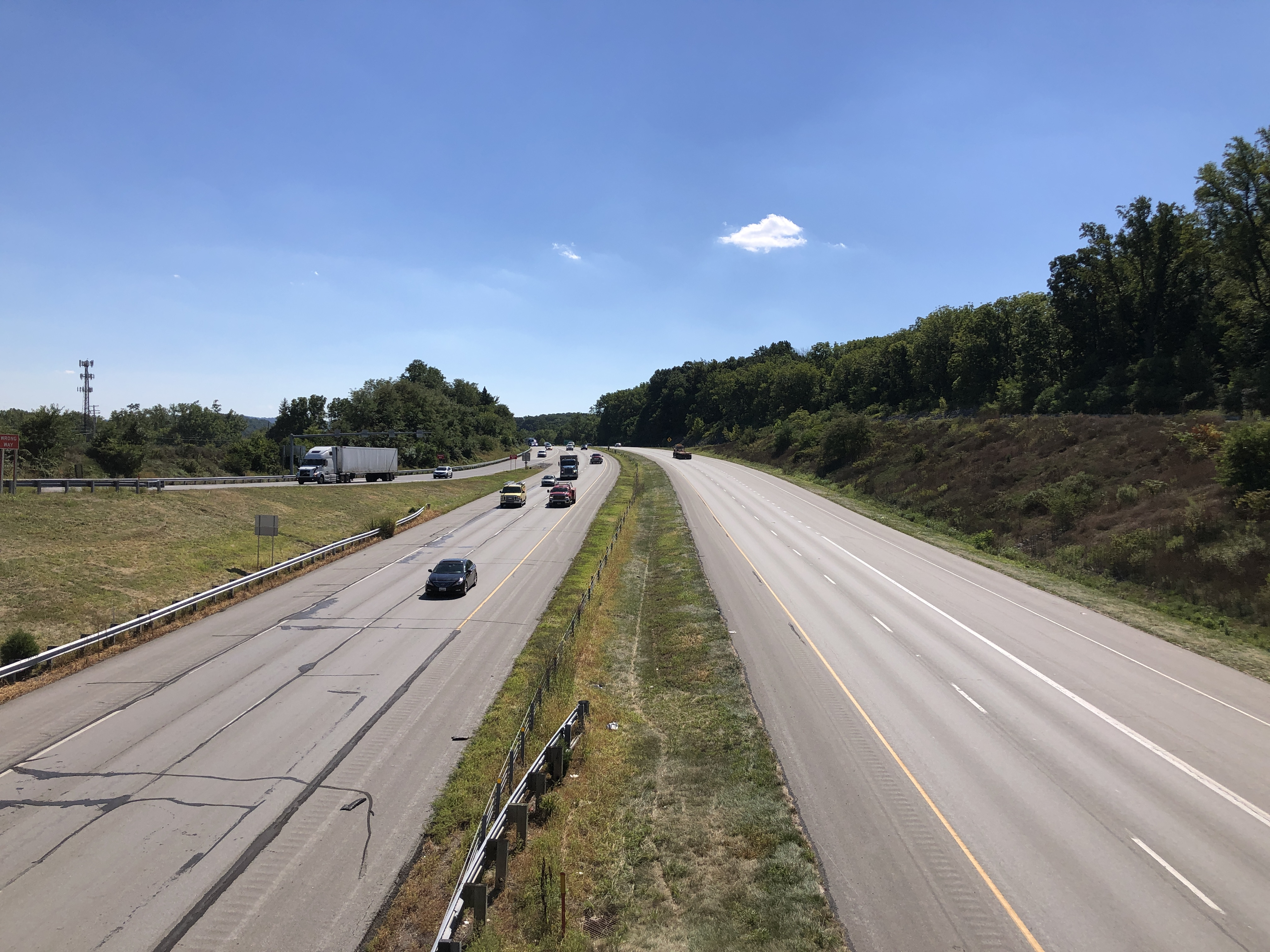
US 222 southbound in Bern Township

As of 2019, there were 73.74 miles (118.67 km) of public roads in Bern Township, of which 17.99 miles (28.95 km) were maintained by the Pennsylvania Department of Transportation (PennDOT) and 55.75 miles (89.72 km) were maintained by the township.

U.S. Route 222 is the most prominent highway serving Bern Township. It follows a southwest–northeast alignment across the southeastern part of the township. Pennsylvania Route 183 is the other numbered highway serving the township, following Bernville Road along a northwest–southeast alignment across the southern and western portions of the township.

Reading Regional Airport is located in the southeastern portion of the township.

== Recreation ==
The Youth Recreational Facility and a portion of the Pennsylvania State Game Lands Number 280 are located in the township.
