= Reiser =

Reiser is a German surname. It may refer to:

== People ==
- Charles Reiser, safecracker also known as "The Ox"
- Glenda Reiser, Canadian middle distance runner
- Hans Reiser, computer programmer and convicted murderer
- Hans Reiser (actor), German actor (The Great Escape)
- Jean-Marc Reiser, French comics artist
- John Reiser, race car driver and businessman from Wisconsin
- Kateryna Skarzhynska (née von Reiser), (1852-1932) Russian philanthropist
- Martin Reiser, attributed as originator of Wirth's law
- Niki Reiser (born 1958), German composer of film music
- Othmar Reiser, ornithologist
- Paul Reiser, actor who starred in the sitcom Mad About You
- Pete Reiser, baseball player also known as "Pistol Pete"
- Rio Reiser, musician in the band Ton Steine Scherben
- Robert A. Reiser, American academic
- Violet Reiser, American composer and organist

== Computers ==
- ReiserFS, a filesystem developed by Hans Reiser
- Reiser4, a newer filesystem developed by Hans Reiser

== See also ==
- Reser, a surname
