= Rieser–Shoemaker Farm =

- U.S. National Register of Historic Places
- U.S. Historic district
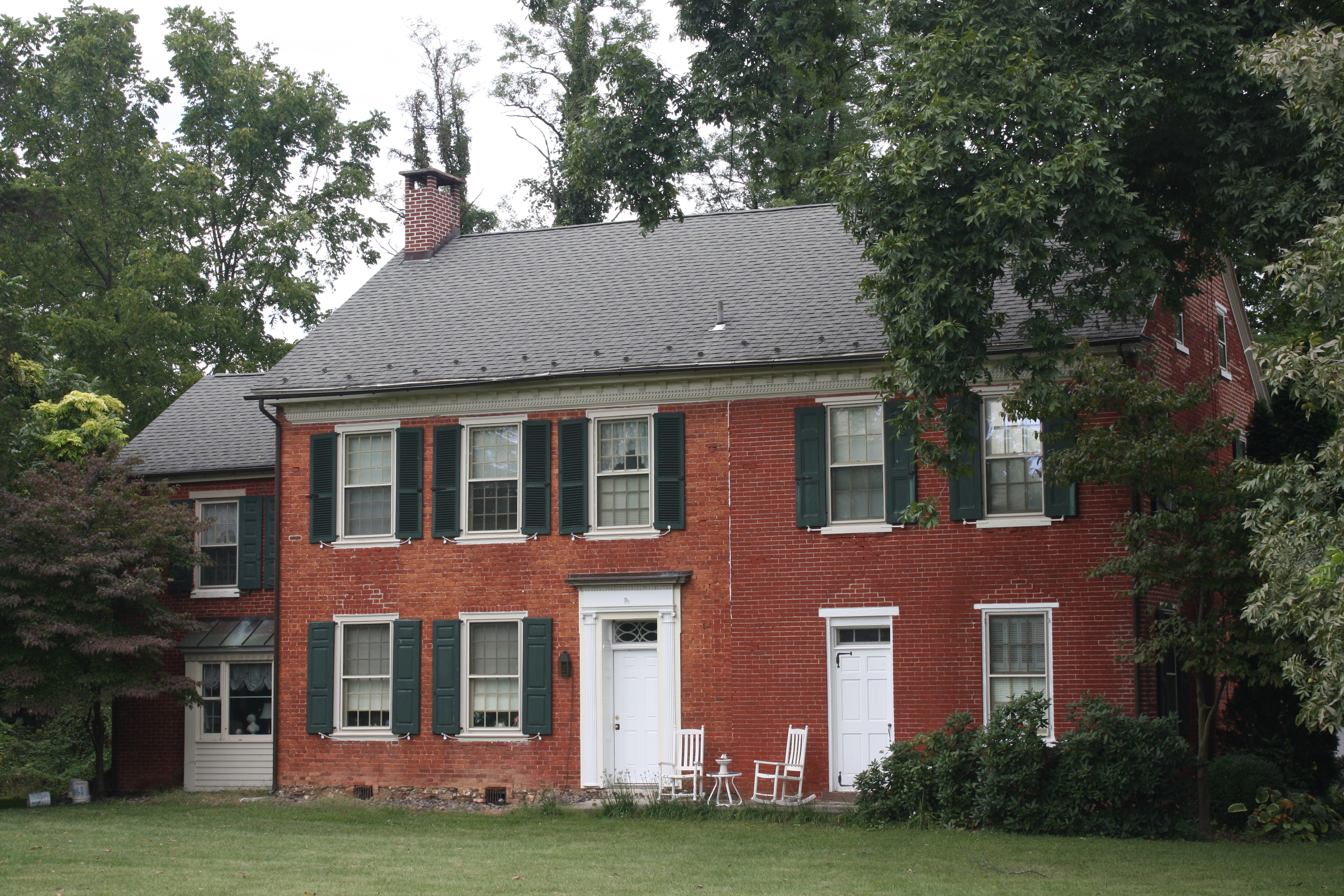
- Farmhouse, September 2013

- Location within Pennsylvania Location within the United States
- Location: Cross Keys Rd., Bern Township, Pennsylvania
- Coordinates: 40°25′51″N 75°58′25″W
- Area: 137 acres (55 ha)
- Built: c. 1820
- Architectural style: Federal, Pennsylvania bank barn
- MPS: Farms in Berks County MPS
- NRHP reference No.: 92000939
- Added to NRHP: July 29, 1992

The Rieser–Shoemaker Farm is an historic farm complex and national historic district that is located in Bern Township, Berks County, Pennsylvania, United States.

It was listed on the National Register of Historic Places in 1992.

== History and architectural features ==
This district has seven contributing buildings and two contributing structures. They are a two-and-one-half-story, brick, vernacular, Federal-style farmhouse (c. 1820), a stone, Pennsylvania bank barn (c. 1820), a group of stone, brick, and frame outbuildings (c. 1820-1930), and a stone walled spring. The original land grant for this property was made to Henry Reiser in 1725. The farm is located approximately one quarter of a mile from the Rieser Mill.

== Gallery ==
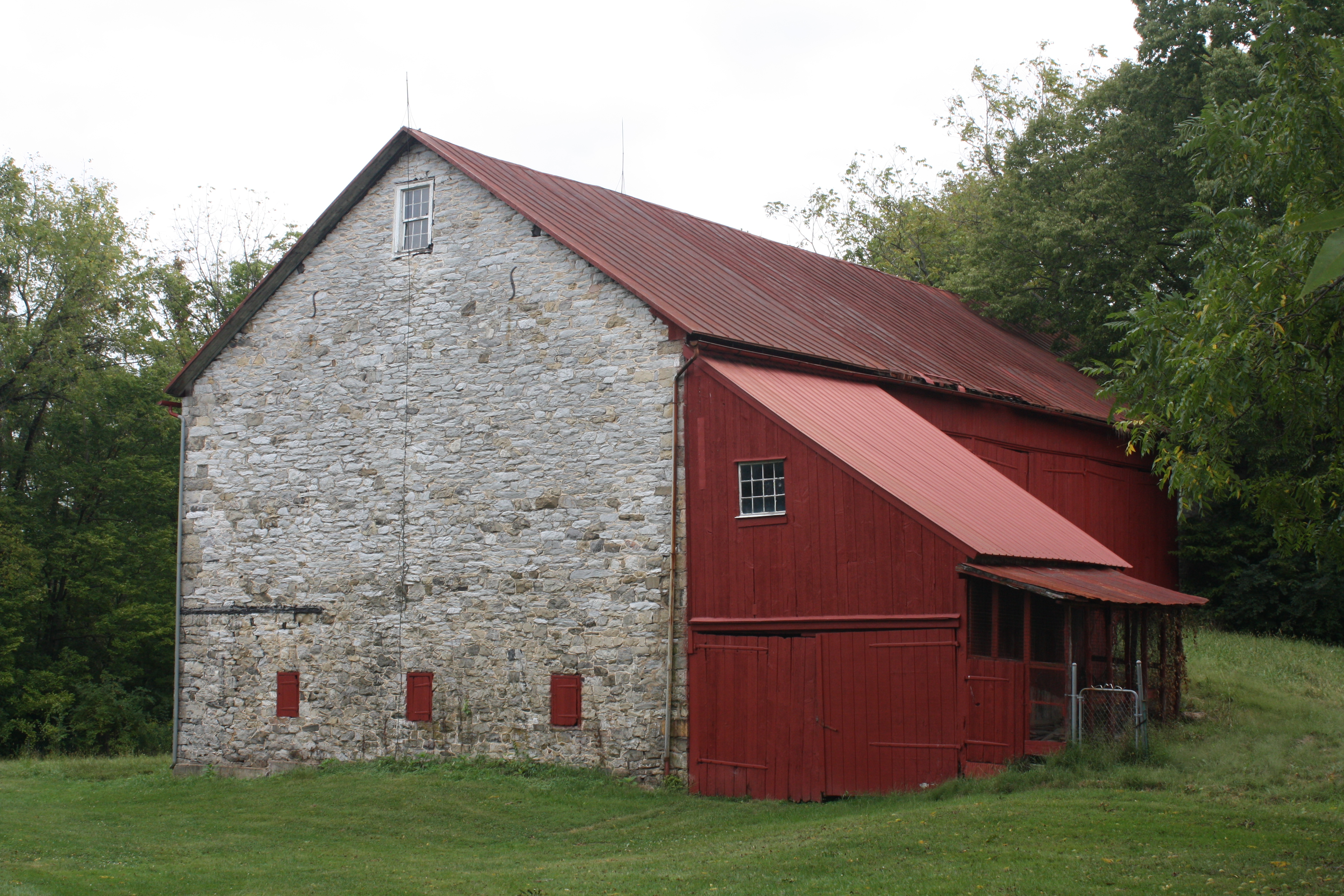
Farm Barn

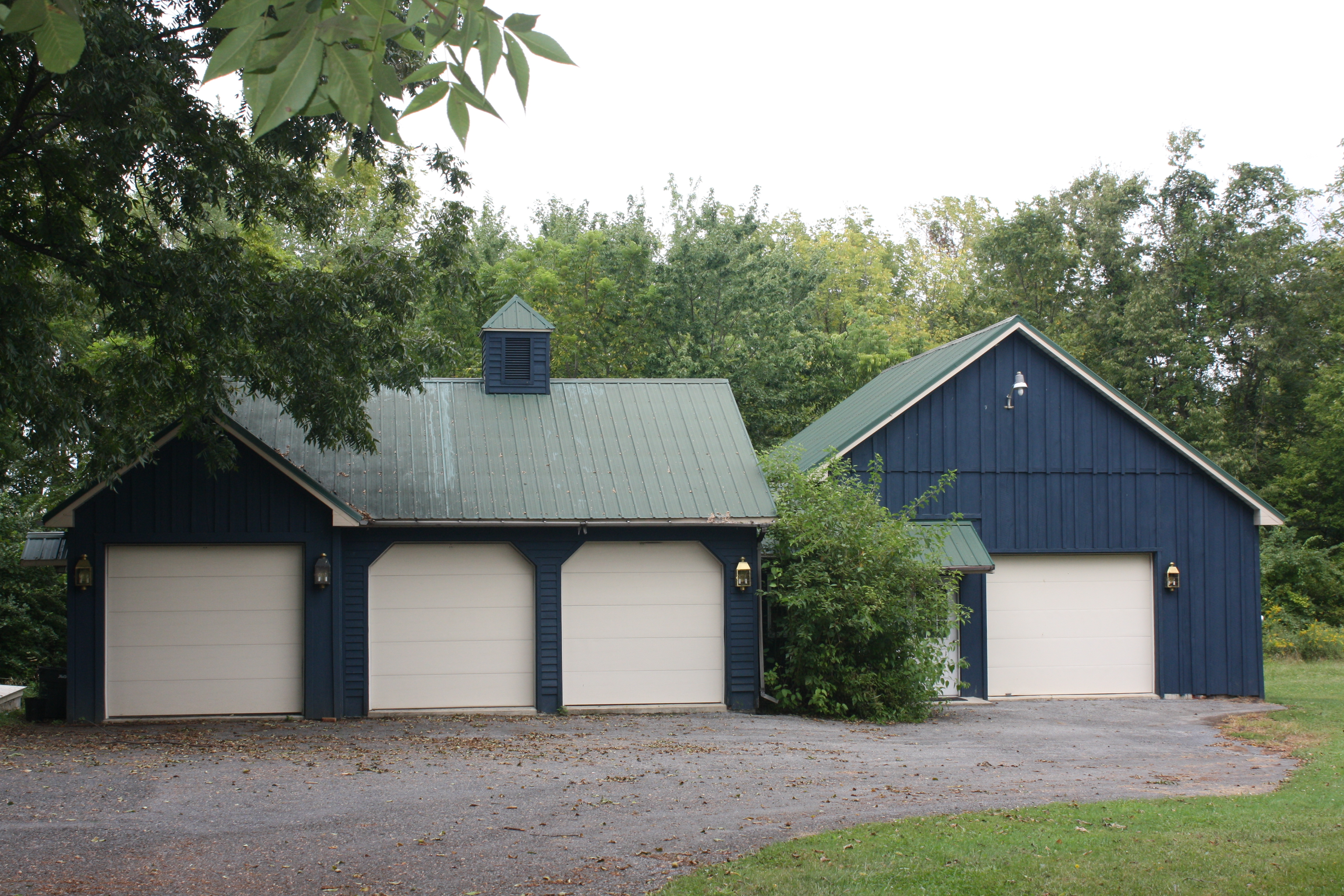
Garage and Wagonshed/corn crib
