= Reser =

Reser is a surname. Notable people with the surname include:

- Harry Reser (1896–1965), American banjo player and bandleader
- Ryan Reser (born 1980), American judoka

== See also ==
- Reiser (disambiguation)#People
