= South Heidelberg Township, Pennsylvania =

Township in Pennsylvania, US

South Heidelberg Township
- Township
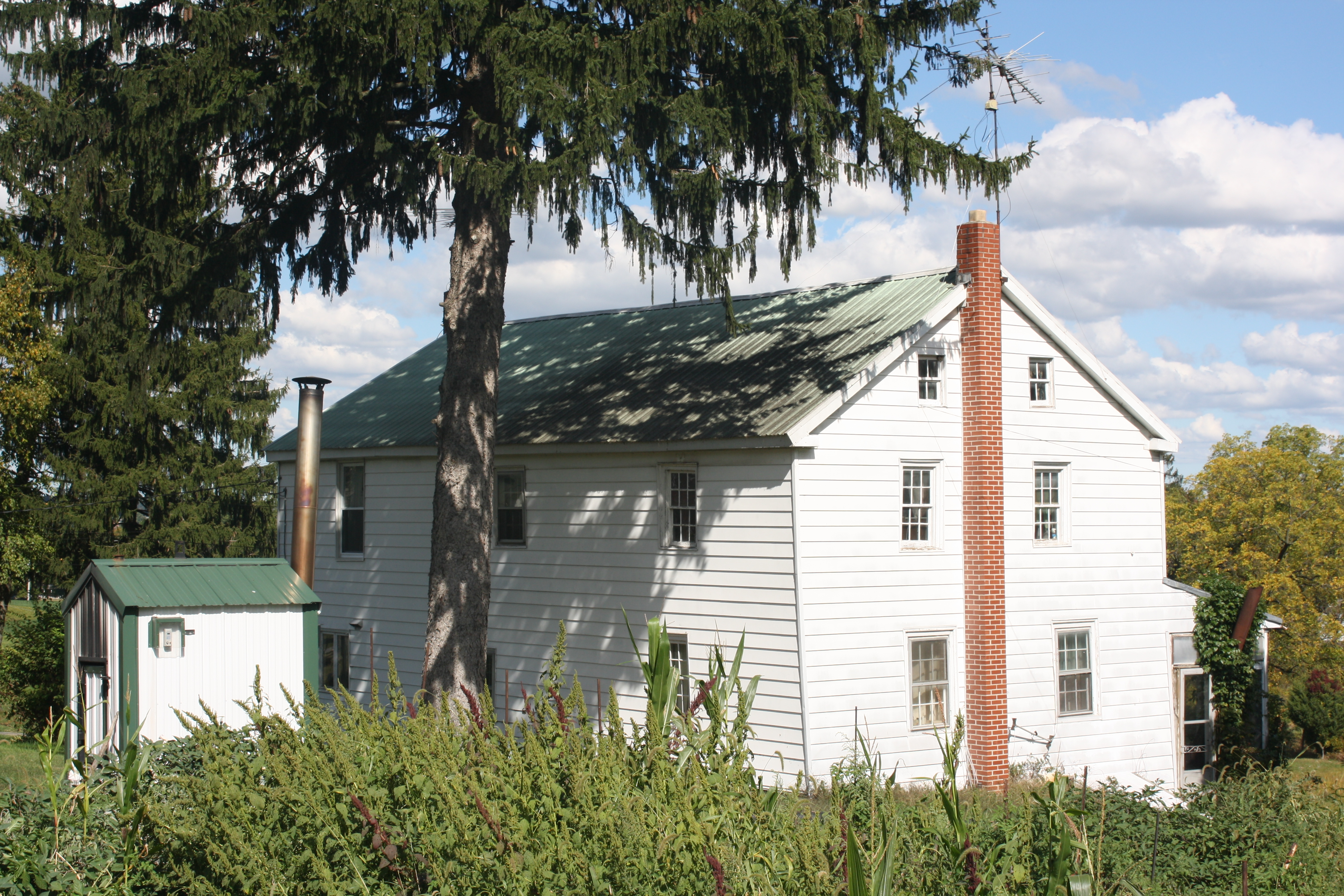
- Grand View Dairy Farm

- Location of South Heidelberg Township in Pennsylvania South Heidelberg Township (the United States)
- Coordinates: 40°18′50″N 76°05′30″W
- Country: United States
- State: Pennsylvania
- County: Berks

Area
  - Total: 13.86 sq mi (35.90 km^{2})
  - Land: 13.83 sq mi (35.81 km^{2})
  - Water: 0.035 sq mi (0.09 km^{2})
- Elevation: 610 ft (190 m)

Population (2010)
  - Total: 7,271
  - Estimate (2016): 7,352
  - Density: 531.8/sq mi (205.33/km^{2})
- Time zone: UTC-5 (EST)
  - Summer (DST): UTC-4 (EDT)
- Area code: 610
- FIPS code: 42-011-72208
- Website: https://www.shtwp.org/

South Heidelberg Township is a township in Berks County, Pennsylvania, United States. The population was 7,271 at the 2010 census.

== History ==
The Grand View Dairy Farm was listed on the National Register of Historic Places in 1992.

== Geography ==
According to the U.S. Census Bureau, the township has a total area of 13.8 square miles (35.6 km^{2}), all land. This once predominantly rural area is growing rapidly, with many new residential developments springing up throughout the township, especially near the borough of Wernersville.

Adjacent townships

- Heidelberg Township (northwest)
- Lower Heidelberg Township (north)
- Spring Township (east)
- East Cocalico Township, Lancaster County (far south)
- West Cocalico Township, Lancaster County (south)

The borough of Wernersville is located on the north side of the township, but is politically independent. Also, the borough of Sinking Spring touches the eastern corner of the township.

== Demographics ==
At the 2000 census there were 5,491 people, 1,947 households, and 1,516 families living in the township. The population density was 399.1 inhabitants per square mile (154.1/km^{2}). There were 2,027 housing units at an average density of 147.3 per square mile (56.9/km^{2}). The racial makeup of the township was 96.70% White, 1.46% African American, 0.04% Native American, 0.46% Asian, 0.76% from other races, and 0.58% from two or more races. Hispanic or Latino of any race were 1.57%.

Historical population
Census	Pop.	Note	%±
1980	3,355		—
1990	4,382		30.6%
2000	5,491		25.3%
2010	7,271		32.4%
2016 (est.)	7,352		1.1%
Source: US Census Bureau

There were 1,947 households, 34.7% had children under the age of 18 living with them, 70.6% were married couples living together, 4.8% had a female householder with no husband present, and 22.1% were non-families. 17.7% of households were made up of individuals, and 6.8% were one person aged 65 or older. The average household size was 2.64 and the average family size was 3.00.

The age distribution was 24.2% under the age of 18, 5.1% from 18 to 24, 31.5% from 25 to 44, 27.4% from 45 to 64, and 11.8% 65 or older. The median age was 40 years. For every 100 females there were 105.5 males. For every 100 females age 18 and over, there were 102.8 males.

The median household income was $57,417 and the median family income was $66,618. Males had a median income of $44,471 versus $28,528 for females. The per capita income for the township was $23,266. About 0.5% of families and 6.1% of the population were below the poverty line, including 0.6% of those under age 18 and 3.1% of those age 65 or over.

== Recreation ==
Most of the Pennsylvania State Game Lands Number 274 is located along the western border of the township.

== Transportation ==
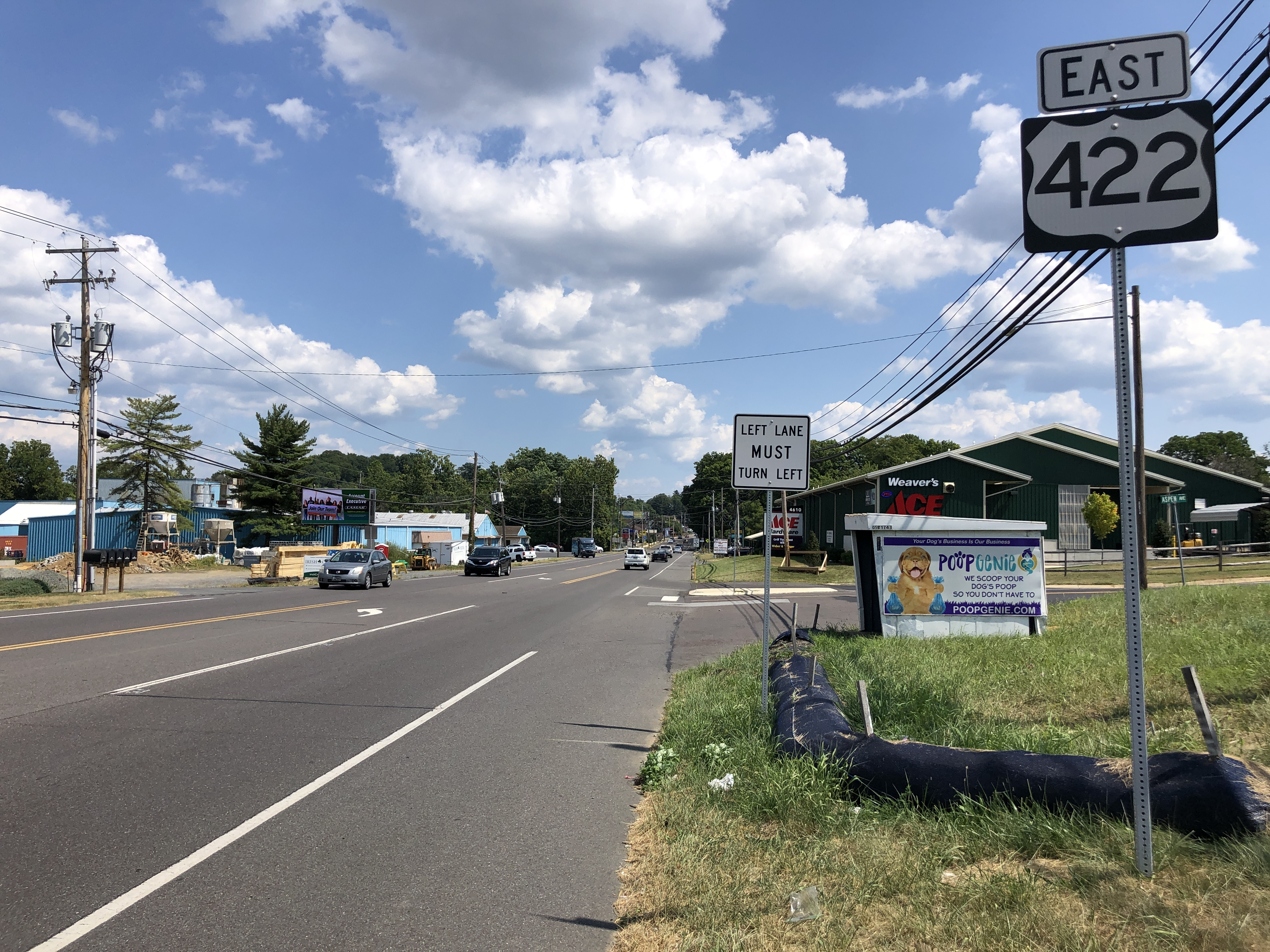
US 422 eastbound along the northern edge of South Heidelberg Township

As of 2017, there were 64.24 miles (103.38 km) of public roads in South Heidelberg Township, of which 4.47 miles (7.19 km) were maintained by the Pennsylvania Department of Transportation (PennDOT) and 59.77 miles (96.19 km) were maintained by the township.

U.S. Route 422 is the only numbered highway serving South Heidelberg Township. It follows an east–west alignment across the north edge of the township.
