= Sinking Spring, Pennsylvania =

Borough in Pennsylvania, US

- Borough
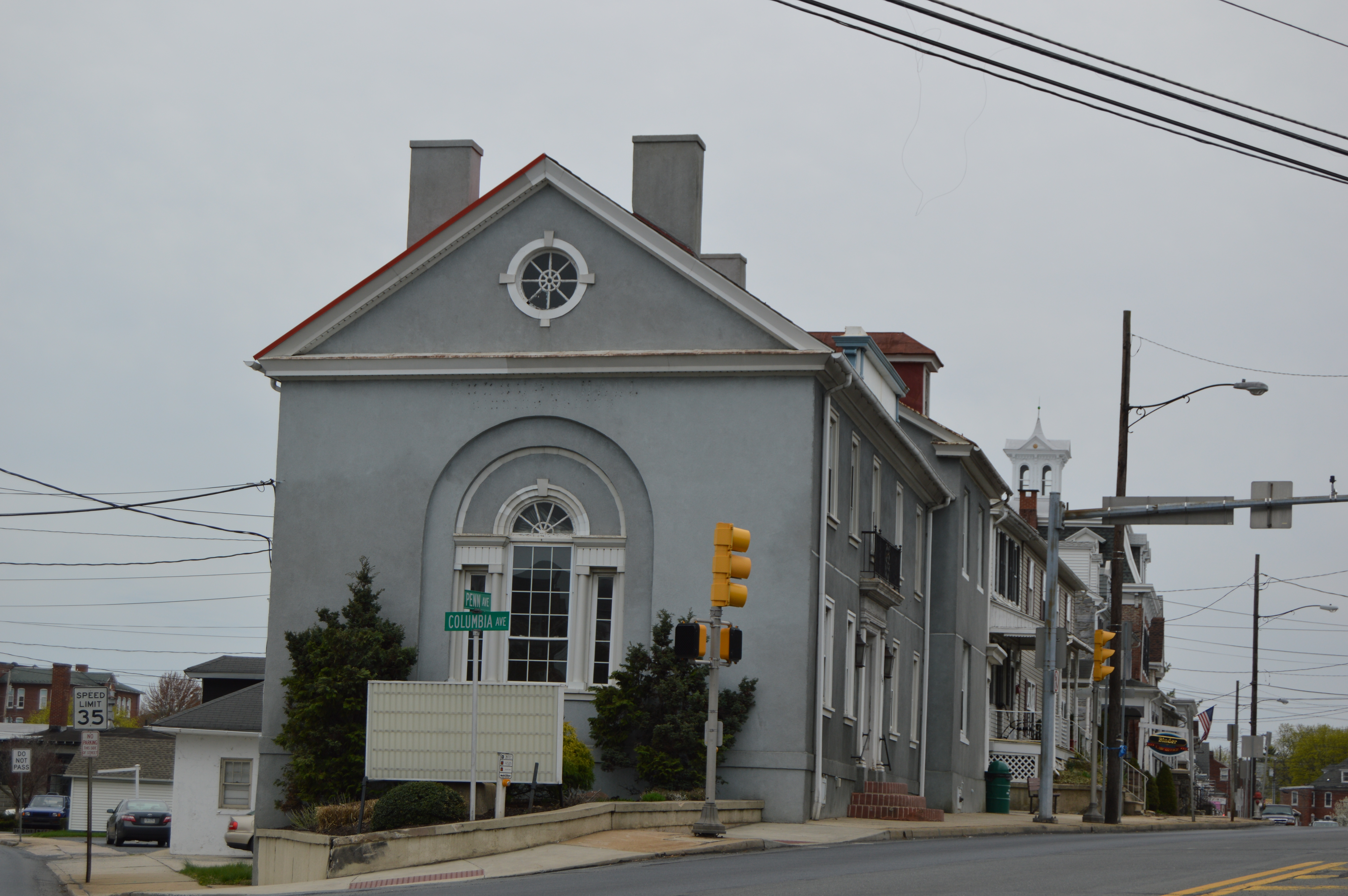
- Penn Avenue in the commercial district

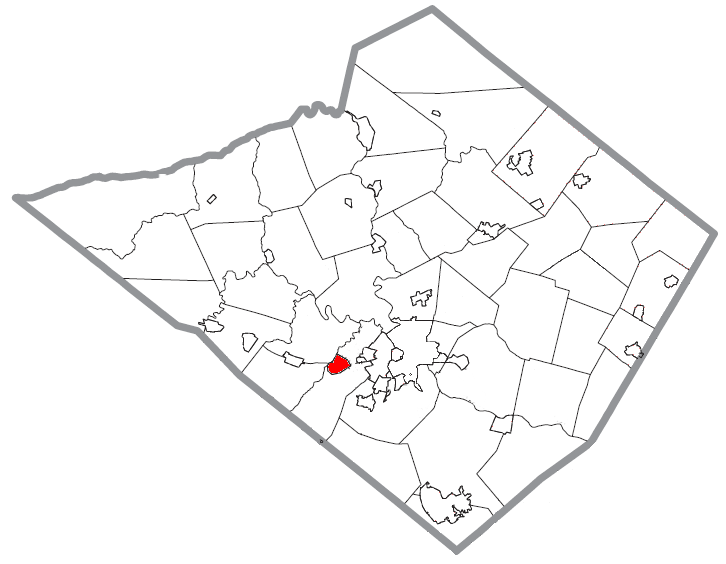
- Location in Berks County, Pennsylvania

- Location in Pennsylvania Location in the United States
- Coordinates: 40°19′29″N 76°01′21″W
- Country: United States
- State: Pennsylvania
- County: Berks
- Incorporated: March 13, 1913

Government
  - Mayor: Gary Cirulli

Area
  - Total: 1.24 sq mi (3.22 km^{2})
  - Land: 1.24 sq mi (3.21 km^{2})
  - Water: 0.0039 sq mi (0.01 km^{2})
- Elevation: 338 ft (103 m)

Population (2020)
  - Total: 4,286
  - Density: 3,455/sq mi (1,333.8/km^{2})
- Time zone: UTC-5 (EST)
  - Summer (DST): UTC-4 (EDT)
- ZIP Code: 19608
- Area codes: 610 & 484
- FIPS code: 42-70880
- Website: sinkingspringboro.org

Sinking Spring is a borough that is located in Berks County, Pennsylvania, United States. The population was 4,286 at the time of the 2020 census.

The borough's name was derived from a spring that was located in the center of town. The water in this spring would sink into the ground from time to time, giving the illusion that it had disappeared. The Sinking Spring area is served by the Wilson School District.

== History ==
The Indigenous people who first inhabited this area were the Lenni Lenape (meaning the "original people"). The tribe in this immediate area was the Minsi or Wolf tribe. Inhabitants in the Sinking Spring area reportedly called the main spring the sunken spring. White settlers later called it the "sinking spring."

Penn Avenue is the main thoroughfare of Sinking Spring. There is a stone monument in the 3800 block of Penn Avenue. The borough, which has a large number of underground streams that carve out limestone and form sinkholes, was incorporated on March 13, 1913.

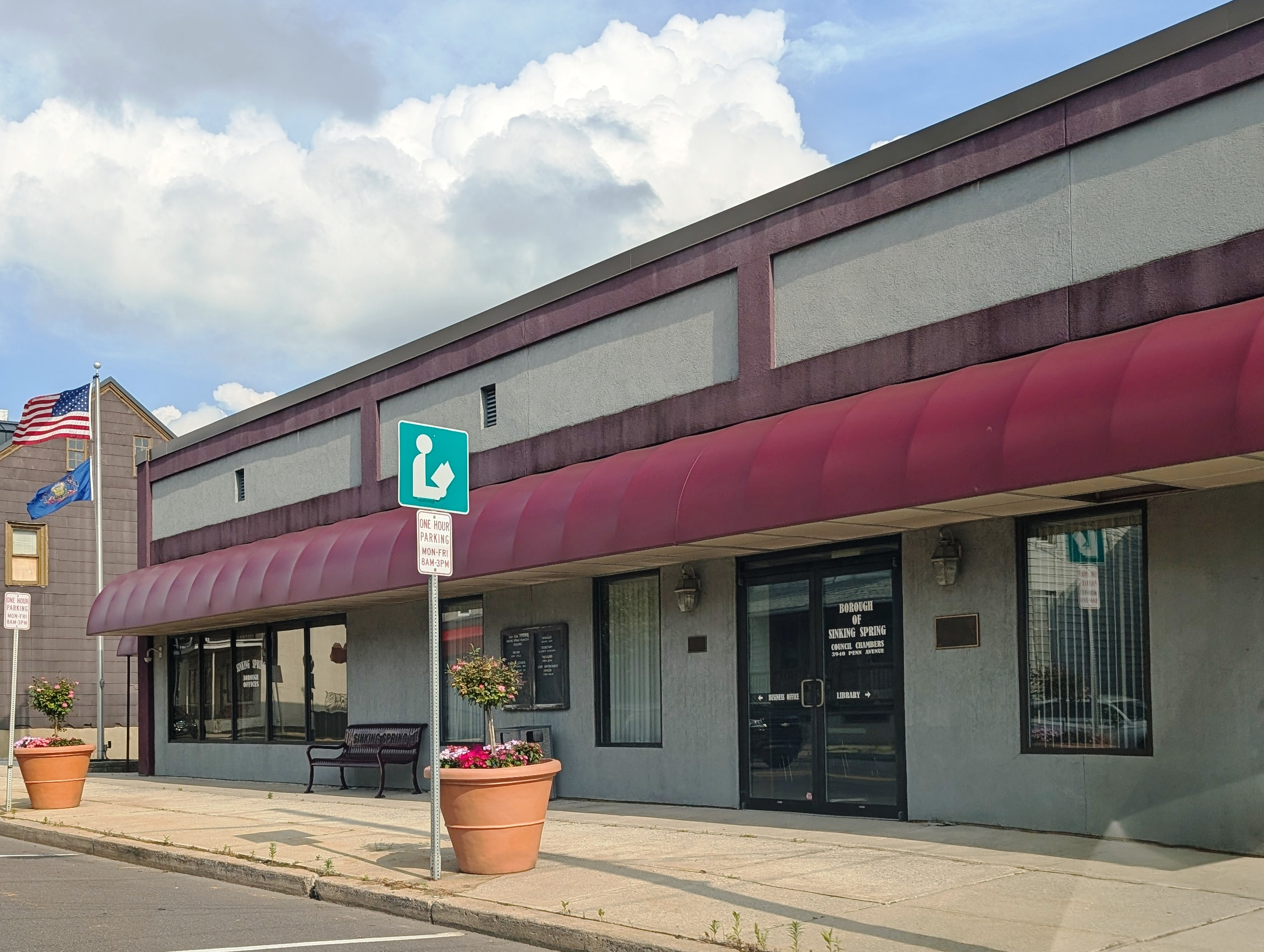
Borough Hall and library

== Geography and climate ==
According to the United States Census Bureau, the borough has a total area of 1.4 square miles (3.6 km^{2}), all land.

The borough has a hot-summer humid continental climate (Dfa) and average monthly temperatures range from 30.4 °F in January to 75.6 °F in July. The local hardiness zone is 6b bordering 7a.

== Demographics ==
Historical population
Census	Pop.	Note	%±
1880	517		—
1920	1,270		—
1930	1,771		39.4%
1940	1,861		5.1%
1950	1,982		6.5%
1960	2,244		13.2%
1970	2,862		27.5%
1980	2,617		−8.6%
1990	2,467		−5.7%
2000	2,639		7.0%
2010	4,008		51.9%
2020	4,286		6.9%
U.S. Decennial Census

=== 2020 census ===
As of the 2020 census, Sinking Spring had a population of 4,286. The median age was 38.5 years. 23.4% of residents were under the age of 18 and 14.5% of residents were 65 years of age or older. For every 100 females there were 94.6 males, and for every 100 females age 18 and over there were 93.2 males age 18 and over.

100.0% of residents lived in urban areas, while 0.0% lived in rural areas.

There were 1,758 households in Sinking Spring, of which 32.4% had children under the age of 18 living in them. Of all households, 42.0% were married-couple households, 21.0% were households with a male householder and no spouse or partner present, and 28.7% were households with a female householder and no spouse or partner present. About 29.7% of all households were made up of individuals and 11.2% had someone living alone who was 65 years of age or older.

There were 1,817 housing units, of which 3.2% were vacant. The homeowner vacancy rate was 0.8% and the rental vacancy rate was 4.6%.

Racial composition as of the 2020 census
Race	Number	Percent
White	3,078	71.8%
Black or African American	300	7.0%
American Indian and Alaska Native	11	0.3%
Asian	168	3.9%
Native Hawaiian and Other Pacific Islander	0	0.0%
Some other race	295	6.9%
Two or more races	434	10.1%
Hispanic or Latino (of any race)	748	17.5%

=== 2000 census ===
As of the census of 2000, there were 2,639 people, 1,233 households, and 748 families residing in the borough. The population density was 1,960.7 inhabitants per square mile (757.0/km^{2}). There were 1,269 housing units at an average density of 942.8 per square mile (364.0/km^{2}). The racial makeup of the borough was 95.76% White, 1.06% African American, 0.15% Native American, 0.80% Asian, 1.21% from other races, and 1.02% from two or more races. Hispanic or Latino of any race were 2.73% of the population.

There were 1,233 households, out of which 23.3% had children under the age of 18 living with them, 46.6% were married couples living together, 10.8% had a female householder with no husband present, and 39.3% were non-families. 33.0% of all households were made up of individuals, and 14.8% had someone living alone who was 65 years of age or older. The average household size was 2.14 and the average family size was 2.72.

In the borough the population was spread out, with 19.6% under the age of 18, 6.7% from 18 to 24, 30.6% from 25 to 44, 20.5% from 45 to 64, and 22.5% who were 65 years of age or older. The median age was 40 years. For every 100 females there were 89.9 males. For every 100 females age 18 and over, there were 89.2 males.

The median income for a household in the borough was $35,078, and the median income for a family was $50,064. Males had a median income of $36,875 versus $24,635 for females. The per capita income for the borough was $23,053. About 12.0% of families and 11.6% of the population were below the poverty line, including 18.9% of those under age 18 and 14.8% of those age 65 or over.

== Business and industry ==
Several oil and gas pipeline, terminal, and distribution companies are located in Sinking Spring near the village of Montello.

The Sunoco Logistics Montello Complex is the company's Eastern Pipeline System headquarters, as well as a local trucking terminal and a major midstream terminal for refined products, mostly originating from the Philadelphia and Marcus Hook refineries. Sunoco's pipelines out of Montello provide gasoline, diesel fuel, and heating oil to large markets in Pittsburgh, Buffalo, and Rochester, as well as smaller markets near Harrisburg, Altoona, Williamsport, Tamaqua, and Kingston in Pennsylvania and the Elmira/Corning area in New York state.

Also located in Sinking Spring is "Alcon Precision Device" facility, used for the production of disposable, single and multi-use medical devices. The devices are manufactured for eye surgeries around the world, including cataract and vit surgerie, including the scalpels and sutures used for such surgeries. Alcon is a division of one of the world's largest pharmaceutical companies, Novartis.

== Transportation ==
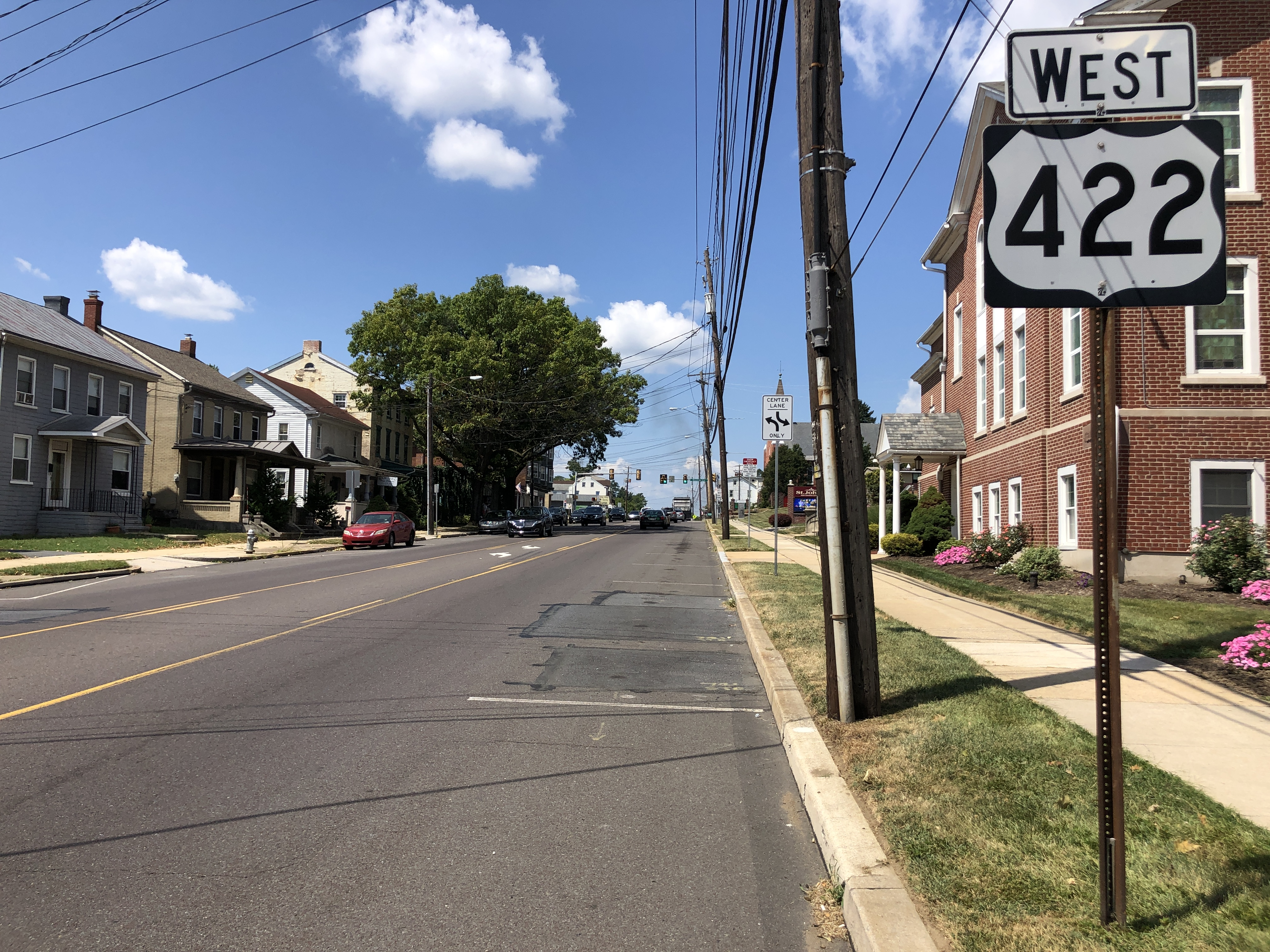
US 422 westbound in Sinking Spring

As of 2007, there were 13.58 miles (21.85 km) of public roads in Sinking Spring, of which 3.67 miles (5.91 km) were maintained by the Pennsylvania Department of Transportation (PennDOT) and 9.91 miles (15.95 km) were maintained by the borough.

U.S. Route 422 and Pennsylvania Route 724 are the numbered highways serving Sinking Spring. US 422 follows an east-west alignment along Penn Avenue through the center of the borough. PA 724 heads southeast from US 422 along Shillington Road across the southeastern portion of the borough.

Sinking Spring is also served by BARTA bus Route 14.

== Notable people ==
- John H. Addams, was a politician and businessman
- Kenny Brightbill, former NASCAR and professional dirt modified driver
- Lori and George Schappell, Conjoined twins, were born here
- Paul Specht, was an American dance bandleader popular in the 1920s
- Shane Stafford, former arena football quarterback
