= Statewide opinion polling for the 2012 United States presidential election =

2012 United States presidential election polling
- November 6, 2012

Leading Presidential 2012 candidate by electoral vote count. States in gray have no polling data. Polls from lightly shaded states are older than August 1, 2012 (and no more recent polls are available).
- Barack Obama 218 Mitt Romney 183 Difference within the margin of error 130 No data^{*} 13 (270 electoral votes needed to win)^{*} 2 of Maine's congressional electoral votes and 2 of Nebraska's congressional electoral votes have not been polled. Light shading indicates old polling data.
President before election
Barack Obama
Democratic
Elected President
Barack Obama
Democratic

Statewide public opinion polls that were conducted relating to the 2012 United States presidential election, which was won by incumbent President Barack Obama, are as follows. The polls show the status between Republican nominee Mitt Romney and President Obama. Also included are three- and four-way race polls with the Republican and Democratic nominees against various third party candidates.

== Opinion polling: Obama vs Romney ==
Sample size key:

LV – Likely Voters
RV – Registered Voters.

Poll source key

(R) – Source polls normally for Republicans
(D) – Source polls normally for Democrats

=== Alabama ===
9 electoral votes
(Republican in 2004) 62%–38%
(Republican in 2008) 60%–38%

=== Alaska ===
3 electoral votes
(Republican in 2004) 61%–35%
(Republican in 2008) 59%–37%

No polls conducted

=== Arizona ===
11 electoral votes
(Republican in 2004) 55%–44%
(Republican in 2008) 53%–45%

Poll source	Date administered	Democrat	%	Republican	%	Lead margin	Sample Size	Margin of error
Public Policy Polling	November 2–3, 2012	Obama	46%	Romney	53%	7	1080 LV	±3.0%
YouGov	October 31–November 3, 2012	Obama	44%	Romney	52%	8	702 LV	±4.1%
Rasmussen Reports/Pulse Opinion Research	October 21, 2012	Obama	44%	Romney	52%	8	500 LV	±4.5%
YouGov	October 4–11, 2012	Obama	43%	Romney	52%	9	469 LV	±5.4%
Behavior Research Center (Rocky Mountain Poll)	October 4–10, 2012	Obama	44%	Romney	42%	2	523 LV	±4.4%
Public Policy Polling	October 1–3, 2012	Obama	44%	Romney	53%	9	595 LV	±4.0%
Moore Information/HighGround (R)	September 25–26, 2012	Obama	42%	Romney	46%	4	500 LV	±4%
Rasmussen Reports	September 25, 2012	Obama	42%	Romney	52%	10	500 LV	±4.5%
Purple Strategies	September 15–19, 2012	Obama	45%	Romney	48%	3	600 LV	±4.0%
YouGov	September 7–14, 2012	Obama	41%	Romney	51%	10	628 LV	Not reported
Public Policy Polling	September 7–9, 2012	Obama	44%	Romney	53%	9	993	±3.1%

=== Arkansas ===
6 electoral votes
(Republican in 2004) 54%–45%
(Republican in 2008) 59%–39%

Poll source	Date administered	Democrat	%	Republican	%	Lead margin	Sample Size	Margin of error
The Arkansas Poll	October 9–14, 2012	Obama	31%	Romney	58%	27	642 LV	±4%
Talk Business/Hendrix College	September 17, 2012	Obama	34.5%	Romney	55.5%	21	2228 LV	±2%

=== California ===
55 electoral votes
(Democratic in 2004) 54%–44%
(Democratic in 2008) 61%–37%

Poll source	Date administered	Democrat	%	Republican	%	Lead margin	Sample Size	Margin of error
YouGov	October 31 – November 3, 2012	Obama	55%	Romney	40%	15	1,575 LV	Not reported
Field Research	October 17–30, 2012	Obama	54%	Romney	39%	15	1,566 LV	±2.6%
CBRT/Pepperdine University/M4 Strategies	October 21–28, 2012	Obama	55.9%	Romney	33%	22.9	2,115 LV	±3%
USC Dornsife/Los Angeles Times/Greenberg Quinlan Rosner/American Viewpoint	October 15–21, 2012	Obama	55%	Romney	38%	17	1,400 LV	Not reported
Public Policy Institute of California	October 14–21, 2012	Obama	53%	Romney	41%	12	993 LV	±4.0%
Reason-Rupe Public Opinion/Princeton Survey Research Associates International	October 11–15, 2012	Obama	53%	Romney	38%	15	508 LV	±5.1%
YouGov	October 4–11, 2012	Obama	58%	Romney	39%	19	1169 LV	±3.5%
CBRT/Pepperdine University/M4 Strategies	October 7–10, 2012	Obama	54%	Romney	32.9%	21.1	830 LV	±3.4%
SurveyUSA	October 7–9, 2012	Obama	53%	Romney	39%	14	539 LV	±4.3%
Field Research Corporation/UC Berkeley (Field Poll)	September 5 – 17, 2012	Obama	58%	Romney	34%	24	848 LV	±3.4%
Public Policy Institute of California	September 9 – 16, 2012	Obama	53%	Romney	39%	14	995 LV	±4.4%
YouGov	September 7 – 14, 2012	Obama	56%	Romney	39%	17	1,361 LV	Not reported
CBRT/Pepperdine University/M4 Strategies	September 9–12, 2012	Obama	55.4%	Romney	33.4%	22	802 LV	±3.5%
SurveyUSA	September 9–11, 2012	Obama	57%	Romney	35%	22	524 LV	±4.3%

=== Colorado ===
9 electoral votes
(Republican in 2004) 52%–47%
(Democratic in 2008) 54%–45%

Poll source	Date administered	Democrat	%	Republican	%	Lead margin	Sample Size	Margin of error
Reuters/Ipsos	November 3–5, 2012	Obama	48%	Romney	47%	1	774 LV	±4%
Public Policy Polling	November 3–4, 2012	Obama	52%	Romney	46%	6	1,096 LV	±3%
Keating Research/OnSight Public Affairs	November 2–4, 2012	Obama	50%	Romney	46%	4	603 LV	±4%
Reuters/Ipsos	November 2–4, 2012	Obama	48%	Romney	48%	Tied	676 LV	±4.3%
USAction/Lake Research Partners (D)	October 31–November 4, 2012	Obama	45%	Romney	44%	1	400 LV	±5%
Reuters/Ipsos	November 1–3, 2012	Obama	45%	Romney	47%	2	973 LV	±3.6%
YouGov	October 31 – November 3, 2012	Obama	48%	Romney	47%	1	752 LV	±4.1%
Reuters/Ipsos	October 31 – November 2, 2012	Obama	46%	Romney	46%	Tied	1,052 LV	±3.4%
League of Conservation Voters/Public Policy Polling (D)	October 31 – November 1, 2012	Obama	50%	Romney	46%	4	825 LV	Not reported
Reuters/Ipsos	October 30 – November 1, 2012	Obama	46%	Romney	47%	1	694 LV	±4.2%
Denver Post/SurveyUSA	October 28–31, 2012	Obama	47%	Romney	45%	2	695 LV	±3.8%
CNN/Opinion Research Corporation	October 26–31, 2012	Obama	50%	Romney	48%	2	764 LV	±3.5%
Reuters/Ipsos	October 29–31, 2012	Obama	45%	Romney	46%	1	744 LV	±4.1%
We Ask America	October 30, 2012	Obama	50%	Romney	47%	3	1,246 LV	±2.9%
Rasmussen Reports/Pulse Opinion Research	October 29, 2012	Obama	47%	Romney	50%	3	500 LV	±4.5%
Project New America/Grove Insight (D)	October 28–29, 2012	Obama	48%	Romney	45%	3	500 LV	±4.4%
American Research Group	October 25–28, 2012	Obama	47%	Romney	48%	1	600 LV	±4.0%
Public Policy Polling	October 23–25, 2012	Obama	51%	Romney	47%	4	904 LV	±3.3%
Purple Strategies	October 23–25, 2012	Obama	47%	Romney	46%	1	600 LV	±4.0%
Keating Research/OnSight Public Affairs	October 23–24, 2012	Obama	48%	Romney	45%	3	502 LV	±4.4%
NBC News/Wall Street Journal/Marist College	October 23–24, 2012	Obama	48%	Romney	48%	Tied	1,128 LV	±2.9%
Project New America/Grove Insight (D)	October 23–24, 2012	Obama	46%	Romney	43%	3	500 LV	±4.4%
Rasmussen Reports/Pulse Opinion Research	October 21, 2012	Obama	46%	Romney	50%	4	500 LV	±4.0%
Public Policy Polling	October 16–18, 2012	Obama	50%	Romney	47%	3	1000 LV	±3.1%
Project New America/Grove Insight (D)	October 15–16, 2012	Obama	47%	Romney	44%	3	500 LV	±4.4%
We Ask America	October 15, 2012	Obama	47%	Romney	48%	1	1,206 LV	±2.9%
Gravis Marketing	October 5–11, 2012	Obama	48%	Romney	46%	2	2,089 LV	±2.2%
Denver Post/SurveyUSA	October 9–10, 2012	Obama	47%	Romney	48%	1	614 LV	±4.0%
New York Times/CBS News/Quinnipiac University	October 4–9, 2012	Obama	47%	Romney	48%	1	1,254 LV	±3.0%
American Research Group	October 5–8, 2012	Obama	46%	Romney	50%	4	600 LV	±4.0%
Rasmussen Reports/Pulse Opinion Research	October 7, 2012	Obama	49%	Romney	48%	1	500 LV	±4.5%
University Of Denver/Selzer & Co.	October 4–5, 2012	Obama	47%	Romney	43%	4	604 LV	±4.0%
American Conservative Union/McLaughlin & Associates (R)	September 30 – October 2, 2012	Obama	46%	Romney	50%	4	300 LV	±5.7%
We Ask America	September 25 – 27, 2012	Obama	49%	Romney	46%	3	1,273 LV	±2.8%
Public Policy Polling	September 20–23, 2012	Obama	51%	Romney	45%	6	940 LV	±3.2%
Purple Strategies	September 15 – 19, 2012	Obama	48%	Romney	45%	3	600 LV	±4.0%
NBC News/Wall Street Journal/Marist College	September 16–18, 2012	Obama	50%	Romney	45%	5	971 LV	±3.1%
Rasmussen Reports/Pulse Opinion Research	September 17, 2012	Obama	45%	Romney	47%	2	500 LV	±4.5%
New York Times/CBS News/Quinnipiac University	September 11–17, 2012	Obama	48%	Romney	47%	1	1,497 LV	±2.5%
American Research Group	September 10–12, 2012	Obama	49%	Romney	47%	2	600 LV	±4.0%
Project New America/Keating Research/Keating Research/OnSight Public Affairs (D)	September 10–11, 2012	Obama	49%	Romney	44%	5	503 LV	±4.4%
Public Policy Polling	August 31 – September 2, 2012	Obama	49%	Romney	46%	3	1,001 LV	±3.1%

Three way race

Poll source	Date administered	Democrat	%	Republican	%	Libertarian	%	Lead margin	Sample Size	Margin of error
Public Policy Polling	September 20–23, 2012	Barack Obama	49%	Mitt Romney	43%	Gary Johnson	4%	6	740	±3.2%

=== Connecticut ===
7 electoral votes
(Democratic in 2004) 54%–44%
(Democratic in 2008) 61%–38%

Poll source	Date administered	Democrat	%	Republican	%	Lead margin	Sample Size	Margin of error
YouGov	October 31 – November 3, 2012	Obama	54%	Romney	39%	15	895 LV	±3.6%
Public Policy Polling	November 1 – 2, 2012	Obama	55%	Romney	42%	13	1,220 LV	±2.8%
Quinnipiac University	October 19–22, 2012	Obama	55%	Romney	41%	14	1,412 LV	±2.6%
Rasmussen Reports/Pulse Opinion Research	October 21, 2012	Obama	52%	Romney	45%	7	500 LV	±4.5%
SurveyUSA	October 19–21, 2012	Obama	53%	Romney	40%	13	575 LV	±4.2%
League of Conservation Voters/Public Policy Polling (D)	October 15–16, 2012	Obama	53%	Romney	44%	9	1,015 LV	±3.1%
University of Connecticut/Hartford Courant	October 11–16, 2012	Obama	51%	Romney	37%	14	574 LV	±4.0%
Siena College Research Institute	October 4–14, 2012	Obama	53%	Romney	38%	15	552 LV	±4.2%
YouGov	October 4–11, 2012	Obama	53%	Romney	39%	14	434 LV	±5.5%
Rasmussen Reports/Pulse Opinion Research	October 7, 2012	Obama	51%	Romney	45%	6	500 LV	±4.5%
Quinnipiac University	September 28 – October 2, 2012	Obama	54%	Romney	42%	12	1,696 LV	±2.4%
Public Policy Polling	September 24 – 26, 2012	Obama	54%	Romney	41%	13	801 LV	±3.5%
University of Connecticut/Hartford Courant	September 11 – 16, 2012	Obama	53%	Romney	32%	21	508 LV	±4.4%
YouGov	September 7 – 14, 2012	Obama	53%	Romney	40%	13	634 LV	Not reported

=== Delaware ===
3 electoral votes
(Democratic in 2004) 53%–46%
(Democratic in 2008) 62%–37%

No polls conducted

=== District of Columbia ===
3 electoral votes
(Democratic in 2004) 89%–9%
(Democratic in 2008) 92%–7%

Poll source	Date administered	Democrat	%	Republican	%	Lead margin	Sample Size	Margin of error
Public Policy Polling	October 12–14, 2012	Obama	88%	Romney	8%	80	1,222 LV	±2.8%

=== Florida ===
29 electoral votes
(Republican in 2004) 52%–47%
(Democratic in 2008) 51%–48%

Poll source	Date administered	Democrat	%	Republican	%	Lead margin	Sample Size	Margin of error
Gravis Marketing	November 4–5, 2012	Obama	49%	Romney	49%	Tied	1,060 LV	±3.1%
Reuters/Ipsos	November 3–5, 2012	Obama	47%	Romney	48%	1	769 LV	±4%
Florida Times-Union/Insider Advantage	November 4, 2012	Obama	47%	Romney	52%	5	437 LV	±4.6%
Public Policy Polling	November 3–4, 2012	Obama	50%	Romney	49%	1	955 LV	±3.2%
Reuters/Ipsos	November 2–4, 2012	Obama	46%	Romney	46%	Tied	743 LV	±4.1%
Angus Reid Public Opinion	November 1–3, 2012	Obama	49%	Romney	49%	Tied	525 LV	±4.3%
Reuters/Ipsos	November 1–3, 2012	Obama	47%	Romney	47%	Tied	946 LV	±3.6%
YouGov	October 31 – November 3, 2012	Obama	47%	Romney	48%	1	1,621 LV	±3%
Reuters/Ipsos	October 31 – November 2, 2012	Obama	48%	Romney	46%	2	985 LV	±3.6%
Americans United for Change/Mellman Group (D)	October 30 – November 2, 2012	Obama	47%	Romney	45%	2	800 LV	±3.4%
NBC News/Wall Street Journal/Marist College	October 30 – November 1, 2012	Obama	49%	Romney	47%	2	1,545 LV	±2.5%
Mason-Dixon Polling & Research	October 30 – November 1, 2012	Obama	45%	Romney	51%	6	800 LV	±3.5%
We Ask America	October 30, 2012	Obama	48.9%	Romney	49.8%	0.9	1,146 LV	±3%
Gravis Marketing	October 30, 2012	Obama	47%	Romney	50%	3	549 LV	±4.2%
Let Freedom Ring/Pulse Opinion Research (R)	October 29, 2012	Obama	48%	Romney	50%	2	1,000 LV	±3%
USAction/Project New America/Project New America/Grove Insight (D)	October 28–29, 2012	Obama	48%	Romney	47%	1	600 LV	±4%
Public Policy Polling	October 26–28, 2012	Obama	49%	Romney	48%	1	687 LV	±3.7%
CNN/Opinion Research Corporation	October 25–28, 2012	Obama	49%	Romney	50%	1	770 LV	±3.5%
CBS News/New York Times/Quinnipiac University	October 23–28, 2012	Obama	48%	Romney	47%	1	1,073 LV	±3%
WFLA-TV Tampa/SurveyUSA	October 25–27, 2012	Obama	47%	Romney	47%	Tied	595 LV	±4.1%
Americans United for Change/Mellman Group (D)	October 24–27, 2012	Obama	49%	Romney	47%	2	800 LV	±3.4%
Rasmussen Reports/Pulse Opinion Research	October 25, 2012	Obama	48%	Romney	50%	2	750 LV	±4.0%
Gravis Marketing	October 24, 2012	Obama	48.8%	Romney	49.7%	0.9	1,182 LV	±2.8%
Project New America/Grove Insight (D)	October 23–24, 2012	Obama	47%	Romney	45%	2	600 LV	±4.0%
Sunshine State News/Voter Survey Service	October 22–24, 2012	Obama	46%	Romney	51%	5	1,001 LV	±3.1%
Americans United for Change/Mellman Group (D)	October 18–21, 2012	Obama	47%	Romney	47%	Tied	800 LV	±3.4%
Angus Reid Public Opinion	October 18–20, 2012	Obama	46%	Romney	51%	5	502 LV	±4.5%
Rasmussen Reports/Pulse Opinion Research	October 18, 2012	Obama	46%	Romney	51%	5	750 LV	±4.0%
Fox News/Anderson Robbins/Shaw & Company	October 17–18, 2012	Obama	45%	Romney	48%	3	1,130 LV	±3.0%
WFLA-TV Tampa/SurveyUSA	October 17–18, 2012	Obama	47%	Romney	46%	1	600 LV	±4.1%
WPTV News/Scripps Treasure Coast Newspapers/Public Policy Polling	October 17–18, 2012	Obama	47%	Romney	48%	1	800 LV	±4%
Project New America/Grove Insight (D)	October 17–18, 2012	Obama	48%	Romney	45%	3	600 LV	±4.0%
CNN/Opinion Research Corporation	October 17–18, 2012	Obama	48%	Romney	49%	1	681 LV	±4.0%
Gravis Marketing	October 13–14, 2012	Obama	48%	Romney	49%	1	617 LV	±4.0%
Public Policy Polling	October 12–14, 2012	Obama	48%	Romney	49%	1	791 LV	±3.4%
Rasmussen Reports/Pulse Opinion Research	October 11, 2012	Obama	47%	Romney	51%	4	750 LV	±4.0%
American Research Group	October 8–11, 2012	Obama	46%	Romney	49%	3	600 LV	±4.0%
YouGov	October 4–11, 2012	Obama	48%	Romney	47%	1	1,244 LV	±4.0%
Mason-Dixon Polling & Research	October 8–10, 2012	Obama	44%	Romney	51%	7	800 LV	±3.5%
NBC News/Wall Street Journal/Marist College	October 7–9, 2012	Obama	48%	Romney	47%	1	988	±3.1%
University of North Florida	October 1–9, 2012	Obama	49%	Romney	45%	4	653 LV	Not reported
We Ask America	October 4, 2012	Obama	46%	Romney	49%	3	1,200 LV	±3.0%
Rasmussen Reports/Pulse Opinion Research	October 4, 2012	Obama	47%	Romney	49%	2	500 LV	±4.5%
NBC News/Wall Street Journal/Marist College	September 30 – October 1, 2012	Obama	47%	Romney	46%	1	1,191 LV	±3.3%
Gravis Marketing	September 29 – 30, 2012	Obama	49.03%	Romney	48.42%	0.61	914 LV	±3.4%
WSVN-TV Miami/Suffolk University	September 27 – 30, 2012	Obama	46%	Romney	43%	3	600 LV	±4.0%
Southern Political Report/Florida Times-Union/InsiderAdvantage	September 24, 2012	Obama	49%	Romney	46%	3	540 LV	±4.0%
CBS News/New York Times/Quinnipiac University	September 18 – 24, 2012	Obama	53%	Romney	44%	9	1,196 LV	±3.0%
Washington Post	September 19–23, 2012	Obama	51%	Romney	47%	4	769 LV	±4.5%
Public Policy Polling	September 20–23, 2012	Obama	50%	Romney	46%	4	861 LV	±3.3%
American Research Group	September 20–22, 2012	Obama	50%	Romney	45%	5	600 LV	±4%
Miami Herald/Mason-Dixon Polling & Research	September 17–19, 2012	Obama	48%	Romney	47%	1	800 LV	±3.5%
Purple Strategies	September 15 – 19, 2012	Obama	47%	Romney	48%	1	600 LV	±4.0%
Fox News/Anderson Robbins/Shaw & Company	September 16–18, 2012	Obama	49%	Romney	44%	5	829 LV	±3.0%
Capitol Correspondent/Gravis Marketing	September 15–16, 2012	Obama	47.1%	Romney	47.7%	0.6	1,728 LV	±2.5%
YouGov	September 7–14, 2012	Obama	49%	Romney	47%	2	1,415 LV	Not reported
Rasmussen Reports/Pulse Opinion Research	September 12, 2012	Obama	48%	Romney	46%	2	500 LV	±4.5%
Secure America Now/Caddell Associates/Caddell Associates/McLaughlin & Associates (R)	September 8–12, 2012	Obama	44%	Romney	48%	4	600 LV	±4.0%
NBC News/Wall Street Journal/Marist College	September 9–11, 2012	Obama	49%	Romney	44%	5	980 LV	±3.1%
Consensus Communications/OnSight Inc. (R)	September 8–11, 2012	Obama	42%	Romney	42%	Tied	606 LV	±4.0%
Associated Industries of Florida/McLaughlin & Associates (R)	September 9–10, 2012	Obama	47%	Romney	50%	3	600 LV	±4.0%
WFLA-TV Tampa/SurveyUSA	September 7–9, 2012	Obama	48%	Romney	44%	4	596 LV	±4.1%
Capitol Correspondent/Gravis Marketing	September 2, 2012	Obama	46.7%	Romney	48%	1.3	1,288 LV	±2.7%
Public Policy Polling	August 31 – September 2, 2012	Obama	48%	Romney	47%	1	1,548 LV	±2.5%

Three-way race

Poll source	Date administered	Democrat	%	Republican	%	Libertarian	%	Lead Margin	Sample Size	Margin of error
We Ask America	September 18, 2012	Barack Obama	49.1%	Mitt Romney	45.5%	Gary Johnson	1.3%	3.6%	1,230 LV	±2.82%

=== Georgia ===
16 electoral votes
(Republican in 2004) 58%–41%
(Republican in 2008) 52%–47%

Poll source	Date administered	Democrat	%	Republican	%	Lead margin	Sample Size	Margin of error
YouGov	October 31 – November 3, 2012	Obama	44%	Romney	52%	8	1,070 LV	±3.5%
20/20 Insight	October 29–31, 2012	Obama	46%	Romney	52%	6	1,316 LV	±2.7%
WXIA-TV Atlanta/SurveyUSA	October 25–28, 2012	Obama	44%	Romney	52%	8	574 LV	±4.2%
Atlanta Journal-Constitution/Abt SRBI	October 8–11, 2012	Obama	43%	Romney	51%	8	706 LV	±5.0%
Fox 5 Atlanta/Insider Advantage	September 18, 2012	Obama	35%	Romney	56%	21	483 LV	±4.5%
YouGov	September 7 – 14, 2012	Obama	44%	Romney	51%	7	1,020 LV	Not reported

=== Hawaii ===
4 electoral votes
(Democratic in 2004) 54%–45%
(Democratic in 2008) 72%–27%

Poll source	Date administered	Democrat	%	Republican	%	Lead margin	Sample Size	Margin of error
Honolulu Civil Beat/Merriman River Group	October 24–26, 2012	Obama	61%	Romney	34%	27	1,218 LV	±2.8%
Honolulu Civil Beat/Merriman River Group	September 26–28, 2012	Obama	62%	Romney	30%	32	1,648 LV	±2.4%

=== Idaho ===
4 electoral votes
(Republican in 2004) 68%–30%
(Republican in 2008) 61%–36%

Poll source	Date administered	Democrat	%	Republican	%	Lead margin	Sample Size	Margin of error
Mason-Dixon Polling & Research	October 8–10, 2012	Obama	27%	Romney	63%	36	625 LV	±4%

=== Illinois ===
20 electoral votes
(Democratic in 2004) 55%–45%
(Democratic in 2008) 62%–37%

Poll source	Date administered	Democrat	%	Republican	%	Lead margin	Sample Size	Margin of error
YouGov	October 31 – November 3, 2012	Obama	57%	Romney	38%	19	1,126 LV	±3.3%
We Ask America	October 30, 2012	Obama	57%	Romney	41%	16	1,198 LV	±2.95%
YouGov	October 4–11, 2012	Obama	58%	Romney	38%	20	850 LV	±3.9%
WGN-TV/Chicago Tribune	October 4–8, 2012	Obama	55%	Romney	36%	19	700 RV	±3.7%
YouGov	September 7–14, 2012	Obama	59%	Romney	36%	23	1,086 LV	Not reported
We Ask America	September 5, 2012	Obama	54%	Romney	37%	17	1,382 LV	±2.8%

=== Indiana ===
11 electoral votes
(Republican in 2004) 60%–39%
(Democratic in 2008) 50%–49%

Poll source	Date administered	Democrat	%	Republican	%	Lead margin	Sample Size	Margin of error
YouGov	October 31 – November 3, 2012	Obama	44%	Romney	51%	7	768 LV	±4.1%
Rasmussen Reports/Pulse Opinion Research	November 1, 2012	Obama	43%	Romney	52%	9	600 LV	±4.0%
Howey Politics/DePauw University/Bellwether Research/Bellwether; Research/Garin-Hart-Yang Research Group	October 28–30, 2012	Obama	41%	Romney	51%	10	800 LV	±3.5%
Pharos Research Group	October 26–28, 2012	Obama	42%	Romney	55%	13	753 LV	±3.5%
McLaughlin & Associates (R)	October 24–25, 2012	Obama	41%	Romney	55%	14	600 LV	±4.0%
Rasmussen Reports/Pulse Opinion Research	October 10–11, 2012	Obama	41%	Romney	54%	13	600 LV	±4.0%
Howey Politics/DePauw University/Bellwether Research/Bellwether; Research/Garin-Hart-Yang-Research Group	September 19–23, 2012	Obama	40%	Romney	52%	12	800 LV	±3.5%
YouGov	September 7–14, 2012	Obama	45%	Romney	50%	5	628 LV	±4.0%

=== Iowa ===
6 electoral votes
(Republican in 2004) 50%–49%
(Democratic in 2008) 54%–44%

Poll source	Date administered	Democrat	%	Republican	%	Lead margin	Sample Size	Margin of error
Public Policy Polling	November 3–4, 2012	Obama	50%	Romney	48%	2	1,122 LV	±2.9%
American Research Group	November 2–4, 2012	Obama	48%	Romney	49%	1	600 LV	±4%
YouGov	October 31 – November 3, 2012	Obama	48%	Romney	47%	1	1,040 LV	±3.5%
USAction/Project New America/Project New America/Grove Insight (D)	November 1–2, 2012	Obama	47%	Romney	44%	3	500 LV	±4.4%
Des Moines Register/Selzer & Co.	October 30 – November 2, 2012	Obama	47%	Romney	42%	5	800 LV	±3.5%
Gravis Marketing	November 1, 2012	Obama	49%	Romney	45%	4	594 LV	±4.0%
Americans United for Change/Mellman Group (D)	October 30 – November 1, 2012	Obama	46%	Romney	44%	2	600 LV	±4.0%
We Ask America	October 30, 2012	Obama	48.8%	Romney	47.3%	1.5	1,174 LV	±3.0%
Rasmussen Reports/Pulse Opinion Research	October 30, 2012	Obama	48%	Romney	49%	1	750 LV	±4%
Public Policy Polling	October 29–30, 2012	Obama	50%	Romney	45%	5	676 LV	±3.8%
NBC News/Wall Street Journal/Marist College	October 28–29, 2012	Obama	50%	Romney	44%	6	1,142 LV	±3%
University of Iowa	October 18–27, 2012	Obama	44.4%	Romney	45.2%	0.8	320 LV	±5.6%
Gravis Marketing	October 24, 2012	Obama	50%	Romney	46%	4	517 LV	±4.3%
Public Policy Polling	October 23–24, 2012	Obama	49%	Romney	47%	2	690 LV	±3.7%
Rasmussen Reports/Pulse Opinion Research	October 21, 2012	Obama	48%	Romney	48%	Tied	500 LV	±4.5%
Health Care for America Now/Public Policy Polling (D)	October 18–19, 2012	Obama	49%	Romney	48%	1	660 LV	±3.8%
Public Policy Polling	October 17–19, 2012	Obama	48%	Romney	49%	1	869 LV	±3.3%
NBC News/Wall Street Journal/Marist College	October 15–17, 2012	Obama	51%	Romney	43%	8	1,137 LV	±2.9%
We Ask America	October 15, 2012	Obama	48.7%	Romney	45.9%	2.8	1,499 LV	±2.6%
American Research Group	October 11–14, 2012	Obama	48%	Romney	48%	Tied	600 LV	±4.0%
Rasmussen Reports/Pulse Opinion Research	October 7, 2012	Obama	49%	Romney	47%	2	500 LV	±4.5%
We Ask America	September 25–27, 2012	Obama	47.5%	Romney	43.7%	3.8	1,064 LV	±3.1%
Public Policy Polling	September 24–26, 2012	Obama	51%	Romney	44%	7	754 LV	±3.6%
American Research Group	September 20 – 23, 2012	Obama	51%	Romney	44%	7	600 LV	±4.0%
Rasmussen Reports/Pulse Opinion Research	September 19, 2012	Obama	44%	Romney	47%	3	500 LV	±4.5%
NBC News/Wall Street Journal/Marist College	September 16–18, 2012	Obama	50%	Romney	42%	8	898 LV	±3.3%

=== Kansas ===
6 electoral votes
(Republican in 2004) 62%–37%
(Republican in 2008) 57%–42%

=== Kentucky ===
8 electoral votes
(Republican in 2004) 60%–40%
(Republican in 2008) 57%–41%

Poll source	Date administered	Democrat	%	Republican	%	Lead margin	Sample Size	Margin of error
Survey USA	September 11–13, 2012	Obama	39%	Romney	53%	14	606 LV	±4.1%

=== Louisiana ===
8 electoral votes
(Republican in 2004) 57%–42%
(Republican in 2008) 59%–40%

Poll source	Date administered	Democrat	%	Republican	%	Lead margin	Sample Size	Margin of error
Magellan Strategies	October 2 – 4, 2012	Obama	36.2%	Romney	58.8%	22.6	2,682 LV	±1.9%
Clarus Research Group	September 5 – 7, 2012	Obama	37%	Romney	53%	16	602 LV	±4.0%

=== Maine ===
4 electoral votes
(Democratic in 2004) 53%–45%
(Democratic in 2008) 58%–40%

Poll source	Date administered	Democrat	%	Republican	%	Lead margin	Sample Size	Margin of error
Maine People's Resource Center	November 1–3, 2012	Obama	53.3%	Romney	42.2%	11.1	905 LV	±3.26%
Public Policy Polling	November 1–2, 2012	Obama	55%	Romney	42%	13	1,633 LV	±2.4%
Critical Insights	October 30–31, 2012	Obama	49%	Romney	42%	7	613 LV	±4%
Pan Atlantic SMS Group	September 24–28, 2012	Obama	50.8%	Romney	36.8%	14	400 LV	±4.9%
Rasmussen Reports/Pulse Opinion Research	September 25, 2012	Obama	52%	Romney	40%	12	500 LV	±4.5%
Public Policy Polling	September 17–18, 2012	Obama	55%	Romney	39%	16	804 LV	±3.5%

=== Maryland ===
10 electoral votes
(Democratic in 2004) 56%–43%
(Democratic in 2008) 61%–38%

Poll source	Date administered	Democrat	%	Republican	%	Lead margin	Sample Size	Margin of error
YouGov	October 31 – November 3, 2012	Obama	59%	Romney	37%	22	705 LV	±4.1%
OpinionWorks	October 20 – 23, 2012	Obama	55%	Romney	36%	19	801 LV	±3.5%
Washington Post	October 11 – 15, 2012	Obama	60%	Romney	36%	24	843 LV	±4.0%
YouGov	October 4 – 11, 2012	Obama	58%	Romney	37%	21	498 LV	±5.2%
Gonzales Research & Marketing Strategies	September 17–23, 2012	Obama	55%	Romney	36%	19	813 RV	±3.5%

=== Massachusetts ===
11 electoral votes
(Democratic in 2004) 62%–37%
(Democratic in 2008) 62%–36%

Poll source	Date administered	Democrat	%	Republican	%	Lead margin	Sample Size	Margin of error
The Boston Herald/University of Massachusetts Lowell	October 31 – November 3, 2012	Obama	57%	Romney	37%	20	800 LV	±4.1%
YouGov	October 31 – November 3, 2012	Obama	57%	Romney	37%	20	811 LV	±3.6%
Public Policy Polling	November 1 – 2, 2012	Obama	57%	Romney	42%	15	1,089 LV	±3%
MassLive.com/Western New England University	October 26 – November 1, 2012	Obama	58%	Romney	40%	18	535 LV	±4%
Suffolk University	October 25 – 28, 2012	Obama	63%	Romney	31%	32	600 LV	±4.0%
Boston Globe/University of New Hampshire	October 24 – 28, 2012	Obama	52%	Romney	38%	14	583 LV	±4.1%
Rasmussen Reports/Pulse Opinion Research	October 25, 2012	Obama	59%	Romney	40%	19	500 LV	±4.5%
WBUR/MassINC Polling Group	October 21 – 22, 2012	Obama	56%	Romney	36%	20	516 LV	±4.4%
Kimball Political Consulting	October 18 – 21, 2012	Obama	55%	Romney	39%	16	761 LV	±3.48%
League of Conservation Voters/Public Policy Polling (D)	October 15 – 16, 2012	Obama	57%	Romney	39%	18	709 LV	±3.7%
Public Policy Polling	October 9 – 11, 2012	Obama	55%	Romney	41%	14	1,051 LV	±3.0%
YouGov	October 4–11, 2012	Obama	55%	Romney	36%	19	669 LV	±4.9%
Rasmussen Reports/Pulse Opinion Research	October 10, 2012	Obama	57%	Romney	42%	15	500 LV	±4.5%
University of Massachusetts Amherst/YouGov	October 2 – 8, 2012	Obama	55%	Romney	34%	21	437 LV	±5.4%
WBUR/MassINC Polling Group	October 5 – 7, 2012	Obama	52%	Romney	36%	16	501 LV	±4.4%
Western New England University	September 28 – October 4, 2012	Obama	63%	Romney	33%	30	516 RV	±4.3%
WBUR/MassINC Polling Group	September 26 – 28, 2012	Obama	60%	Romney	32%	28	504 LV	±4.4%
Mass Insight Global Partnerships/Opinion Dynamics Corporation	September 25–30, 2012	Obama	60%	Romney	34%	26	405 RV	±4.6%
Boston Globe/University of New Hampshire	September 21 – 27, 2012	Obama	57%	Romney	30%	27	502 LV	±4.4%
Rasmussen Reports/Pulse Opinion Research	September 24, 2012	Obama	55%	Romney	40%	15	500 LV	±4.5%
The Boston Herald/University of Massachusetts Lowell	September 13 – 17, 2012	Obama	60%	Romney	36%	24	497 LV	±5.5%
Public Policy Polling	September 13 – 16, 2012	Obama	57%	Romney	39%	18	876 LV	±3.3%
Suffolk University	September 13 – 16, 2012	Obama	64%	Romney	31%	33	600 LV	±4.0%
YouGov	September 7–14, 2012	Obama	55%	Romney	39%	16	825 LV	Not reported
MassLive.com/Western New England University	September 6 – 13, 2012	Obama	60%	Romney	38%	22	444 LV	±4.6%
Kimball Political Consulting	September 7 – 9, 2012	Obama	56%	Romney	40%	16	756 LV	±3.5%

=== Michigan ===
16 electoral votes
(Democratic in 2004) 51%–48%
(Democratic in 2008) 57%–41%

Poll source	Date administered	Democrat	%	Republican	%	Lead margin	Sample Size	Margin of error
Mitchell Research & Communications	November 4, 2012	Obama	51%	Romney	46%	5	1,305 LV	±2.7%
Angus Reid Public Opinion	November 1 – 3, 2012	Obama	52%	Romney	47%	5	502 LV	±4.4%
Public Policy Polling	November 1 – 3, 2012	Obama	52%	Romney	46%	6	700 LV	±3.7%
YouGov	October 31 – November 3, 2012	Obama	51%	Romney	44%	7	1,091 LV	±3.3%
Fox 2 News Detroit/Foster McCollum White & Associates/Baydoun Consulting	November 2, 2012	Obama	46.24%	Romney	46.86%	0.62	1,913 LV	±2.24%
Rasmussen Reports	November 1, 2012	Obama	52%	Romney	47%	5	750 LV	±4%
USAction/Project New America/Project New America/Grove Insight (D)	October 31 – November 1, 2012	Obama	48%	Romney	41%	7	500 LV	±4.4%
League of Conservation Voters/Public Policy Polling (D)	October 31 – November 1, 2012	Obama	52%	Romney	46%	6	500 LV	±4.4%
Health Care for America Now/Public Policy Polling (D)	October 30–31, 2012	Obama	53%	Romney	45%	8	500 LV	±4.4%
Detroit News/Glengariff Group	October 27–29, 2012	Obama	47.7%	Romney	45%	2.7	600 LV	±4%
EPIC-MRA	October 26–29, 2012	Obama	48%	Romney	42%	6	600 LV	±4%
Fox 2 News Detroit/Foster McCollum White & Associates/Baydoun Consulting	October 22–23, 2012	Obama	46.92%	Romney	46.56%	0.36	1,122 LV	±2.9%
Angus Reid Public Opinion	October 18–20, 2012	Obama	52%	Romney	43%	9	551 LV	±4.2%
EPIC-MRA	October 17, 2012	Obama	52%	Romney	46%	6	800 LV	±3.5%
Rasmussen Reports/Pulse Opinion Research	October 11, 2012	Obama	52%	Romney	45%	7	500 LV	±4.5%
YouGov	October 4–11, 2012	Obama	52%	Romney	42%	10	895 LV	±3.9%
Lambert, Edwards & Associates/Denno Research	October 9–10, 2012	Obama	44.2%	Romney	40.5%	3.7	600 LV	±4.0%
Detroit News/Glengariff Group	October 6 – 8, 2012	Obama	49%	Romney	42%	7	600 LV	±4.0%
Capitol CorrespondentGravis Marketing	October 5 – 8, 2012	Obama	46%	Romney	44%	2	1,122 LV	±3.2%
EPIC-MRA	October 4 – 6, 2012	Obama	48%	Romney	45%	3	600 LV	±4.0%
Fox 2 News Detroit/Foster McCollum White/Baydoun Consulting	October 5, 2012	Obama	49.3%	Romney	45.85%	3.45	1,122 LV	±2.93%
We Ask America	September 25 – 27, 2012	Obama	52%	Romney	39.9%	12.1	1,064 LV	±3.1%
Capitol Correspondent/Gravis Marketing	September 21 – 22, 2012	Obama	50%	Romney	46.2%	3.8	804 LV	±3.3%
Rasmussen Reports/Pulse Opinion Research	September 20, 2012	Obama	54%	Romney	42%	12	500 LV	±4.5%
National Resource Defense Council/Public Policy Polling (D)	September 17–19, 2012	Obama	51%	Romney	42%	9	1021 LV	±3.1%
CNN/Opinion Research Corporation	September 14–18, 2012	Obama	52%	Romney	44%	8	754 LV	±3.5%
Detroit News/Glengariff Group	September 15–17, 2012	Obama	52%	Romney	38%	14	600 LV	±4%
Marketing Resource Group	September 10–14, 2012	Obama	47.5%	Romney	42.3%	5.2	600 LV	±4.0%
YouGov	September 7–14, 2012	Obama	51%	Romney	42%	9	1114 LV	Not reported
Foster McCollum White/Baydoun & Associates	September 12, 2012	Obama	45.49%	Romney	43.65%	1.84	1,156 LV	±2.88%
EPIC-MRA	September 8–11, 2012	Obama	47%	Romney	37%	10	600 LV	±4.0%
Public Policy Polling	August 31 – September 2, 2012	Obama	51%	Romney	44%	7	815 LV	±3.4%

=== Minnesota ===
10 electoral votes
(Democratic in 2004) 51%–48%
(Democratic in 2008) 54%–44%

Poll source	Date administered	Democrat	%	Republican	%	Lead margin	Sample Size	Margin of error
Public Policy Polling	November 2–3, 2012	Obama	53%	Romney	45%	8	1,164 LV	±2.9%
KSTP-TV Minneapolis/SurveyUSA	November 1–3, 2012	Obama	52%	Romney	41%	11	556 LV	±4.2%
YouGov	October 31 – November 3, 2012	Obama	50%	Romney	43%	7	790 LV	±3.8%
League of Conservation Voters/Public Policy Polling (D)	October 31 – November 1, 2012	Obama	53%	Romney	44%	9	772 LV	Not reported
American Future Fund/NMB Research (R)	October 29–31, 2012	Obama	45%	Romney	46%	1	500 LV	±4.38%
KSTP-TV Minneapolis/Survey USA	October 26–28, 2012	Obama	50%	Romney	43%	7	574 LV	±4.2%
Star Tribune Minnesota/Mason-Dixon Polling & Research	October 23–25, 2012	Obama	47%	Romney	44%	3	800 LV	±3.5%
St. Cloud State University	October 15–21, 2012	Obama	53%	Romney	45%	8	601 LV	±5%
Rasmussen Reports/Pulse Opinion Research	October 21, 2012	Obama	51%	Romney	46%	5	500 LV	±4.5%
KSTP-TV Minneapolis/SurveyUSA	October 12 – 14, 2012	Obama	50%	Romney	40%	10	550 LV	±4.3%
YouGov	October 4 – 11, 2012	Obama	52%	Romney	44%	8	683 LV	±4.2%
American Future Fund/NMB Research (R)	October 7 – 8, 2012	Obama	47%	Romney	43%	4	500 LV	±4.38%
Public Policy Polling	October 5–8, 2012	Obama	53%	Romney	43%	10	937 LV	±3.2%
Star Tribune Minnesota/Mason-Dixon Polling & Research	September 10–11, 2012	Obama	51%	Romney	44%	7	824 LV	±3.4%
KSTP-TV Minneapolis/SurveyUSA	September 6–9, 2012	Obama	50%	Romney	40%	10	551 LV	±4.3%

=== Mississippi ===
6 electoral votes
(Republican in 2004) 59%–40%
(Republican in 2008) 56%–43%

=== Missouri ===
10 electoral votes
(Republican in 2004) 53%–46%
(Republican in 2008) 49%–49%

Poll source	Date administered	Democrat	%	Republican	%	Lead margin	Sample Size	Margin of error
Public Policy Polling	November 2–3, 2012	Obama	45%	Romney	53%	8	835 LV	±3.4%
YouGov	October 31 – November 3, 2012	Obama	42%	Romney	53%	11	779 LV	±3.8%
KSDK-TV St. Louis/KSHB-TV Kansas City/KSPR-TV Springfield/KYTV-TV Springfield/Survey USA	October 28 – November 3, 2012	Obama	43%	Romney	50%	7	589 LV	±4.1%
We Ask America	October 30, 2012	Obama	42.2%	Romney	53.8%	11.6	1,217 LV	±2.9%
St. Louis Post-Dispatch/Mason-Dixon Polling & Research	October 23 – 25, 2012	Obama	41%	Romney	54%	13	624 LV	±4%
Public Policy Polling	October 19 – 21, 2012	Obama	46%	Romney	52%	6	582 LV	±4.1%
Rasmussen Reports/Pulse Opinion Research	October 12 – 13, 2012	Obama	43%	Romney	54%	11	500 LV	±4.5%
Wenzel Strategies	October 12 – 13, 2012	Obama	41.1%	Romney	54.9%	13.8	1,000 LV	±3.07%
Public Policy Polling	October 1 – 3, 2012	Obama	45%	Romney	51%	6	700 LV	±3.7%
Rasmussen Reports/Pulse Opinion Research	October 2, 2012	Obama	46%	Romney	49%	3	500 LV	±4.5%
We Ask America	September 25 – 27, 2012	Obama	44.5%	Romney	47.7%	3.2	1,145 LV	±2.9%
Missouri Scout/Chilenski Strategies	September 20, 2012	Obama	44%	Romney	50%	6	817 LV	±3.4%
YouGov	September 7 – 14, 2012	Obama	43%	Romney	50%	7	734 LV	Not reported
Rasmussen Reports/Pulse Opinion Research	September 11, 2012	Obama	45%	Romney	48%	3	500 LV	±4.5%

=== Montana ===
3 electoral votes
(Republican in 2004) 59%–39%
(Republican in 2008) 49%–47%

Poll source	Date administered	Democrat	%	Republican	%	Lead margin	Sample Size	Margin of error
Public Policy Polling	November 2–3, 2012	Obama	45%	Romney	52%	7	836 LV	±3.4%
Billings Gazette/Mason-Dixon Polling & Research	October 29–31, 2012	Obama	43%	Romney	53%	10	625 LV	±4%
Rasmussen Reports/Pulse Opinion Research	October 29, 2012	Obama	43%	Romney	53%	10	500 LV	±4.5%
Public Policy Polling	October 15 – 16, 2012	Obama	43%	Romney	53%	10	806 LV	±3.5%
Rasmussen Reports/Pulse Opinion Research	October 14, 2012	Obama	45%	Romney	53%	8	500 LV	±4.5%
Public Policy Polling	October 8 – 10, 2012	Obama	41%	Romney	52%	11	737 LV	±3.6%
Montana Jobs, Energy, and Technology/Mellman Group (D)	September 23 – 26, 2012	Obama	44%	Romney	48%	4	600 LV	±4%
Public Policy Polling	September 10–11, 2012	Obama	45%	Romney	50%	5	656 LV	±3.8%

Three way race

Poll source	Date administered	Democrat	%	Republican	%	Libertarian	%	Lead margin	Sample Size	Margin of error
Lee Newspapers/Mason-Dixon Research & Polling	September 19, 2012	Barack Obama	42%	Mitt Romney	51%	Gary Johnson	2%	9	625 RV	±4%

=== Nebraska ===
5 electoral votes
(Republican in 2004) 66%–33%
(Republican in 2008) 57%–42%

Poll source	Date administered	Democrat	%	Republican	%	Lead margin	Sample Size	Margin of error
We Ask America	November 1, 2012	Obama	41%	Romney	54%	13	1,178 LV	±2.95%
Wiese Research Associates	October 23 – 25, 2012	Obama	38%	Romney	52%	14	800 LV	±3.5%
Wiese Research Associates	September 17 – 20, 2012	Obama	40%	Romney	51%	11	800 LV	±3.5%

2nd Congressional District

Poll source	Date administered	Democrat	%	Republican	%	Lead margin	Sample Size	Margin of error
Wiese Research Associates	October 23 – 25, 2012	Obama	44%	Romney	49%	5	679 LV	±3.8%
Wiese Research Associates	September 17 – 20, 2012	Obama	44%	Romney	44%	Tied	Not reported	Not reported

=== Nevada ===
6 electoral votes
(Republican in 2004) 51%–48%
(Democratic in 2008) 55%–43%

Poll source	Date administered	Democrat	%	Republican	%	Lead margin	Sample Size	Margin of error
Public Policy Polling	November 3–4, 2012	Obama	51%	Romney	47%	4	750 LV	±3.6%
YouGov	October 31 – November 3, 2012	Obama	49%	Romney	45%	4	732 LV	±4.1%
Americans United for Change/Mellman Group (D)	October 29–31, 2012	Obama	50%	Romney	44%	6	600 LV	±4%
Las Vegas Review-Journal/SurveyUSA	October 23–29, 2012	Obama	50%	Romney	46%	4	1,212 LV	±2.9%
USAction/Project New America/Project New America/Grove Insight (D)	October 27–28, 2012	Obama	49%	Romney	43%	6	500 LV	±4.4%
Gravis Marketing	October 24, 2012	Obama	50%	Romney	49%	1	955 LV	±3.2%
NBC News/Wall Street Journal/Marist College	October 23–24, 2012	Obama	50%	Romney	47%	3	1,042 LV	±3%
Public Policy Polling	October 22–24, 2012	Obama	51%	Romney	47%	4	636 LV	±3.9%
Rasmussen Reports/Pulse Opinion Research	October 23, 2012	Obama	50%	Romney	48%	2	500 LV	±4.5%
American Research Group	October 19 – 22, 2012	Obama	49%	Romney	47%	2	600 LV	±4.0%
Americans United for Change/Mellman Group (D)	October 15–17, 2012	Obama	51%	Romney	43%	8	600 LV	±4.0%
Project New America/Grove Insight (D)	October 15–16, 2012	Obama	50%	Romney	43%	7	500 LV	±4.4%
Las Vegas Review-Journal/SurveyUSA	October 11–15, 2012	Obama	48%	Romney	45%	3	806 LV	±3.5%
Rasmussen Reports/Pulse Opinion Research	October 15, 2012	Obama	50%	Romney	47%	3	500 LV	±4.5%
YouGov	October 4 – 11, 2012	Obama	50%	Romney	45%	5	358 LV	±6.7%
Public Policy Polling	October 8–10, 2012	Obama	51%	Romney	47%	4	594 LV	±4%
KSNV-Nevada/Suffolk University	October 6–9, 2012	Obama	47%	Romney	45%	2	500 LV	±4.4%
Rasmussen Reports/Pulse Opinion Research	October 8, 2012	Obama	47%	Romney	47%	Tied	500 LV	±4.5%
Las Vegas Review-Journal/SurveyUSA	October 3–8, 2012	Obama	47%	Romney	46%	1	1,222 LV	±2.9%
Gravis Marketing	October 3, 2012	Obama	49%	Romney	48%	1	1,006 LV	±3.1%
NBC News/Wall Street Journal/Marist College	September 23 – 25, 2012	Obama	49%	Romney	47%	2	984 LV	±3.1%
American Research Group	September 20 – 23, 2012	Obama	51%	Romney	44%	7	600 LV	±4.0%
Retail Association of Nevada/Public Opinion Strategies (R)	September 19 – 20, 2012	Obama	46%	Romney	46%	Tied	500 LV	±4.4%
League of Conservation Voters/Public Policy Polling (D)	September 18 – 20, 2012	Obama	52%	Romney	43%	9	501 LV	±4.4%
Rasmussen Reports/Pulse Opinion Research	September 18, 2012	Obama	47%	Romney	45%	2	500 LV	±4.5%
CNN/Opinion Research Corporation	September 14–18, 2012	Obama	49%	Romney	46%	3	741 LV	±3.5%

Three way race

Poll source	Date administered	Democrat	%	Republican	%	Libertarian	%	Lead margin	Sample Size	Margin of error
WeAskAmerica	September 25–27, 2012	Barack Obama	52.5%	Mitt Romney	42%	Gary Johnson	2.3%	10.5	1,152 LV	±3.1%

=== New Hampshire ===
4 electoral votes
(Democratic in 2004) 50%–49%
(Democratic in 2008) 54%–45%

Poll source	Date administered	Democrat	%	Republican	%	Lead margin	Sample Size	Margin of error
Rasmussen Reports/Pulse Opinion Research	November 4, 2012	Obama	50%	Romney	48%	2	750 LV	±4%
New England College	November 3–4, 2012	Obama	50%	Romney	46%	4	687 LV	±3.7%
Public Policy Polling	November 3–4, 2012	Obama	50%	Romney	48%	2	1,550 LV	±2.5%
American Research Group	November 2–4, 2012	Obama	49%	Romney	49%	Tied	600 LV	±4%
University of New Hampshire	November 1–4, 2012	Obama	51%	Romney	48%	3	789 LV	±3.5%
YouGov	October 31 – November 3, 2012	Obama	47%	Romney	43%	4	690 LV	±4.1%
WMUR/University of New Hampshire	October 31 – November 2, 2012	Obama	48%	Romney	48%	Tied	502 LV	±4.4%
Gravis Marketing	November 1, 2012	Obama	50%	Romney	49%	1	497 LV	±4.3%
New England College	October 29–31, 2012	Obama	50%	Romney	44%	6	1,017 LV	±3.7%
NBC News/Wall Street Journal/Marist College	October 28–29, 2012	Obama	49%	Romney	47%	2	1,013 LV	±3.1%
Public Policy Polling	October 26 – 28, 2012	Obama	49%	Romney	47%	2	874 LV	±3.3%
USAction/Lake Research Partners (D)	October 24 – 28, 2012	Obama	47%	Romney	42%	5	400 LV	±5%
USAction/Project New America/Project New America/Grove Insight (D)	October 24 – 25, 2012	Obama	47%	Romney	44%	3	500 LV	±4.4%
New England College	October 23 – 25, 2012	Obama	49%	Romney	46%	3	571 LV	±4.1%
Rasmussen Reports/Pulse Opinion Research	October 23, 2012	Obama	48%	Romney	50%	2	500 LV	±4.5%
American Research Group	October 19 – 22, 2012	Obama	47%	Romney	49%	2	600 LV	±4.0%
USAction/Lake Research Partners (D)	October 18 – 22, 2012	Obama	48%	Romney	45%	3	400 LV	±4.9%
WMUR/University of New Hampshire	October 17 – 21, 2012	Obama	51%	Romney	42%	9	773 LV	±3.5%
Public Policy Polling	October 17 – 19, 2012	Obama	48%	Romney	49%	1	1,036 LV	±3.0%
Rasmussen Reports/Pulse Opinion Research	October 15, 2012	Obama	50%	Romney	49%	1	500 LV	±4.5%
7 News/Suffolk University	October 12 – 14, 2012	Obama	47%	Romney	47%	Tied	500 LV	±4.4%
American Research Group	October 9 – 11, 2012	Obama	46%	Romney	50%	4	600 LV	±4.0%
Rasmussen Reports/Pulse Opinion Research	October 9, 2012	Obama	48%	Romney	48%	Tied	500 LV	±4.5%
WMUR/University of New Hampshire	September 30 – October 6, 2012	Obama	50%	Romney	44%	6	559 LV	±4.1%
WMUR/University of New Hampshire	September 27 – 30, 2012	Obama	54%	Romney	39%	15	600 LV	±4.0%
American Research Group	September 25 – 27, 2012	Obama	50%	Romney	45%	5	600 LV	±4.0%
Progressive Change Campaign Committee/Public Policy Polling (D)	September 24–25, 2012	Obama	51%	Romney	44%	7	862 LV	±3.3%
NBC News/Wall Street Journal/Marist College	September 23 – 25, 2012	Obama	51%	Romney	44%	7	1,012	±3.1%
New Hampshire Democratic Party/Greenberg Quinlan Rosner (D)	September 15 – 19, 2012	Obama	52%	Romney	45%	7	600 LV	±4.9%
Rasmussen Reports/Pulse Opinion Research	September 18, 2012	Obama	45%	Romney	48%	3	500 LV	±4.5%
American Research Group	September 15–17, 2012	Obama	48%	Romney	47%	1	463 LV	Not reported
YouGov	September 7–14, 2012	Obama	48%	Romney	42%	6	340 LV	Not reported
WMUR/University of New Hampshire	September 4–10, 2012	Obama	45%	Romney	40%	5	592 LV	±4.0%

=== New Jersey ===
14 electoral votes
(Democratic in 2004) 52%–46%
(Democratic in 2008) 57%–42%

Poll source	Date administered	Democrat	%	Republican	%	Lead margin	Sample Size	Margin of error
YouGov	October 31 – November 3, 2012	Obama	53%	Romney	41%	12	987 LV	±3.4%
Philadelphia Inquirer/Global Strategy Group/National Research	October 23 – 25, 2012	Obama	51%	Romney	41%	10	601 LV	±4.0%
Quinnipiac University	October 10 – 14, 2012	Obama	51%	Romney	43%	8	1,319 LV	±2.7%
Philadelphia Inquirer/Global Strategy Group/National Research	October 4 – 8, 2012	Obama	51%	Romney	40%	11	604 LV	±4.0%
Rutgers University	September 27 – 30, 2012	Obama	56%	Romney	39%	17	645 LV	±3.8%
Monmouth University	September 19 – 23, 2012	Obama	52%	Romney	37%	15	613 LV	±4.0%
YouGov	September 7 – 14, 2012	Obama	52%	Romney	40%	12	1,040 LV	Not reported
Philadelphia Inquirer/Global Strategy Group/National Research	September 9–12, 2012	Obama	51%	Romney	37%	14	600 LV	±4.0%
Quinnipiac University	August 27 – September 2, 2012	Obama	51%	Romney	44%	7	1,471 LV	±2.6%

=== New Mexico ===
5 electoral votes
(Republican in 2004) 50%–49%
(Democratic in 2008) 57%–42%

Poll source	Date administered	Democrat	%	Republican	%	Lead margin	Sample Size	Margin of error
YouGov	October 31 – November 3, 2012	Obama	49%	Romney	43%	6	650 LV	Not reported
Public Opinion Strategies (R)	October 30–31, 2012	Obama	49%	Romney	41%	8	500 LV	±4.38%
Albuquerque Journal/Research & Polling Inc.	October 23–25, 2012	Obama	50%	Romney	41%	9	662 LV	±3.8%
Public Policy Polling	October 23–24, 2012	Obama	53%	Romney	44%	9	727 LV	Not reported
Public Opinion Strategies (R)	October 21–22, 2012	Obama	47%	Romney	42%	5	500 LV	±4.38%
Albuquerque Journal/Research & Polling Inc.	October 9–10, 2012	Obama	49%	Romney	39%	10	658 LV	±3.8%
Rasmussen Reports/Pulse Opinion Research	October 8, 2012	Obama	54%	Romney	43%	11	500 LV	±4.5%
League of Conservation Voters/Public Policy Polling (D)	October 2–3, 2012	Obama	52%	Romney	43%	9	778 LV	Not reported
Rasmussen Reports/Pulse Opinion Research	September 27, 2012	Obama	51%	Romney	40%	11	500 LV	±4.5%
Public Opinion Strategies (R)	September 25–27, 2012	Obama	47%	Romney	40%	7	500 LV	±4.38%
NRDC Action Fund/Public Policy Polling (D)	September 17 – 20, 2012	Obama	52%	Romney	43%	9	3,111 LV	±1.8%
YouGov	September 7–14, 2012	Obama	51%	Romney	43%	8	293 LV	Not reported
League of Conservation Voters/Public Policy Polling (D)	September 7–9, 2012	Obama	53%	Romney	42%	11	1,122 LV	±2.9%
Albuquerque Journal/Research & Polling Inc.	September 3–6, 2012	Obama	45%	Romney	40%	5	667 LV	±3.8%

Three way race

Poll source	Date administered	Democrat	%	Republican	%	Libertarian	%	Lead margin	Sample Size	Margin of error
Public Opinion Strategies (R)	October 30–31, 2012	Barack Obama	49%	Mitt Romney	41%	Gary Johnson	6%	8	500 LV	±4.38%
Albuquerque Journal/Research & Polling Inc.	October 23–25, 2012	Barack Obama	50%	Mitt Romney	41%	Gary Johnson	5%	9	662 LV	±3.8%
Albuquerque Journal/Research & Polling Inc.	October 9–11, 2012	Barack Obama	49%	Mitt Romney	39%	Gary Johnson	6%	10	658 LV	±3.8%
We Ask America	September 25–27, 2012	Barack Obama	50.9%	Mitt Romney	40.6%	Gary Johnson	3.9%	10.3	1,258 LV	±2.58%
Albuquerque Journal/Research & Polling Inc.	September 3–6, 2012	Barack Obama	45%	Mitt Romney	40%	Gary Johnson	7%	5	667 LV	±3.8%

=== New York ===
29 electoral votes
(Democratic in 2004) 58%–40%
(Democratic in 2008) 63%–36%

Poll source	Date administered	Democrat	%	Republican	%	Lead margin	Sample Size	Margin of error
YouGov	October 31 – November 3, 2012	Obama	59%	Romney	36%	23	1,430 LV	±2.8%
WABC-TV New York/SurveyUSA	October 23 – 25, 2012	Obama	62%	Romney	33%	29	554 LV	±4.1%
Siena College	October 22 – 24, 2012	Obama	59%	Romney	35%	24	750 LV	±3.6%
Marist College	October 18 – 21, 2012	Obama	61%	Romney	35%	26	565 LV	±4.1%
YouGov	October 4 – 11, 2012	Obama	59%	Romney	35%	24	1,142 LV	±3.2%
Quinnipiac University	September 4–9, 2012	Obama	62%	Romney	34%	28	1,486 LV	±2.5%

=== North Carolina ===
15 electoral votes
(Republican in 2004) 56%–44%
(Democratic in 2008) 50%–49%

Poll source	Date administered	Democrat	%	Republican	%	Lead margin	Sample Size	Margin of error
Gravis Marketing	November 4, 2012	Obama	46%	Romney	50%	4	1,130 LV	±2.9%
Public Policy Polling	November 3–4, 2012	Obama	49%	Romney	49%	Tied	926 LV	±3.2%
YouGov	October 31 – November 3, 2012	Obama	47%	Romney	49%	2	1,500 LV	±2.8%
Public Policy Polling	October 29 – 31, 2012	Obama	49%	Romney	49%	Tied	730 LV	±3.6%
High Point University	October 22–30, 2012	Obama	45%	Romney	46%	1	403 LV	±5%
WRAL-TV Raleigh/SurveyUSA	October 26–29, 2012	Obama	45%	Romney	50%	5	682 LV	±3.8%
Elon University	October 21 – 26, 2012	Obama	45%	Romney	45%	Tied	1,238 LV	±2.79%
Rasmussen Reports/Pulse Opinion Research	October 25, 2012	Obama	46%	Romney	52%	6	500 LV	±4.5%
Public Policy Polling	October 23 – 25, 2012	Obama	48%	Romney	48%	Tied	880 LV	±3.3%
Gravis Marketing	October 24, 2012	Obama	45%	Romney	53%	8	1,723 LV	±2.4%
Project New America/Grove Insight (D)	October 23 – 24, 2012	Obama	47%	Romney	44%	3	500 LV	±4.4%
Civitas Institute/National Research (R)	October 20–21, 2012	Obama	47%	Romney	48%	1	600 LV	±4%
Project New America/Grove Insight (D)	October 17 – 18, 2012	Obama	47%	Romney	44%	3	500 LV	±4.4%
Rasmussen Reports/Pulse Opinion Research	October 17, 2012	Obama	46%	Romney	52%	6	500 LV	±4.5%
Public Policy Polling	October 12 – 14, 2012	Obama	47%	Romney	49%	2	1,084 LV	±3.0%
North Carolina Republican Party/Tel Opinion Research (R)	October 12–13, 2012	Obama	45%	Romney	49%	4	600 LV	±4.0%
YouGov	October 4–11, 2012	Obama	48%	Romney	49%	1	810 LV	±3.9%
University of North Carolina/High Point University	September 29 – October 10, 2012	Obama	46%	Romney	45%	1	605 RV	±4.0%
Rasmussen Reports/Pulse Opinion Research	October 9, 2012	Obama	48%	Romney	51%	3	500 LV	±4.5%
Gravis Marketing	October 6–8, 2012	Obama	41.2%	Romney	49.9%	8.7	1,325 LV	±2.9%
Rasmussen Reports/Pulse Opinion Research	October 2, 2012	Obama	47%	Romney	51%	4	500 LV	±4.5%
Survey USA	September 29 – October 1, 2012	Obama	49%	Romney	47%	2	573 LV	±4.2%
American Research Group	September 28 – 30, 2012	Obama	46%	Romney	50%	4	600 LV	±4.0%
Public Policy Polling	September 27 – 30, 2012	Obama	48%	Romney	48%	Tied	981 LV	±3.1%
NBC News/Wall Street Journal/Marist College	September 23–25, 2012	Obama	48%	Romney	46%	2	1,035 LV	±3.0%
Civitas Institute/National Research (R)	September 18–19, 2012	Obama	49%	Romney	45%	4	600 RV	±4%
Purple Strategies	September 15–19, 2012	Obama	48%	Romney	46%	2	600 LV	±4%
FOX 8/High Point University	September 8–13, 15–18, 2012	Obama	46%	Romney	43%	3	448 RV	±4.7%
YouGov	September 7–14, 2012	Obama	46%	Romney	48%	2	1,060 LV	Not reported
Rasmussen Reports/Pulse Opinion Research	September 13, 2012	Obama	45%	Romney	51%	6	500 LV	±4.5%
Public Policy Polling	September 7–9, 2012	Obama	49%	Romney	48%	1	1,087 LV	±3.0%
Civitas Institute/SurveyUSA	September 4–6, 2012	Obama	43%	Romney	53%	10	500 RV	±4.5%
Public Policy Polling	August 31 – Sept 2, 2012	Obama	48%	Romney	48%	Tied	1,012 LV	±3.1%

=== North Dakota ===
3 electoral votes
(Republican in 2004) 63%–36%
(Republican in 2008) 53%–45%

Poll source	Date administered	Democrat	%	Republican	%	Lead margin	Sample Size	Margin of error
Mason-Dixon Polling & Research	October 26 – 28, 2012	Obama	40%	Romney	54%	14	625 LV	±4%
Rasmussen Reports/Pulse Opinion Research	October 17 – 18, 2012	Obama	40%	Romney	54%	14	600 LV	±4.0%
Forum Communications/Essman Research	October 12 – 15, 2012	Obama	32%	Romney	57%	25	500 LV	±4.4%
Mason-Dixon Polling & Research	October 3 – 5, 2012	Obama	40%	Romney	54%	14	625 LV	±4.0%
North Dakota Democratic-NPL State Party/DFM Research (D)	September 24 – 27, 2012	Obama	39%	Romney	51%	12	600 LV	±4.0%

=== Ohio ===
18 electoral votes
(Republican in 2004) 51%–49%
(Democratic in 2008) 52%–47%

Poll source	Date administered	Democrat	%	Republican	%	Lead margin	Sample Size	Margin of error
Gravis Marketing	November 4–5, 2012	Obama	49%	Romney	48%	1	1,316 LV	±2.7%
Reuters/Ipsos	November 3–5, 2012	Obama	50%	Romney	46%	4	680 LV	±4.3%
Rasmussen Reports/Pulse Opinion Research	November 4, 2012	Obama	49%	Romney	49%	Tied	750 LV	±4.0%
Public Policy Polling	November 3–4, 2012	Obama	52%	Romney	47%	5	1,000 LV	±3.1%
Angus Reid Public Opinion	November 2–4, 2012	Obama	51%	Romney	48%	3	572 LV	±4.1%
Reuters/Ipsos	November 2–4, 2012	Obama	48%	Romney	44%	4	712 LV	±4.2%
WCMH-TV Columbus/SurveyUSA	November 1–4, 2012	Obama	49%	Romney	44%	5	803 LV	±3.5%
University of Cincinnati	October 31 – November 4, 2012	Obama	50%	Romney	49%	1	901 LV	±3.3%
Reuters/Ipsos	November 1–3, 2012	Obama	46%	Romney	45%	1	1,031 LV	±3.5%
YouGov	October 31 – November 3, 2012	Obama	49%	Romney	46%	3	1,620 LV	±3%
Columbus Dispatch	October 24 – November 3, 2012	Obama	50%	Romney	48%	2	1,501 LV	±2.2%
USAction/Project New America/Project New America/Grove Insight (D)	November 1–2, 2012	Obama	49%	Romney	45%	4	500 LV	±4.4%
Reuters/Ipsos	October 31 – November 2, 2012	Obama	47%	Romney	45%	2	1,012 LV	±3.5%
Rasmussen Reports/Pulse Opinion Research	November 1, 2012	Obama	49%	Romney	49%	Tied	750 LV	±4%
NBC News/Wall Street Journal/Marist College	October 30 – November 1, 2012	Obama	51%	Romney	45%	6	971 LV	±3.1%
We Ask America	October 30 – November 1, 2012	Obama	50.2%	Romney	45.8%	4	1,649 LV	±2.6%
CNN/Opinion Research Corporation	October 30 – November 1, 2012	Obama	50%	Romney	47%	3	796 LV	±3.5%
Citizens United/Wenzel Strategies (R)	October 30–31, 2012	Obama	46%	Romney	49%	3	1,281 LV	±2.7%
Health Care for America Now/Public Policy Polling (D)	October 29 – 30, 2012	Obama	50%	Romney	45%	5	600 LV	±4.0%
University of Cincinnati	October 25 – 30, 2012	Obama	48%	Romney	46%	2	1,141 LV	±2.9%
Let Freedom Ring/Pulse Opinion Research (R)	October 29, 2012	Obama	48%	Romney	46%	2	1,000 LV	±3%
USAction/Project New America/Project New America/Grove Insight (D)	October 28 – 29, 2012	Obama	48%	Romney	45%	3	500 LV	±4.4%
WCMH-TV Columbus/SurveyUSA	October 26 – 29, 2012	Obama	48%	Romney	45%	3	603 LV	±4.1%
Rasmussen Reports/Pulse Opinion Research	October 28, 2012	Obama	48%	Romney	50%	2	750 LV	±4%
Pharos Research	October 26 – 28, 2012	Obama	49%	Romney	46.3%	2.7	765 LV	±3.5%
Public Policy Polling	October 26 – 28, 2012	Obama	51%	Romney	47%	4	718 LV	±3.7%
CBS News/Quinnipiac University	October 23 – 28, 2012	Obama	50%	Romney	45%	5	1,100 LV	±3%
Gravis Marketing	October 27, 2012	Obama	50%	Romney	49%	1	730 LV	±3.6%
Americans United for Change/Mellman Group (D)	October 23 – 25, 2012	Obama	49%	Romney	44%	5	600 LV	±4%
CNN/Opinion Research Corporation	October 23 – 25, 2012	Obama	50%	Romney	46%	4	741 RV	±3.5%
Purple Strategies	October 23 – 25, 2012	Obama	46%	Romney	44%	2	600 LV	±4.0%
American Research Group	October 23 – 25, 2012	Obama	49%	Romney	47%	2	600 LV	±4.0%
Time/Abt SRBI	October 22 – 23, 2012	Obama	49%	Romney	44%	5	783 LV	±3%
Rasmussen Reports/Pulse Opinion Research	October 23, 2012	Obama	48%	Romney	48%	Tied	750 LV	±4.0%
USAction/Lake Research (D)	October 20 – 23, 2012	Obama	46%	Romney	44%	2	600 LV	±4.0%
Ohio Newspaper Organization/University of Cincinnati	October 18 – 23, 2012	Obama	49%	Romney	49%	Tied	1,015 LV	±3.1%
WCMH-TV Columbus/SurveyUSA	October 20 – 22, 2012	Obama	47%	Romney	44%	3	609 LV	±4.1%
Suffolk University	October 18 – 21, 2012	Obama	47%	Romney	47%	Tied	600 LV	±4.0%
CBS News/Quinnipiac University	October 17–20, 2012	Obama	50%	Romney	45%	5	1,548 LV	±3%
Angus Reid Public Opinion	October 18–20, 2012	Obama	48%	Romney	48%	Tied	550 LV	±4.2%
Public Policy Polling	October 18–20, 2012	Obama	49%	Romney	48%	1	532 LV	±4.3%
Gravis Marketing	October 18 – 19, 2012	Obama	47%	Romney	47%	Tied	1,943 LV	±2.2%
Fox News/Anderson Robbins/Shaw & Company	October 17–18, 2012	Obama	46%	Romney	43%	3	1,131 LV	±3%
Rasmussen Reports/Pulse Opinion Research	October 17, 2012	Obama	49%	Romney	48%	1	750 LV	±4.0%
Let Freedom Ring/Pulse Opinion Research (R)	October 15, 2012	Obama	46%	Romney	47%	1	1,000 LV	±3.0%
WCMH-TV Columbus/SurveyUSA	October 12–15, 2012	Obama	45%	Romney	42%	3	613 LV	±4.0%
Public Policy Polling	October 12–13, 2012	Obama	51%	Romney	46%	5	880 LV	±3.3%
YouGov	October 4–11, 2012	Obama	50%	Romney	46%	4	851 LV	±4.8%
Rasmussen Reports/Pulse Opinion Research	October 10, 2012	Obama	48%	Romney	47%	1	750 LV	±4.0%
Gravis Marketing	October 6 – 10, 2012	Obama	45.1%	Romney	45.9%	0.8	1,313 LV	±2.7%
NBC News/Wall Street Journal/Marist College	October 7 – 9, 2012	Obama	51%	Romney	45%	6	994 LV	±3.1%
Let Freedom Ring/Pulse Opinion Research (R)	October 8, 2012	Obama	47%	Romney	46%	1	1,000 LV	±3.0%
WCMH-TV Columbus/SurveyUSA	October 5 – 8, 2012	Obama	45%	Romney	44%	1	808 LV	±3.5%
CNN/Opinion Research Corporation	October 5–8, 2012	Obama	51%	Romney	47%	4	722 LV	±3.5%
American Research Group	October 5 – 8, 2012	Obama	47%	Romney	48%	1	600 LV	±4.0%
Citizens United/Wenzel Strategies (R)	October 4–5, 2012	Obama	47.3%	Romney	48%	0.7	1,072 LV	±2.96%
Rasmussen Reports/Pulse Opinion Research	October 4, 2012	Obama	50%	Romney	49%	1	500 LV	±4.5%
Let Freedom Ring/Pulse Opinion Research (R)	October 1, 2012	Obama	50%	Romney	43%	7	1,000 LV	±3.0%
NBC News/Wall Street Journal/Marist College	September 30 – October 1, 2012	Obama	51%	Romney	43%	8	931 LV	±3.2%
Public Policy Polling	September 27 – 30, 2012	Obama	49%	Romney	45%	4	897 LV	±3.3%
Columbus Dispatch	September 19 – 29, 2012	Obama	51%	Romney	42%	9	1,662 LV	±2.2%
CBS News/New York Times/Quinnipiac University	September 18 – 24, 2012	Obama	53%	Romney	43%	10	1,162 LV	±3.0%
Washington Post	September 19 – 23, 2012	Obama	52%	Romney	44%	8	759 LV	±4.5%
Capitol Correspondent/Gravis Marketing	September 21 – 22, 2012	Obama	45.2%	Romney	44.3%	0.9	594 LV	±4.3%
Purple Strategies	September 15 – 19, 2012	Obama	48%	Romney	44%	4	600 LV	±4.0%
Ohio Newspaper Organization/University of Cincinnati	September 13 – 18, 2012	Obama	51%	Romney	46%	5	861 LV	±3.3%
Fox News/Anderson Robbins/Shaw & Company	September 16–18, 2012	Obama	49%	Romney	42%	7	1,009 LV	±3.0%
National Resource Defense Council/Public Policy Polling (D)	September 14–18, 2012	Obama	50%	Romney	44%	6	2,890 LV	Not reported
Secure America Now/Caddell Associates/Caddell Associates/McLaughlin & Associates (R)	September 13–15, 2012	Obama	47%	Romney	44%	3	600 LV	±4.0%
YouGov	September 7–14, 2012	Obama	47%	Romney	44%	3	1,036 LV	Not reported
Rasmussen Reports/Pulse Opinion Research	September 12, 2012	Obama	47%	Romney	46%	1	500 LV	±4.5%
American Research Group	September 10–12, 2012	Obama	48%	Romney	47%	1	600 LV	±4.0%
NBC News/Wall Street Journal/Marist College	September 9–12, 2012	Obama	50%	Romney	43%	7	979 LV	±3.1%
Public Policy Polling	September 7–9, 2012	Obama	50%	Romney	45%	5	1,072 LV	±3.0%
Capitol Correspondent/Gravis Marketing	September 7–8, 2012	Obama	47.27%	Romney	43.19%	4.08	1,548 LV	±2.7%
Capitol Correspondent/Gravis Marketing	September 2, 2012	Obama	43.7%	Romney	46.8%	3.1	1,381 RV	±2.9%

Three way race

Poll source	Date administered	Democrat	%	Republican	%	Libertarian	%	Lead margin	Sample Size	Margin of error
We Ask America	October 4, 2012	Barack Obama	46%	Mitt Romney	47%	Gary Johnson	1%	1	1,200 LV	±3%
Gravis Marketing	September 21–22, 2012	Barack Obama	45%	Mitt Romney	38%	Gary Johnson	11%	7	594 LV	±4.3%
Gravis Marketing	September 7–8, 2012	Barack Obama	45%	Mitt Romney	43%	Gary Johnson	5%	2	1,548 LV	±2.7%

=== Oklahoma ===
7 electoral votes
(Republican in 2004) 66%–34%
(Republican in 2008) 67%–34%

Poll source	Date administered	Democrat	%	Republican	%	Lead margin	Sample Size	Margin of error
SoonerPoll	October 18 – 24, 2012	Obama	33%	Romney	59%	26	305 LV	±5.6%

=== Oregon ===
7 electoral votes
(Democratic in 2004) 51%–47%
(Democratic in 2008) 57%–40%

Poll source	Date administered	Democrat	%	Republican	%	Lead margin	Sample Size	Margin of error
Public Policy Polling	October 31 – November 1, 2012	Obama	52%	Romney	46%	6	921 LV	±3.2%
Elway Research	October 25 – 28, 2012	Obama	47%	Romney	41%	6	405 LV	±5%
Hoffman Research	October 24 – 25, 2012	Obama	47%	Romney	42%	5	615 LV	±3.9%
Survey USA	October 16 – 18, 2012	Obama	49%	Romney	42%	7	579 LV	±4.2%
Survey USA	September 10–13, 2012	Obama	50%	Romney	41%	9	552 LV	±4.3%

=== Pennsylvania ===
20 electoral votes
(Democratic in 2004) 51%–48%
(Democratic in 2008) 54%–44%

Poll source	Date administered	Democrat	%	Republican	%	Lead margin	Sample Size	Margin of error
Gravis Marketing	November 4, 2012	Obama	49%	Romney	46%	3	1,060 LV	±3%
Angus Reid Public Opinion	November 2 – 4, 2012	Obama	51%	Romney	47%	4	479 LV	Not reported
Public Policy Polling	November 2 – 3, 2012	Obama	52%	Romney	46%	6	790 LV	±3.5%
Morning Call/Muhlenberg College	November 1 – 3, 2012	Obama	49%	Romney	46%	3	430 LV	±5%
YouGov	October 31 – November 3, 2012	Obama	52%	Romney	44%	8	1,273 LV	±3.3%
Pittsburgh Tribune-Review/Susquehanna Polling & Research Inc.	October 29–31, 2012	Obama	47%	Romney	47%	Tied	800 LV	±3.5%
Let Freedom Ring/Pulse Opinion Research (R)	October 30, 2012	Obama	49%	Romney	46%	3	1,000 LV	±3%
Franklin & Marshall College	October 23–28, 2012	Obama	49%	Romney	45%	4	547 LV	±4.2%
Philadelphia Inquirer/Global Strategy Group/National Research Inc.	October 23–25, 2012	Obama	49%	Romney	43%	6	600 LV	±4%
Rasmussen Reports/Pulse Opinion Research	October 24, 2012	Obama	51%	Romney	46%	5	500 LV	±4.5%
Gravis Marketing	October 21, 2012	Obama	48%	Romney	45%	3	887 LV	±3.3%
Morning Call/Muhlenberg College	October 17 – 21, 2012	Obama	50%	Romney	45%	5	444 LV	±5.0%
Angus Reid Public Opinion	October 18 – 20, 2012	Obama	52%	Romney	42%	10	559 LV	±4.2%
Let Freedom Ring/Pulse Opinion Research (R)	October 15, 2012	Obama	48%	Romney	44%	4	1,000 LV	±3%
Quinnipiac University	October 12 – 14, 2012	Obama	50%	Romney	46%	4	1,519 LV	±2.5%
Public Policy Polling	October 12 – 14, 2012	Obama	51%	Romney	44%	7	500 LV	±4.4%
Morning Call/Muhlenberg College	October 10 – 14, 2012	Obama	49%	Romney	45%	4	438 LV	±5.0%
YouGov	October 4–11, 2012	Obama	51%	Romney	44%	7	967 LV	±4.3%
Rasmussen Reports/Pulse Opinion Research	October 9, 2012	Obama	51%	Romney	46%	5	500 LV	±4.5%
Let Freedom Ring/Pulse Opinion Research (R)	October 8, 2012	Obama	47%	Romney	45%	2	1,000 LV	±3%
Philadelphia Inquirer/Global Strategy Group/National Research Inc.	October 4–8, 2012	Obama	50%	Romney	42%	8	600 LV	±4%
Siena College	October 1 – 5, 2012	Obama	43%	Romney	40%	3	545 LV	±4.2%
Morning Call/Muhlenberg College	September 22–26, 2012	Obama	49%	Romney	42%	7	427 LV	±5.0%
CBS News/New York Times/Quinnipiac University	September 18–24, 2012	Obama	54%	Romney	42%	12	1,180 LV	±3.0%
Franklin and Marshall College	September 18–23, 2012	Obama	52%	Romney	43%	9	392 LV	±4.9%
Tribune-Review/Susquehanna Polling & Research Inc.	September 18–20, 2012	Obama	47%	Romney	45%	2	800 LV	±3.46%
Mercyhurst University	September 12–20, 2012	Obama	48%	Romney	40%	8	522 LV	±4.29%
Rasmussen Reports/Pulse Opinion Research	September 19, 2012	Obama	51%	Romney	39%	12	500 LV	±4.5%
We Ask America	September 18, 2012	Obama	48.1%	Romney	42.2%	5.9	1,214 LV	±2.8%
National Research Defense Council/Public Policy Polling (D)	September 17–18, 2012	Obama	52%	Romney	40%	12	2,051 LV	±2.2%
Republican State Committee of Pennsylvania/Susquehanna Polling & Research Inc. (R)	September 15–17, 2012	Obama	48%	Romney	47%	1	800 LV	±3.46%
Morning Call/Muhlenberg College	September 10–16, 2012	Obama	50%	Romney	41%	9	640 LV	±4.0%
YouGov	September 7–14, 2012	Obama	52%	Romney	43%	9	1,139 LV	Not reported
Philadelphia Inquirer/Global Strategy Group/National Research Inc.	September 9–12, 2012	Obama	50%	Romney	39%	11	600 LV	±4%

Three-way race

Poll source	Date administered	Democrat	%	Republican	%	Libertarian	%	Margin	Sample size	Margin of error
Susquehanna Polling & Research Inc.	October 4 – 6, 2012	Barack Obama	47%	Mitt Romney	45%	Gary Johnson	3%	2	725 LV	±3.64%

Four-way race

Poll source	Date administered	Democrat	%	Republican	%	Libertarian	%	Green	%	Margin	Sample size	Margin of error
Republican State Committee of Pennsylvania/Susquehanna Polling & Research Inc. (R)	October 11–13, 2012	Barack Obama	45%	Mitt Romney	49%	Gary Johnson	2%	Jill Stein	1%	4	1,376 LV	±2.64%

=== Rhode Island ===
4 electoral votes
(Democratic in 2004) 59%–39%
(Democratic in 2008) 63%–35%

Poll source	Date administered	Democrat	%	Republican	%	Lead margin	Sample Size	Margin of error
WPRI 12/Fleming & Associates	October 24–27, 2012	Obama	54%	Romney	33%	21	601 LV	±4%
Brown University	September 26 – October 5, 2012	Obama	58.2%	Romney	32.3%	25.9	471 LV	±4.4%
WPRI 12/Fleming & Associates	September 26–29, 2012	Obama	57.3%	Romney	33.1%	24.2	501 LV	±4.38%

=== South Carolina ===
9 electoral votes
(Republican in 2004) 58%–41%
(Republican in 2008) 54%–45%

=== South Dakota ===
3 electoral votes
(Republican in 2004) 60%–38%
(Republican in 2008) 53%–45%

Poll source	Date administered	Democrat	%	Republican	%	Lead margin	Sample Size	Margin of error
Nielson Brothers Polling	October 31 – November 4, 2012	Obama	41%	Romney	53%	12	633 LV	±3.90%
Nielson Brothers Polling	October 28–31, 2012	Obama	42%	Romney	50%	8	671 LV	±3.78%
Nielson Brothers Polling	August 29 – September 6, 2012	Obama	39%	Romney	54%	15	509 LV	±4.34%
Nielson Brothers Polling	July 19–23, 2012	Obama	43%	Romney	49%	6	541 LV	±4.21%

=== Tennessee ===
11 electoral votes
(Republican in 2004) 57%–43%
(Republican in 2008) 57%–42%

Poll source	Date administered	Democrat	%	Republican	%	Lead margin	Sample Size	Margin of error
YouGov	October 31 – November 3, 2012	Obama	42%	Romney	53%	11	697 LV	±4%
Middle Tennessee State University	October 16 – 21, 2012	Obama	34%	Romney	59%	25	609 LV	±4%
YouGov	October 4 – 11, 2012	Obama	43%	Romney	52%	9	484 LV	±5%
YouGov	September 7 – 14, 2012	Obama	42%	Romney	50%	8	694 LV	Not reported

=== Texas ===
38 electoral votes
(Republican in 2004) 61%–38%
(Republican in 2008) 55%–44%

Poll source	Date administered	Democrat	%	Republican	%	Lead margin	Sample Size	Margin of error
YouGov	October 31 – November 3, 2012	Obama	38%	Romney	57%	19	1,563 LV	±3.2%
University of Texas at Austin/Texas Tribune/YouGov	October 15 – 21, 2012	Obama	39%	Romney	55%	16	540 LV	±4.22%
YouGov	October 4 – 11, 2012	Obama	41%	Romney	55%	14	958 LV	±4.5%
Texas Lyceum	September 10 – 26, 2012	Obama	39%	Romney	58%	19	443 LV	±4.66%
Wilson Perkins Allen Opinion Research	September 9–11, 2012	Obama	40%	Romney	55%	15	1,000 LV	±3.1%

=== Utah ===
6 electoral votes
(Republican in 2004) 72%–26%
(Republican in 2008) 62%–34%

Poll source	Date administered	Democrat	%	Republican	%	Lead margin	Sample Size	Margin of error
KSL-TV/Deseret News/Dan Jones & Associates	October 26 – November 1, 2012	Obama	26%	Romney	69%	43	870 LV	±3.4%
Brigham Young University/Key Research	October 9–13, 2012	Obama	20%	Romney	71%	51	500 LV	±4.4%
InsiderAdvantage	October 8–13, 2012	Obama	21%	Romney	74%	53	Not reported	±7.6%

=== Vermont ===
3 electoral votes
(Democratic in 2004) 59%–39%
(Democratic in 2008) 67%–30%

=== Virginia ===
13 electoral votes
(Republican in 2004) 54%–46%
(Democratic in 2008) 53%–46%

Poll source	Date administered	Democrat	%	Republican	%	Lead margin	Sample Size	Margin of error
Reuters/Ipsos	November 3–5, 2012	Obama	48%	Romney	46%	2	828 LV	±3.9%
Rasmussen Reports/Pulse Opinion Research	November 4, 2012	Obama	48%	Romney	50%	2	750 LV	±4%
Public Policy Polling	November 3–4, 2012	Obama	51%	Romney	47%	4	975 LV	±3.1%
Reuters/Ipsos	November 2–4, 2012	Obama	47%	Romney	46%	1	662 LV	±4.3%
Reuters/Ipsos	November 1–3, 2012	Obama	48%	Romney	45%	3	947 LV	±3.6%
YouGov	October 31 – November 3, 2012	Obama	48%	Romney	46%	2	1,497 LV	±2.7%
NBC News/Wall Street Journal/Marist College	November 1–2, 2012	Obama	48%	Romney	47%	1	1,165 LV	±2.9%
Reuters/Ipsos	October 31 – November 2, 2012	Obama	48%	Romney	45%	3	1,065 LV	±3.4%
Americans United for Change/Mellman Group (D)	October 30 – November 2, 2012	Obama	48%	Romney	45%	3	800 LV	±3.4%
We Ask America	October 30 – November 1, 2012	Obama	48.5%	Romney	47.6%	0.9	1,069 LV	±3%
Reuters/Ipsos	October 30 – November 1, 2012	Obama	49%	Romney	44%	5	792 LV	±4%
Health Care for America Now/Public Policy Polling (D)	October 30 – 31, 2012	Obama	49%	Romney	46%	3	600 LV	±4.0%
Let Freedom Ring/Pulse Opinion Research (R)	October 30, 2012	Obama	49%	Romney	48%	1	1,000 LV	±3%
CBS News/New York Times/Quinnipiac University	October 23 – 28, 2012	Obama	49%	Romney	47%	2	1,074 LV	±3%
Priorities USA Action/Garin-Hart-Yang Research Group (D)	October 25–27, 2012	Obama	49%	Romney	46%	3	807 LV	Not reported
Gravis Marketing	October 26, 2012	Obama	48%	Romney	48%	Tied	645 LV	±3.9%
Roanoke College	October 23–26, 2012	Obama	44%	Romney	49%	5	638 LV	±4%
The Washington Post	October 22–26, 2012	Obama	51%	Romney	47%	4	1,228 LV	±3.5%
Purple Strategies	October 23 – 25, 2012	Obama	47%	Romney	47%	Tied	600 LV	±4.0%
Rasmussen Reports/Pulse Opinion Research	October 24, 2012	Obama	48%	Romney	50%	2	750 LV	±4.0%
Fox News/Anderson Robbins/Shaw & Company	October 23–24, 2012	Obama	45%	Romney	47%	2	1126 LV	±3.0%
Health Care for America Now/Public Policy Polling (D)	October 23 – 24, 2012	Obama	51%	Romney	46%	5	722 LV	±3.6%
Americans United for Change/Mellman Group (D)	October 18 – 21, 2012	Obama	46%	Romney	45%	1	800 LV	±3.46%
Health Care for America Now/Public Policy Polling (D)	October 18 – 19, 2012	Obama	49%	Romney	47%	2	500 LV	±4.4%
Rasmussen Reports/Pulse Opinion Research	October 18, 2012	Obama	47%	Romney	50%	3	750 LV	±4.0%
Virginian-Pilot/Old Dominion University	September 19 – October 17, 2012	Obama	50%	Romney	43%	7	465 LV	±3.4%
League of Conservation Voters/Public Policy Polling (D)	October 15 – 16, 2012	Obama	49%	Romney	48%	1	733 LV	±3.6%
Let Freedom Ring/Pulse Opinion Research (R)	October 15, 2012	Obama	47%	Romney	46%	1	1,000 LV	±3.0%
American Research Group	October 12 – 14, 2012	Obama	47%	Romney	48%	1	600 LV	±4.0%
Kimball Political Consulting	October 12 – 13, 2012	Obama	43%	Romney	54%	11	696 LV	±3.7%
YouGov	October 4–11, 2012	Obama	46%	Romney	45%	1	743 LV	±4.0%
Rasmussen Reports/Pulse Opinion Research	October 11, 2012	Obama	47%	Romney	49%	2	750 LV	±4.0%
McLaughlin & Associates (R)	October 8–9, 2012	Obama	44%	Romney	51%	7	600 LV	±4.0%
NBC News/Wall Street Journal/Marist College	October 7–9, 2012	Obama	47%	Romney	48%	1	981 LV	±3.1%
CBS News/New York Times/Quinnipiac University	October 4–9, 2012	Obama	51%	Romney	46%	5	1,288 LV	±2.7%
Let Freedom Ring/Pulse Opinion Research (R)	October 8, 2012	Obama	48%	Romney	48%	Tied	1,000 LV	±3.0%
Public Policy Polling	October 4–7, 2012	Obama	50%	Romney	47%	3	725 LV	±3.7%
Rasmussen Reports/Pulse Opinion Research	October 4, 2012	Obama	48%	Romney	49%	1	500 LV	±4.5%
Let Freedom Ring/Pulse Opinion Research (R)	October 1, 2012	Obama	48%	Romney	47%	1	1,000 LV	±3.0%
NBC News/Wall Street Journal/Marist College	September 30 – October 1, 2012	Obama	48%	Romney	46%	2	969 LV	±3.1%
Roanoke College	September 19 – 28, 2012	Obama	47%	Romney	39%	8	589 LV	±4.0%
American Research Group	September 24 – 27, 2012	Obama	49%	Romney	47%	2	600 LV	±4.0%
National Research Defense Council/Public Policy Polling (D)	September 17–19, 2012	Obama	49%	Romney	43%	6	2,770 LV	±1.9%
Purple Strategies	September 15 – 19, 2012	Obama	46%	Romney	43%	3	600 LV	±4.0%
Fox News/Anderson Robbins/Shaw & Company	September 16–18, 2012	Obama	50%	Romney	43%	7	1,006 LV	±3.0%
CBS News/New York Times/Quinnipiac University	September 11–17, 2012	Obama	50%	Romney	46%	4	1,474 LV	±3.0%
Public Policy Polling	September 13–16, 2012	Obama	51%	Romney	46%	5	1,021 LV	±3.1%
Washington Post	September 12–16, 2012	Obama	52%	Romney	44%	8	847 LV	±3.5%
YouGov	September 7–14, 2012	Obama	48%	Romney	44%	4	753 LV	Not reported
Rasmussen Reports/Pulse Opinion Research	September 13, 2012	Obama	49%	Romney	48%	1	500 LV	±4.5%
NBC News/Wall Street Journal/Marist College	September 9–11, 2012	Obama	49%	Romney	44%	5	996 LV	±3.1%
Gravis Marketing	September 8–9, 2012	Obama	44.04%	Romney	49.39%	5.35	2,238 LV	±2.2%

Three-way race

Poll source	Date administered	Democrat	%	Republican	%	Libertarian	%	Margin	Sample size	Margin of error
Fox News/Anderson Robbins/Shaw & Company	October 23–24, 2012	Barack Obama	44%	Mitt Romney	46%	Virgil Goode	1%	2	1,126 LV	±3%
We Ask America	October 4, 2012	Barack Obama	45%	Mitt Romney	48%	Gary Johnson	2%	3	1,200 LV	±3%
We Ask America	September 17, 2012	Barack Obama	48.5%	Mitt Romney	45.7%	Gary Johnson	1.1%	2.8	1,238 LV	±2.8%

Four-way race

Poll source	Date administered	Democrat	%	Republican	%	Libertarian	%	Constitution	%	Lead margin	Sample size	Margin of error
NBC 12 (WWBT-Richmond)/Suffolk University	September 24 – 26, 2012	Barack Obama	46%	Mitt Romney	44%	Gary Johnson	1%	Virgil Goode	1%	2	600 LV	±4%

Five-way race

Poll source	Date administered	Democrat	%	Republican	%	Libertarian	%	Constitution	%	Green	%	Sample size	Margin of error
Citizens United/Wenzel Strategies (R)	October 19–20, 2012	Barack Obama	47.1%	Mitt Romney	49.2%	Gary Johnson	0.4%	Virgil Goode	0.3%	Jill Stein	0.4%	1,000 LV	±3.07%

=== Washington ===
12 electoral votes
(Democratic in 2004) 53%–46%
(Democratic in 2008) 58%–40%

Poll source	Date administered	Democrat	%	Republican	%	Lead margin	Sample Size	Margin of error
YouGov	October 31 – November 3, 2012	Obama	54%	Romney	40%	14	837 LV	Not reported
Public Policy Polling	November 1 – 3, 2012	Obama	53%	Romney	46%	7	932 LV	±3.2%
KING-TV Seattle/SurveyUSA	October 28 – 31, 2012	Obama	54%	Romney	40%	14	555 LV	±4.2%
KCTS9/University of Washington	October 18 – 31, 2012	Obama	57.1%	Romney	36.4%	20.7	632 LV	±3.9%
Strategies 360	October 17 – 20, 2012	Obama	52%	Romney	39%	13	500 LV	±4.4%
Washington Conservation Voters/Public Policy Polling (D)	October 15 – 16, 2012	Obama	50%	Romney	45%	5	574 LV	Not reported
KCTS9/University of Washington	October 1–16, 2012	Obama	51.9%	Romney	42.9%	9	644 LV	±3.9%
Rasmussen Reports/Pulse Opinion Research	October 14, 2012	Obama	55%	Romney	42%	13	500 LV	±4.5%
KING-TV Seattle/SurveyUSA	October 12 – 14, 2012	Obama	54%	Romney	40%	14	543 LV	±4.3%
YouGov	October 4–11, 2012	Obama	56%	Romney	39%	17	748 LV	±4.3%
KING-TV Seattle/SurveyUSA	September 28 – 30, 2012	Obama	56%	Romney	36%	20	540 LV	±4.3%
Rasmussen Reports/Pulse Opinion Research	September 26, 2012	Obama	52%	Romney	41%	11	500 LV	±4.5%
Gravis Marketing	September 21–22, 2012	Obama	56%	Romney	39%	17	625 LV	±4.6%
YouGov	September 7–14, 2012	Obama	53%	Romney	39%	14	880 LV	Not reported
Elway Research	September 9–12, 2012	Obama	53%	Romney	36%	17	405 RV	±5.0%
Washington Conservation Voters/Public Policy Polling (D)	September 7–9, 2012	Obama	53%	Romney	42%	11	563 LV	Not reported
KING-TV Seattle/SurveyUSA	September 7–9, 2012	Obama	54%	Romney	38%	16	524 LV	±4.4%

=== West Virginia ===
5 electoral votes
(Republican in 2004) 56%–43%
(Republican in 2008) 56%–43%

=== Wisconsin ===
10 electoral votes
(Democratic in 2004) 50%–49%
(Democratic in 2008) 56%–42%

Poll source	Date administered	Democrat	%	Republican	%	Lead margin	Sample Size	Margin of error
Public Policy Polling	November 2 – 3, 2012	Obama	51%	Romney	48%	3	1,256 LV	±2.8%
Angus Reid Public Opinion	November 1–3, 2012	Obama	53%	Romney	46%	7	482 LV	±4.5%
YouGov	October 31 – November 3, 2012	Obama	50%	Romney	46%	4	1,225 LV	±3.1%
USAction/Project New America/Project New America/Grove Insight (D)	November 1–2, 2012	Obama	48%	Romney	42%	6	500 LV	±4.4%
We Ask America	October 30 – November 1, 2012	Obama	51.5%	Romney	44.8%	6.7	1,210 LV	±3%
Citizens United/Wenzel Strategies (R)	October 30–31, 2012	Obama	49%	Romney	47%	2	1,074 LV	±3%
Let Freedom Ring/Pulse Opinion Research (R)	October 30, 2012	Obama	49%	Romney	48%	1	1,000 LV	±3%
Health Care for America Now/Public Policy Polling (D)	October 29–30, 2012	Obama	51%	Romney	46%	5	825 LV	±3.4%
Rasmussen Reports/Pulse Opinion Research	October 29, 2012	Obama	49%	Romney	49%	Tie	750 LV	±4%
NBC News/Wall Street Journal/Marist College	October 28–29, 2012	Obama	49%	Romney	46%	3	1,065 LV	±3%
St. Norbert College	October 25–29, 2012	Obama	51%	Romney	42%	9	402 LV	±5%
Marquette Law School	October 25–28, 2012	Obama	51%	Romney	43%	8	1,243 LV	±2.8%
Rasmussen Reports/Pulse Opinion Research	October 25, 2012	Obama	49%	Romney	49%	Tie	500 LV	±4.5%
Project New America/Grove Insight (D)	October 24–25, 2012	Obama	48%	Romney	43%	5	500 LV	±4.4%
Health Care for America Now/Public Policy Polling (D)	October 23–24, 2012	Obama	51%	Romney	45%	6	827 LV	±3.4%
Angus Reid Public Opinion	October 18–20, 2012	Obama	51%	Romney	46%	5	469 LV	Not reported
Rasmussen Reports/Pulse Opinion Research	October 18, 2012	Obama	50%	Romney	48%	2	500 LV	±4.5%
Project New America/Grove Insight (D)	October 17–18, 2012	Obama	47%	Romney	44%	3	500 LV	±4.4%
Mason-Dixon Polling & Research	October 15 – 17, 2012	Obama	48%	Romney	46%	2	625 LV	±4%
NBC News/Wall Street Journal/Marist College	October 15 – 17, 2012	Obama	51%	Romney	45%	6	1,013 LV	±3.1%
Let Freedom Ring/Pulse Opinion Research (R)	October 15, 2012	Obama	50%	Romney	47%	3	1,000 LV	±3%
Marquette Law School	October 11–14, 2012	Obama	49%	Romney	48%	1	870 LV	±3.4%
YouGov	October 4 – 11, 2012	Obama	51%	Romney	47%	4	638 LV	±4.9%
CBS News/New York Times/Quinnipiac University	October 4–9, 2012	Obama	50%	Romney	47%	3	1,327 LV	±2.7%
Rasmussen Reports/Pulse Opinion Research	October 9, 2012	Obama	51%	Romney	49%	2	500 LV	±4.5%
Let Freedom Ring/Pulse Opinion Research (R)	October 8, 2012	Obama	50%	Romney	46%	4	1,000 LV	±3.0%
Public Policy Polling	October 4 – 6, 2012	Obama	49%	Romney	47%	2	979 LV	±3.1%
Let Freedom Ring/Pulse Opinion Research (R)	October 1, 2012	Obama	51%	Romney	44%	7	1,000 LV	±3.0%
JZ Analytics	September 29–30, 2012	Obama	48.9%	Romney	38.8%	10.1	414 LV	±4.9%
Marquette Law School	September 27 – 30, 2012	Obama	53%	Romney	42%	11	894 LV	±3.3%
Public Policy Polling	September 18 – 19, 2012	Obama	52%	Romney	45%	7	842 LV	±3.4%
NBC News/Wall Street Journal/Marist College	September 16 – 18, 2012	Obama	50%	Romney	45%	5	968 LV	±3.2%
Rasmussen Reports/Pulse Opinion Research	September 17, 2012	Obama	49%	Romney	46%	3	500 LV	±4.5%
CBS News/New York Times/Quinnipiac University	September 11–17, 2012	Obama	51%	Romney	45%	6	1,485 LV	±3.0%
Marquette Law School	September 13–16, 2012	Obama	54%	Romney	40%	14	601 LV	±4%
YouGov	September 7–14, 2012	Obama	48%	Romney	47%	1	753 LV	Not reported
Democracy for America/Public Policy Polling (D)	September 12–13, 2012	Obama	49%	Romney	48%	1	959 LV	±3.16%

Three way race

Poll source	Date administered	Democrat	%	Republican	%	Libertarian	%	Lead margin	Sample Size	Margin of error
We Ask America	September 20 – 23, 2012	Barack Obama	52.5%	Mitt Romney	41.0%	Gary Johnson	1.2%	12	1,238 LV	±2.8%

=== Wyoming ===
3 electoral votes
(Republican in 2004) 69%–29%
(Republican in 2008) 65%–33%

No polls conducted

== See also ==
- Nationwide opinion polling for the 2012 United States presidential election
- Nationwide opinion polling for the 2012 Republican Party presidential primaries
- Statewide opinion polling for the 2012 Republican Party presidential primaries
- Statewide opinion polling for the 2008 United States presidential election
- 2012 Republican Party presidential primaries
