= Opinion polling for the 2012 United States presidential election =

Opinion polling for the 2012 United States presidential election may refer to:

- Nationwide opinion polling for the 2012 United States presidential election
- Statewide opinion polling for the 2012 United States presidential election
