= TrueMajority =

U.S. political advocacy group

- Founded: June 2002
- Dissolved: September 2007; 19 years ago
- Merged into: USAction
- Ideology: Progressivism
- Political position: Center-left

Website
- www.truemajority.org

TrueMajority was a left-wing advocacy group in the United States. In September 2007, TrueMajority and its related organization TrueMajorityACTION merged with USAction. By 2008, the combined groups had over 700,000 members, making it, together with MoveOn, one of the two largest liberal advocacy groups in the United States.

TrueMajorityACTION was a separate but closely related organization, which had a different status under U.S. law so that it could campaign for specific parties and politicians.

In 2007, TrueMajority merged with USAction in 2007. In 2012, Ben Cohen founded Stamp Stampede.

== History ==
TrueMajority was founded in June 2002 by Ben Cohen, co-founder of Ben & Jerry's.

TrueMajority was mentioned on The Colbert Report on March 5, 2007, when Ben and Jerry made a guest appearance. In the episode, they offered free frisbees to Colbert viewers who visited the web site, and then they signed up each viewer who visited as a member of the advocacy group.

TrueMajority's Ten Principles were endorsed by Greenpeace USA, Rock the Vote, Physicians for Social Responsibility, Peace Action, the National Head Start Association, Global Exchange, The Interfaith Alliance, The Nation, Sojourners, Rainforest Action Network, Women's Action for New Directions, Service Employees International Union, and National Council of La Raza.

== Stances ==
TrueMajority organized protests of the 2008 G-20 Summit. It also opposed the 2008 financial bailout of banks, and helped to organize protests of the bailout.

In 2004 TrueMajority ran advertisements calling for a paper trail in electronic voting.

=== Iraq war opposition ===
TrueMajority co-sponsored protests and advertisements against the Iraq war in 2003. The organization published anti-war advertisements in the New York Times and Wall Street Journal, but its ads were refused by television networks including CNN, Fox, MTV, and Comedy Central. TrueMajority also supported Howard Dean in the 2004 Democratic primary, mounting a letter-writing campaign and arguing for his support on the grounds of his opposition to the Iraq War. In 2008 TrueMajority gathered over 20,000 petitions to urge CalPERS to investigate KBR for war profiteering, including in the petitions accusations of rape and murder.
