= Let Freedom Ring, Inc. =

American advocacy organization

- Formation: 2004
- Type: Non-profit, public policy think tank
- Headquarters: Wilmington, Delaware, U.S.
- President: Colin A. Hanna
- Revenue: $0 (2022)
- Expenses: $1540 (2022)
- Website: letfreedomringusa.com

Let Freedom Ring, Inc. is an American conservative advocacy organization. It is organized as a 501(c)(4) entity, and in 2014 created a super PAC. Let Freedom Ring has Colin Hanna as its president and has employed Timothy Goeglein as a consultant.

== Organization ==
Let Freedom Ring was founded in 2004 with a $1 million donation from John Templeton Jr., President of the John Templeton Foundation. Hanna is a former County Commissioner in Chester County, Pennsylvania, and is an evangelical Episcopalian. In his role as president of the organization, Hanna has written on issues including a fence on the southern border, work visas, copyright, protest art of the Tea Party movement, the navy, the Iran deal, recipients of Weyrich Awards, Trump 2016 campaign issues, and taxation.

In 2014, Let Freedom Ring funded a super PAC called Key Questions, Key Answers that ran attack ads against Tom Wolf in Pennsylvania.

== Activities ==
Let Freedom Ring promotes conservative ideals within the Republican party and opposes liberal ideals of the Democratic party.

=== Presidency of George W. Bush ===
Let Freedom Ring promoted George W. Bush to religious conservative voters in 2004. Let Freedom Ring supported the neo-conservative agenda led by President George W. Bush, including advocating for a fence along the U.S.–Mexico border. It advocated for Ohio's ban on same-sex marriage in 2004.

=== Presidency of Barack Obama ===
Let Freedom Ring ran attack ads against Obama in 2008. It was involved in organizing the nationwide Tea Party movement protests on April 15, 2009, in part by sending out robocalls to potential participants the day before. The organization received some signatures from Senators, on a pledge to give voters an opportunity to read Obamacare, and read it themselves, before voting on the bill. Hanna, its president, said the treatment by the media of the topic of domestic terrorism, in particular renewed coverage of Timothy McVeigh in 2010, was being politicized. As the broader right-wing opposition to the Obama administration unified, the organization supported the election of politicians associated with the Tea Party movement in 2010 and later years. During 2011, it worked with tea-party-affiliated politicians and activists to oppose increasing the debt ceiling.

During the 2012 election cycle, the organization worked with other groups to get signatures from all major contenders for the Republican nominee in support of a balanced budget amendment, along with a campaign promise to cut federal spending if elected. It signed the Mount Vernon statement with other conservative activist groups. It continued to oppose the Obama administration during his second term, and also continued to support religious causes.

The organization worked with Marco Rubio on immigration reform during 2013. In 2013, it opposed the Karl Rove-backed American Crossroads within the context of the Republican party primaries and caucuses, as well as criticized the congressional leadership John Boehner and Steve Scalise over the firing of RSC staffer Paul Teller, despite being initially tentatively supportive of Boehner as speaker.

=== Presidency of Donald Trump ===
The organization's president Hanna met with Scott Walker in May 2015, to discuss issues important to social conservatives such as abortion. It hosted a tax day protest in April 2016 with Grover Norquist. Hanna did not back the Donald Trump 2016 presidential campaign during the Republican primaries and caucuses. In mid-December 2020, Hanna signed a letter that alleged that the 2020 United States presidential election was invalid, part of false claims of fraud in support of Trump.
