= Secure America Now =

Secure America Now Foundation
- Abbreviation: SAN
- Formation: July 1, 2011
- Type: 501(c)(4)
- Tax ID no.: 45-2661495
- Registration no.: EXTUID_4106849
- Website: sanfound.org

SECUREAMERICANOW.ORG
- Abbreviation: SAN
- Formation: October 15, 2010
- Type: 501(C)(4)
- Registration no.: EXTUID_2702453
- Website: www.secureamericanow.org

Secure America Now (SAN) is a politically conservative nonprofit group that focuses on United States foreign policy issues.

== Notable activities ==
In 2012, SAN created an advertisement that featured Israeli prime minister Benjamin Netanyahu warning Florida residents about the threat of nuclear weapons in Iran. The advertisement aired in three markets in Florida that represented some of the state's largest Jewish communities.

In 2014, SAN sponsored a trip by Texas senator Ted Cruz to Ukraine and other eastern European countries in which Cruz met with leaders of Euromaidan, the protest movement that led to the ousting of Ukraine's pro-Russian president Viktor Yanukovych.

Later that year, SAN created "Secure the Border" advertisements that attacked four Democratic senators and one Democratic congressman for their positions on U.S. immigration policy. One of the advertisements, which targeted New Hampshire senator Jeanne Shaheen, showed an image of murdered journalist James Foley and was condemned by both Shaheen and Scott Brown, her general election opponent. The advertisement was pulled a few days later.

In 2015, SAN conducted a poll in which 77% of likely voters in the 2016 United States presidential election said that Congress should be involved in the Joint Comprehensive Plan of Action, the nuclear deal that the Obama administration was negotiating with Iran.

Shortly before the United States presidential election in 2016, SAN published videos and accompanying web sites suggesting that the Islamic State of Iraq and the Levant (ISIS) would overthrow France and Germany.

== Organization ==
SAN's president is Allen Roth, the political adviser of Ronald Lauder. Its board of directors includes several prominent Republicans, including Mike Huckabee and John R. Bolton.

=== Funding ===
As a 501(c)(4) nonprofit organization, SAN is not required to disclose its donors. OpenSecrets reported that the main funders in 2016 were Hedge Fund manager Robert Mercer, former Best Buy CEO Brad Anderson, Best Buy founder Richard Schulze, and Estee Lauder heir Ronald Lauder, who gave $1.1 Million .
