= Health Care for America NOW! =

U.S. grassroots healthcare reform coalition

Health Care for America Now (HCAN) is a political advocacy group of more than 1,000 organizations that joined together in 2008 in a successful effort to promote legislation to reform the United States health care system and extend medical benefits to most of the population that is currently uninsured. The Patient Protection and Affordable Care Act (PPACA or ACA) was signed into law by President Barack Obama on March 23, 2010, and HCAN was credited with being a "major contributor" to its passage. After enactment of the law, HCAN shifted its activities to defending the law from opposition attacks and advocating for the law before Congress and state regulatory agencies.

== Organization ==
HCAN is directed by a steering committee that consists of a wide range of tax-exempt public charities, advocacy organizations, labor unions and civil rights groups. HCAN is a 501(c)(4) issue advocacy organization that runs national and state-based legislative and regulatory campaigns through grassroots action, public education, aggressive media outreach, research and policy analysis. It works in cooperation with its 501(c)(3) partner, Health Care for America Education Fund, a project of the Tides Center, a public charity.

The "national organizations" that are members of the umbrella group is composed of the following organizations:

- 9 to 5, National Association of Working Women
- Abundant Children and Family Services
- Adventists Community Services
- AFL–CIO
- AIDS in Action
- Alliance for a Just Society
- Alliance for Retired Americans
- American Academy of Family Physicians
- American Academy of Nursing
- American Academy of Pediatrics
- American Family Voices
- American Federation of State, County and Municipal Employees
- American Federation of Teachers
- American Federation of Television and Radio Artists
- American Medical Student Association
- American Nurses Association
- Americans for Democratic Action
- Americans United for Change
- AskSlim.org
- Asian and Pacific Islander American Health Forum
- Association for Better Insulation
- Black Women’s Health Imperative
- Brave New Films
- Bus Federation
- Cafemom.com
- Campaign for America's Future
- Campaign for Community Change
- Campus Progress Action
- CareTALK
- Center for American Progress Action Fund
- Center for Rural Affairs
- Center for Science in the Public Interest
- Center for Social and Economic Justice
- Child Advocate Network
- Children’s Defense Fund
- Communications Workers of America
- Committee of Interns and Residents/SEIU Healthcare
- Commonwealth Institute
- Communications Workers of America
- Community Action Partnership
- Community Service Society
- Clergy Strategic Alliances, LLC
- CREDO Mobile
- Democracy for America
- Democracia Ahora
- Direct Care Alliance
- Eagle Medical Services
- Human Rights Campaign
- Leadership Center for the Common Good
- Leadership Conference on Civil Rights
- League of United Latin American Citizens
- MoveOn.org
- National Abortion Federation
- National Association for the Advancement of Colored People
- National Council of Jewish Women
- National Council of La Raza
- National Congress of American Indians
- National Education Association
- National Women's Law Center
- Planned Parenthood Federation of America
- Progressive Future
- Rock the Vote
- Service Employees International Union
- United Auto Workers
- United Food and Commercial Workers
- USAction
- Women's Voices. Women Vote
- Working America

== Funding and activities ==
Funding for HCAN's operations has come from its member organizations, individual contributions and foundations, including the Atlantic Philanthropies. HCAN also received $5 million from billionaire George Soros. In their $50 million campaign for passage of the ACA, HCAN mounted a multi-faceted field program that included television advertising events, demonstrations, and advocacy meetings with government officials across the country.

HCAN assembled a network of state-based advocacy groups to carry the message from the ground up to members of Congress—an effort widely credited with strengthening like-minded organizations. HCAN published numerous research reports and conducted extensive media outreach during the legislative campaign. An outside evaluation praised HCAN's "effective and disciplined strategic planning, decision-making and implementation; well-thought-out benchmarks; strong and effective internal leadership, efficient allocation of resources to staff and to fund a wide-ranging field program; resilience to buffeting external events; and its creation of opportunities for supporters to meaningfully engage with the movement for reform through multiple points of entry."

== Major actions ==
HCAN's two largest public demonstrations occurred on June 25, 2009, when thousands of people from around the nation converged on Capitol Hill in Washington, D.C., for a rally in support of health reform, and on March 9, 2010, when more than 5,000 people rallied on the street outside a health insurance industry conference at the Ritz-Carlton Hotel in Washington, D.C. HCAN led grassroots online activists, conducted news conferences and published reports on health insurance industry profits, executive compensation, concentration of market power, and mistreatment of consumers and health care providers.

== Affordable Care Act ==
HCAN did not achieve one of its central goals, the creation of a so-called public option, a government-run health plan that would introduce greater competition into local health insurance markets, nearly all of which are dominated by one or two large companies. Republicans joined with conservative democrats to block the public option and a proposal to allow Americans over 55 years old to pay unsubsidized premiums to the government to purchase Medicare benefits, which now are provided to the elderly and disabled through a single-payer system that picks up the vast majority of patients' costs. Despite those losses, HCAN supports the Affordable Care Act and frequently declares that the ACA's impact will be extensive in the policy and political arenas.

== Activities since enactment of Affordable Care Act ==
In 2010, as a result of political and legal challenges to the ACA, in 2010 HCAN transitioned from campaigning for passage of the law to a broad campaign to fully implement health care reform at the state and federal level. HCAN's executive director, Ethan Rome, has repeatedly declared in media statements and in frequent writings on Huffington Post that Congress and the Obama administration should carry out all implementation activities. HCAN has said it intends to do this by identifying significant public policy issues as they arise and taking responsibility to lead campaigns to address them in collaboration with the diverse membership of its coalition. These efforts include pushing for strong accountability measures for insurance companies and countering what HCAN claims is false information that has been systematically disseminated by opponents of the law. HCAN continues to prepare reports that they believe highlight insurance industry excesses and abuses and to educate the public about developments related to implementation of the law by state and federal agencies.

In the fall of 2010, HCAN co-produced a short, two-part satirical comedy video starring Jack Black and America Ferrera about professional "Mis-informant" Nathan Spewman, who spreads lies about the Affordable Care Act as part of an industry propaganda campaign.
