= Mark Mellman =

American political consultant (1955–2025)

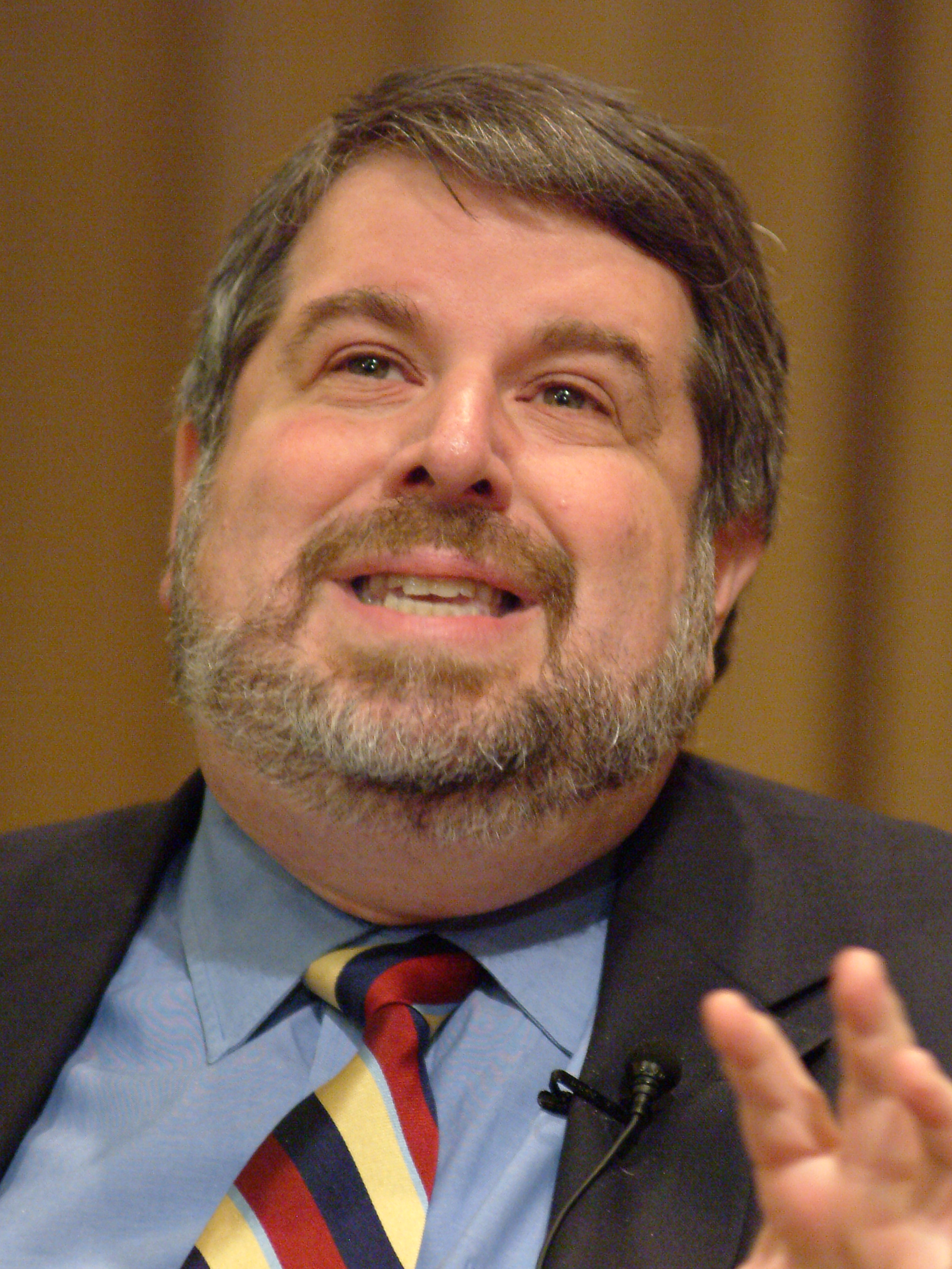
- Mellman in 2008
- Born: September 13, 1955; Hampton, Virginia, U.S.
- Died: November 20, 2025 (aged 70); Washington, D.C., U.S.
- Education: Princeton University; Yale University
- Occupations: Pollster; political consultant
- Years active: 1980s–2025
- Political party: Democratic
- Spouse: Mindy Horowitz (m. 1988)
- Children: 3

Mark Steven Mellman (September 13, 1955 – November 20, 2025) was an American pollster and political consultant. He was the founder of The Mellman Group, a polling and opinion research firm. In 2019, he formed the Democratic Majority for Israel (DMFI), a Democratic Party-aligned organization that supports pro-Israel candidates. Mellman also served as president of the American Association of Political Consultants.

== Early life and education ==
Mellman was born on September 13, 1955, in Hampton, Virginia, and was raised in Columbus, Ohio. He graduated from Princeton University in 1978 and received his MA in Political Science at Yale University.

== Career ==
While at Yale in 1981, Mellman was hired by Bruce Morrison, a candidate for Connecticut's 3rd congressional district in the 1982 election; though Morrison was considered an underdog candidate at the time of the election, he ultimately won the race by a narrow margin. Following this, Mellman formed Information Associates in Washington, D.C. In 1986, the group was incorporated as The Mellman Group.

In 2004, John Kerry's presidential campaign was an early Mellman Group client, a race Kerry ultimately lost. Speaking after the election, Mellman says he foresaw the outcome of that Swiftboat campaign against Kerry. As the campaign grew, with advertising and coverage heavy on right-wing media such as Fox News and the Drudge Report, Mellman said that he saw in the polls a tide turning against Kerry.

As of 2016, Mellman was president of the American Association of Political Consultants. In January 2019, Mellman and other Democratic strategists started Democratic Majority for Israel, a group whose mission is to promote pro-Israel candidates among Democrats, especially in primary elections.

Mellman regularly participated in AIPAC conferences, for example speaking at a 2019 AIPAC event in Columbus alongside Neil Newhouse and working directly for AIPAC in the past. In 2015, Mellman consulted for a $25 million advertising campaign for the AIPAC-funded group Nuclear Free Iran. Based on the premise that increased exposure to details of the deal would lead most Americans to oppose it, Mellman's campaign recommendations aimed to disrupt the Iran nuclear agreement by increasing public skepticism. Mellman's firm received a quarter million dollars for its work. Mellman consulted for other Jewish and pro-Israel organizations as well.

Since Yair Lapid entered politics, Mellman acted as a senior strategist for him. He described his relationship with Lapid and Yesh Atid as differing from his other clients. He noted that this relationship goes back very far, with Mellman helping decide the name of the party.

== Political views ==
In 2013, Mellman commented on increasing sympathy for Palestinians over Israelis among Democrats according to polling data. Mellman argued that this shift remained small, but suggested handling the issue while it remained minor. He said the best way to do so would be by appealing to specific communities through their own angles, such as LGBT issues, Immigration, and health care access, while at the same time confronting the Israel issue head on.

In late 2019, Mellman commented on a speech by Senator and Democratic Party presidential candidate Bernie Sanders to the liberal Jewish group J Street. Mellman opposed Sanders' suggestion that he would use the $3.8 billion in U.S. aid to Israel as leverage to promote humanitarian policies in the Gaza strip. Mellman suggested that cutting aid for Israel "is not an opinion that is widely shared in the Democratic Party at all. ... Is there a segment of the community that likes those views? Yes. But that's a pretty small segment."

In 2010, Mellman suggested that Rasmussen Reports tended to be the most heavily stacked against Democratic candidates in elections.

== Personal life and death ==
Mellman married Mindy Horowitz in 1988; the couple had three children. He was an active member of the Modern Orthodox synagogue Kesher Israel in Washington, D.C.

Mellman died from pancreatic cancer in Washington, D.C., on November 20, 2025, at the age of 70.
