= USAction =

American federation of community organizations

- Founder: Heather Booth
- Founded: 1999
- Dissolved: 2016
- Merged into: People's Action
- Ideology: Progressivism
- Political position: Center-left

Website
- www.usaction.org

USAction was a 501(c)(4) federation of progressive community organizing groups. It was founded in 1999 by Heather Booth. Its 501(c)(3) counterpart was the USAction Education Fund.

In September 2007, TrueMajority and its related organization TrueMajorityACTION merged with USAction. In 2016, USAction merged into People's Action.

== Activities ==
In 2008, USAction joined Health Care for America Now, a coalition of labor unions and liberal advocacy groups pushing for affordable health care and stricter regulation of the health insurance industry. USAction committed at least $500,000 to the group's efforts.

In 2009, USAction launched a campaign to "Dog the Blue Dogs." The Blue Dog Coalition is a caucus of United States Congressional Representatives from the Democratic Party who identify themselves as moderates and conservatives.

In 2012, USAction was part of a coalition of liberal advocacy groups that announced that companies making direct corporate contributions to influence elections would face consumer boycotts, campaigns to divest pension fund money, stockholder lawsuits, actions at stockholder meetings and widespread social media exposure.
