= Breezy Corner, Pennsylvania =

Unincorporated community in Pennsylvania, US

- Unincorporated community
- Location within Pennsylvania Location within the United States
- Coordinates: 40°24′40″N 75°50′47″W
- Country: United States
- State: Pennsylvania
- County: Berks
- Township: Alsace and Ruscombmanor
- Elevation: 909 ft (277 m)
- Time zone: UTC-5 (Eastern (EST))
  - Summer (DST): UTC-4 (EDT)
- ZIP Code: 19522
- Area codes: 610 and 484
- GNIS feature ID: 1203144

Breezy Corner is an unincorporated community in Berks County, Pennsylvania, United States. The village is located northeast of Reading on South Mountain and is served by the Oley Valley School District. Breezy Corner is located along the border between Alsace Township and Ruscombmanor Township.

PA Route 12 intersects PA Route 73 in the village and follows Pricetown Road into the northern side of Reading, where it becomes the Warren Street Bypass. Breezy Corner is served by the Fleetwood post office, which uses the ZIP code of 19522.
