= U.S. Route 222 Business (Reading, Pennsylvania) =

Highway in Pennsylvania

U.S. Route 222 Business

Route information
- Auxiliary route of US 222
- Maintained by PennDOT
- Length: 12.173 mi (19.591 km)
- Existed: 1975–present

Major junctions
- South end: US 222 in Cumru Township
- PA 724 in Shillington; PA 625 in Reading; PA 10 in Reading; US 422 in Reading; US 422 Bus. in Reading; PA 61 in Reading; PA 12 in Muhlenberg Township
- North end: US 222 in Ontelaunee Township

Location
- Country: United States
- State: Pennsylvania
- Counties: Berks

Highway system
- United States Numbered Highway System; List; Special; Divided; Pennsylvania State Route System; Interstate; US; State; Scenic; Legislative

U.S. Route 222 Business (US 222 Bus.) is a 12.17-mile (19.59 km) business route of US 222 in Reading, Pennsylvania. The southern terminus is at US 222 in Cumru Township. Its northern terminus is at US 222 in Ontelaunee Township. The route begins at the US 222 freeway and heads through the southwestern suburbs of Reading as Lancaster Avenue, intersecting Pennsylvania Route 724 (PA 724) in Shillington. US 222 Bus. continues into Reading on Lancaster terminus and intersects the northern terminus of PA 625 and PA 10 before reaching an interchange with the US 422 freeway.

The business route crosses the Schuylkill River and becomes Bingaman Street. US 222 Bus. turns north on 5th Street and intersects US 422 Bus. in downtown Reading and the southern terminus of PA 61 to the north of downtown. The route interchanges with the PA 12 freeway and continues north through suburban Muhlenberg Township as 5th Street Highway. US 222 Bus. reaches Temple and continues northeast to its northern terminus as Allentown Pike. US 222 Bus. is the only auxiliary route of US 222 in Pennsylvania.

With the creation of the U.S. Highway System in 1926, the road between Reading and Lancaster was designated US 222 while the road between Reading and Allentown was part of US 22, which ran along what was designated the William Penn Highway in 1916 and PA 3 in 1924. In the late 1920s, US 222 briefly ran concurrent with PA 41 and PA 240 at different times. PA 42 originally ran north–south through Reading starting in 1927. By 1930, the concurrent state route designations were removed from US 222 and US 22. US 222 entered Reading along with PA 73 along Lancaster Avenue and Bingaman Street before turning north on 9th Street along with PA 83 to end at US 22 and US 422 at Penn Street.

US 22 continued north on 9th Street out of Reading and continued along Kutztown Road through Temple toward Allentown. US 120 began at US 222 at Bingaman Street and headed north on 4th Street and Center Street out of Reading. In 1931, US 22 was moved to a more direct alignment between Harrisburg and Allentown, and US 222 was extended north along the former alignment between Reading and Allentown. US 222 was shifted to use Lancaster Avenue, Bingaman Street, and 5th Street and 5th Street Highway through the Reading area in the 1930s, running concurrent with US 122 through downtown Reading. The US 122 overlap was removed in 1963 and the PA 73 concurrency was removed by 1966. In 1975, US 222 was rerouted to bypass Reading on the West Shore Bypass and the Warren Street Bypass, with the former alignment through the city becoming US 222 Bus. In 1998, US 222 Bus. was extended north to its current terminus following the rerouting of US 222 to a new outer bypass of Reading. The business route was extended south to its current endpoint in 2004 with the completion of the US 222 freeway south of Reading to Mohnton.

== Route description ==
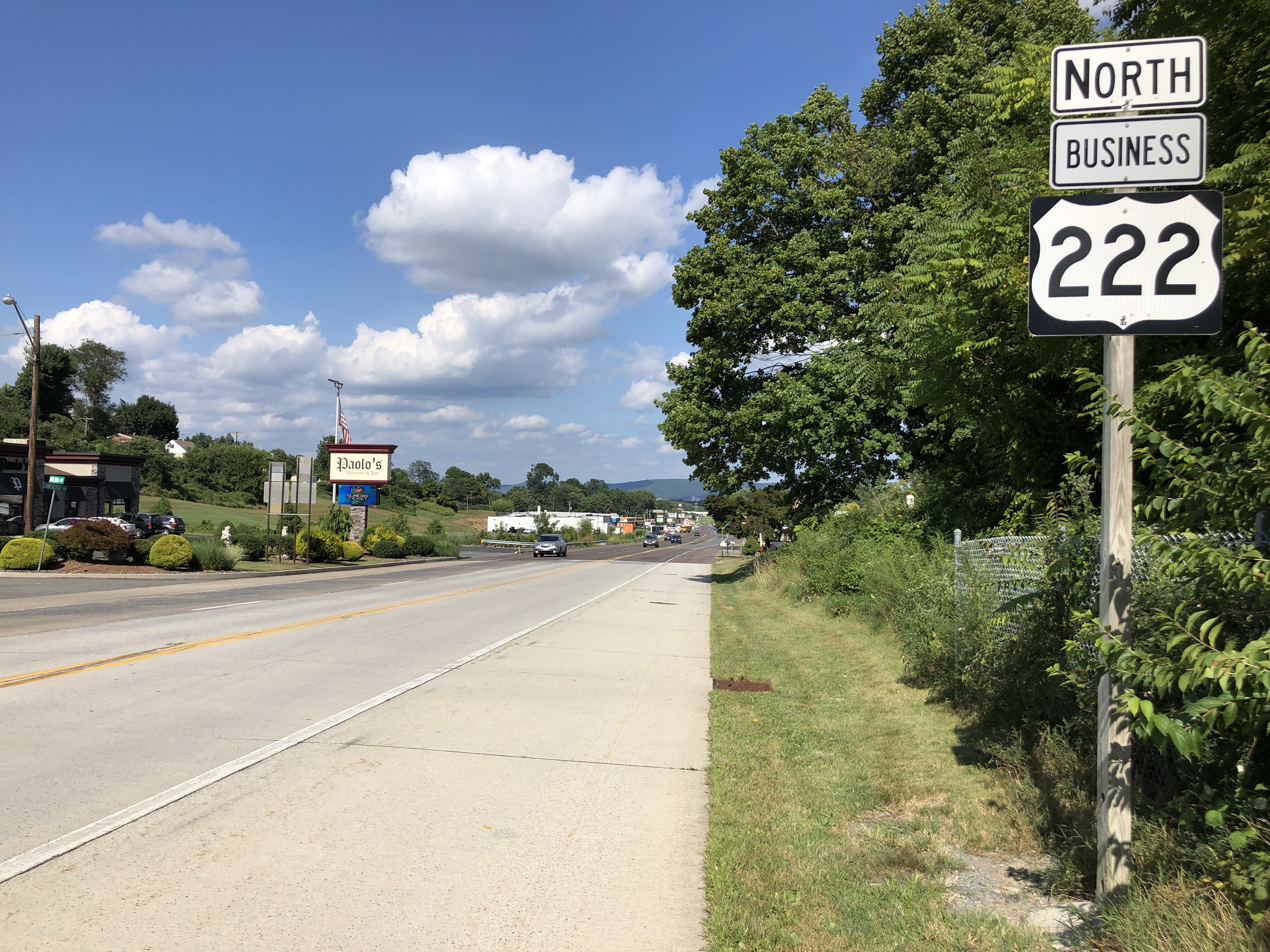
US 222 Bus. northbound past the southern terminus at US 222 in Cumru Township

US 222 Bus. begins at an interchange with the US 222 freeway near Mohnton in Cumru Township, Berks County, with access from the northbound lanes and access to the southbound lanes. From this interchange, the business route heads northeast on Lancaster Avenue, a four-lane road with one northbound lane, two southbound lanes, and a center left-turn lane that passes a mix of homes and businesses. The road passes through the community of Montrose before it comes to an intersection with PA 724, where it widens to a four-lane divided highway. At this point, PA 724 turns east to form a concurrency with US 222 Bus. on Lancaster Avenue, a five-lane road with a center left-turn lane. The road briefly runs along the border between the borough of Wyomissing to the north and Cumru Township to the south before it crosses Wyomissing Creek and enters the borough of Shillington, where it narrows to a two-lane undivided road past homes and some businesses that runs east-southeast. US 222 Bus. splits from PA 724 by continuing northeast on Lancaster Avenue, a three-lane road with a center left-turn lane that passes through residential areas with some commercial establishments, heading to the north of Governor Mifflin Senior High School.

The route forms the border between Shillington to the northwest and Cumru Township to the southeast, passing between shopping centers to the south and neighborhoods to the north, before it fully enters Cumru Township and runs through the community of Clover Park. US 222 Bus. becomes a four-lane undivided road and continues through residential and business areas as it forms the border between the city of Reading to the northwest and the borough of Kenhorst to the southeast, fully entering Reading at the Kenhorst Boulevard intersection. The road continues northeast and reaches an intersection with the northern terminus of PA 625. Past this intersection, the route passes under Norfolk Southern's Harrisburg Line #1 and continues through urban areas of homes and businesses. US 222 Bus. curves north and intersects the northern terminus of PA 10 and passes under the Schuylkill River Trail before it reaches an interchange with the US 422 freeway (West Shore Bypass).

Past this interchange, US 222 Bus. becomes Bingaman Street and passes over the Schuylkill River, Norfolk Southern's Reading Industrial Track, and Canal Street. After the bridge, the business route splits into a one-way pair, with the northbound direction following one-way, three-lane Laurel Street east and South 5th Street, a two-way road with two northbound lanes and one southbound lane, north while the southbound direction runs west along one-way, one-lane Spruce Street and south along one-way, two-lane South 4th Street. This one-way pairing passes through urban neighborhoods. Both directions of US 222 Bus. rejoin and the route continues north on South 5th Street, a three-lane road with two northbound lanes and one southbound lane. The road passes more urban homes before heading into the commercial downtown of Reading, where it intersects the eastbound direction of US 422 Bus. at Franklin Street.

After this, the route widens to four lanes and comes to the Penn Street intersection, where the name changes to North 5th Street. US 222 Bus. crosses the westbound direction of US 422 Bus. at Washington Street and heads out of the downtown area, continuing past urban rowhouses as a three-lane road with two northbound lanes and one southbound lane. The route intersects the beginning of one-way northbound Centre Avenue, which leads to PA 61, and comes to a bridge over Norfolk Southern's Harrisburg Line #2 before it has a junction with the southern terminus of PA 61 at Greenwich Street. The road narrows to two lanes and continues north, lined with homes. The route passes between a large cemetery to the west and neighborhoods to the east before it widens to four lanes and heads into commercial areas. US 222 Bus. passes under Norfolk Southern's Pottsville Branch and widens into a divided highway, leaving Reading for Muhlenberg Township as it comes to an interchange with the PA 12 freeway (Warren Street Bypass).

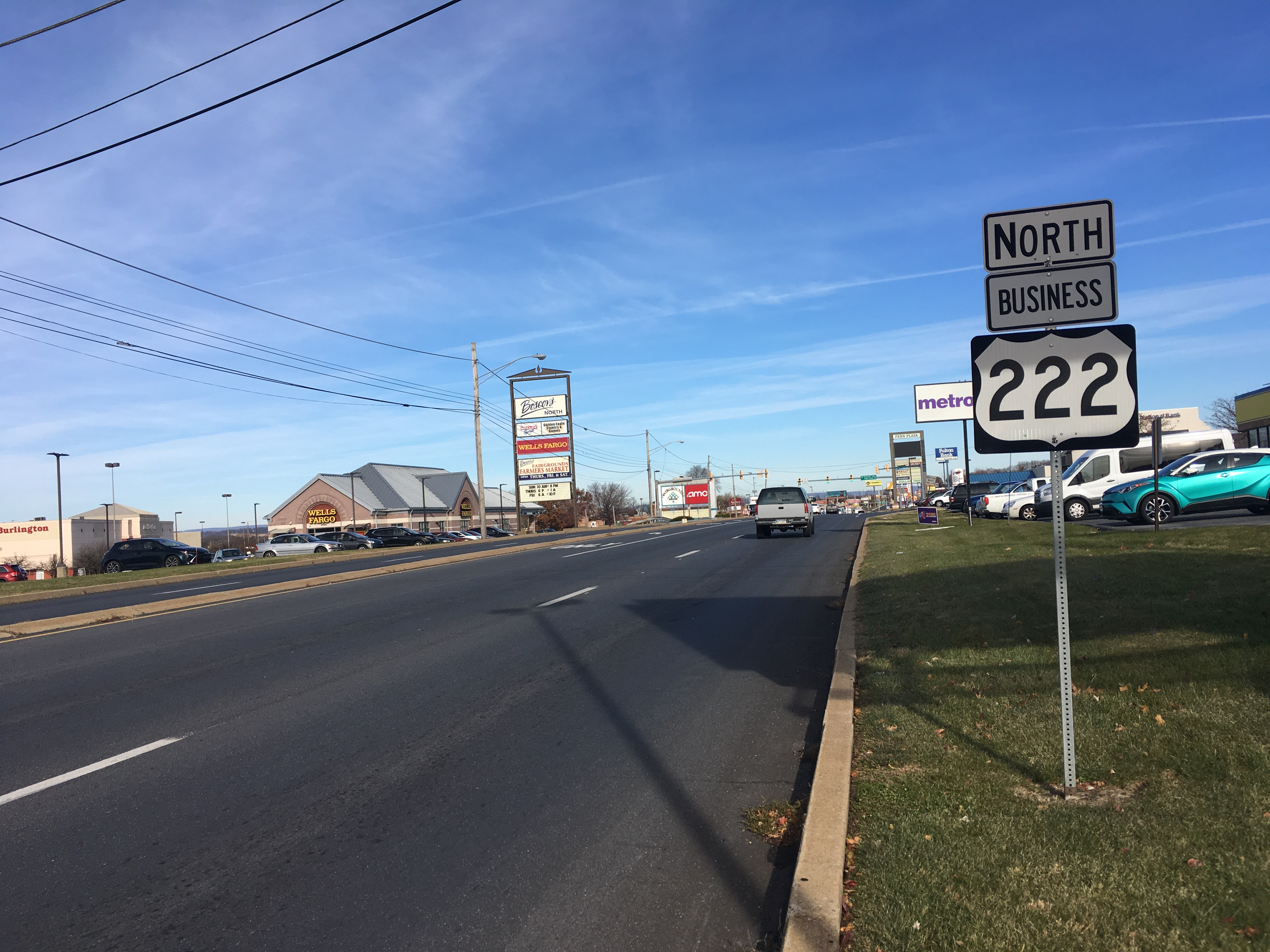
US 222 Bus. northbound on 5th Street Highway in Muhlenberg Township

After the PA 12 interchange, the business route continues north as a four-lane divided highway called North 5th Street Highway through a mix of residential and commercial areas in the community of Hyde Villa. US 222 Bus. heads past multiple shopping centers and passes to the east of the former Fairgrounds Square Mall, transitioning into a five-lane road with a center left-turn lane. The road heads to the west of the borough of Laureldale and passes between a lake to the west and Muhlenberg High School to the east. The route runs past more businesses and narrows to a three-lane road with a center left-turn lane as it passes to the west of the community of South Temple.

US 222 Bus. curves northeast as Allentown Pike at the Tuckerton Road/Tuckerton Avenue intersection near the community of Cherokee Ranch and heads northeast through suburban residential areas in Temple. The road passes between businesses to the northwest and homes to the southeast before it continues through commercial areas as a four-lane road with two northbound lanes, one southbound lane, and a center left-turn lane.

The route curves north and narrows to three lanes with a center left-turn lane, running between farmland to the west and woods to the east as it continues into Ontelaunee Township. The business route passes near a few homes and businesses before it widens into a four-lane divided highway and crosses under Norfolk Southern's Reading Line. US 222 Bus. reaches its northern terminus at a trumpet interchange with the end of the US 222 freeway bypass of Reading, at which point Allentown Pike continues north as US 222.

== History ==
When Pennsylvania first legislated routes in 1911, the route heading southwest out of Reading toward Lancaster was legislated as Legislative Route 148 while the route heading from Reading northeast toward Allentown was legislated as Legislative Route 157.

In 1916, the road between Reading and Allentown, became a part of the William Penn Highway, an auto trail that ran from Pittsburgh to New York City.

In 1924, the William Penn Highway was designated as PA 3 with the establishment of the first state route numbers in Pennsylvania. With the establishment of the U.S. Highway System in 1926, the route heading from Reading southwest to Lancaster was designated as US 222 while the route heading from Reading to Allentown along the William Penn Highway was designated as part of US 22, which ran concurrent with PA 3. In 1927, PA 41 was designated concurrent with US 222 between Lancaster and Reading and PA 42 ran north–south through downtown Reading.

A year later, the concurrent PA 41 designation along US 222 between Lancaster and Reading was replaced with PA 240. In addition, PA 73 ran concurrent with US 222/PA 240 between New Holland Avenue, where it split south, and downtown Reading.

By 1930, the concurrent PA 240 designation was removed from US 222 while the concurrent PA 3 designation was removed from US 22. At this time, US 222 entered Reading on Lancaster Avenue, where it became concurrent with PA 73 at New Holland Avenue and intersected the northern terminus of PA 42 at Morgantown Road. US 222/PA 73 crossed the Schuylkill River on Bingaman Street and intersected the southern terminus of US 120, which headed north on 4th Street and Center Street, and continued northeast to intersect PA 83 at 9th Street. Here, PA 73 continued northeast on Bingaman Street and US 222 turned north concurrent with PA 83 on 9th Street to reach its northern terminus at US 22 and US 422 at Penn Street. At this intersection, PA 83 turned west along with US 22 on Penn Street and US 22 continued north along 9th Street out of Reading, where it continued north through South Temple and Temple on Kutztown Road.

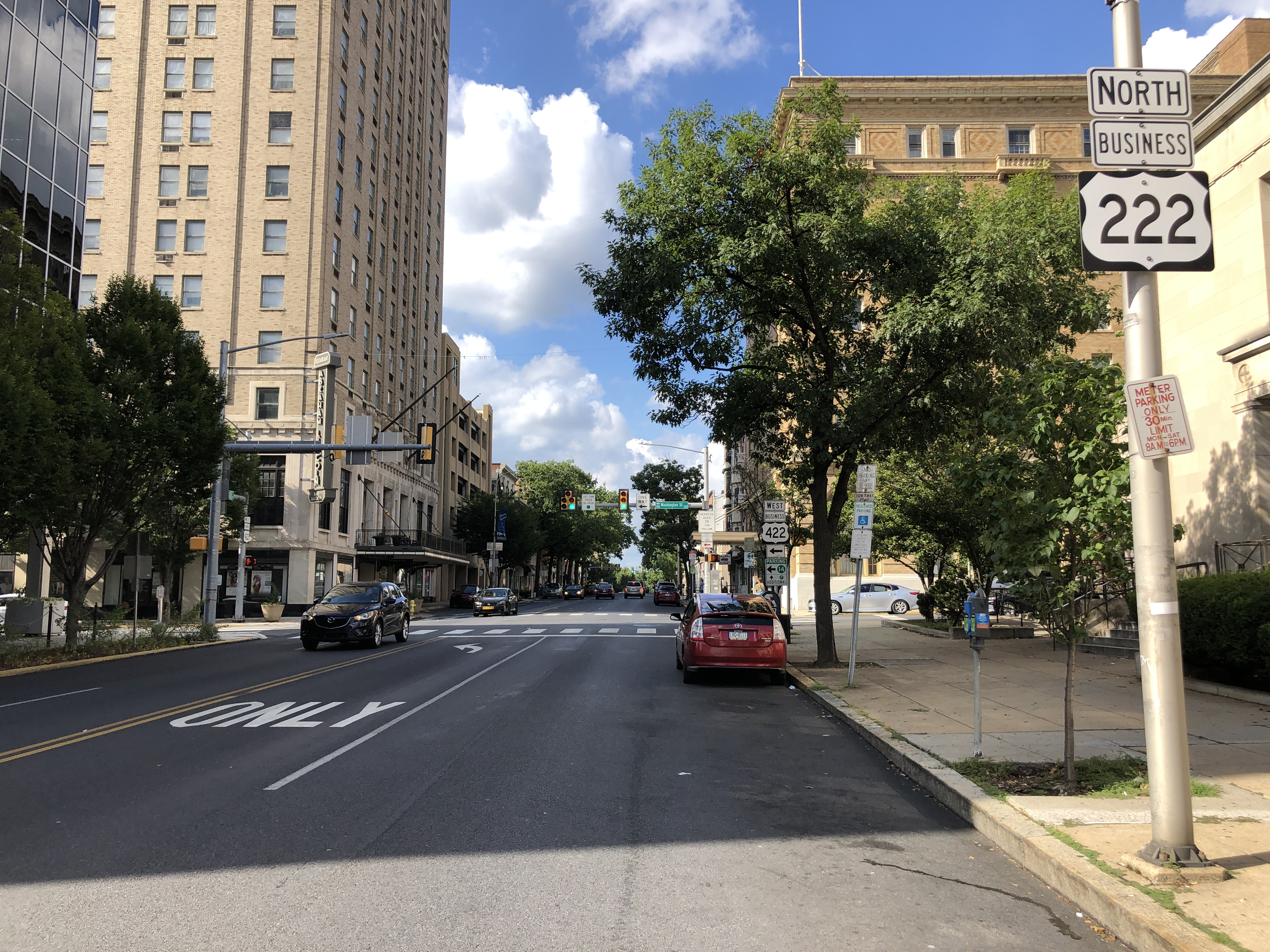
US 222 Bus. northbound at US 422 Bus. in Reading

In 1931, plans were made to reroute US 22 and the William Penn Highway to a more direct alignment between Harrisburg and Allentown by way of PA 43. As a result of the rerouting of US 22, the road between Harrisburg and Reading would become a western extension of US 422 while the road between Reading and Allentown would become a northern extension of US 222. The changes were approved by the American Association of State Highway Officials on June 8, 1931. Signs were changed to reflect the new designations on May 31, 1932, with the new route designations officially in place on June 1, 1932.

In the 1930s, US 222 was shifted to follow 5th Street north through Reading and 5th Street Highway through Muhlenberg Township. US 122 replaced the PA 42 designation south of Reading and the US 120 designation north of Reading and was routed to run concurrent with US 222 on Lancaster Avenue, Bingaman Street, and 5th Street between Morgantown Road and Center Street. In 1963, the US 122 concurrency was removed from US 222 in Reading as part of the elimination of US 122. By 1966, the PA 73 concurrency was removed from US 222 through Reading. US 222 was split into a one-way pair along 5th Street northbound and 4th Street southbound between Laurel and Chestnut streets.

On November 15, 1975, the American Association of State Highway and Transportation Officials (AASHTO) approved rerouting US 222 to bypass downtown Reading to the west along the limited-access West Shore Bypass (where it ran concurrent with US 422) and the Warren Street Bypass. As a result, US 222 Bus. was designated onto the former alignment of US 222 between US 222/US 422 (West Shore Bypass) and US 222 (Warren Street Bypass).

In October 1998, the Park Road Corridor was completed, and US 222 was rerouted to follow a new freeway alignment from the Warren Street Bypass northwest to Van Reed Road, where it turned northeast along what was called to the "Road to Nowhere" to end at its original alignment in Ontelanuee Township. As a result, US 222 Bus. was extended north from the Warren Street Bypass, which had been redesignated PA 12, to the north end of the US 222 freeway in Ontelanuee Township in December of that year. In 2004, the US 222 freeway was extended south from PA 724 to Grings Hill Road in Mohnton, and US 222 was rerouted south from Wyomissing along the Warren Street Bypass and the new freeway. As a result, US 222 Bus. was extended south from US 422 (West Shore Bypass) to its current southern terminus.

== Major intersections ==
The entire route is in Berks County.

| Location | mi | km | Destinations | Notes |
|---|---|---|---|---|
| Cumru Township | 0.000 | 0.000 | US 222 south – Lancaster | Interchange; access to southbound US 222 and from northbound US 222; southern terminus |
| Cumru Township | 1.390 | 2.237 | PA 724 west (Revere Boulevard) to US 222 north – Sinking Spring | Southern terminus of overlap |
| Shillington | 2.046 | 3.293 | PA 724 east (Philadelphia Avenue) – Birdsboro | Northern terminus of overlap |
| Reading | 3.813 | 6.136 | PA 625 south (New Holland Road) | Northern terminus of PA 625 |
| Reading | 4.409 | 7.096 | PA 10 south (Morgantown Road) – Green Hills | Northern terminus of PA 10; no access from northbound PA 10 to southbound US 222 Bus. |
| Reading | 4.443 | 7.150 | US 422 to I-176 – Lebanon, Allentown, Pottstown, Morgantown | Interchange |
| Reading | 5.276 | 8.491 | US 422 Bus. east (Franklin Street) – Mount Penn | |
| Reading | 5.503 | 8.856 | US 422 Bus. west (Washington Street) – West Reading | |
| Reading | 6.024 | 9.695 | PA 61 north (Greenwich Street) – Pottsville | Southern terminus of PA 61 |
| Muhlenberg Township | 7.900 | 12.714 | PA 12 (Warren Street Bypass) – Pricetown, Lebanon | Interchange |
| Ontelaunee Township | 12.173 | 19.591 | US 222 – Lancaster, Allentown | Interchange; northern terminus |
1.000 mi = 1.609 km; 1.000 km = 0.621 mi: Concurrency terminus; Incomplete access
