= OVHS =

OVHS may refer to:

- Ocean View High School
- Ocean View Hills School
- Orchard View High School
- Owen Valley Community High School
- Oley Valley High School
