= Greater Reading Expo Center =

Coordinates: 40.37368°N 75.91402°W

- Interactive map of Greater Reading Expo Center
- Address: 2525 N. 12th Street Reading, Pennsylvania 19605
- Location: Muhlenberg Township, Berks County, Pennsylvania

Construction
- Opened: 2006
- Closed: 2013

The Greater Reading Expo Center was an exhibition center located just north of Reading, Pennsylvania and access from the Warren Street Bypass (Route 12.) It had 30 meeting rooms, two food courts, and a total area of over 270,000 square feet on one floor. The expo center opened in 2006 and closed in 2013.
