= Oley Valley School District =

School district in Berks County, Pennsylvania

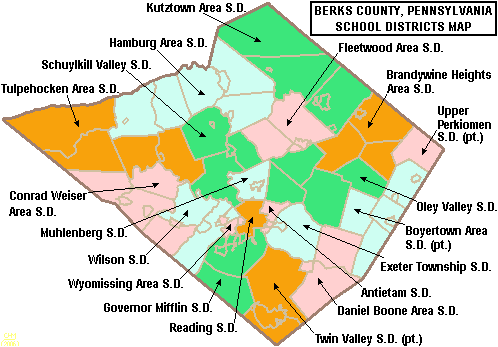

Location
- Oley, Pennsylvania; Berks County United States

District information
- Motto: Enter to learn, Leave to Serve.
- Grades: K-12
- Superintendent: Tracy S. Shank

Students and staff
- Students: 1245
- Teachers: 161
- Staff: 122

Other information
- Website: Oley Valley School District

Oley Valley School District is a school district located in Berks County, Pennsylvania. It serves the townships of Alsace, Oley, Pike, and Ruscombmanor.

== Schools ==
- Oley Valley Elementary School
- Oley Valley Middle School
- Oley Valley High School
