= Ruth Kramer =

American baseball player

- Infielder
- Born: April 26, 1926; Limekiln, Pennsylvania, U.S.
- Died: November 9, 2015 (aged 89); Reading, Pennsylvania, U.S.
- Batted: Right Threw: Right
- Stats at Baseball Reference

Teams
- Racine Belles (1946); Fort Wayne Daisies (1946–1947)

Career highlights and awards
- Women in Baseball – AAGPBL Permanent Display at the Baseball Hall of Fame and Museum (since 1988)

Ruth Kramer Hartman (April 26, 1926 – November 9, 2015) was an American pitcher and backup infielder who played in the All-American Girls Professional Baseball League (AAGPBL). Listed at 5' 1", 150 lb, she batted and threw right handed.

Kramer was born in Limekiln, Pennsylvania. She received an opportunity to pitch in the league when she was a sophomore in college. Kramer joined the Racine Belles in 1946, then moved to the Fort Wayne Daisies for the rest of the year through the 1947 season.

Most of her time in the league, Kramer pitched batting practice and in short relief situations. Eventually, she was used only as a skilled bunter or a defensive replacement at second base.

Kramer married William D. L. Hartman. They had a daughter, Karen.

Considered a pioneer for women's athletics in Reading, Kramer earned a physical education degree from East Stroudsburg State College in Pennsylvania, now East Stroudsburg University, and worked for the Reading School District for 36 years. In between, she started a girls’ softball program at Reading Senior High School, where she coached with great success during 16 years.

The All-American Girls Professional Baseball League folded in 1954, but there is now a permanent display at the Baseball Hall of Fame and Museum at Cooperstown, New York, since November 5, 1988, that honors those who were part of the league. Ruth, along with the rest of the girls and the league staff, is included at the display/exhibit.

Ruth Kramer Hartman died in 2015 in Reading, Pennsylvania, at the age of 89.
