= Oley Township, Pennsylvania =

Township in Pennsylvania, US

Oley Township
- Township
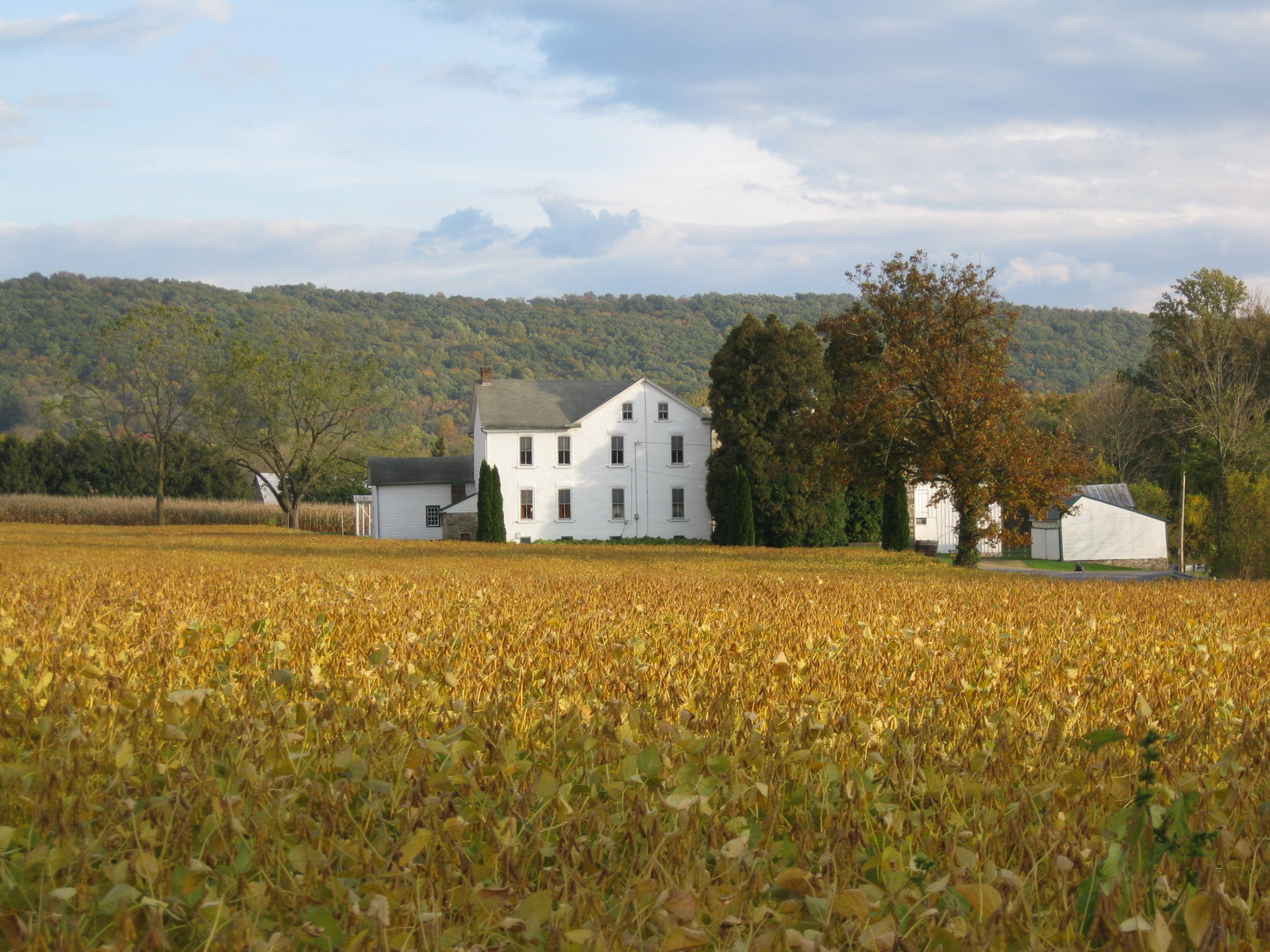
- A farm in Oley Township, October 2019

- Location of Oley Township in Pennsylvania Oley Township (the United States)
- Coordinates: 40°23′00″N 75°46′15″W
- Country: United States
- State: Pennsylvania
- County: Berks

Area
  - Total: 24.09 sq mi (62.39 km^{2})
  - Land: 23.88 sq mi (61.84 km^{2})
  - Water: 0.21 sq mi (0.54 km^{2})
- Elevation: 371 ft (113 m)

Population (2010)
  - Total: 3,620
  - Estimate (2016): 3,740
  - Density: 156.6/sq mi (60.48/km^{2})
- Time zone: UTC-5 (EST)
  - Summer (DST): UTC-4 (EDT)
- Area code: 610
- FIPS code: 42-011-56672
- Website
- Oley Township Historic District
- U.S. National Register of Historic Places
- U.S. Historic district
- Location: PA 73, Oley Township, Pennsylvania
- Coordinates: 40°22′7″N 75°46′17″W
- Area: 15,065 acres (6,097 ha)
- Architect: Multiple
- Architectural style: Late Victorian, Georgian, Germanic style
- NRHP reference No.: 83002218
- Added to NRHP: March 11, 1983

Oley Township is a township in Berks County, Pennsylvania, United States. As of the 2010 census, the township had a population of 3,620. Oley Township was originally formed in 1740 as a part of Philadelphia County, before Berks County was formed in 1752. The entire township was listed as a historic district by the National Register of Historic Places in 1983. Oley is a Native American name purported to mean "a hollow". Daniel Boone was born in Oley Township November 2, 1734.

== Geography ==
According to the U.S. Census Bureau, the township has a total area of 24.2 square miles (62.7 km^{2}), all land. It is drained by the Schuylkill River via its tributaries of the Manatawny Creek and Monocacy Creek. The township's villages include Limekiln (also in Exeter Township), Oley, Oley Furnace, Pleasantville, Spangsville, and Yellow House (also in Amity Township).

Adjacent townships

- Rockland Township (north)
- Pike Township (northeast)
- Earl Township (east)
- Amity Township (southeast)
- Exeter Township (southwest)
- Alsace Township (west)
- Ruscombmanor Township (northwest)

== Transportation ==
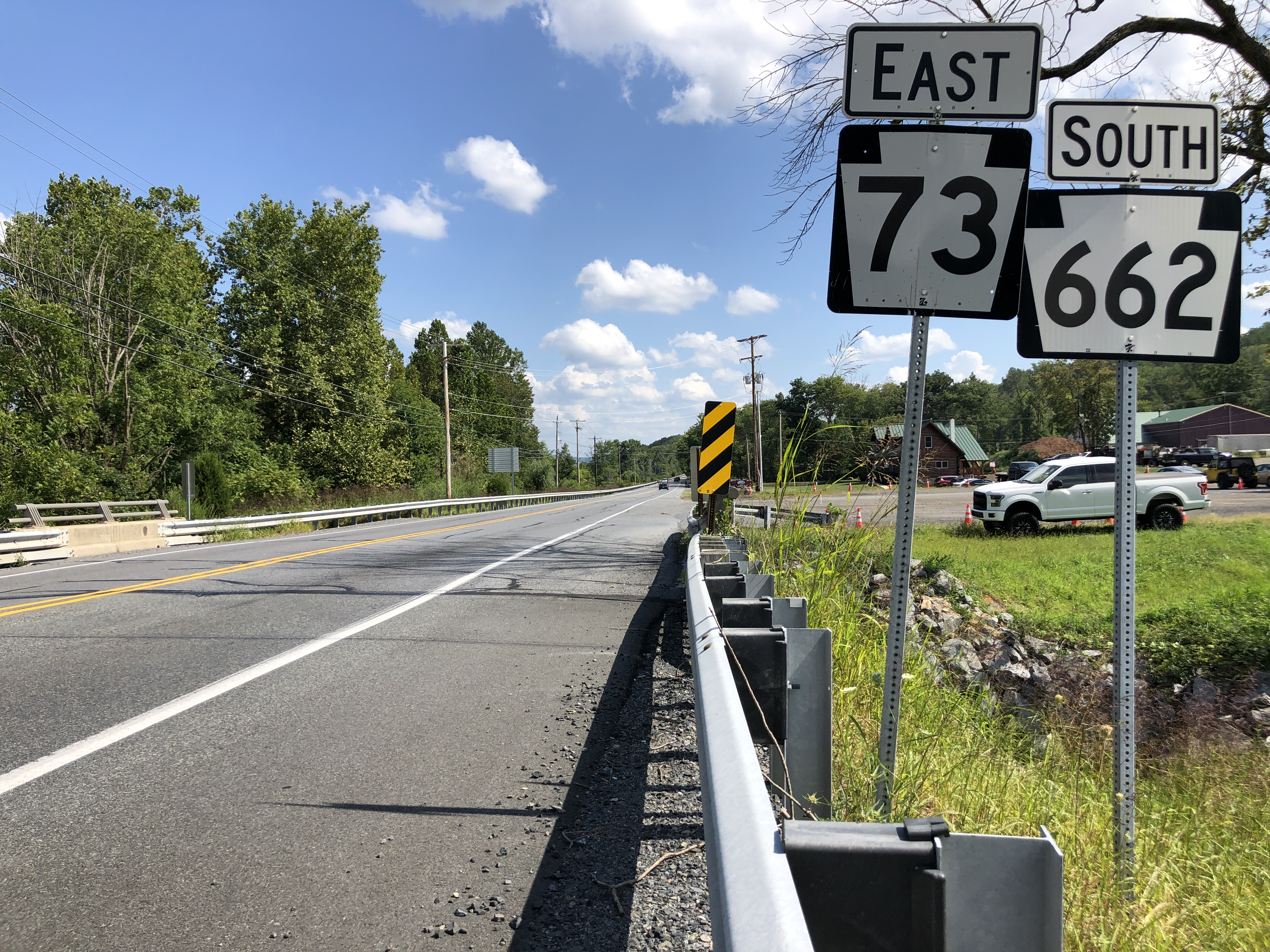
PA 73 eastbound and PA 662 southbound in Oley Township

As of 2019, there were 76.57 miles (123.23 km) of public roads in Oley Township, of which 25.70 miles (41.36 km) were maintained by the Pennsylvania Department of Transportation (PennDOT) and 50.87 miles (81.87 km) were maintained by the township.

Numbered highways serving Oley Township include Pennsylvania Route 73, Pennsylvania Route 562 and Pennsylvania Route 662. PA 73 follows an east-west alignment across the northern portion of the township. PA 562 follows Boyertown Pike along an east-west alignment on the southern edge of the township. Finally, PA 662 follows Memorial Highway along a northwest-southeast alignment through the center of the township, including a concurrency with PA 73 in the northwestern part of the township.

== Demographics ==
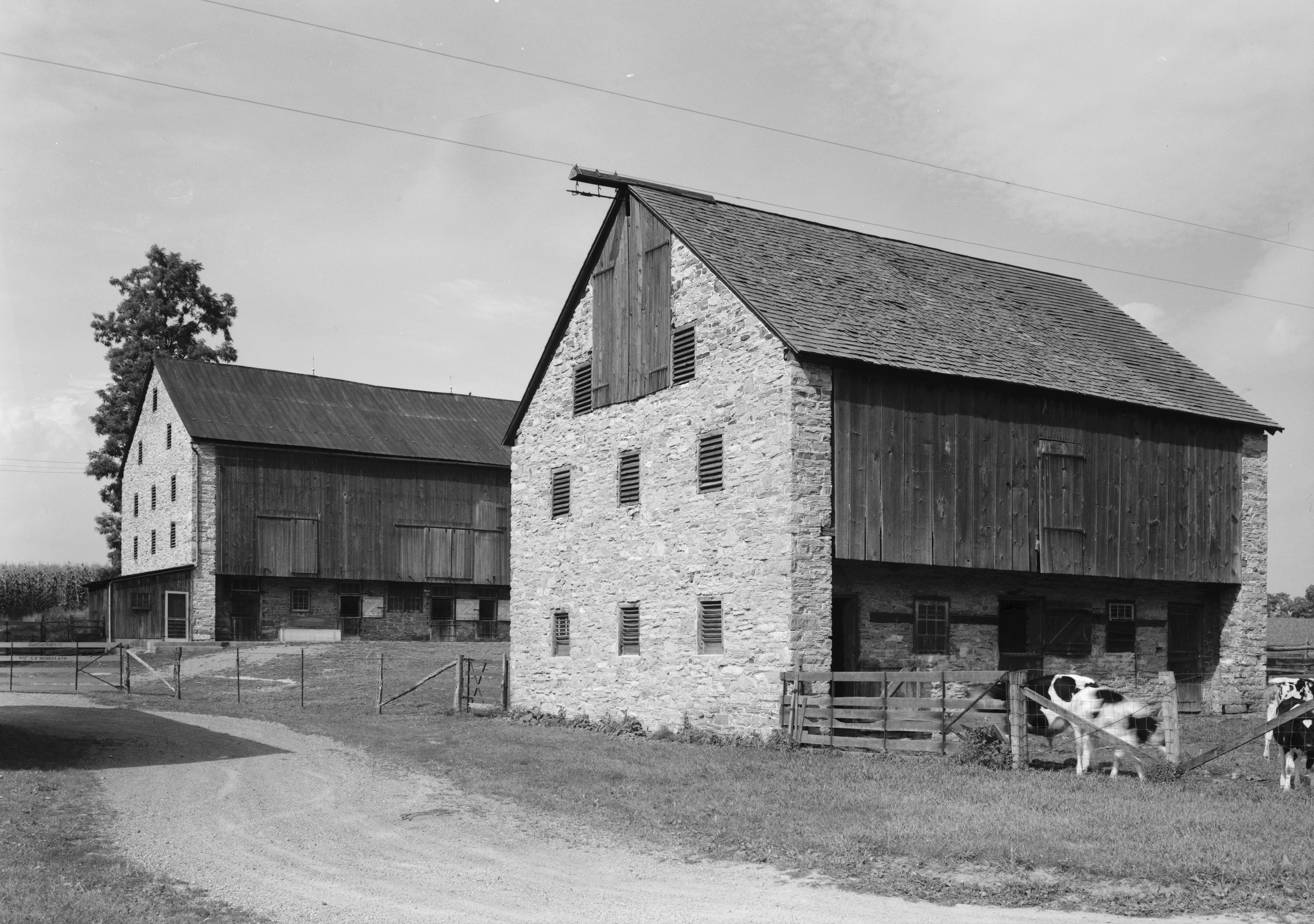
Kaufman barns

As of the census of 2000, there were 3,583 people, 1,382 households, and 1,029 families residing in the township. The population density was 148.1 inhabitants per square mile (57.2/km^{2}). There were 1,425 housing units at an average density of 58.9 per square mile (22.7/km^{2}).

The racial makeup of the township was 98.66% White, 0.14% African American, 0.03% Native American, 0.28% Asian, 0.20% from other races, and 0.70% from two or more races. Hispanic or Latino of any race were 0.98% of the population.

Historical population
Census	Pop.	Note	%±
1980	3,024		—
1990	3,362		11.2%
2000	3,583		6.6%
2010	3,620		1.0%
2016 (est.)	3,740		3.3%
Source: US Census Bureau

There were 1,382 households, out of which 33.1% had children under the age of 18 living with them, 62.8% were married couples living together, 7.5% had a female householder with no husband present, and 25.5% were non-families. 19.8% of all households were made up of individuals, and 8.0% had someone living alone who was 65 years of age or older. The average household size was 2.58 and the average family size was 3.00.

In the township, the population was spread out, with 23.7% under the age of 18, 6.9% from 18 to 24, 30.8% from 25 to 44, 24.4% from 45 to 64, and 14.2% who were 65 years of age or older. The median age was 39 years. For every 100 females, there were 99.6 males. For every 100 females age 18 and over, there were 96.8 males.

The median income for a household in the township was $52,151, and the median income for a family was $58,045. Males had a median income of $40,882 versus $27,795 for females. The per capita income for the township was $21,565. About 0.9% of families and 2.0% of the population were below the poverty line, including none of those under age 18 and 4.8% of those age 65 or over.

== Gallery ==
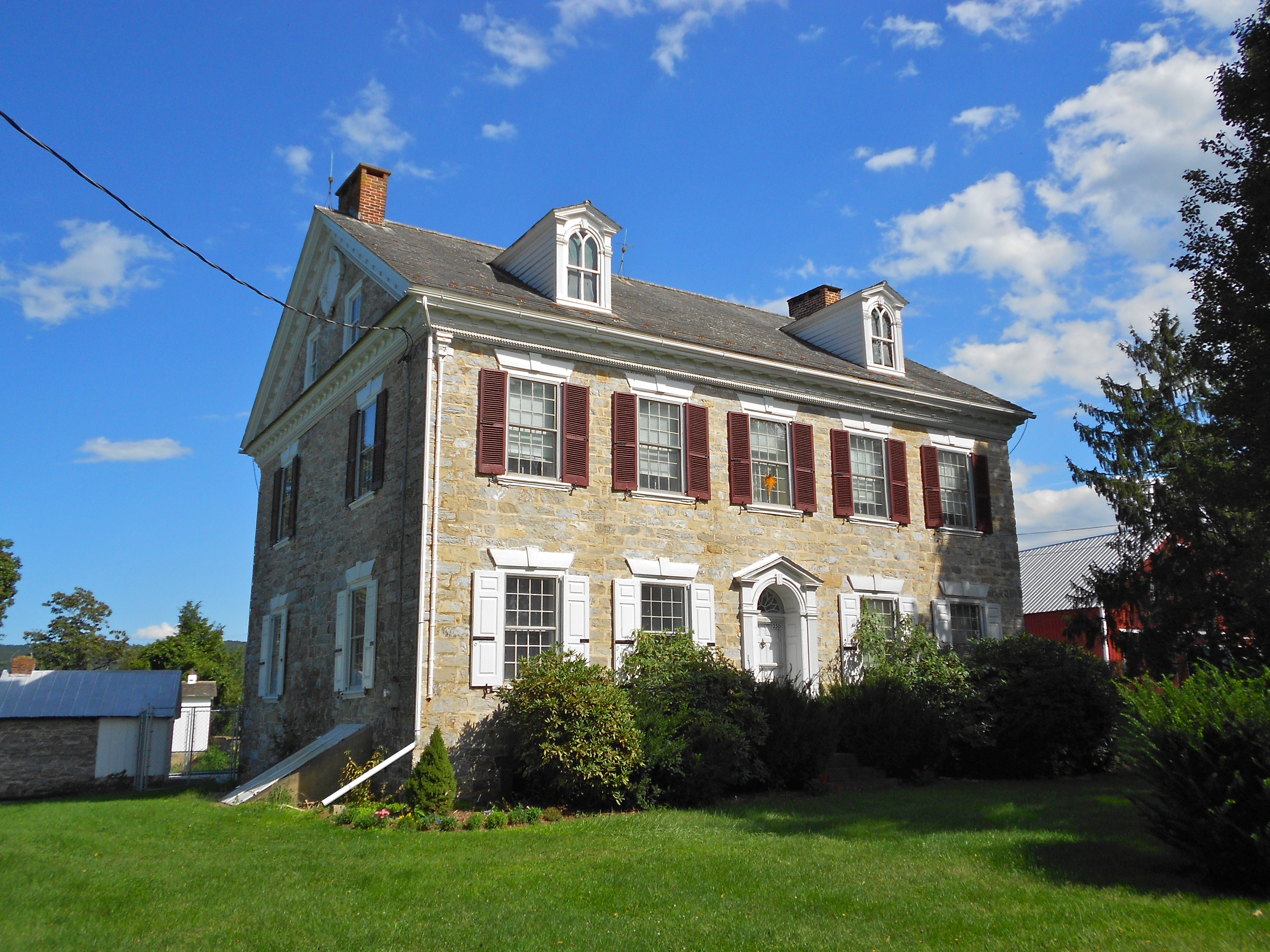
Henry Fisher House

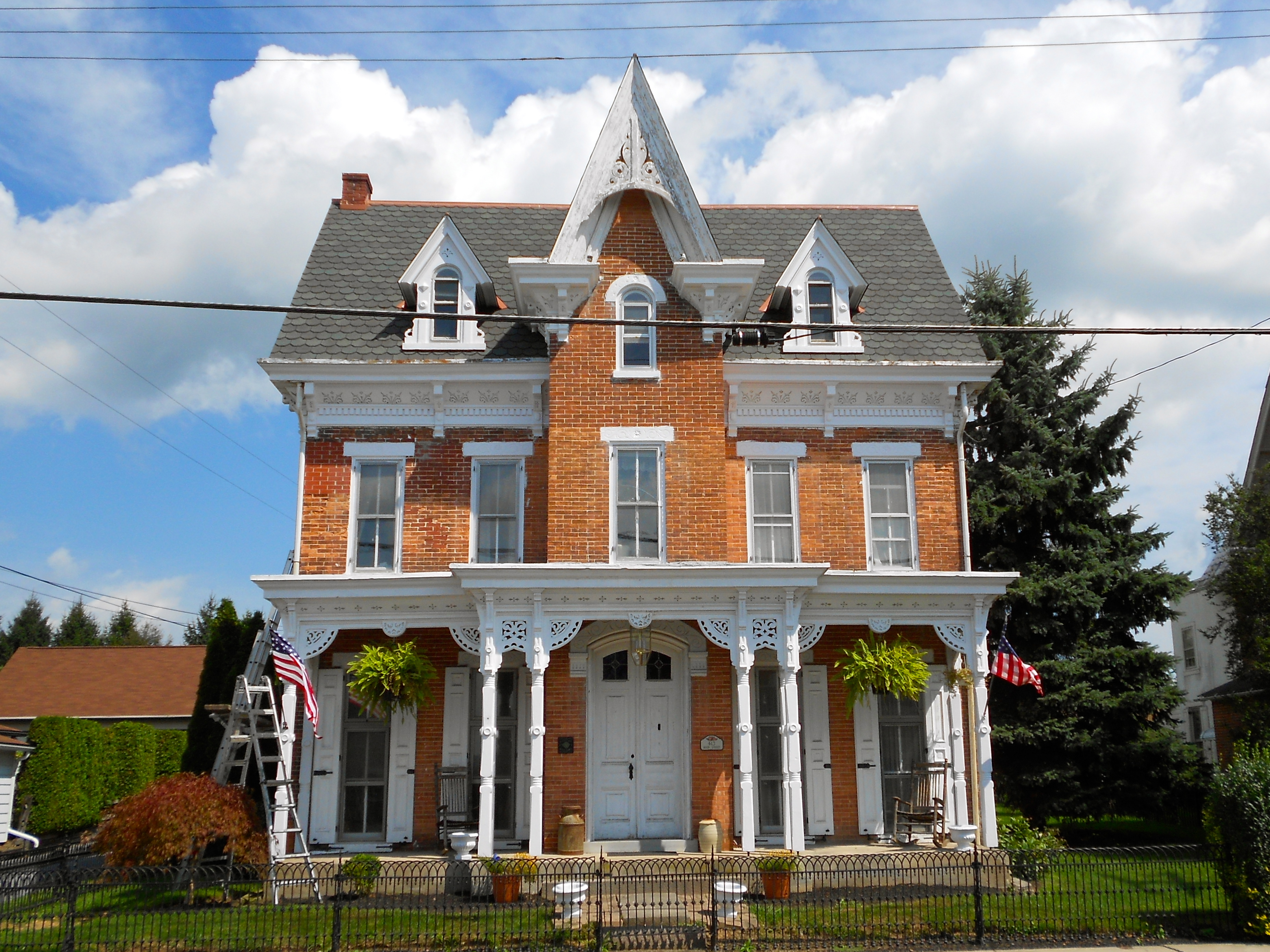
House on Main Street in Oley Village

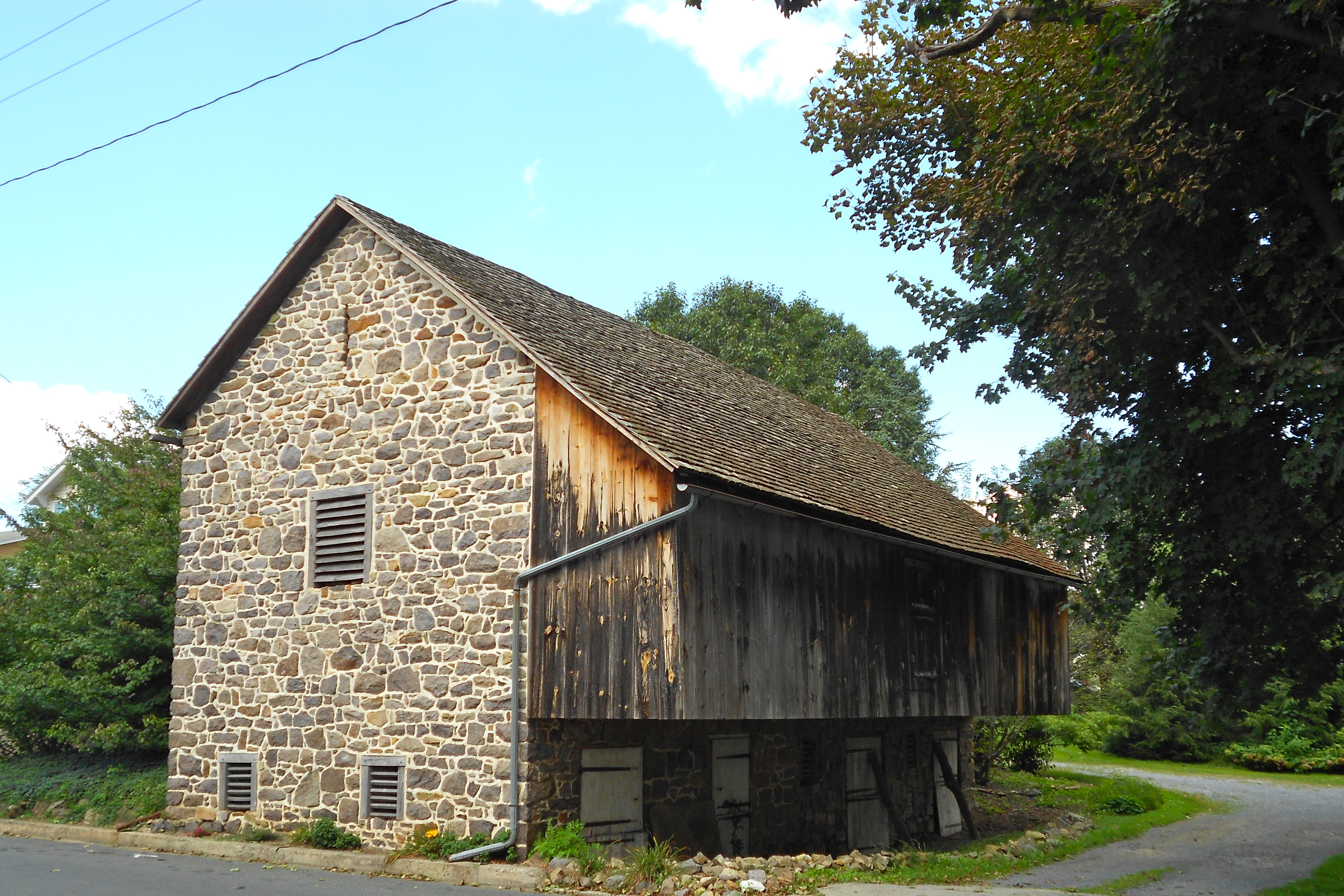
Barn on Main Street in Oley Village

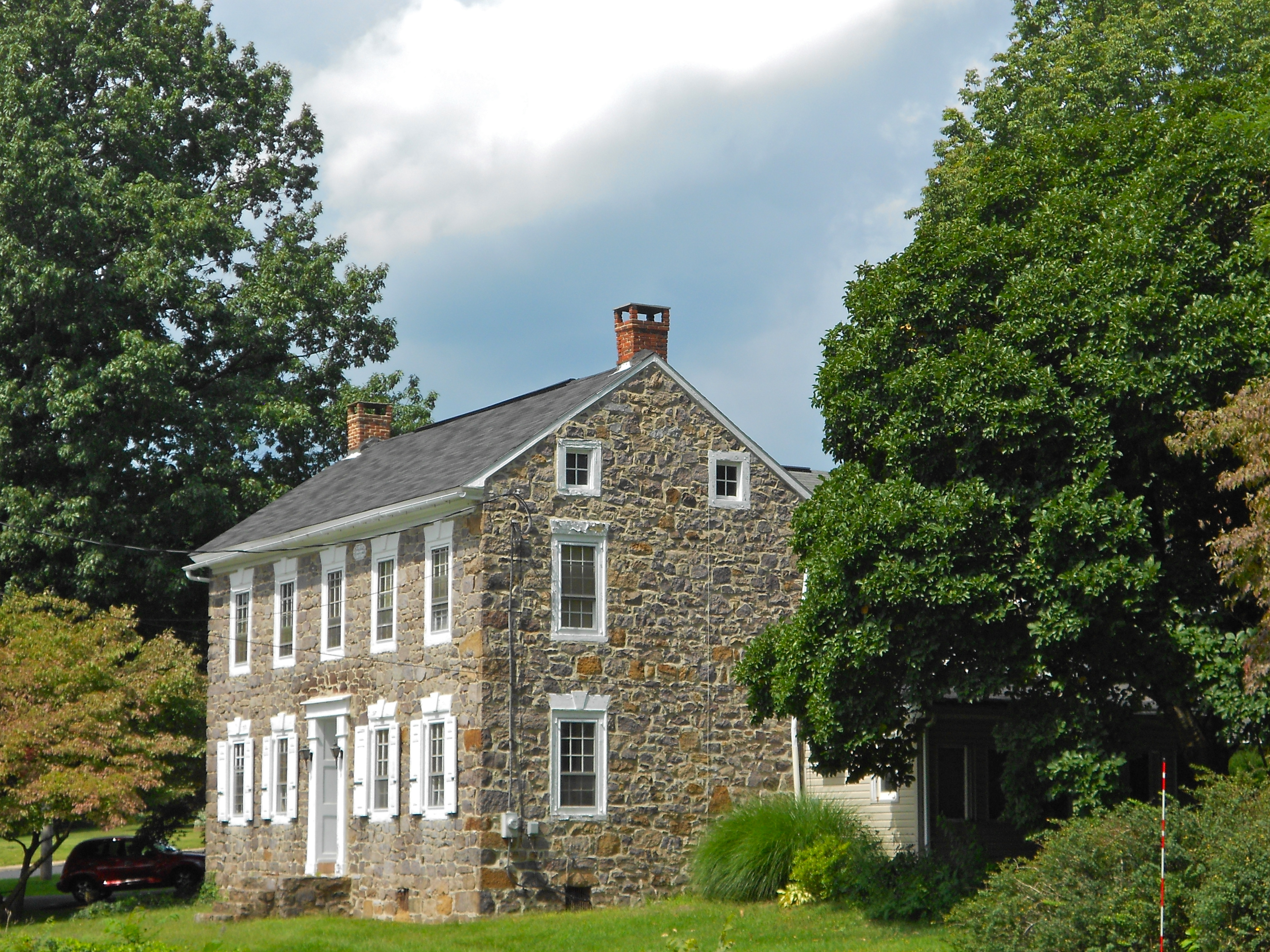
Milloth House in Oley Village

== See also ==
- Oley Valley
- Oley Valley High School
