= Pricetown, Pennsylvania =

Unincorporated community in Pennsylvania, US

- Unincorporated community
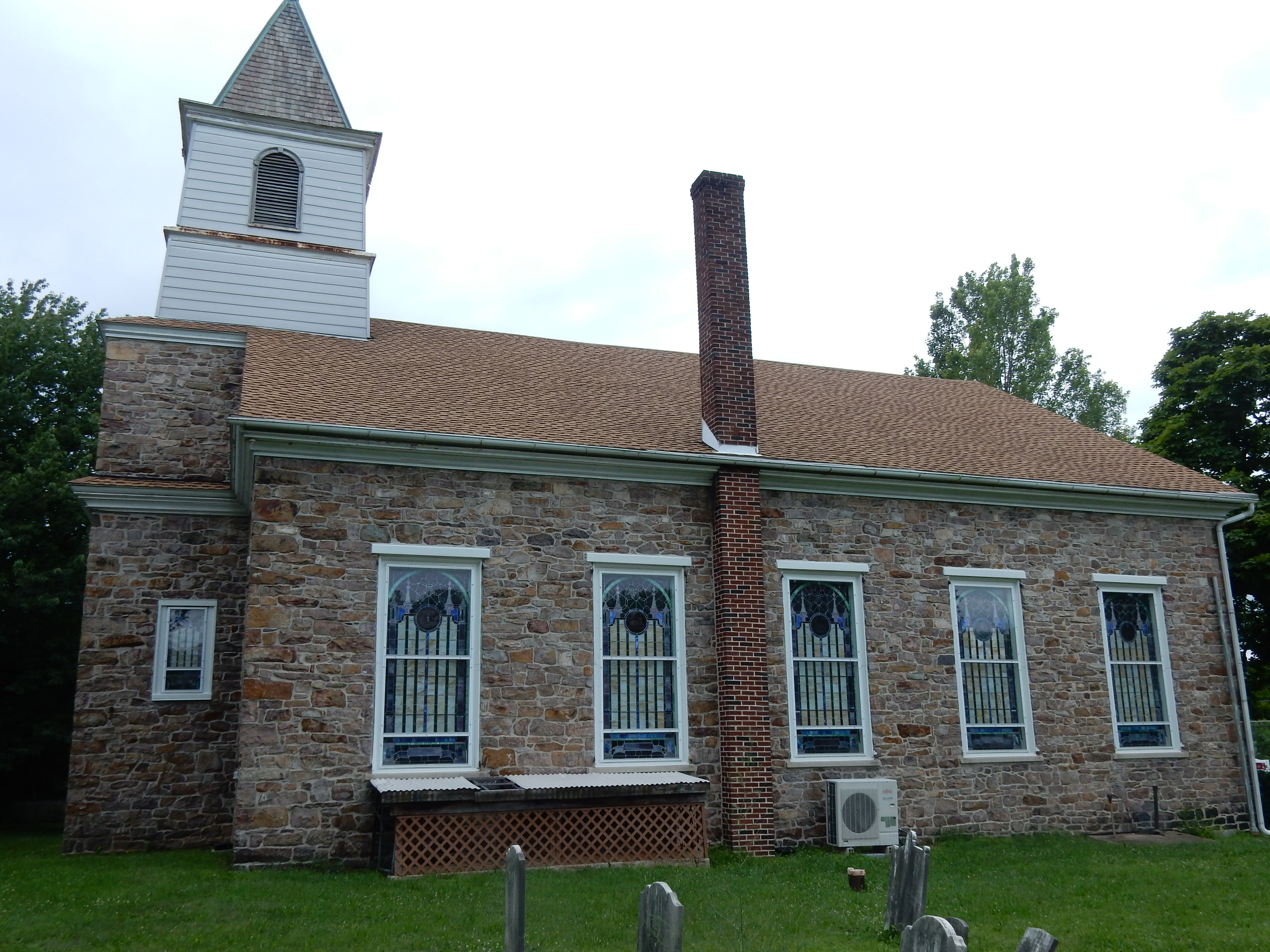
- St. John's UCC in Pricetown in June 2015

- Location within Pennsylvania Location within the United States
- Coordinates: 40°25′36″N 75°49′19″W
- Country: United States
- State: Pennsylvania
- County: Berks
- Township: Ruscombmanor
- Elevation: 837 ft (255 m)
- Time zone: UTC-5 (Eastern (EST))
  - Summer (DST): UTC-4 (EDT)
- ZIP code: 19522
- Area codes: 610 and 484
- GNIS feature ID: 1184412

Pricetown is a village in Ruscombmanor Township, Pennsylvania, United States, in Berks County. It is 10 miles from downtown Reading at the intersection of Pennsylvania Route 12 and Pennsylvania Route 662, and is served by the Oley Valley School District.
