= Pennsylvania Route 662 =

State highway in Berks County, Pennsylvania, US

Pennsylvania Route 662

Route information
- Maintained by PennDOT
- Length: 26.171 mi (42.118 km)
- Existed: 1930–present

Major junctions
- South end: US 422 in Douglassville
- PA 562 in Yellow House; PA 73 in Oley; PA 12 in Pricetown; US 222 in Moselem Springs; PA 143 in Richmond Township
- North end: PA 61 in Shoemakersville

Location
- Country: United States
- State: Pennsylvania
- Counties: Berks

Highway system
- Pennsylvania State Route System; Interstate; US; State; Scenic; Legislative
| ← PA 660 | → PA 663 |

Pennsylvania Route 662 (PA 662) is a 26.17-mile-long (42.12 km) state highway located in Berks County in eastern Pennsylvania. Its southern terminus is at U.S. Route 422 (US 422) in Douglassville and its northern terminus is at PA 61 in Shoemakersville. The route is a two-lane undivided road its entire length and passes through rural areas. PA 662 heads north from Douglassville, intersecting PA 562 in Yellow House before becoming concurrent with PA 73 northwest through Oley. From here, PA 662 continues north and meets PA 12 in Pricetown before passing through the borough of Fleetwood and coming to a junction with US 222 in Moselem Springs. After this, the route continues west and intersects PA 143 before reaching its terminus at PA 61.

Between 1859 and 1897, the portion of road between Douglassville and Yellow House was a turnpike known as the Douglassville and Yellow House Turnpike. PA 662 was first designated by 1930 between US 422 in Douglassville and PA 562 in Amityville. In the 1930s, the route was extended north to US 122 (now PA 61) in Shoemakersville, replacing a part of PA 562 between Amityville and Yellow House. By 1966, PA 662 was realigned to its current alignment concurrent with PA 73 through Oley.

== Route description ==
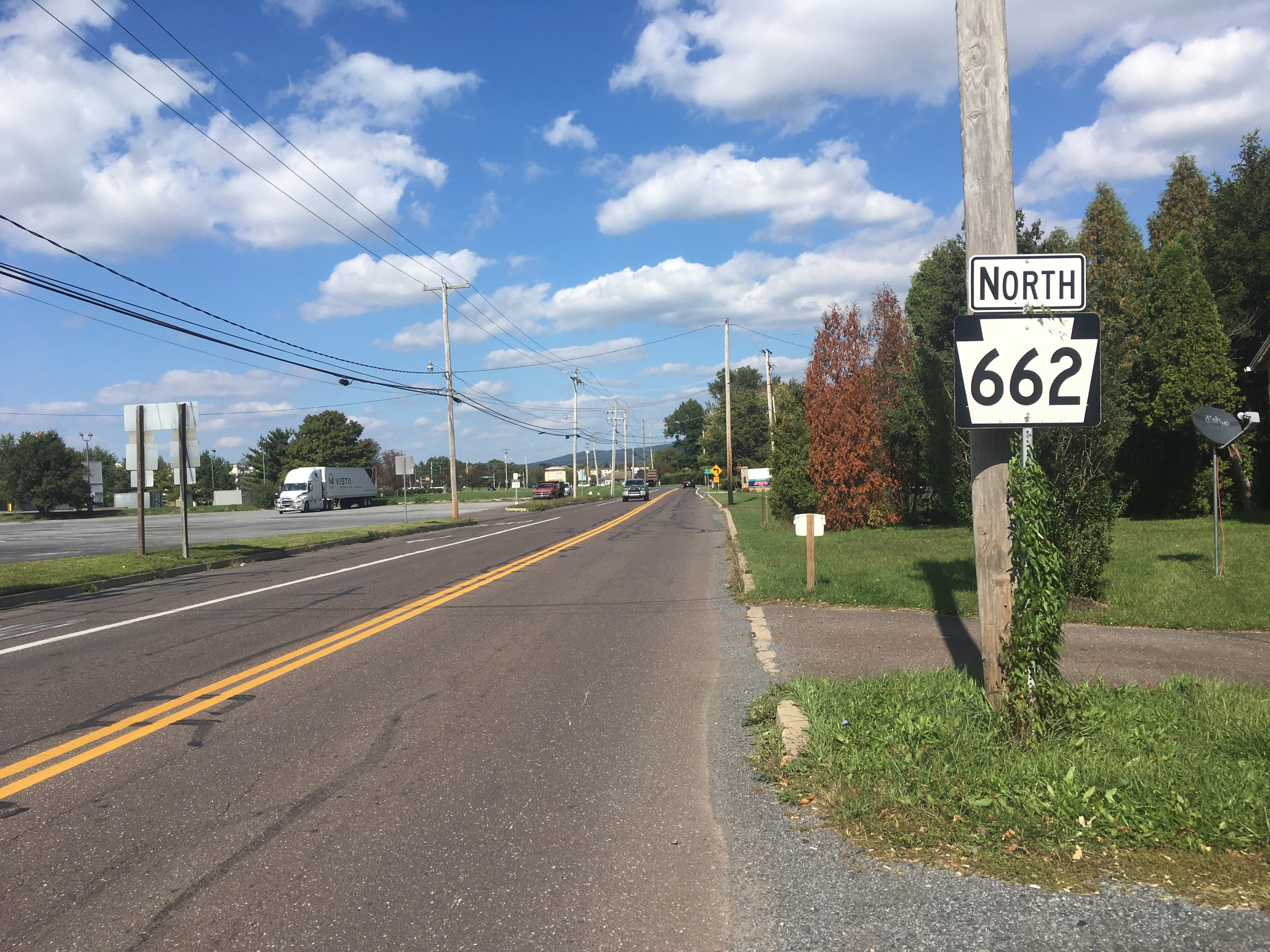
PA 662 northbound past southern terminus at US 422 in Douglassville

PA 662 begins at an intersection with US 422 in the community of Douglassville in Amity Township, Berks County. The road heads to the north on two-lane undivided Old Swede Road, passing residential neighborhoods in the community of Amity Gardens to the west and industrial development to the east. The route passes more homes as it turns northwest and passes through the community of Amityville. Past Amityville, PA 662 enters more agricultural surroundings with a few residences. In Yellow House, the road crosses PA 562 and enters Oley Township, where the name of the road becomes Memorial Highway. The route heads north-northwest through farmland in the Oley Valley region before reaching a roundabout with PA 73 in the community of Oley. At this point, PA 662 forms a concurrency with PA 73 by turning northwest onto that road, with the name remaining Memorial Highway. The two routes pass a few businesses in Oley, bypassing the residential center of the community to the southwest, before heading into areas of farms and woods.

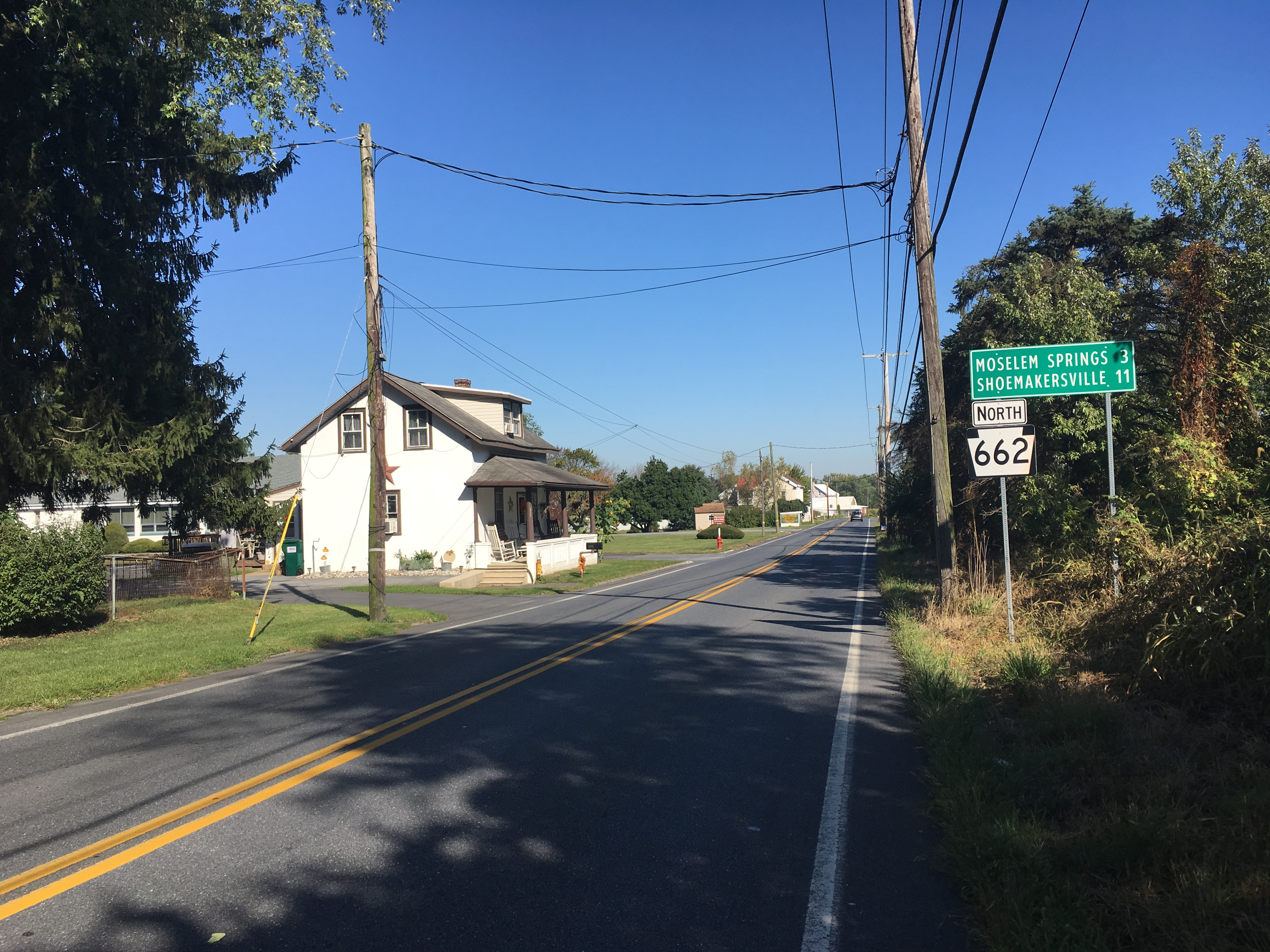
PA 662 northbound leaving Fleetwood

The road crosses into Ruscombmanor Township before PA 662 splits from PA 73 at a roundabout by making a turn to the northeast to remain along Memorial Highway. A short distance later, the route makes a northwest turn. The road leaves the Oley Valley and heads northwest and then north over a wooded mountain prior to coming to the community of Pricetown. In this area, the road passes a few homes and businesses at the intersection with the eastern terminus of PA 12.

Past this area, PA 662 crosses over wooded South Mountain, where there are several homes. After crossing the mountain, the route heads north into the borough of Fleetwood, where it becomes South Richmond Street and passes through residential areas. After crossing Norfolk Southern's Reading Line at-grade, the route turns east onto West Main Street and enters the commercial downtown of Fleetwood. A short distance later, PA 662 turns north onto North Franklin Street, passing more homes. The road leaves Fleetwood for Richmond Township, at which point the name becomes Moselem Springs Road. PA 662 heads northwest through agricultural areas prior to reaching a roundabout with US 222 near businesses in the community of Moselem Springs.

Following the roundabout at US 222, the route heads through more farmland prior to passing a golf course and reaching an intersection with the southern terminus of PA 143. At this point, PA 662 turns west into woodland, crossing the Maiden Creek into Perry Township. Upon entering Perry Township, the road heads into farmland, passing through a sharp S-curve to the north and west. After this, the route makes another sharp turn to the north before a sharp turn to the west. PA 662 passes through agricultural areas with some homes before coming to its northern terminus at PA 61 on the eastern border of the borough of Shoemakersville. Past this intersection, the road continues west into Shoemakersville as East Noble Avenue, which is designated as a quadrant route numbered State Route 4025.

== History ==
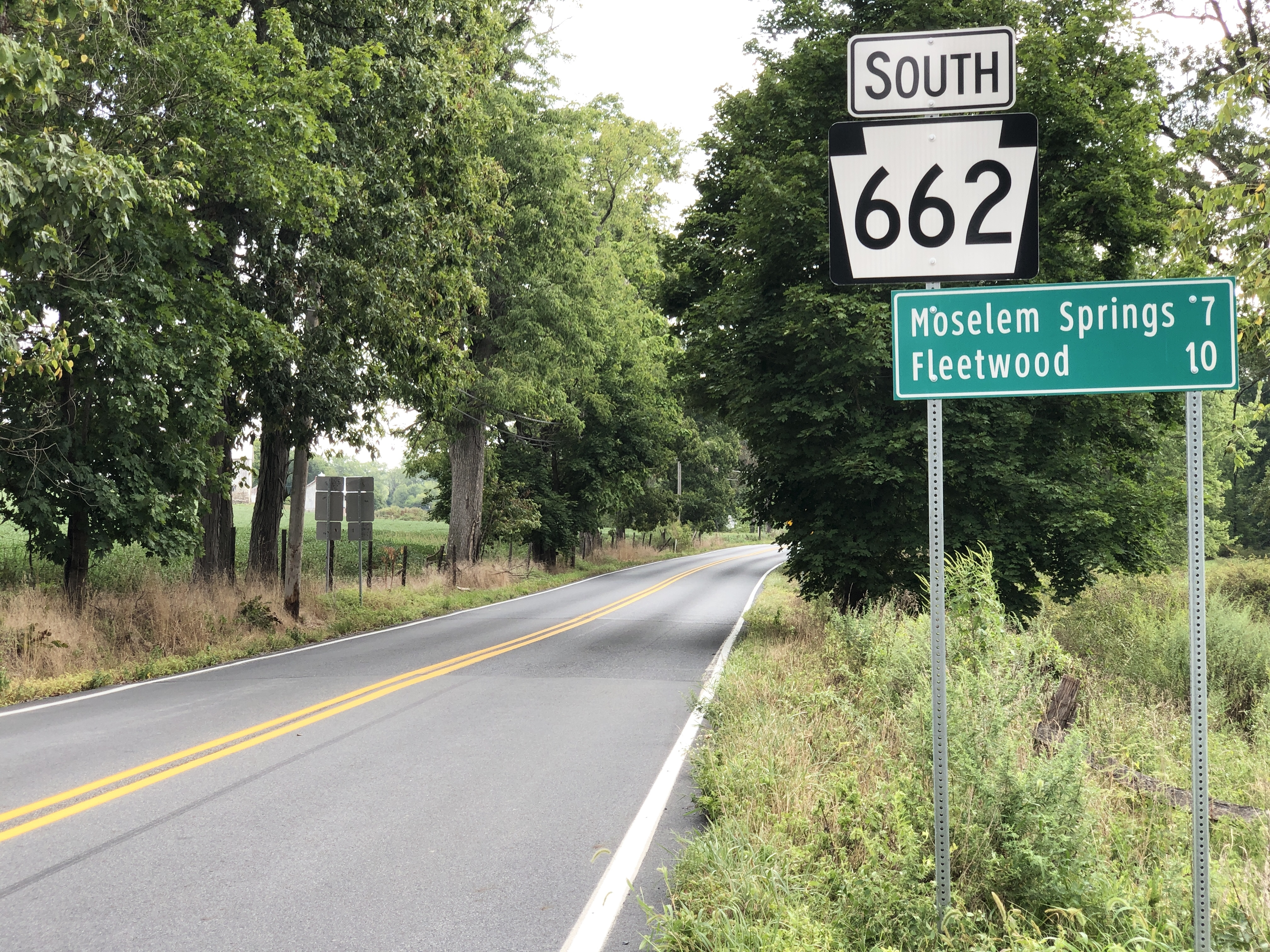
PA 662 southbound past northern terminus at PA 61 in Shoemakersville

The section of PA 662 between Douglassville and Yellow House was originally known as the King's Highway. In 1859, this road became a turnpike known as the Douglassville and Yellow House Turnpike, which existed until 1897. When routes were legislated in Pennsylvania in 1911, present-day PA 662 was not legislated as part of a route. By 1928, what would become PA 662 was paved between Douglassville and Yellow House, in the Oley area, and between Pricetown and Moselem Springs. PA 662 was first designated by 1930 to run from US 422 in Douglassville north to PA 562 in Amityville, while PA 562 was designated along the portion of road between Amityville and Yellow House. In the 1930s, PA 662 was extended north from Amityville to US 122 (now PA 61) in Shoemakersville. The route replaced the PA 562 designation between Amityville and Yellow House. At this time, the entire length of PA 662 was paved. By 1966, PA 662 was rerouted to its current alignment through Oley along with PA 73, having previously passed through the community along Deturk Road, Friedensburg Road, and Main Street.

A roundabout was constructed at the intersection with US 222 in Richmond Township in order to reduce traffic congestion. The project, which cost $6.6 million, replaced the signalized intersection between the two routes with a roundabout, with US 222 widened to four lanes at the roundabout. Construction of the roundabout began on September 6, 2016. The roundabout opened to traffic on May 22, 2018, with all lanes at the roundabout opened on July 20, 2018. On March 29, 2019, the Pennsylvania Department of Transportation announced plans to construct roundabouts at both intersections between PA 73 and PA 662 in Oley Township. Construction of the roundabouts, which cost $5.7 million, began in April 2019. The roundabout at PA 73 and PA 662 on the eastern end of Oley opened on August 19, 2019 while the roundabout at PA 73 and PA 662 on the western end of Oley opened in November 2019.

== Major intersections ==
The entire route is in Berks County.

| Location | mi | km | Destinations | Notes |
|---|---|---|---|---|
| Amity Township | 0.000 | 0.000 | US 422 (Benjamin Franklin Highway) – Pottstown, Reading | Southern terminus |
| Amity–Oley township line | 5.215 | 8.393 | PA 562 (Boyertown Pike) – St. Lawrence, Boyertown | |
| Oley Township | 9.691 | 15.596 | PA 73 east (West Philadelphia Avenue) – Boyertown | Roundabout; southern terminus of concurrency |
| Ruscombmanor Township | 11.363 | 18.287 | PA 73 west (Blandon Road) – Blandon, Leesport | Roundabout; northern terminus of concurrency |
| Ruscombmanor Township | 13.676 | 22.009 | PA 12 west (Pricetown Road) – Reading | Eastern terminus of PA 12 |
| Richmond Township | 18.311 | 29.469 | US 222 (Kutztown Road) – Reading, Kutztown, Allentown | Roundabout |
| Richmond Township | 19.597 | 31.538 | PA 143 north (Hard Hill Road) – Virginville, Lenhartsville | Southern terminus of PA 143 |
| Shoemakersville | 26.171 | 42.118 | PA 61 (Pottsville Pike) – Reading, Pottsville | Northern terminus |
1.000 mi = 1.609 km; 1.000 km = 0.621 mi: Concurrency terminus
