= Limekiln, Pennsylvania =

Unincorporated community in Pennsylvania, US

- Unincorporated community
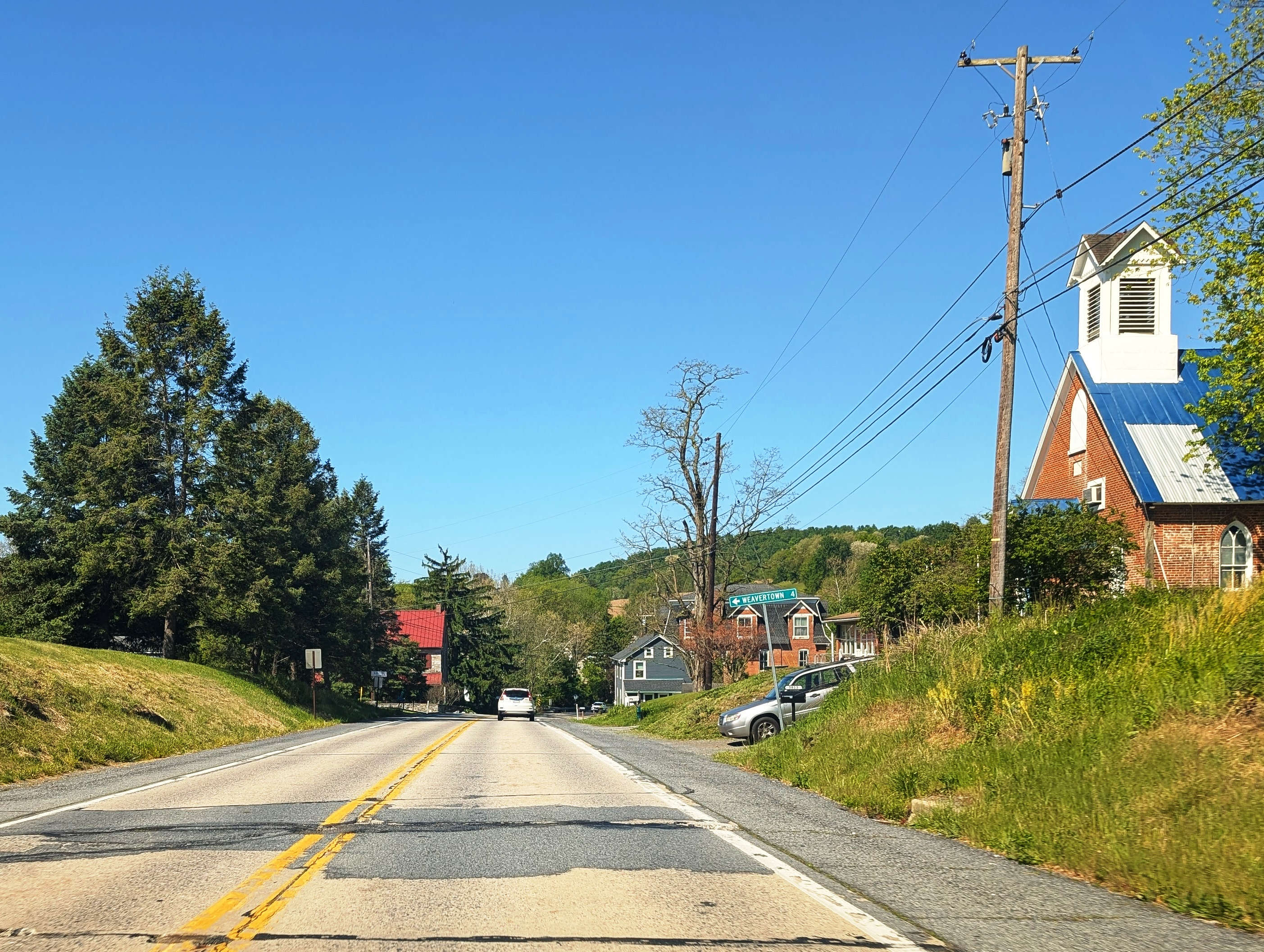
- Oley Turnpike Road in Limekiln

- Location within Pennsylvania
- Coordinates: 40°20′36″N 75°48′18″W
- Country: United States
- State: Pennsylvania
- County: Berks
- Township: Exeter and Oley
- Elevation: 289 ft (88 m)
- Time zone: UTC-5 (Eastern (EST))
  - Summer (DST): UTC-4 (EDT)
- ZIP code: 19535
- Area codes: 610 and 484
- GNIS feature ID: 2488146

Limekiln is an unincorporated community in Berks County, Pennsylvania, United States. Limekiln is located at the intersection of Oley Turnpike Road and Limekiln Road on the border of Exeter and Oley townships.
