= Ocean View Hills School =

Location
- 4919 Del Sol Boulevard; San Diego, California 92154; United States; 32°34′17″N 117°1′30″W

Information
- Established: 2001
- School district: San Ysidro Elementary School District
- Principal: Nadia Aviles
- Teaching staff: 41 (as of 2006–07)
- Grades: 4–8
- Enrollment: 1,406 (as of 2006–07)
- Classrooms: 40
- Campus: 20 acres (81,000 m^{2})
- Colours: Blue and white
- Sports: Softball, baseball, American football, soccer, basketball, volleyball
- Mascot: Dolphin
- Nickname: OVHS
- Website: ovhs.sysdschools.org

Ocean View Hills School is a public elementary and middle school in San Diego, California, United States, located near the junction of California State Route 905 and Interstate 805. At the time of its opening, it was the first new school to open in San Ysidro Elementary School District in 24 years.

== History ==
Ocean View Hills School opened in temporary buildings in 2001 with a capacity of about over 1,000 students students. The campus location, roughly two miles from Brown Field Municipal Airport, contributed to the extended period before the permanent building was constructed while the San Diego City Council debated whether to convert the airfield to a cargo airport, a change which was ultimately rejected. After that, the frequent change in district leadership was a major factor in the delay. Construction on the new buildings began in October 2004 and was completed in December 2005.

After the permanent building opened, the school became so popular that it was experiencing overcrowding within a year. The reintroduction of portable classrooms and additional staff was expected to relieve the situation, as was the construction of Vista Del Mar Elementary School in the Ocean View Hills neighborhood.

== Campus ==
The school is sited on 20 acres (8 ha) with an additional 5 acres (2 ha) for parking. The campus has seven buildings with over 40 classrooms.

The classrooms are outfitted with a variety of educational technology products, such as interactive whiteboards, wireless microphones and teacher workstations that include high-resolution document cameras.

== Extracurricular activities ==
Ocean View Hills School has an after-school performing arts program that puts on a full musical once a year.
