= Pennsylvania Route 12 =

State highway in Berks County, Pennsylvania, United States

Pennsylvania Route 12

Route information
- Maintained by PennDOT
- Length: 9.566 mi (15.395 km)
- Existed: December 1998–present

Major junctions
- West end: US 222 / US 422 in Wyomissing
- PA 183 in Reading; PA 61 in Muhlenberg Township; US 222 Bus. in Muhlenberg Township; PA 73 in Breezy Corner
- East end: PA 662 in Pricetown

Location
- Country: United States
- State: Pennsylvania
- Counties: Berks

Highway system
- Pennsylvania State Route System; Interstate; US; State; Scenic; Legislative
← PA 11	→ US 13

Pennsylvania Route 12 (PA 12) is a 9.566-mile-long (15.395 km) state highway located in Berks County in eastern Pennsylvania. The western terminus of the route is at U.S. Route 222 (US 222) and US 422 in Wyomissing. Its eastern terminus is PA 662 in the community of Pricetown in Ruscombmanor Township. In the Reading area, PA 12 is a four-lane freeway called the Warren Street Bypass that heads northeast through urban areas, coming to interchanges with multiple roads including PA 183, PA 61, and US 222 Business (US 222 Bus.). In Alsace Township, the route becomes a two-lane undivided road with at-grade intersections called Pricetown Road and continues northeast through rural areas, intersecting PA 73 before ending at PA 662.

Pricetown Road originally existed in the 18th century as a road to link farmers in Pricetown to markets in Reading. The Warren Street Bypass was first planned in 1949 as a widening of Warren Street in Reading leading to a new bridge over Tulpehocken Creek to Wyomissing. In the 1950s, the Warren Street Bypass was completed from Wyomissing northeast to US 222 (Allentown Pike, now 5th Street Highway) north of Reading, providing a bypass of Reading. US 222 was routed onto this bypass by 1976, with the Warren Street Bypass extended northeast to Pricetown Road in 1980. The part of the Warren Street Bypass northeast of US 222 along with Pricetown Road became State Route 2026 (SR 2026) when the Location Referencing System was established. In 1998, PA 12 was assigned to its current alignment following the rerouting of US 222 onto a new bypass of Reading.

== Route description ==
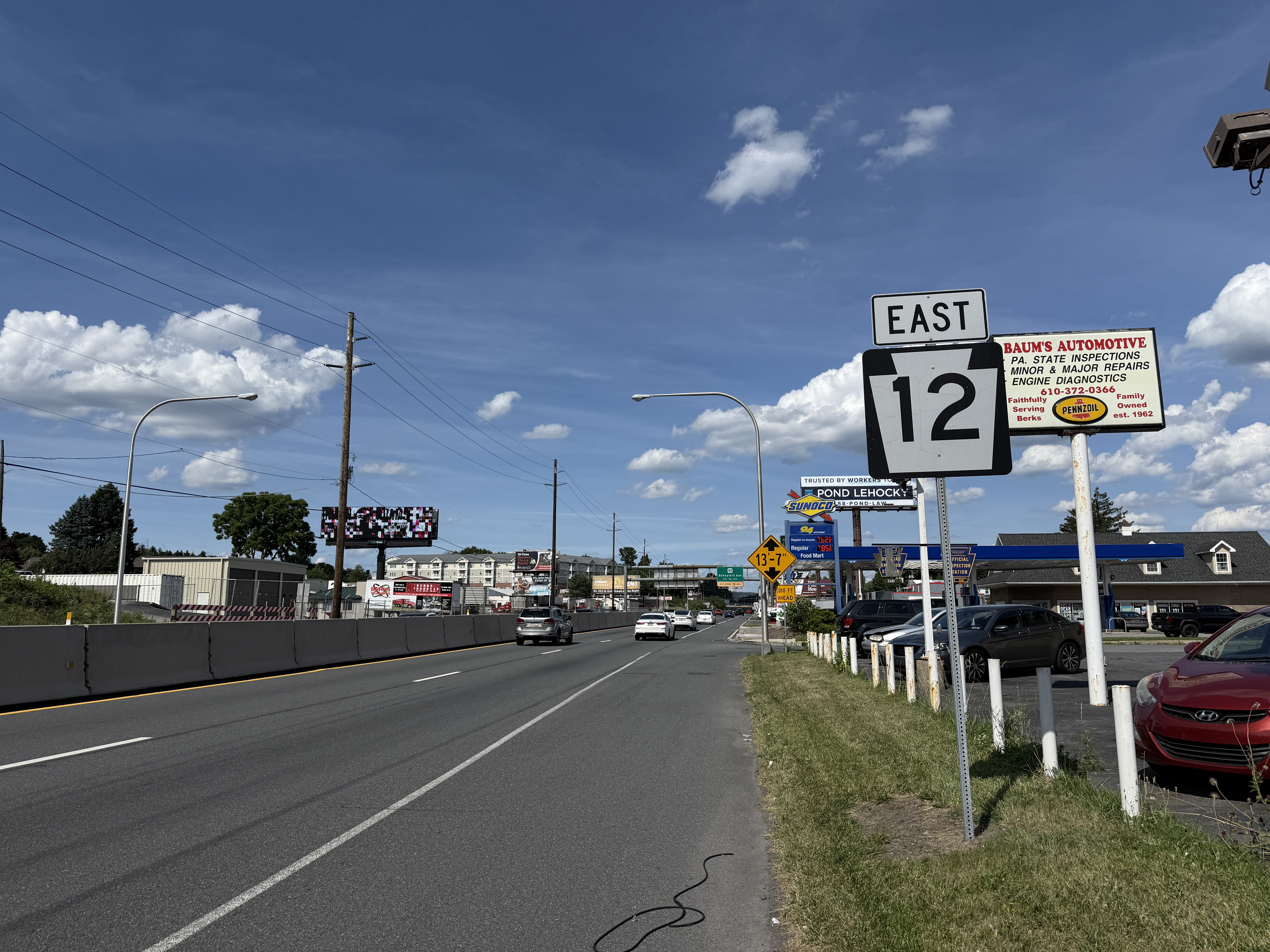
PA 12 eastbound approaching the PA 183 interchange in Reading

PA 12 begins at an interchange with US 222 and US 422 in the borough of Wyomissing. Southwest of this interchange, the Warren Street Bypass continues as part of southbound US 222 and westbound US 422. US 222 northbound continues northwest and US 422 eastbound continues southeast on the West Shore Bypass. PA 12 does not have access to northbound or from southbound US 222 at this interchange. From US 222/US 422, the route heads northeast on the four-lane divided Warren Street Bypass. PA 12 crosses Tulpehocken Creek into the city of Reading and heads through commercial areas. Along this stretch, the route has no cross traffic, with access to some local streets as well as businesses while access to other local cross streets is blocked by barricades. The road comes to an interchange with PA 183, with access provided from right-in/right-out ramps to Butler Street and Lehigh Street in the eastbound direction and to Carbon Street and Lackawanna Street in the westbound direction. The PA 183 interchange provides access to Reading Regional Airport, an airport with charter flights that is also home to the Mid-Atlantic Air Museum. Following this interchange, the route becomes a freeway and heads near residential neighborhoods and turns north, running to the west of Norfolk Southern's Reading Line. PA 12 crosses the Schuylkill River and comes to a partial cloverleaf interchange with River Road.

From here, the freeway curves to the northeast and passes under the Reading Line, heading into commercial areas within Muhlenberg Township and coming to a partial cloverleaf interchange with PA 61 that has an eastbound exit and a westbound entrance along with an eastbound entrance from northbound PA 61. The exit to southbound PA 61 provides access to FirstEnergy Stadium, the home ballpark of Minor League Baseball's Reading Fightin Phils. The route passes under Norfolk Southern's Pottsville Branch and comes to a partial cloverleaf interchange with US 222 Bus.; this interchange provides access from westbound PA 12 to PA 61 and northbound US 222. Past this interchange, the freeway continues near more development, reaching a diamond interchange with 11th Street. PA 12 heads into more wooded surroundings and curves northeast. The route comes to a partial cloverleaf interchange with Spring Valley Road and continues into Alsace Township, where the freeway ends.

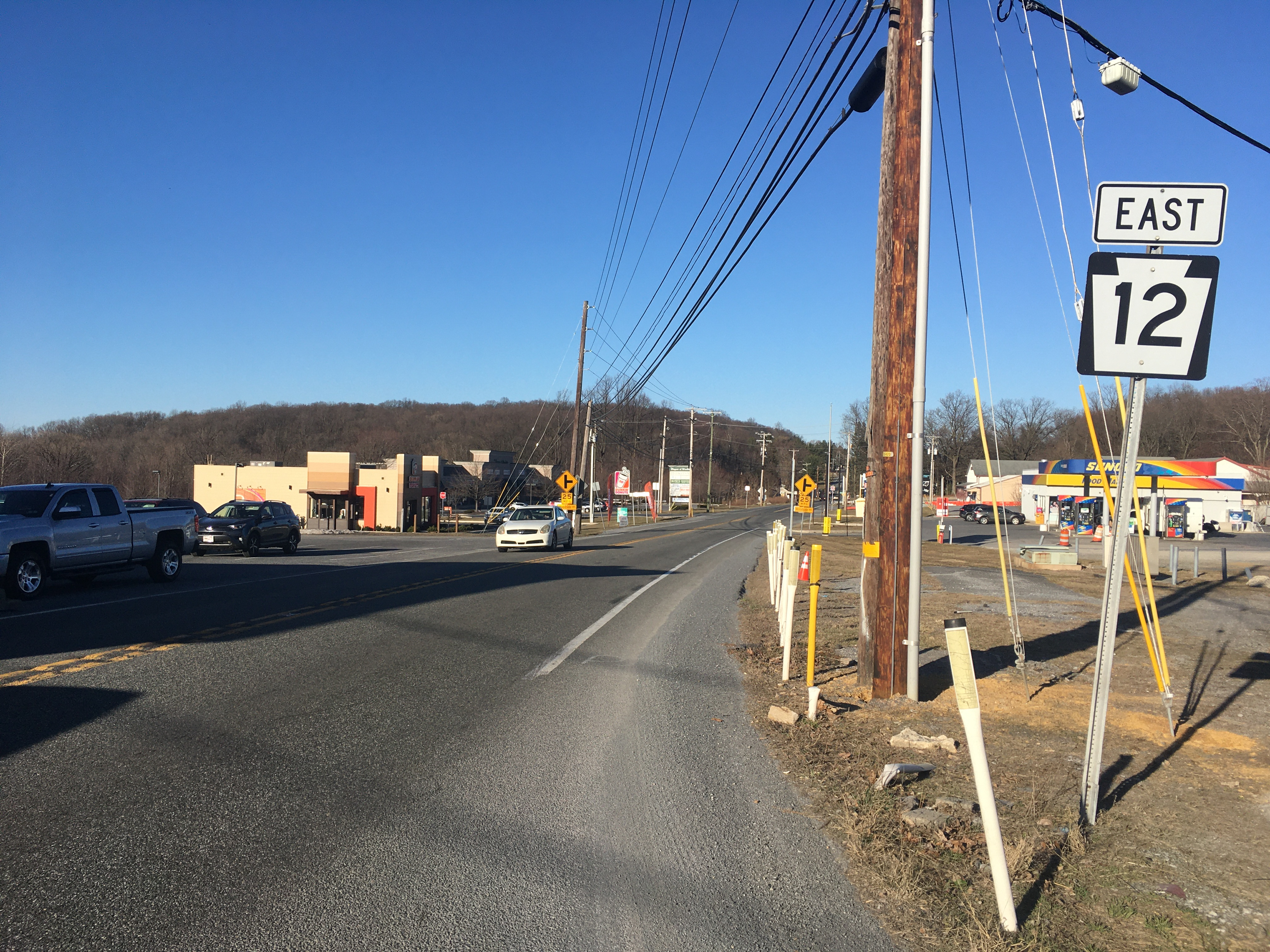
PA 12 eastbound in Alsace Township

After the freeway ends, PA 12 becomes a two-lane undivided road with at-grade intersections called Pricetown Road, continuing northeast through forested areas with some homes and businesses. The road passes through the community of Alsace Manor before crossing into Ruscombmanor Township, where it intersects PA 73 in the community of Breezy Corner. Past this intersection, the route continues through a mix of farmland and woodland with some homes. PA 12 ends at an intersection with PA 662 in the community of Pricetown, where Pricetown Road continues northeast as SR 2026, an unsigned quadrant route, to a five-way intersection with Lobachsville Road, Lyons Road, Henry Road, and Deysher Road in the community of New Jerusalem in Rockland Township.

In 2016, PA 12 had an annual average daily traffic count ranging from a high of 59,000 vehicles between the US 222/US 422 and PA 183 interchanges to a low of 8,600 vehicles between PA 73 and Walnuttown Road. The portion of PA 12 from PA 61 to Antietam Road is a part of the National Highway System.

== History ==
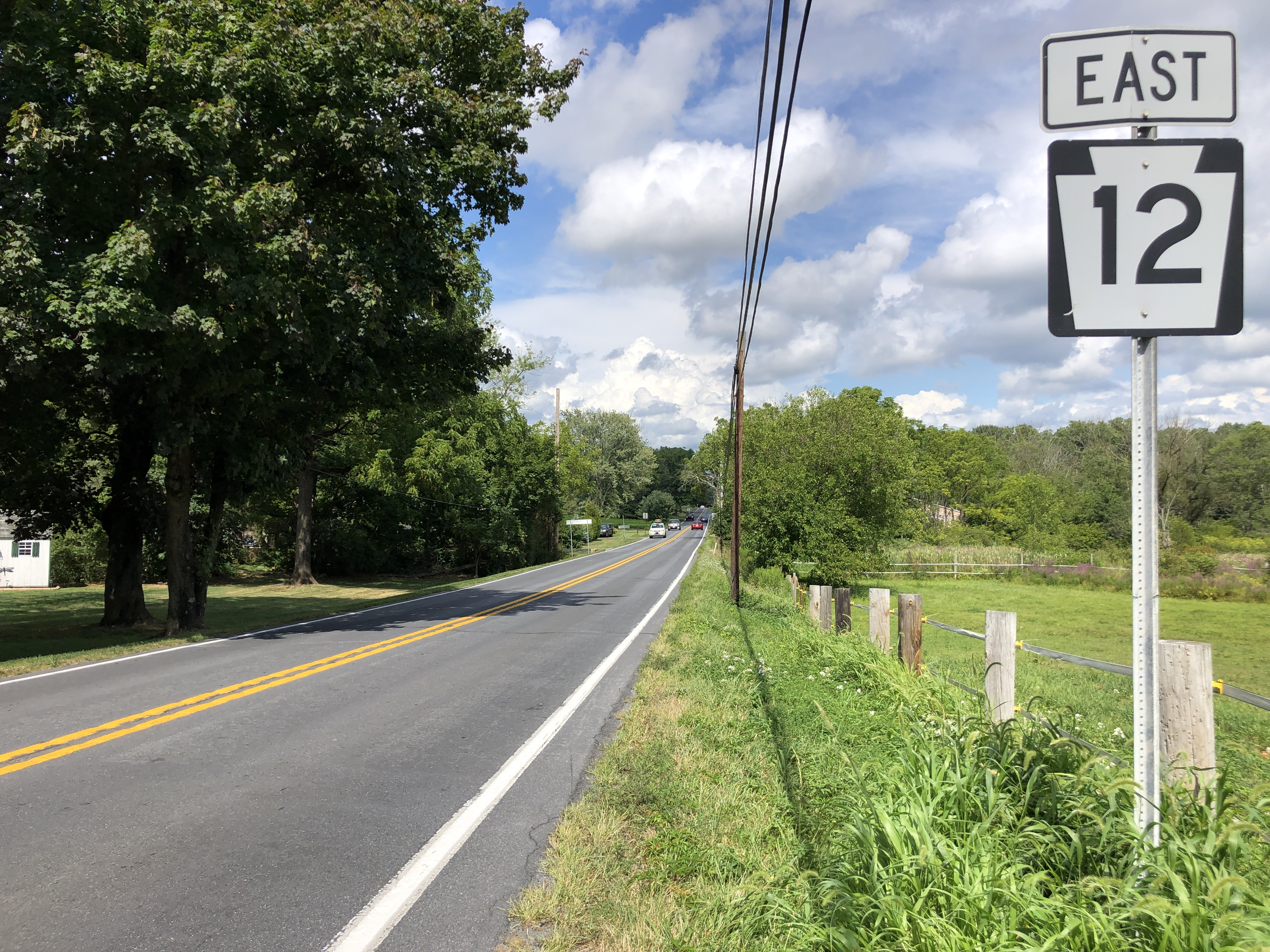
PA 12 eastbound in Ruscombmanor Township

Pricetown Road dates back to the 18th century as a road linking the village of Pricetown to Reading. The road was used by farmers in the Pricetown area who traveled to Reading to buy and sell wares. Pricetown was settled in 1754 and grew into a village with three taverns and a general store that served the trade to and from Reading. In the 19th century, Pricetown Road was used to transport Montana horses from Temple to country auctions in the area. Pricetown Road was originally an unpaved road. Warren Street in Reading was constructed by 1920, running from Fayette Street near the Tulpehocken Creek east to a dead end near the Schuylkill River. In 1927, Pricetown Road was paved in concrete. The road was straightened at the Walnuttown Road intersection by 1940.

In 1949, plans were made to build a four-lane bridge across Tulpehocken Creek at Warren Street. As part of this plan, Warren Street was to be widened from the proposed bridge to Schuylkill Avenue. This widened Warren Street was envisioned to become part of a bypass route of Reading. The bridge and widening were approved with the provision that Warren Street only be widened as far as Schuylkill Avenue as not to build a bypass route through a residential area. Construction on the bridge and the Warren Street Bypass between US 422 (Harrisburg Pike, now Penn Avenue) and PA 83 (now PA 183, Schuylkill Avenue) began in 1950. In 1953, the Park Avenue Extension (which extended Park Avenue in Wyomissing to the bypass) and the Warren Street Bypass from US 422 in Wyomissing to Tulpehocken Creek, along with the Tulpehocken Creek bridge, was finished, with a continuation of the Warren Street Bypass northeast from PA 83 to US 222 (Allentown Pike, now 5th Street Highway) proposed. Construction on the extension of the Warren Street Bypass to US 222 began in 1956 with the process of widening of the existing Warren Street. The PA 83 bridge over the bypass was built in 1957. In 1959, the Warren Street Bypass extension to US 222 was opened to traffic with the portion of Warren Street between Tulpehocken Creek and PA 83 widened to four lanes. The Warren Street Bypass included an interchange with the under-construction Reading Bypass (now US 422, West Shore Bypass) southwest of Tulpehocken Creek when it opened in 1959.

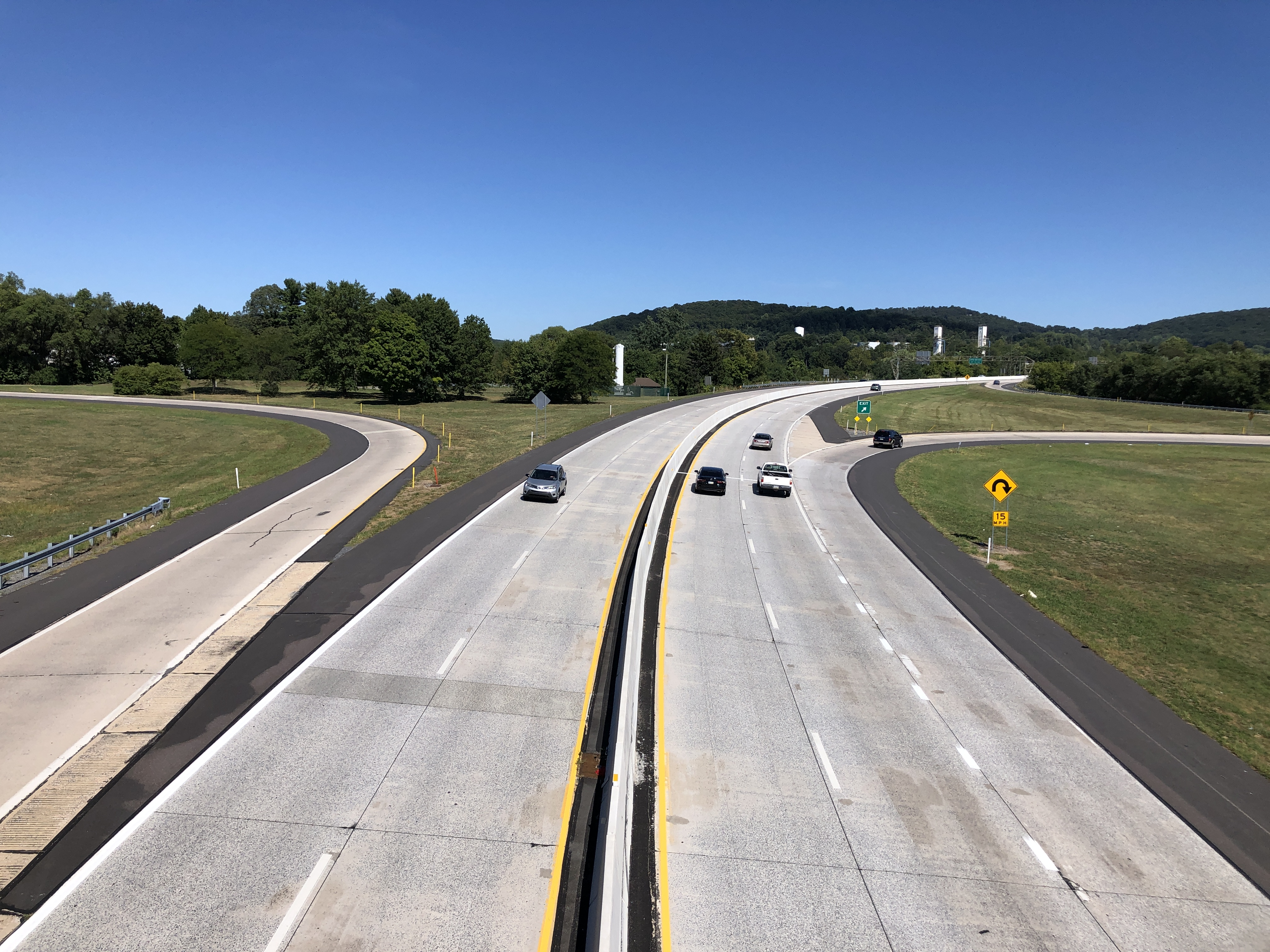
PA 12 eastbound at interchange with US 222 Bus. in Muhlenberg Township

An extension of the Warren Street Bypass from US 222 to Pricetown Road was proposed in 1962. Two routes for the extension were proposed: one following a more southerly route as it does today and another following a more northerly route along Spring Valley Road, passing near the Bernhart Reservoir. The extension of the bypass was intended to provide access to a growing industrial park. In 1966, plans were made to make the portion of the Warren Street Bypass through the Glenside neighborhood of Reading limited-access by eliminating at-grade intersections with local streets, resulting in the streets coming to a dead end at the bypass. The more southerly route for the Warren Street Bypass extension between US 222 and Pricetown Road was selected by 1969. On November 15, 1975, the American Association of State Highway and Transportation Officials (AASHTO) approved for US 222 to be routed to bypass Reading, with the route following the Warren Street Bypass between US 422 in Wyomissing and Allentown Pike. In 1976, construction began on the extension of the Warren Street Bypass between US 222 and Pricetown Road. The portion of the Warren Street Bypass between Spring Valley Road and Pricetown Road was completed in July 1979 while the portion between 11th Street and Spring Valley Road was completed in December 1979. In 1980, the remainder of the Warren Street Bypass extension between US 222 and 11th Street was completed.

With the establishment of the Location Referencing System for state roads in 1987, the Warren Street Bypass between US 222 and Pricetown Road, along with the entire length of Pricetown Road northeast to New Jerusalem, became SR 2026. In 1998, US 222 was rerouted to a freeway alignment northwest of Reading following the completion of the Park Road Corridor in October of that year; the PA 12 designation was given to the Warren Street Bypass northeast of US 222/US 422 in Wyomissing as well as to SR 2026 up to the intersection with PA 662 in December of that year.

There are plans to improve the section of PA 12 in Alsace Township, including the construction of a roundabout at the intersection with Elizabeth Avenue/Hillview Road. Construction on this improvement project is planned to begin in 2026 and be finished in 2027.

== Major intersections ==
The entire route is in Berks County.

Location	mi	km	Destinations	Notes
Wyomissing	0.000	0.000	US 222 south / US 422 west – Lancaster, Lebanon	Continuation west
Wyomissing	0.000	0.000	US 422 east – Pottstown	Interchange; access to I-176 and PA 10
Reading	0.616	0.991	To PA 183 (Schuylkill Avenue) – Reading Airport	Right-in/right-out; access via Butler Street eastbound, Carbon Street westbound; Reading Airport not signed eastbound
Reading	0.616	0.991	West end of freeway section	
Reading	1.289	2.074	River Road	
Muhlenberg Township	1.927	3.101	PA 61 (Centre Avenue)	No westbound exit; access to FirstEnergy Stadium, Reading, and Pottsville
Muhlenberg Township	2.301	3.703	US 222 Bus. (5th Street) to US 222 north – Allentown	US 222 and Allentown signed westbound; access to PA 61 and FirstEnergy Stadium
Muhlenberg Township	2.854	4.593	11th Street	
Muhlenberg Township	3.959	6.371	Spring Valley Road	
Alsace Township	4.600	7.403	East end of freeway section	
Ruscombmanor Township	7.838	12.614	PA 73 (Blandon Road) to US 222 – Maiden Creek, Oley, Allentown	
Ruscombmanor Township	9.566	15.395	PA 662 (Memorial Highway) – Fleetwood, Oley	Eastern terminus
1.000 mi = 1.609 km; 1.000 km = 0.621 mi: Incomplete access
