= Oley Valley High School =

Location
- 17 Jefferson Street; Oley Valley, Berks County, Pennsylvania 19547; United States; 40.386041°N 75.785069°W

Information
- Funding type: Public
- Motto: "Enter to learn, leave to serve."
- Established: 1961
- School district: Oley Valley School District
- Superintendent: Gina Finnerty
- Principal: William Harrison
- Staff: 39.56 (FTE)
- Grades: 9-12
- Enrollment: 508 (2023–2024)
- Student to teacher ratio: 12.84
- Colors: Blue and White
- Athletics: Yes
- Mascot: Lynx
- Information: 610-987-4100 Ex. 6000
- Website: Oley Valley High School

Oley Valley High School is a high school in Oley Valley, Pennsylvania, United States. The current principal is Gina Finnerty.

== History ==
Oley Valley High School was built in 1961. The current high school was adjacent to the Oley Valley School District Administration building, which was formerly the Oley Valley K-5 building until 1993. In 2018, the Administration Building was demolished and only a grass field remains.

The high school was renovated in 1981 to have a joint middle school. In 2002, a new separate middle school was built and the left-over wing was incorporated into the high school, primarily as the "history wing".

The school district superintendent was Jeffrey Zackon, until he died due to a heart attack during the German class trip, on April 20, 2011, while in the Swiss Alps. The Oley Valley School District's current superintendent is Gina Finnerty.

== Athletics ==
The baseball team won the county championship for the first time in 28 years. The girls' field hockey team has won at least three Berks County titles, two PIAA district titles, and one state title.

The girls' basketball team and the baseball team have enjoyed PIAA District titles and state appearances.

== Events ==
The Oley Valley FFA Chapter placed first in the United States in Environmental Science and FFA National Convention in Indianapolis, Indiana.

The school made the national news on January 24, 2002, when a 62-year-old bus driver, named Otto Nuss, took 13 children on an unauthorized five-hour detour of 115 miles (185 km) to Landover Hills, Maryland outside Washington, D.C., on what was supposed to be a 6-mile, 15-minute trip to Berks Christian School in Birdsboro, Pennsylvania. On September 23, 2003, Nuss was sentenced to 4 years in prison for federal kidnapping.

A student wearing a gorilla mask and armed with a banana climbed onto the roof of the high school on February 15, 2005, as a prank. This prompted police, the FBI, a bomb squad and a state police helicopter to respond. The student was charged with disorderly conduct and trespassing

The school won the 2006 Envirothon, the most popular high school environmental knowledge competition in North America.

== Notable alumni ==
- Carl Mathias, retired MLB player
