= Ruscombmanor Township, Pennsylvania =

Township in Pennsylvania, US

Ruscombmanor Township
- Township
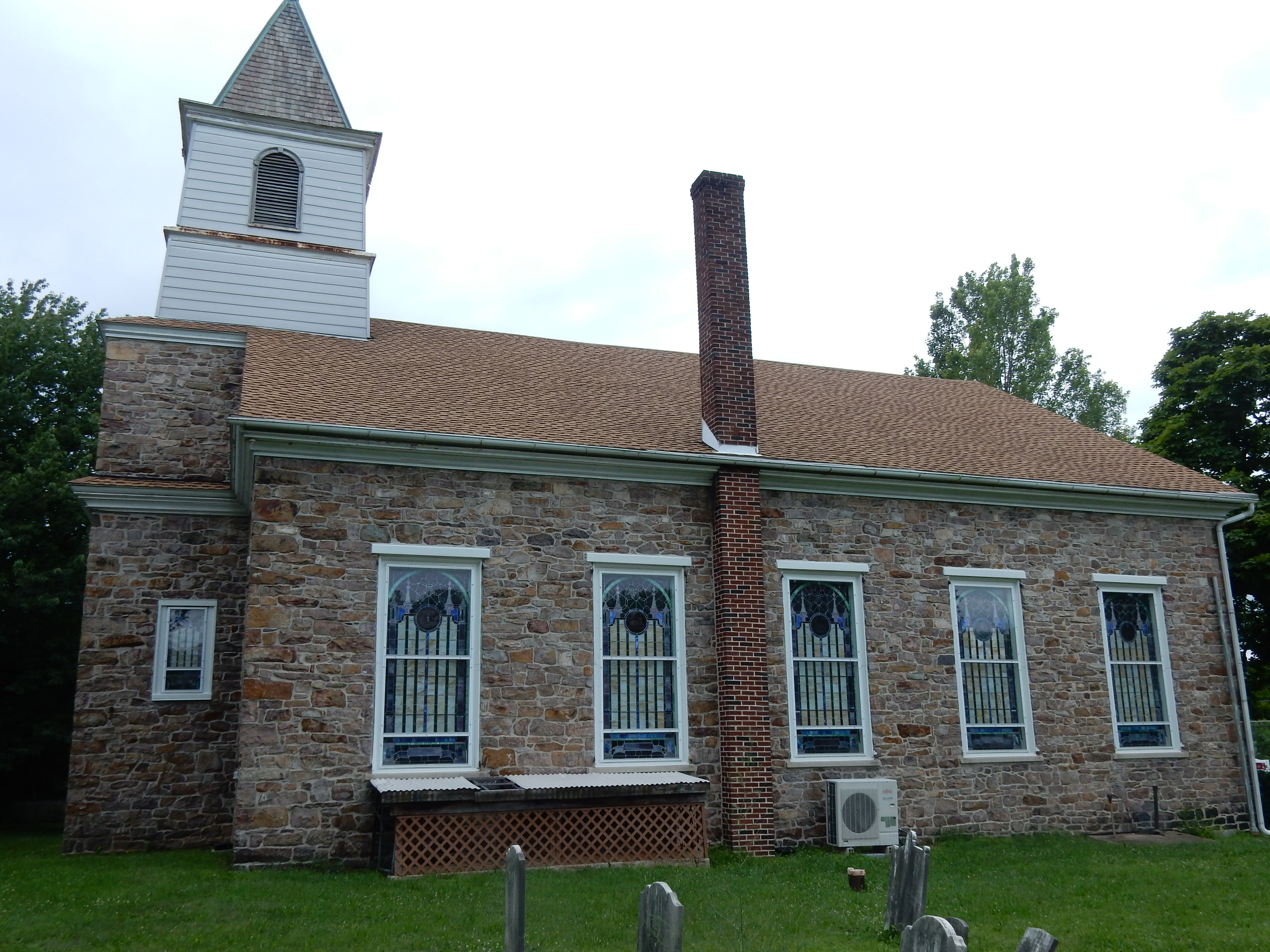
- St. John's UCC in Pricetown

- Location of Ruscombmanor Township in Pennsylvania Ruscombmanor Township (the United States)
- Coordinates: 40°25′30″N 75°52′59″W
- Country: United States
- State: Pennsylvania
- County: Berks

Area
  - Total: 13.73 sq mi (35.55 km^{2})
  - Land: 13.66 sq mi (35.38 km^{2})
  - Water: 0.066 sq mi (0.17 km^{2})
- Elevation: 787 ft (240 m)

Population (2010)
  - Total: 4,112
  - Estimate (2016): 4,145
  - Density: 303.4/sq mi (117.15/km^{2})
- Time zone: UTC-5 (EST)
  - Summer (DST): UTC-4 (EDT)
- Area code: 610
- FIPS code: 42-011-66728
- Website: http://www.ruscombmanor.org/

Ruscombmanor Township is a township in Berks County, Pennsylvania, United States. The population was 4,112 at the 2010 census.

== Geography ==
According to the U.S. Census Bureau, the township has a total area of 13.9 square miles (36.1 km^{2}), all land.

Adjacent townships

- Alsace Township (southwest)
- Muhlenberg Township (far west)
- Maidencreek Township (northwest)
- Richmond Township and Borough of Fleetwood (north)
- Rockland Township (northeast)
- Oley Township (southeast)

== Transportation ==
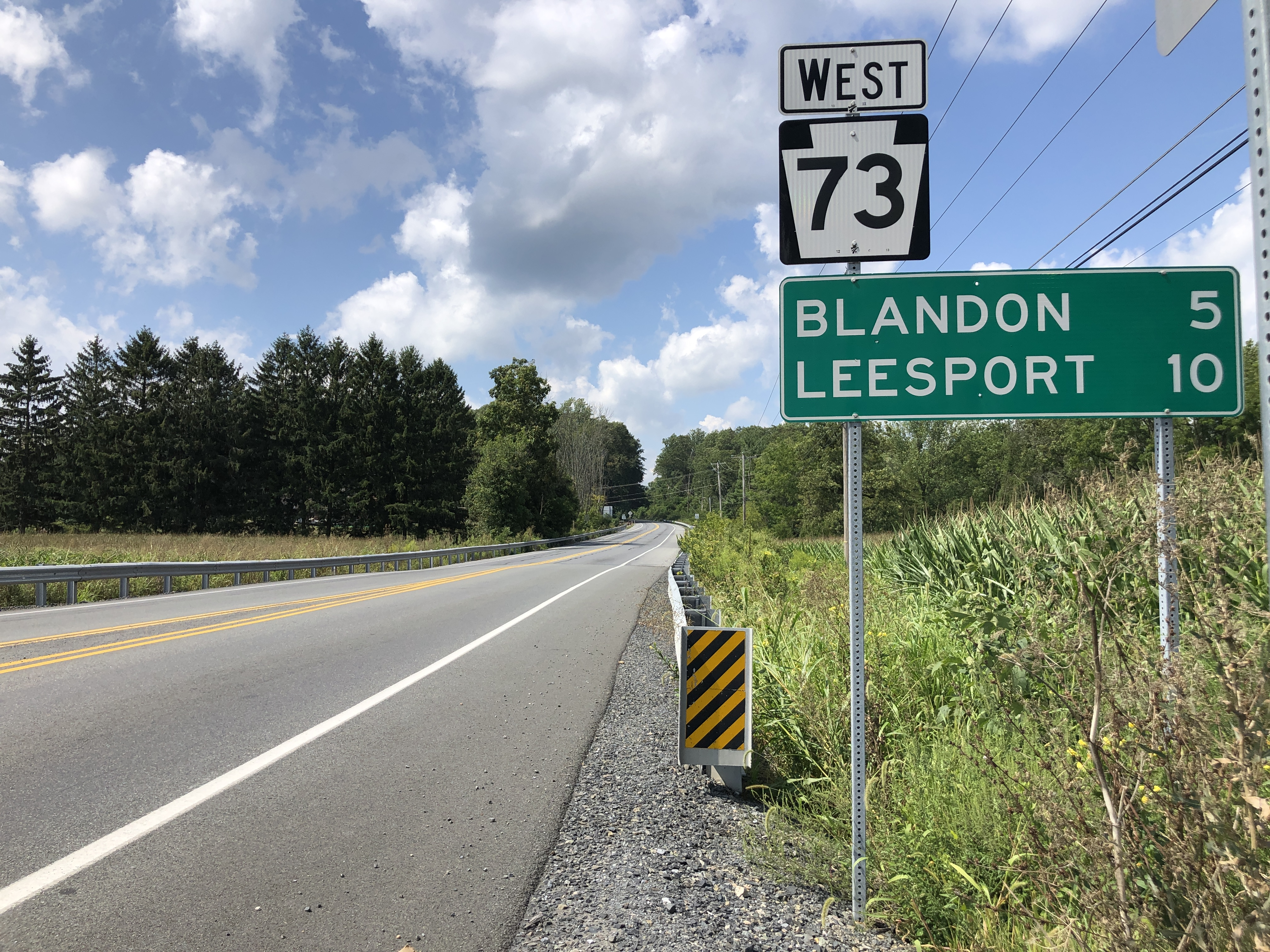
PA 73 westbound in Ruscombmanor Township

As of 2019, there were 52.01 miles (83.70 km) of public roads in Ruscombmanor Township, of which 15.35 miles (24.70 km) were maintained by the Pennsylvania Department of Transportation (PennDOT) and 36.66 miles (59.00 km) were maintained by the township.

Numbered highways serving Ruscombmanor Township include Pennsylvania Route 12, Pennsylvania Route 73, and Pennsylvania Route 662. PA 12 follows Pricetown Road along a southwest–northeast alignment across the southwestern and central portions of the township, terminating at PA 662. PA 73 follows Blandon Road along a northwest–southeast alignment across southern and eastern portions of the township. PA 662 follows Memorial Highway along a north–south alignment through the center of the township.

== Demographics ==
Historical population
Census	Pop.	Note	%±
1980	2,546		—
1990	3,129		22.9%
2000	3,776		20.7%
2010	4,112		8.9%
2016 (est.)	4,145		0.8%
Source: US Census Bureau

At the 2000 census there were 3,776 people, 1,378 households, and 1,103 families living in the township. The population density was 271.3 inhabitants per square mile (104.7/km^{2}). There were 1,421 housing units at an average density of 102.1 per square mile (39.4/km^{2}). The racial makeup of the township was 98.78% White, 0.16% African American, 0.03% Native American, 0.24% Asian, 0.05% from other races, and 0.74% from two or more races. Hispanic or Latino of any race were 1.22%.

There were 1,378 households, 35.5% had children under the age of 18 living with them, 72.1% were married couples living together, 4.6% had a female householder with no husband present, and 19.9% were non-families. 16.3% of households were made up of individuals, and 7.0% were one person aged 65 or older. The average household size was 2.71 and the average family size was 3.05.

The age distribution was 24.6% under the age of 18, 6.0% from 18 to 24, 28.8% from 25 to 44, 28.6% from 45 to 64, and 12.0% 65 or older. The median age was 41 years. For every 100 females, there were 100.6 males. For every 100 females age 18 and over, there were 98.7 males.

The median income for a household in the township was $56,813, and the median family income was $64,010. Males had a median income of $41,816 versus $27,885 for females. The per capita income for the township was $23,889. About 2.9% of families and 4.2% of the population were below the poverty line, including 3.8% of those under age 18 and 4.2% of those age 65 or over.

== Gallery ==
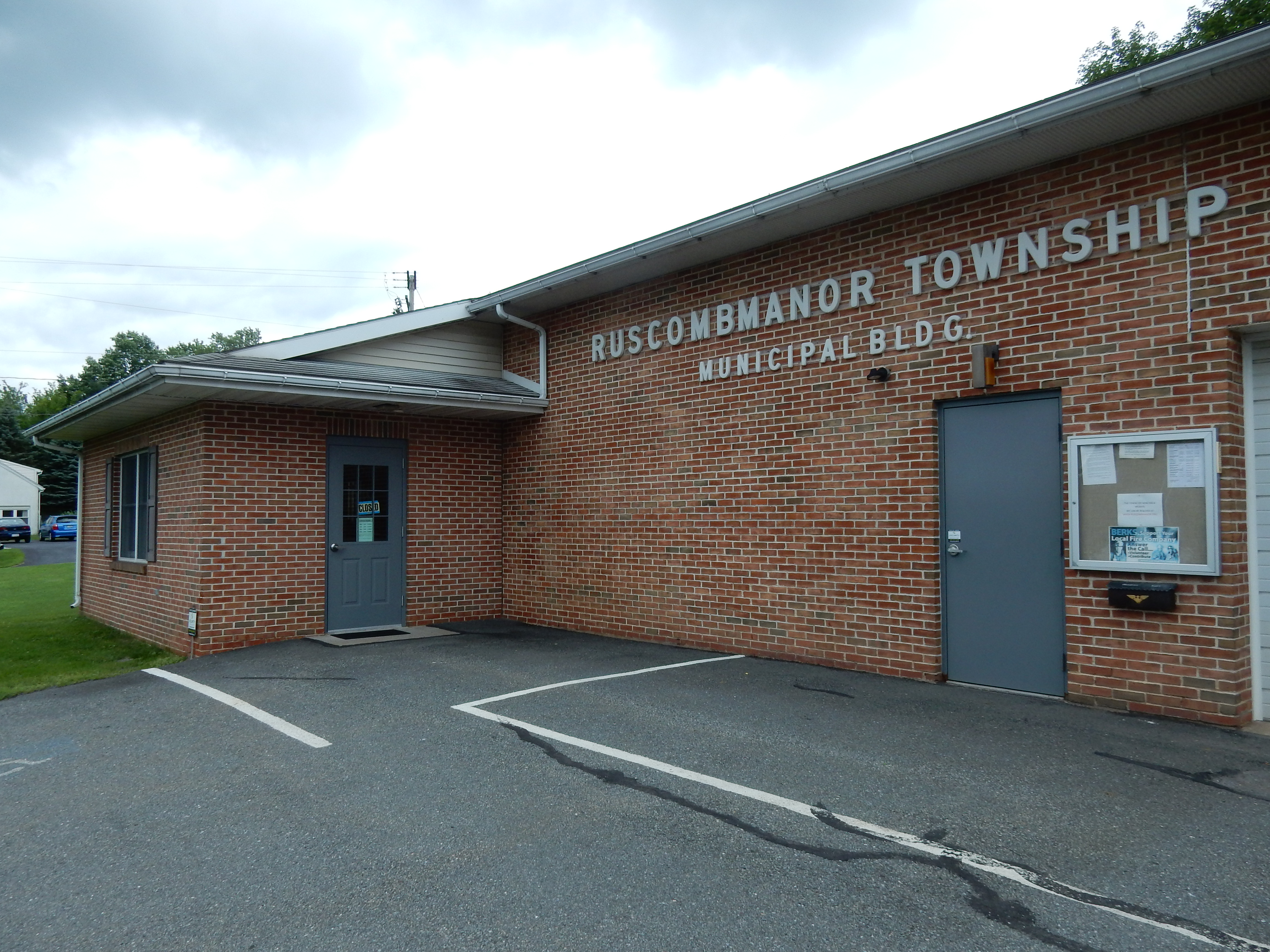
Ruscombmanor Twp. Municipal Bldg.

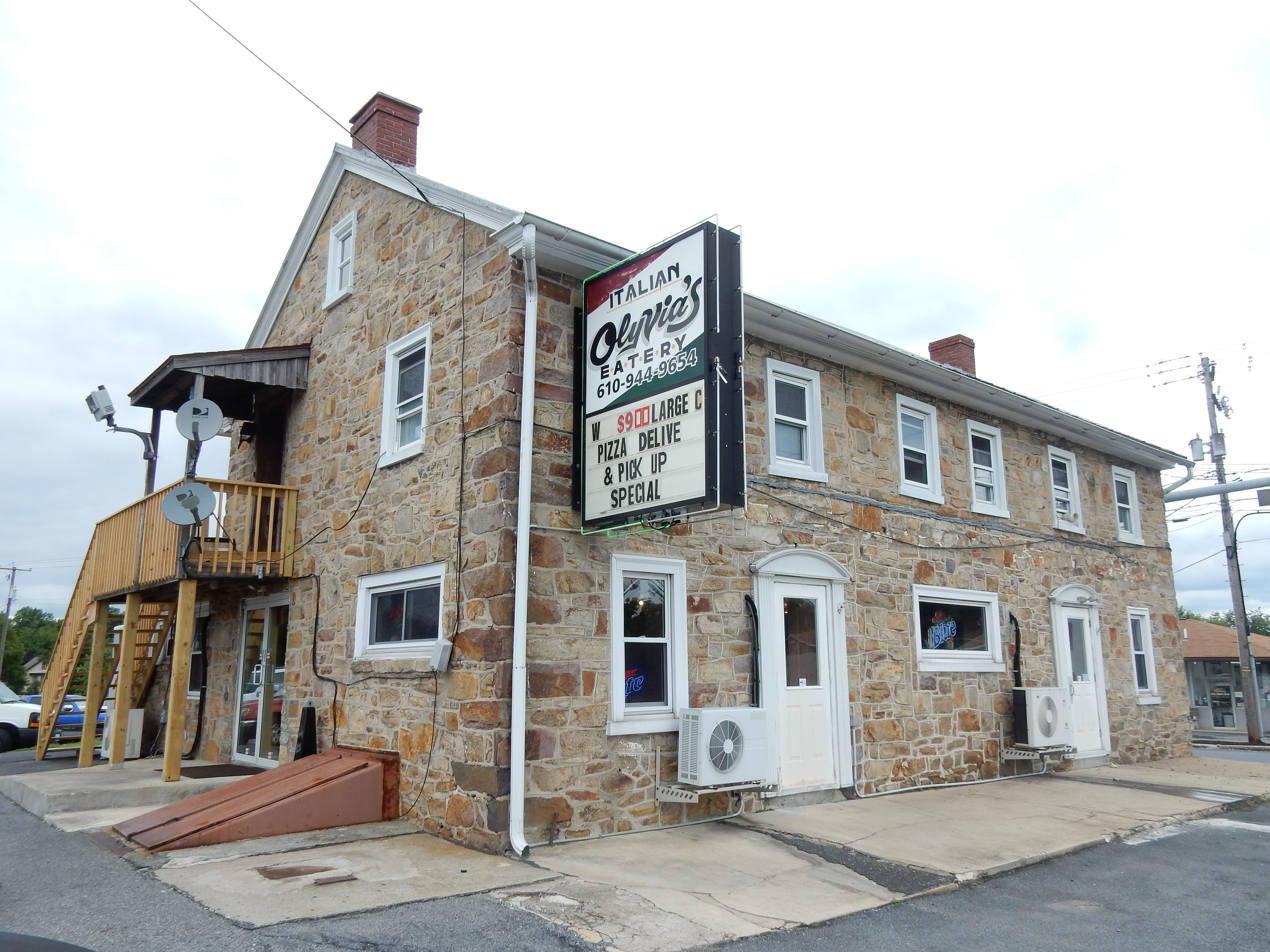
Pricetown. Olyvia's Eatery.

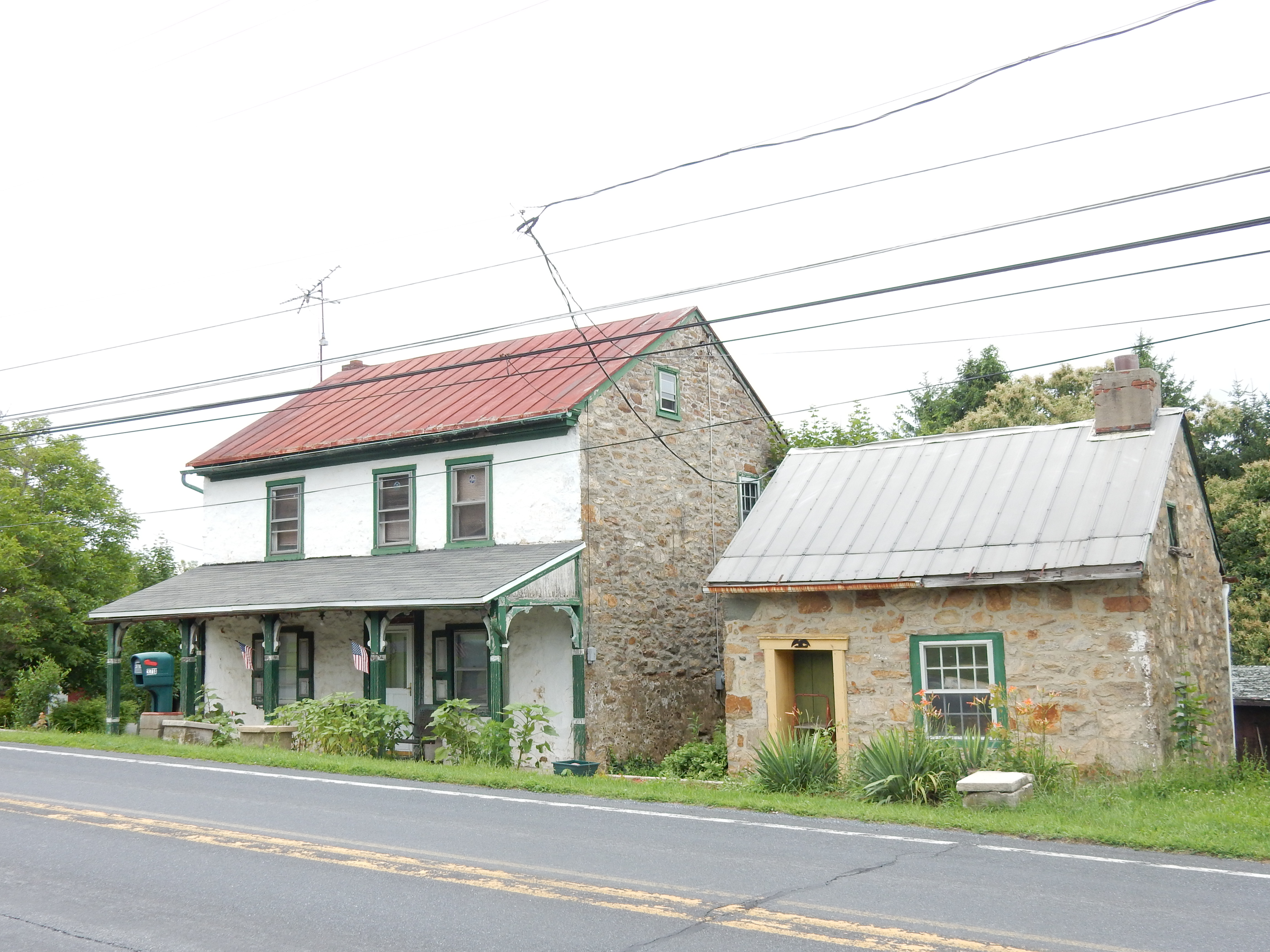
Pricetown Rd.
