= Alsace Township, Pennsylvania =

Township in Pennsylvania, US

- Township
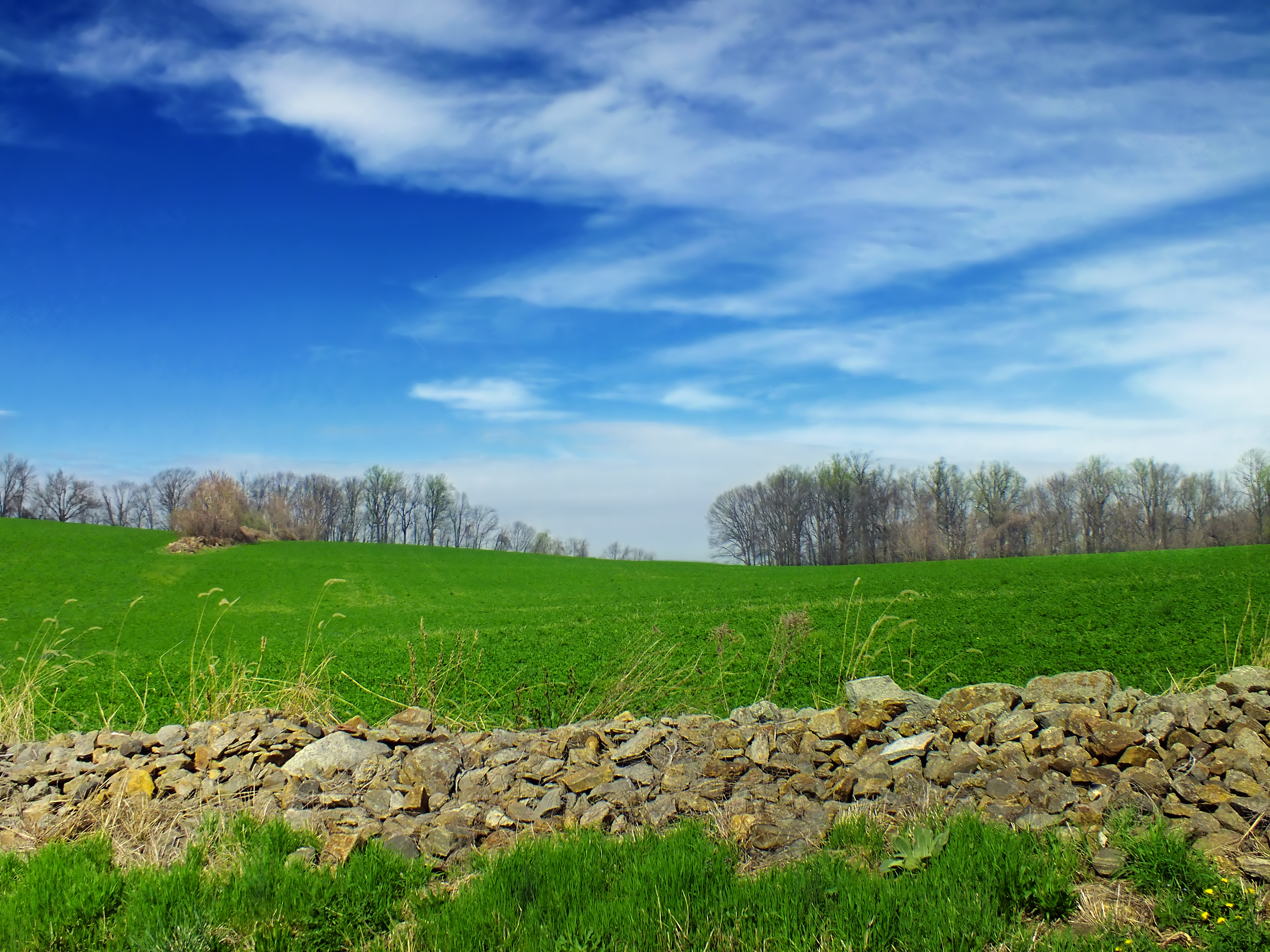
- A field in the township

- Seal

- Location of Alsace Township in Pennsylvania Alsace Township (the United States)
- Coordinates: 40°23′14″N 75°51′30″W
- Country: United States
- State: Pennsylvania
- County: Berks

Area
  - Total: 12.18 sq mi (31.54 km^{2})
  - Land: 12.15 sq mi (31.48 km^{2})
  - Water: 0.027 sq mi (0.07 km^{2})
- Elevation: 840 ft (260 m)

Population (2020)
  - Total: 3,848 ▲
  - Estimate (2021): 3,849
  - Density: 323.4/sq mi (124.85/km^{2})
- Time zone: UTC−05:00 (EST)
  - Summer (DST): UTC−04:00 (EDT)
- Area code: 610
- FIPS code: 42-011-02120
- Website: www.alsacetownship.org

Alsace Township (pronounced "ALL-siss") is a township in Berks County, Pennsylvania, United States. The population was 3,848 at the 2020 census.

== History ==
Alsace Township was established on March 3, 1745, following a petition to the Pennsylvania Court of Quarter Sessions. The township was given its name in deference to the original settlers, who came from Alsace, German Empire in present-day France. The township's settlers were predominantly industrious farmers and millers. Large areas of land were cleared for agricultural production, streams were harnessed for milling, and churches were built for spiritual and social needs.

== Geography ==
According to the U.S. Census Bureau, the township has a total area of 12.2 square miles (32 km^{2}), all land. It contains the census-designated place of Alsace Manor.

Adjacent townships

- Muhlenberg Township (west)
- Ruscombmanor Township (north)
- Oley Township (east)
- Exeter Township (southeast)
- Lower Alsace Township (south)

== Demographics ==
Historical population
Census	Pop.	Note	%±
2000	3,689		—
2010	3,751		1.7%
2020	3,848		2.6%
2021 (est.)	3,849		0.0%
Source: US Census Bureau

At the 2000 census, there were 3,689 people, 1,433 households, and 1,060 families living in the township. The population density was 302.3 inhabitants per square mile (116.7/km^{2}). There were 1,503 housing units at an average density of 123.2 per square mile (47.6/km^{2}). The racial makeup of the township was 98.43% White, 0.43% African American, 0.14% Native American, 0.52% Asian, 0.08% Pacific Islander, 0.27% from other races, and 0.14% from two or more races. Hispanic or Latino of any race were 0.98%.

There were 1,433 households, 27.9% had children under the age of 18 living with them, 63.2% were married couples living together, 5.2% had a female householder with no husband present, and 26.0% were non-families. 20.1% of households were made up of individuals, and 8.6% were one person aged 65 or older. The average household size was 2.57 and the average family size was 2.96.

The age distribution was 21.8% under the age of 18, 5.9% from 18 to 24, 27.8% from 25 to 44, 28.3% from 45 to 64, and 16.3% 65 or older. The median age was 42 years. For every 100 females, there were 101.5 males. For every 100 females age 18 and over, there were 100.8 males.

The median household income was $46,500 and the median family income was $52,621. Males had a median income of $39,866 versus $25,808 for females. The per capita income for the township was $21,385. About 2.5% of families and 4.4% of the population were below the poverty line, including 4.8% of those under age 18 and 3.8% of those age 65 or over.

== Notable people ==
- Tommy Hinnershitz, race car driver
- Conrad Feger Jackson, Union Army general killed in the Battle of Fredericksburg

== Transportation ==
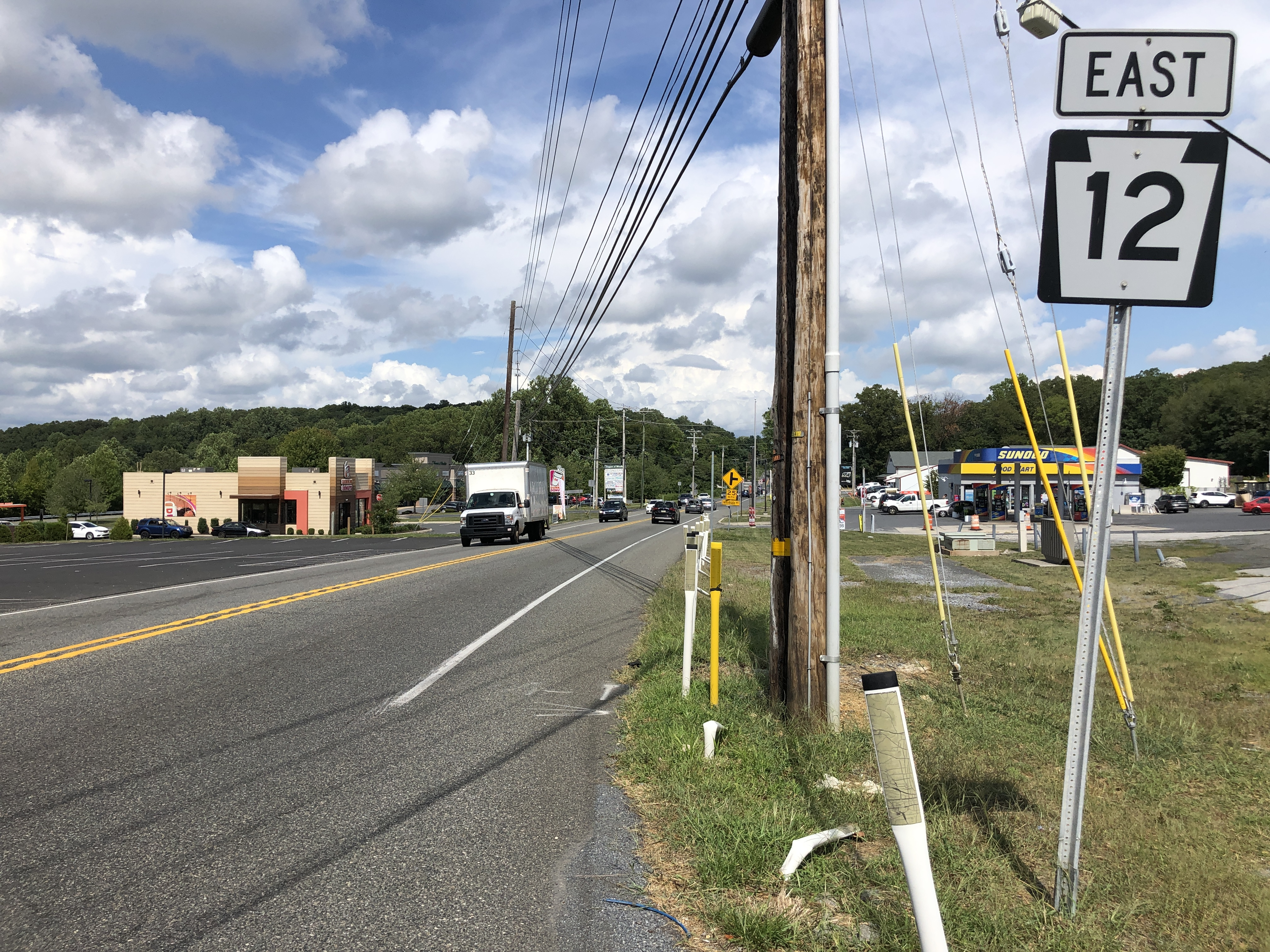
PA 12 eastbound in Alsace Township

As of 2022, there were 43.24 miles (69.59 km) of public roads in Alsace Township, of which 15.41 miles (24.80 km) were maintained by the Pennsylvania Department of Transportation (PennDOT) and 27.83 miles (44.79 km) were maintained by the township.

Pennsylvania Route 12 is the only numbered highway serving Alsace Township. It follows Pricetown Road along a southwest–northeast alignment across the northwestern portion of the township.
