= Warren Street Bypass =

Highway in Pennsylvania

The Warren Street Bypass is a limited-access bypass in the Reading area in Berks County, in the eastern part of the U.S. state of Pennsylvania. It consists of segments of:

- U.S. Route 222/U.S. Route 422 from West Lawn to Wyomissing
- Pennsylvania Route 12 from Wyomissing to Hyde Park
