= Fox Chase =

Fox Chase may refer to several places in the United States:

- Fox Chase, Berks County, Pennsylvania, a census-designated place in Muhlenberg Township, Pennsylvania
- Fox Chase, Harrisburg, a neighbourhood in Dauphin County, Pennsylvania
- Fox Chase, Kentucky, a city in Bullitt County, Kentucky
- Fox Chase, Philadelphia, a neighborhood in the city of Philadelphia, Pennsylvania
  - Fox Chase (SEPTA station), a train station in Fox Chase, Philadelphia

== Other meanings ==
- Fox Chase Cancer Center, a medical facility in Philadelphia, Pennsylvania
- The Fox Chase, a 1928 Oswald the Lucky Rabbit animated short film
- "Fox Chase", a song by Blackfoot on their album, Tomcattin'
