= Lincoln Park, Pennsylvania =

Unincorporated community in Pennsylvania, US

- Census-designated place
- Location within Pennsylvania Location within the United States
- Coordinates: 40°18′53″N 75°59′08″W
- Country: United States
- State: Pennsylvania
- County: Berks
- Township: Spring

Area
  - Total: 0.31 sq mi (0.81 km^{2})
  - Land: 0.31 sq mi (0.81 km^{2})
  - Water: 0 sq mi (0.00 km^{2})
- Elevation: 295 ft (90 m)

Population (2020)
  - Total: 1,736
  - Density: 5,522.3/sq mi (2,132.16/km^{2})
- Time zone: UTC-5 (Eastern (EST))
  - Summer (DST): UTC-4 (EDT)
- ZIP code: 19609
- Area codes: 610 and 484
- FIPS code: 42-43496
- GNIS feature ID: 1179378

Lincoln Park is a census-designated place in Spring and Cumru Townships in Berks County, Pennsylvania, United States. It is located between the community of West Wyomissing and the borough of Shillington. As of the 2010 census, the population was 1,615 residents.

== Demographics ==
Historical population
Census	Pop.	Note	%±
2020	1,736		—
U.S. Decennial Census
