= Muhlenberg Park =

Muhlenberg Park may refer to:

- Muhlenberg Park, Pennsylvania, an unincorporated community in Muhlenberg Township, Berks County, Pennsylvania
- Muhlenberg Park (Washington, D.C.), a small public park in northwest Washington, D.C., where the Peter Muhlenberg Memorial is located
