= Colony Park =

Colony Park may refer to:

- Colony Park, Pennsylvania
- Colony Park F.C., Scottish football club
- Mercury Colony Park, full-sized station wagon
