= Gouglersville, Pennsylvania =

Unincorporated community in Pennsylvania, US

- Census-designated place
- Location within Pennsylvania Location within the United States
- Coordinates: 40°16′25″N 76°01′09″W
- Country: United States
- State: Pennsylvania
- County: Berks
- Townships: Spring, Cumru, Brecknock

Area
  - Total: 1.37 sq mi (3.54 km^{2})
  - Land: 1.37 sq mi (3.54 km^{2})
  - Water: 0 sq mi (0.00 km^{2})
- Elevation: 748 ft (228 m)

Population (2020)
  - Total: 585
  - Density: 427.6/sq mi (165.09/km^{2})
- Time zone: UTC-5 (Eastern (EST))
  - Summer (DST): UTC-4 (EDT)
- ZIP code: 19608
- Area codes: 610 and 484
- FIPS code: 42-30192
- GNIS feature ID: 1175859

Gouglersville is a census-designated place in Spring, Cumru, and Brecknock townships, Berks County, Pennsylvania, United States. It is located at the intersection of Old Lancaster Pike, Vermont Road, Gouglersville Road, and Mohns Hill Road, a short distance east of an interchange from U.S. Route 222 and approximately 3.6 miles (5.8 km) from Mohnton. As of the 2010 census, the population was 548 residents.

== Demographics ==
Historical population
Census	Pop.	Note	%±
2020	585		—
U.S. Decennial Census
