= John N. Wenrich =

John N. Wenrich (January 29, 1917 in Mohnton, Berks County, Pennsylvania – April 21, 2011 in Wyomissing) was a 20th-century American artist of the "Pennsylvania Impressionism" style.

Wenrich graduated from the Mohnton High School in 1934 and was a magna cum laude graduate from Kutztown University of Pennsylvania in 1939, with a degree in Art Education. He began his career as a public school art teacher in the Pottsgrove School District in Montgomery County, Pennsylvania and worked on a master's degree at Columbia University in New York. Wenrich then assumed supervision of art education in the Mohnton schools. His teaching career was interrupted by service in World War II from 1943 to 1945. Returning from the war as a first lieutenant, Wenrich worked briefly for the Kresge Company and then became director of advertising and marketing services for the Glen-Gery Corporation of Reading, Pennsylvania.

Wenrich continued his education and work in oil painting, studying at the Art Students League of New York with John Howard Sanden and others. He also made several trips to Arizona to study at the Southwest Art School. He graduated from the Portrait Institute of America. After retiring from the corporate world in 1982, he returned to landscape painting, his first love.

Wenrich's work continued to focus on painting impressionistic landscapes in oils of rural Berks County, Pennsylvania farms, hills and fields. His work is known for bright but natural colors, dramatic skies, and layered perspectives. He is considered in the style of the Pennsylvania Impressionist movement, associated with such artists as Walter Baum, Arthur Meltzer, and Edward Willis, and centered in neighboring Bucks County, Pennsylvania, and in particular, the small town of New Hope, Pennsylvania.

A retrospective of Wenrich's work sponsored by the Pennsylvania Council on the Arts, and featuring nearly sixty of his oil paintings, was held from September 10 – October 10, 2010 at the Yocum Institute for Arts Education in Wyomissing, Pennsylvania (Press release of the Yocum Institute for Arts Education, September 10, 2010). He maintained his membership in the American Portrait Society, as well as in the local Berks County Art Alliance, until his death.

According to his obituary in the Reading Eagle, Wenrich died in his residence in Wyomissing on April 21, 2011 (Reading Eagle, April 22, 2011, page B6).
