= Springmont, Pennsylvania =

Unincorporated community in Pennsylvania, US

- Census-designated place
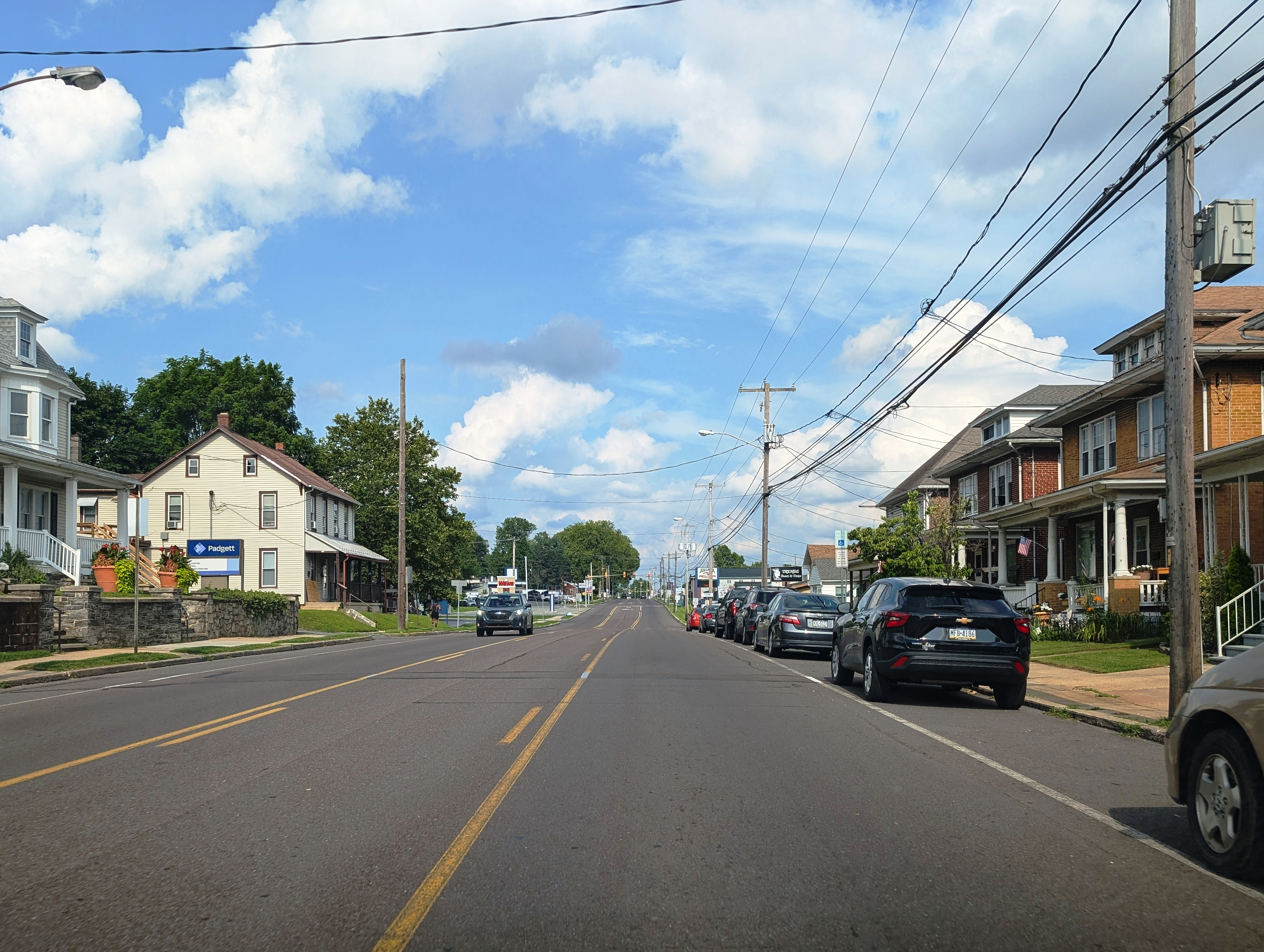
- US 422 eastbound through Springmont

- Location within Pennsylvania Location within the United States
- Coordinates: 40°19′35″N 75°59′59″W
- Country: United States
- State: Pennsylvania
- County: Berks
- Township: Spring
- Elevation: 351 ft (107 m)

Population (2020)
  - Total: 792
- Time zone: UTC-5 (Eastern (EST))
  - Summer (DST): UTC-4 (EDT)
- ZIP code: 19609
- Area codes: 610 and 484
- GNIS feature ID: 1188303

Springmont is a census-designated place in Spring Township, Berks County, Pennsylvania, United States. It is located along U.S. Route 422 near the community of West Wyomissing. As of the 2010 census, the population was 724 residents.
