= Penn State Berks (CDP), Pennsylvania =

Coordinates: 40.358989°N 75.972291°W

Penn State Berks
- CDP
- Interactive map of Penn State Berks
- Country: United States
- State: Pennsylvania
- County: Berks

Population (2020)
  - Total: 668
- Time zone: UTC-5 (Eastern (EST))
  - Summer (DST): UTC-4 (EDT)

Penn State Berks, Pennsylvania is a census-designated place (CDP) in Spring Township, Berks County, Pennsylvania, United States. It is located near the campus to Penn State Berks, approximately one mile (1.6 km) northeast of the community of Colony Park, just outside of the city of Reading. The CDP is located adjacent to U.S. Route 222. As of the 2020 census, the population was 668 residents.

== Demographics ==
Historical population
Census	Pop.	Note	%±
2020	668		—
U.S. Decennial Census
