= Antietam School District =

School district in Pennsylvania

Coordinates: 40.347901°N 75.867826°W

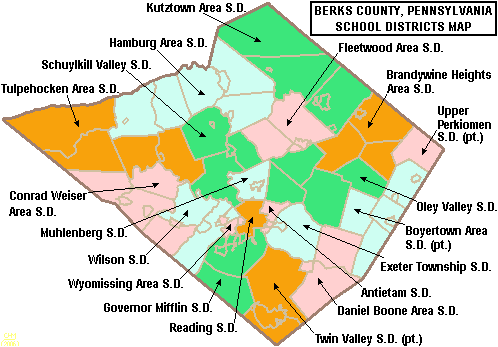

Address
- 100 Antietam Road Reading, Berks County, Pennsylvania, 19606; United States

District information
- Type: Public

Students and staff
- District mascot: Mountaineers

Other information
- Website: http://www.antietamsd.org/

The Antietam School District is a diminutive, suburban public school district that serves the Borough of Mount Penn and Lower Alsace Township in Berks County, Pennsylvania. It encompasses approximately 5 square miles (13 km^{2}). According to a federal census, it served a resident population of 7,494. In 2009, the district residents’ per capita income was $22,716, while the median family income was $49,511. In the Commonwealth, the median family income was $49,501 and the United States median family income was $49,445, in 2010.

Antietam School District operates three schools: Antietam High School (9th–12th), Kerry C. Hoffman Intermediate School (4th–8th) and Stony Creek Elementary School (K-3rd).

== Extracurriculars ==
Antietam School District offers a variety of clubs, activities and interscholastic athletics. Antietam School District and Exeter Township School District operate a cooperative sports agreement for 11 sports for both boys and girls, including football, wrestling, swimming and diving and cross country. Costs are significant. The program started in 1985–1986 school year.

=== Sports ===
The District funds:

Boys

- Baseball - A
- Basketball- A
- Bowling - AAAA
- Cross country (with ETSD)
- Football (with MSD)
- Golf - AA
- Indoor Track and Field (with ETSD)
- Lacrosse - (with ETSD)
- Soccer JV/V - A
- Swimming and Diving - (with ETSD)
- Track and Field (with ETSD)
- Volleyball - AA
- Wrestling - (with ETSD)

Girls

- Basketball - A
- Bowling - AAAA
- Cross country (with ETSD)
- Field Hockey (with ETSD)
- Golf - AA
- Indoor Track and Field (with ETSD)
- Lacrosse - (with ETSD)
- Soccer (Fall) - A
- Softball - A
- Swimming and Diving - (with ETSD)
- Girls' Tennis - AA
- Track and Field (with ETSD)
- Volleyball JV/V - A

Middle School Sports:

Boys

- Baseball
- Basketball
- Soccer

Girls

- Basketball
- Field Hockey
- Soccer (Fall)
- Softball

According to PIAA directory July 2012
