= Montrose Manor, Pennsylvania =

Unincorporated community in Pennsylvania, US

- Census-designated place
- Location within Pennsylvania Location within the United States
- Coordinates: 40°18′18″N 75°59′21″W
- Country: United States
- State: Pennsylvania
- County: Berks
- Township: Spring, Cumru

Area
  - Total: 0.23 sq mi (0.60 km^{2})
  - Land: 0.23 sq mi (0.60 km^{2})
  - Water: 0 sq mi (0.00 km^{2})

Population (2020)
  - Total: 717
  - Density: 3,098/sq mi (1,196.3/km^{2})
- Time zone: UTC-5 (Eastern (EST))
  - Summer (DST): UTC-4 (EDT)
- FIPS code: 42-50748

Montrose Manor is a census-designated place in Spring and Cumru Townships in Berks County, Pennsylvania, United States. It is located along US Route 222 just north of Mohnton. In the 2010 census, the population was recorded as 604 residents.

== Demographics ==
Historical population
Census	Pop.	Note	%±
2020	717		—
U.S. Decennial Census
