= South Temple, Pennsylvania =

Unincorporated community in Pennsylvania, US

- Census-designated place
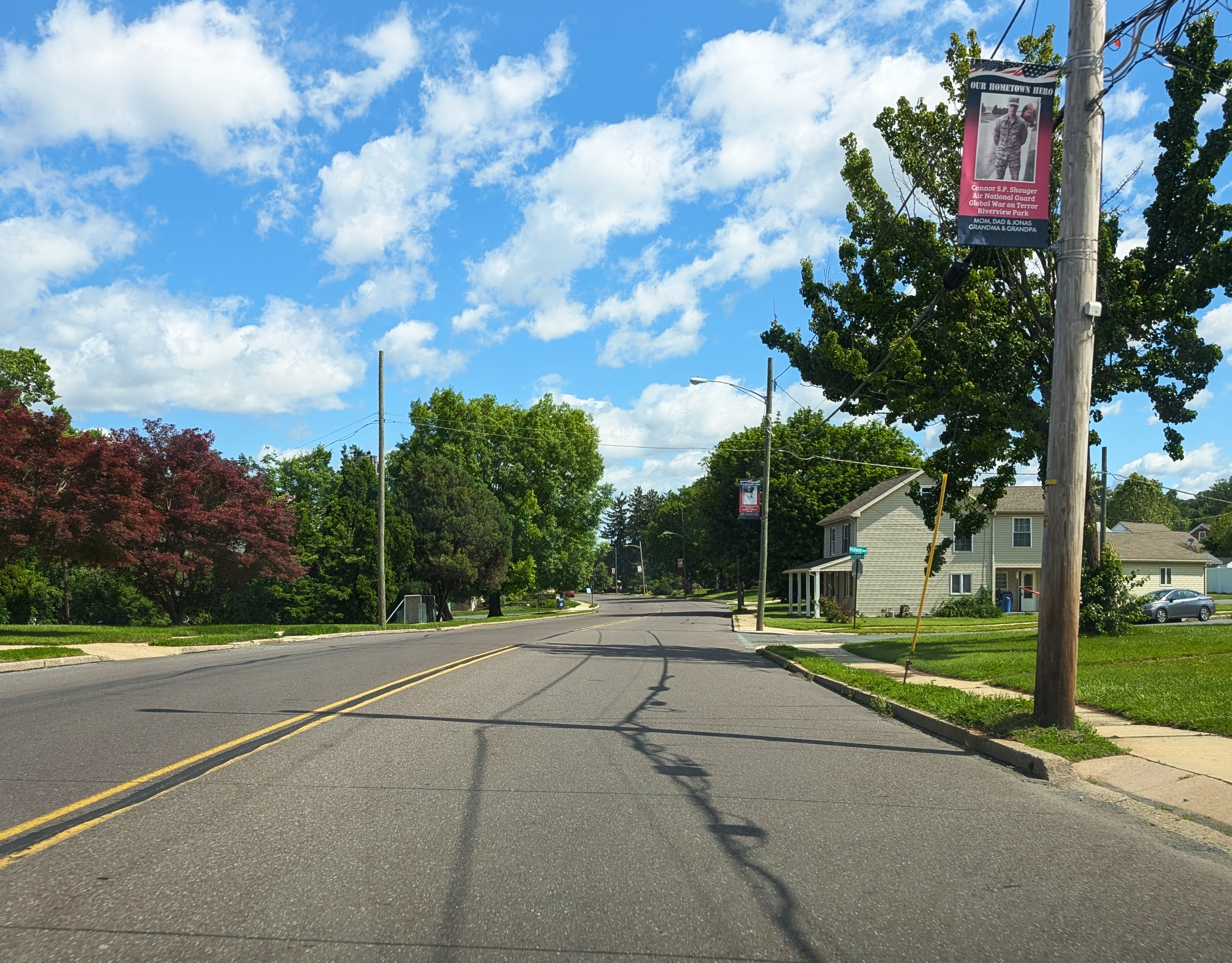
- Northbound Kutztown Road through South Temple

- Location within Pennsylvania Location within the United States
- Coordinates: 40°24′00″N 75°54′00″W
- Country: United States
- State: Pennsylvania
- County: Berks
- Township: Muhlenberg
- Elevation: 791 ft (241 m)

Population (2010)
  - Total: 1,424
- Time zone: UTC-5 (Eastern (EST))
  - Summer (DST): UTC-4 (EDT)
- ZIP code: 19560
- Area codes: 610 and 484
- GNIS feature ID: 1188114

South Temple is a census-designated place in Muhlenberg Township, Berks County, Pennsylvania, United States. It is located approximately four miles north of the city of Reading. As of the 2010 census, the population was 1,424 residents.

Originally a streetcar suburb of Reading, South Temple retains the look of a 1920s residential community, with decent-sized properties, mature trees, sidewalks, and much variation in housing styles. The community was originally serviced by a street-running trolley on Kutztown Road and an interurban trolley stop (the pavilion at 11th & Park is still standing).

== Boundaries ==
The traditionally-accepted boundaries of South Temple are the 5th Street Highway (U.S. Route 222 Business) on the west, Sharp Ave. on the south, 11th Ave on the east, and Darby Ave. on the north. South Temple lies entirely within the 19560 ZIP code and is served by the "Temple" post office. Residents use "Temple" as their mailing address. The community is served by the Muhlenberg School District.

== History ==
South Temple was started by a local developer by the name of Sharp, as a "Restricted Residential Community" with distinctive custom-built homes targeted at the emerging upper-middle class. The houses that Sharp built are known for their wonderful curb appeal and architectural character. One of his houses along 7th Avenue even won a design award. Most of the houses are modest in size and have a Craftsman Bungalow style to them, which is distinctive of the 1920s. Some houses are more notable, including five U-shaped duplex houses that are almost Mediterranean in style. During World War II, development was halted (a nationwide reality) and Sharp moved on to other projects, leaving many lots still open for development, particularly on the southern end of the town. In the 1950s, a builder by the name of Sheidy finished developing the area. Sheidy's homes are characterized as modest red-brick Cape Cods (see Cape Cod (house). Ironically, it was Sheidy (not Sharp) that built the homes along Sharp Avenue.

== Today ==
South Temple was home to two churches, both on North Temple Blvd: the Faith Evangelical Congregationalist Church, still in existence, and Epiphany Lutheran Church, now converted to a day care center. The original swimming pool at 4th & Darby Avenues served the community for many years. Originally a public pool built by William A. Sharp and named the "South Temple Pool," it became a membership organization like all local pools in Berks County. The Muhlenberg Swimming Association was open to anyone who bought a $200 "share" and paid an annual fee. It fell into disrepair due to disagreements among the board of directors, and was abandoned until its closing in 2014. A favorite summer hangout of many families in Muhlenberg Township, the pool was purchased by Windsor Industries of Hamburg, PA and reopened as a privately owned, for-profit pool in the summer of 2018. It was later managed by Aqua Pool and marketed to the Latino community. A $20 daily fee replaced the annual membership. As of spring 2023, Aqua Pool no longer existed and the pool was in the process of being demolished by the township. South Temple is just north of the Muhlenberg Township School District campus, putting the community within easy walking distance for children attending the public schools.
