= Grill, Pennsylvania =

Unincorporated community in Pennsylvania, US

- Census-designated place
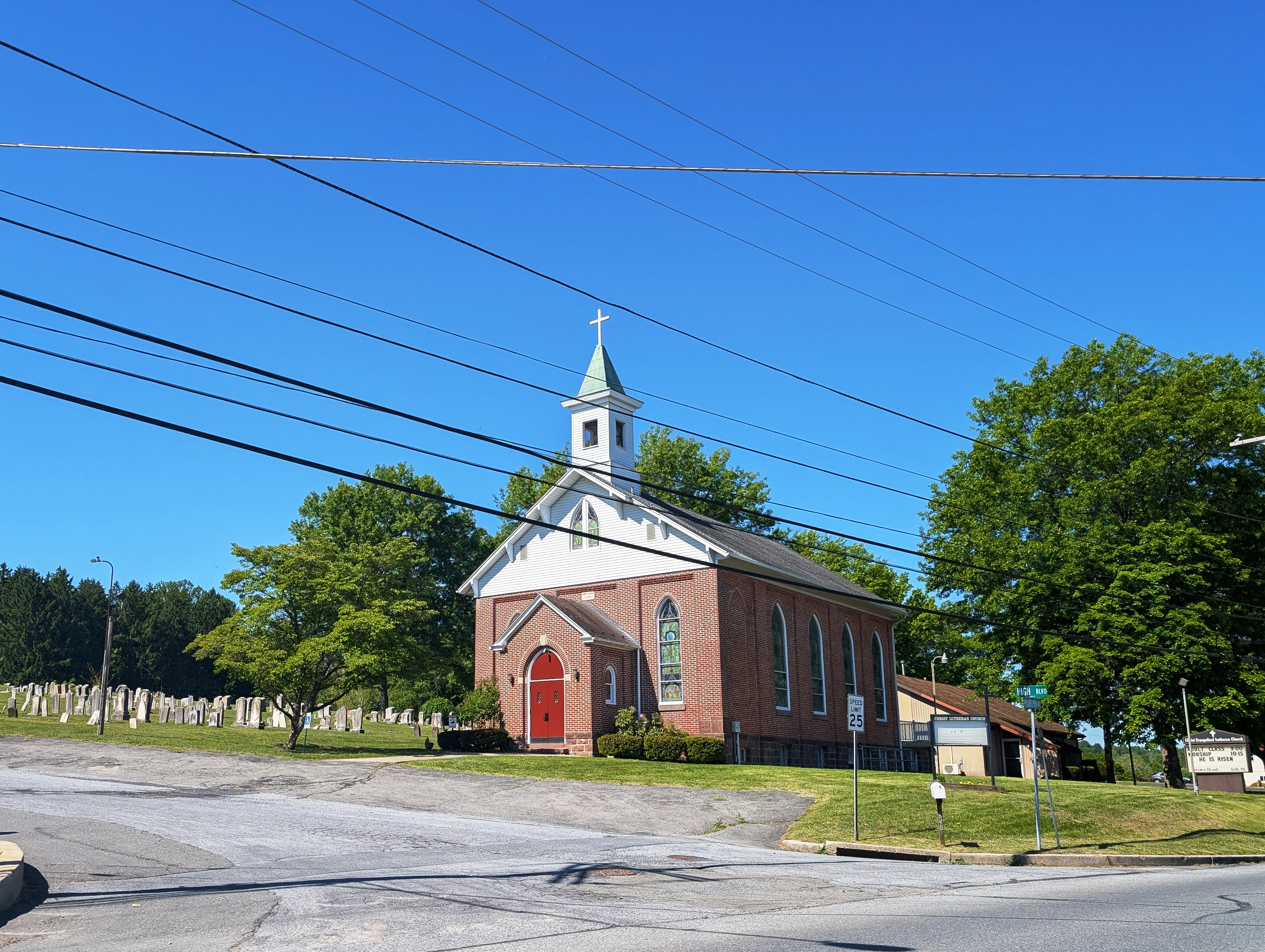
- Christ Lutheran Church in Grill

- Location within Pennsylvania Location within the United States
- Coordinates: 40°23′01″N 75°43′58″W
- Country: United States
- State: Pennsylvania
- County: Berks
- Township: Cumru

Area
  - Total: 0.78 sq mi (2.03 km^{2})
  - Land: 0.78 sq mi (2.01 km^{2})
  - Water: 0.0077 sq mi (0.02 km^{2})

Population (2020)
  - Total: 1,469
  - Density: 1,892.3/sq mi (730.64/km^{2})
- Time zone: UTC-5 (Eastern (EST))
  - Summer (DST): UTC-4 (EDT)
- ZIP Code: 19607
- Area codes: 484 and 610
- FIPS code: 42-31568

Grill is a census-designated place in Cumru Township, Berks County, Pennsylvania, United States. It is located just to the east of the borough of Kenhorst at the intersection of PA routes 625 and 724. The area is generally suburban in nature, and is served by the Governor Mifflin School District. As of the 2010 census, the population was 1,468 residents.

Historical population
Census	Pop.	Note	%±
2020	1,469		—
U.S. Decennial Census
