= Cacoosing, Pennsylvania =

Unincorporated community in Pennsylvania, US

- Unincorporated community
- Location within Pennsylvania
- Coordinates: 40°20′59″N 76°0′29″W
- Country: United States
- State: Pennsylvania
- County: Berks
- Township: Spring
- Elevation: 272 ft (83 m)
- Time zone: UTC-5 (Eastern (EST))
  - Summer (DST): UTC-4 (EDT)
- Area codes: 610 and 484
- GNIS feature ID: 1203206

Cacoosing is an unincorporated community in Spring Township in Berks County, Pennsylvania, United States. Cacoosing is located along State Hill Road at the crossing of Cacoosing Creek.

== History ==
A post office called Cacoosing was established in 1878, and remained in operation until 1902. The community was named for nearby Cacoosing Creek.
