= Berks County, Pennsylvania =

County in Pennsylvania, United States

- County
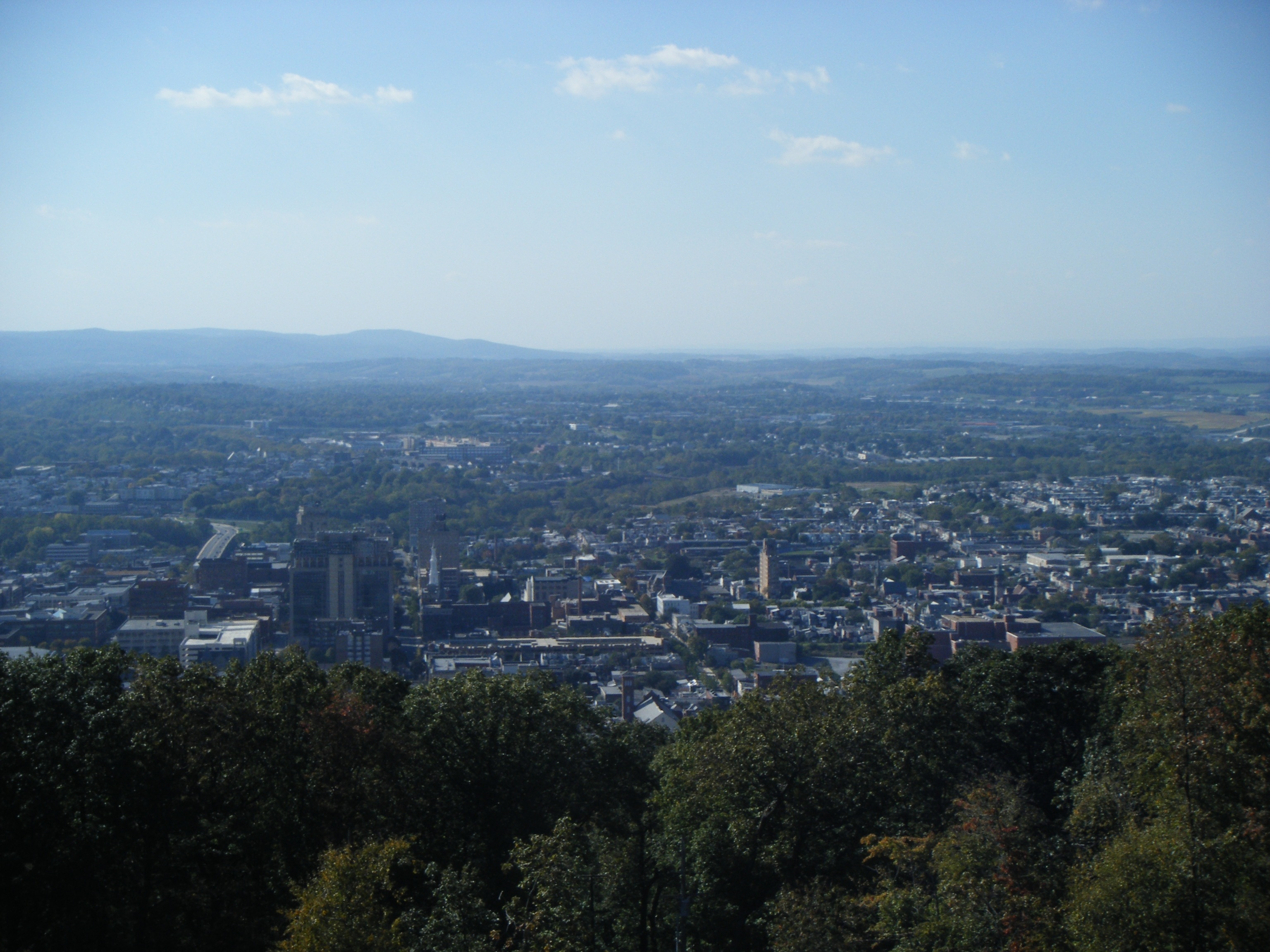
- Reading, the largest city in the county and fourth-largest in Pennsylvania, in October 2010

- Flag Seal

- Location within the U.S. state of Pennsylvania
- Coordinates: 40°25′N 75°56′W
- Country: United States
- State: Pennsylvania
- Founded: March 11, 1752
- Named for: Berkshire, England
- Seat: Reading
- Largest city: Reading

Area
  - Total: 866 sq mi (2,240 km^{2})
  - Land: 857 sq mi (2,220 km^{2})
  - Water: 9.2 sq mi (24 km^{2}) 1.1%

Population (2020)
  - Total: 428,849
  - Estimate (2025): 440,072 ▲
  - Density: 495/sq mi (191/km^{2})
- Time zone: UTC−5 (Eastern)
  - Summer (DST): UTC−4 (EDT)
- Congressional districts: 4th, 6th, 9th
- Website: www.berkspa.gov

Pennsylvania Historical Marker
- Designated: May 12, 1982

Berks County (Pennsylvania German: Barricks Kaundi) is a county in the Commonwealth of Pennsylvania. As of the 2020 census, the county's population was 428,849. The county seat is Reading, the fourth-most populous city in the state. The county is part of the South Central region of the commonwealth. (Note: Includes Lancaster, York, Berks, Montgomery, Dauphin, Bucks, Cumberland, Philadelphia, Chester, Delaware, Franklin, Lebanon, Adams and Perry Counties)

The county borders Lehigh County to its north, Schuylkill County to its north, Lebanon and Lancaster counties to its west, Chester County to its south, and Montgomery County to its east. The county is approximately 26 miles (42 km) southwest of Allentown, the state's third-largest city, and 50 miles (80 km) northwest of Philadelphia, the state's largest city.

The Schuylkill River, a 135-mile-long (217 km) tributary of the Delaware River, flows through Berks County. The county is part of the Reading, PA metropolitan statistical area (MSA), which in turn is part of the larger Philadelphia metropolitan area.

== History ==
Reading developed during the 1740s when inhabitants of northern Lancaster County sent several petitions requesting that a separate county be established. With the help of German immigrant Conrad Weiser, the county was formed on March 11, 1752, from parts of Chester County, Lancaster County, and Philadelphia County.

It was named after Berkshire the English county in which William Penn's family home lay, of which the original town of Reading is the county town and which is traditionally abbreviated "Berks". Berks County began much larger than it is today. The northwestern parts of the county went to the founding of Northumberland County in 1772 and Schuylkill County in 1811, when it reached its current size.

In 2005, Berks County was added to the Delaware Valley Planning Area due to a fast-growing population and close proximity to the other communities.

== Geography ==
According to the U.S. Census Bureau, the county has a total area of 866 square miles (2,240 km^{2}), 857 square miles (2,220 km^{2}) of which is land and 9.2 square miles (24 km^{2}) (1.1%) of which is water.

Most of the county is drained by the Schuylkill River, but an area in the northeast is drained by the Lehigh River via the Little Lehigh Creek and areas are drained by the Susquehanna River via the Swatara Creek in the northwest and the Conestoga River, which starts in Berks County between Morgantown and Elverson in the county's extreme south. It has a humid continental climate (Dfa except for some Dfb on Blue Mountain at the northern boundary.) The hardiness zone is mostly 7a with 6b in some higher northern and eastern areas.

=== Adjacent counties ===
- Schuylkill County (north)
- Lehigh County (northeast)
- Montgomery County (east)
- Chester County (southeast)
- Lancaster County (southwest)
- Lebanon County (west)

=== National protected area ===
- Hopewell Furnace National Historic Site in Elverson

=== State protected area ===
- French Creek State Park
- Nolde Forest Environmental Education Center

=== Major roads and highways ===
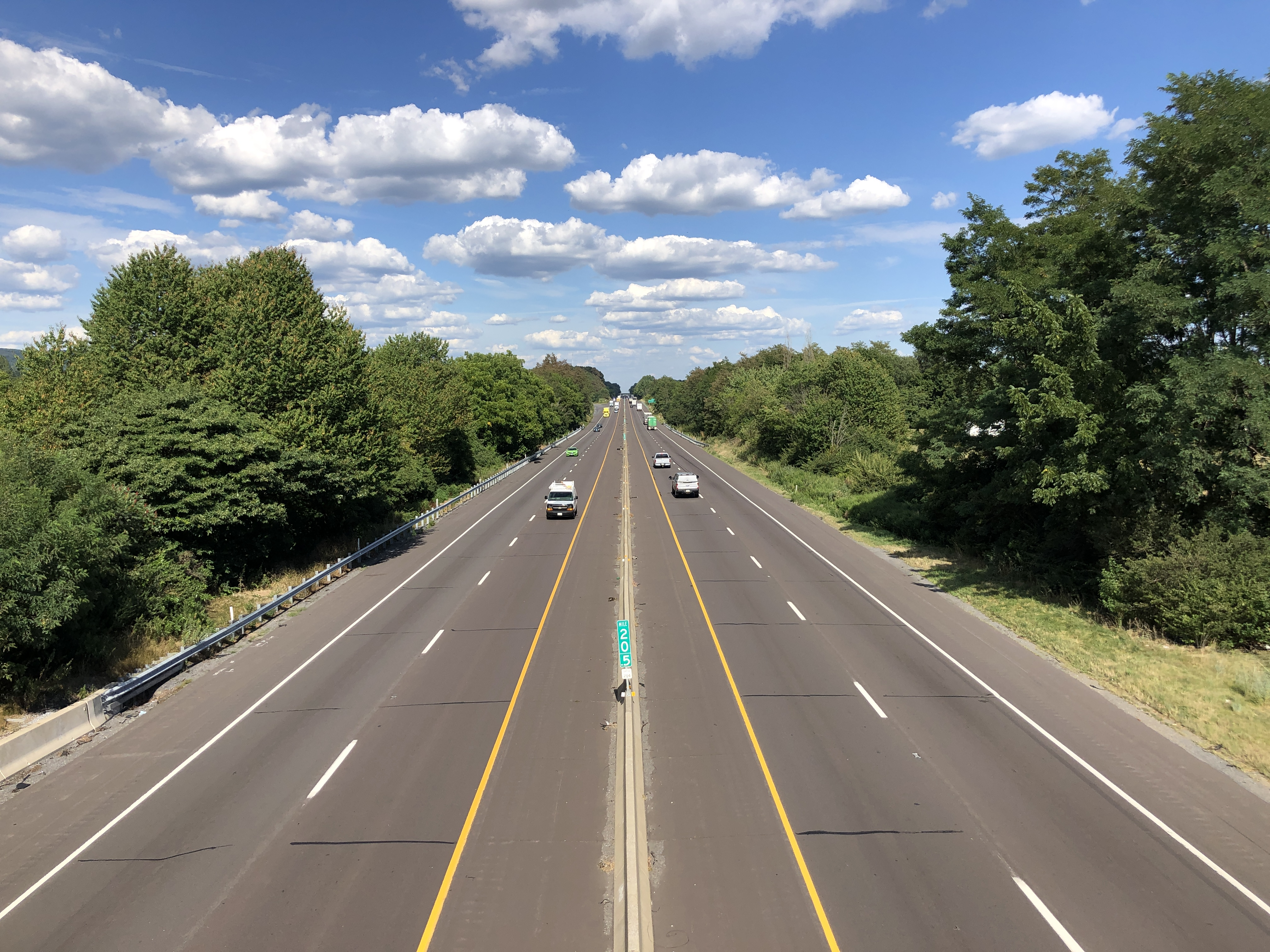
I-78/US Route 22 eastbound in Berks County

- I-76 / Penna Turnpike
- I-176
- I-78 / US 22
- US 222
- US 222 Bus.
- US 422
- US 422 Bus.
- PA 10
- PA 12
- PA 23
- PA 29
- PA 61
- PA 73
- PA 100
- PA 143
- PA 183
- PA 272
- PA 345
- PA 401
- PA 419
- PA 501
- PA 562
- PA 568
- PA 625
- PA 645
- PA 662
- PA 724
- PA 737

== Demographics ==
Historical population
Census	Pop.	Note	%±
1790	30,189		—
1800	32,407		7.3%
1810	43,146		33.1%
1820	46,275		7.3%
1830	53,152		14.9%
1840	64,569		21.5%
1850	77,129		19.5%
1860	93,818		21.6%
1870	106,701		13.7%
1880	122,597		14.9%
1890	137,327		12.0%
1900	159,615		16.2%
1910	183,222		14.8%
1920	200,854		9.6%
1930	231,717		15.4%
1940	241,884		4.4%
1950	255,740		5.7%
1960	275,414		7.7%
1970	296,382		7.6%
1980	312,509		5.4%
1990	336,523		7.7%
2000	373,638		11.0%
2010	411,442		10.1%
2020	428,849		4.2%
2025 (est.)	440,072	▲	2.6%
U.S. Decennial Census; 1790–1960 1900–1990; 1990–2000 2010–2019

=== 2020 census ===
As of the 2020 census, the county had a population of 428,849. The median age was 40.4 years. 22.2% of residents were under the age of 18 and 18.1% of residents were 65 years of age or older. For every 100 females there were 96.2 males, and for every 100 females age 18 and over there were 94.0 males age 18 and over.

The racial makeup of the county was 72.1% White, 5.1% Black or African American, 0.5% American Indian and Alaska Native, 1.5% Asian, <0.1% Native Hawaiian and Pacific Islander, 11.7% from some other race, and 9.0% from two or more races. Hispanic or Latino residents of any race comprised 23.2% of the population.

73.4% of residents lived in urban areas, while 26.6% lived in rural areas.

There were 161,485 households in the county, of which 30.6% had children under the age of 18 living in them. Of all households, 48.6% were married-couple households, 17.7% were households with a male householder and no spouse or partner present, and 25.4% were households with a female householder and no spouse or partner present. About 25.3% of all households were made up of individuals and 11.8% had someone living alone who was 65 years of age or older.

There were 170,742 housing units, of which 5.4% were vacant. Among occupied housing units, 69.7% were owner-occupied and 30.3% were renter-occupied. The homeowner vacancy rate was 1.1% and the rental vacancy rate was 6.1%.

=== Racial and ethnic composition ===
Berks County, Pennsylvania – Racial and ethnic composition Note: the US Census treats Hispanic/Latino as an ethnic category. This table excludes Latinos from the racial categories and assigns them to a separate category. Hispanics/Latinos may be of any race.
Race / Ethnicity (NH = Non-Hispanic)	Pop 1980	Pop 1990	Pop 2000	Pop 2010	Pop 2020	% 1980	% 1990	% 2000	% 2010	% 2020
White alone (NH)	294,049	307,387	317,025	316,406	291,258	94.09%	91.34%	84.85%	76.90%	67.92%
Black or African American alone (NH)	7,508	9,214	12,478	16,517	18,087	2.40%	2.74%	3.34%	4.01%	4.22%
Native American or Alaska Native alone (NH)	164	265	397	536	450	0.05%	0.08%	0.11%	0.13%	0.10%
Asian alone (NH)	1,247	2,334	3,713	5,244	6,225	0.40%	0.69%	0.99%	1.27%	1.45%
Native Hawaiian or Pacific Islander alone (NH)	x	x	57	58	61	x	x	0.02%	0.01%	0.01%
Other race alone (NH)	528	149	320	374	1,551	0.17%	0.04%	0.09%	0.09%	0.36%
Mixed race or Multiracial (NH)	x	x	3,291	4,952	11,667	x	x	0.88%	1.20%	2.72%
Hispanic or Latino (any race)	9,013	17,174	36,357	67,355	99,550	2.88%	5.10%	9.73%	16.37%	23.21%
Total	312,509	336,523	373,638	411,442	428,849	100.00%	100.00%	100.00%	100.00%	100.00%

=== 2010 census ===
As of the 2010 census, the county was 76.9% white non-Hispanic, 4.9% black, 0.3% Indian, 1.3% Asian, and 2.5% were two or more races. 16.4% of the population was of Hispanic or Latino ancestry.

There were 411,442 people, 154,356 households, and 106,532 families residing in the county. The population density was 479 inhabitants per square mile (185/km^{2}). There were 164,827 housing units at an average density of 191.9 per square mile (74.1/km^{2}).

There were 154,356 households, out of which 33.1% had children under the age of 18 living with them, 52.1% were married couples living together, 12.0% had a female householder with no husband present, and 31.0% were non-families. 24.5% of all households were made up of individuals, and 10.3% had someone living alone who was 65 years of age or older. The average household size was 2.59 and the average family size was 3.08.

In the county, the population was spread out, with 23.9% under the age of 18, 9.9% from 18 to 24, 24.4% from 25 to 44, 27.3% from 45 to 64, and 14.5% who were 65 years of age or older. The median age was 39.1 years. For every 100 females there were 95.90 males. For every 100 females age 18 and over, there were 92.70 males.

=== Income ===
According to Muninet Guide's 2010 analysis, the median household income for Berks County is $54,105.

=== Cultural communities ===
Historically there is a large Pennsylvania Dutch population. It is known as part of Pennsylvania Dutch Country. More recently there is a large Puerto Rican population centered in the city of Reading.

Berks County is home to an Old Order Mennonite community consisting of about 160 families, located in the East Penn Valley near Kutztown and Fleetwood. The Old Order Mennonites first bought land in the area in 1949. In 2012, Old Order Mennonites bought two large farms in the Oley Valley. The Old Order Mennonites in the area belong to the Groffdale Conference Mennonite Church and use the horse and buggy as transportation. There are several farms in the area belonging to the Old Order Mennonite community and meetinghouses are located near Kutztown and Fleetwood.

== Metropolitan and Combined Statistical Area ==
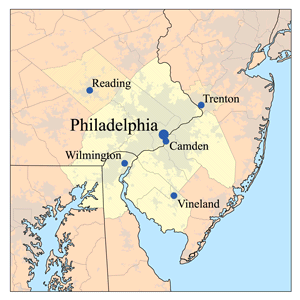
Location of Berks County in the Philadelphia metropolitan area

The Office of Management and Budget has designated Berks County as the Reading, PA Metropolitan Statistical Area (MSA). As of the 2010 U.S. census the metropolitan area is the 10th-most populous in Pennsylvania and the 128th-most populous in the U.S. with a population of 413,491.

Berks County is part of the larger Philadelphia metropolitan area, the largest in Pennsylvania and eighth-most populous in the nation with a population of 7,067,807.

== Government ==
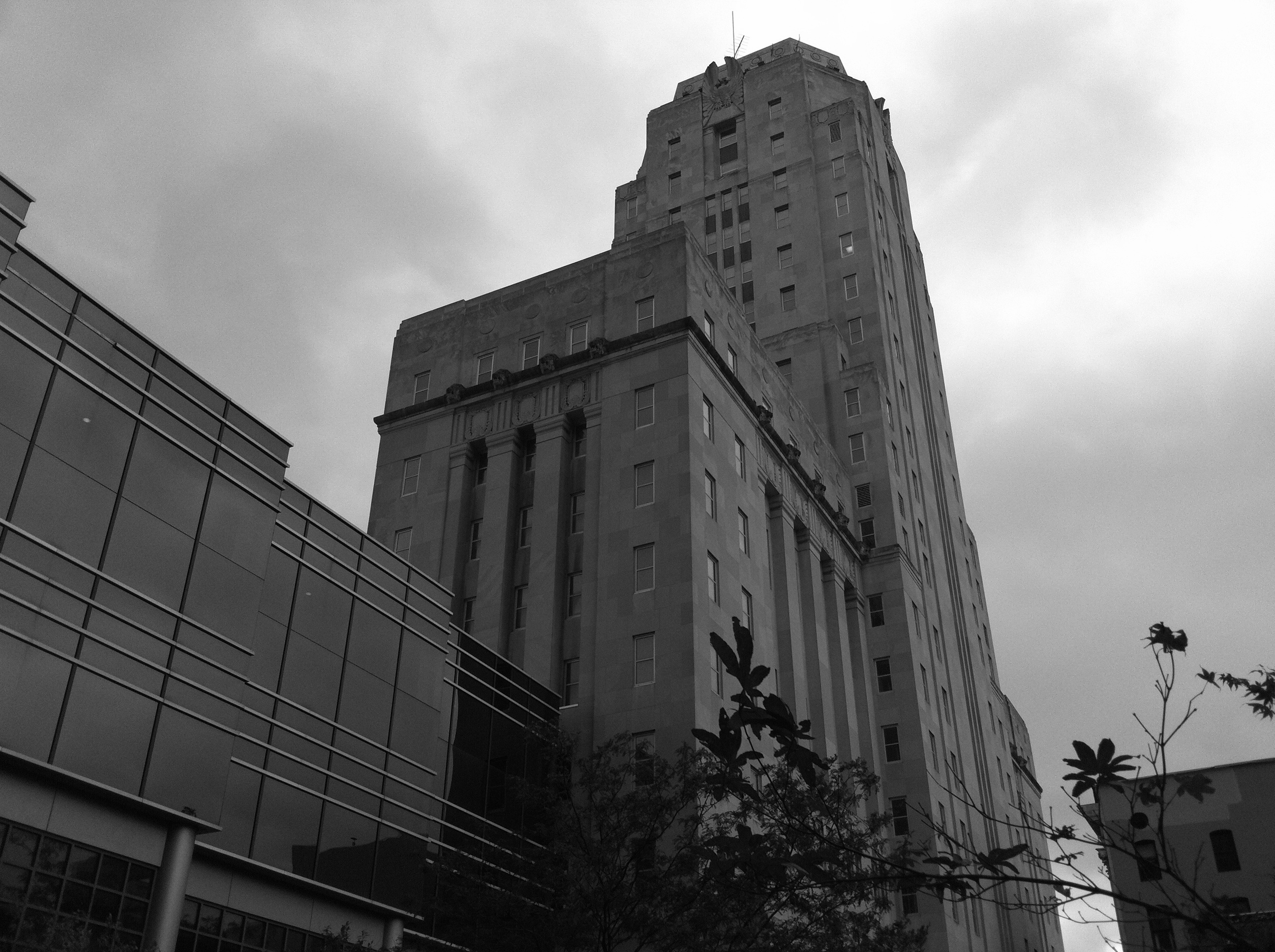
Berks County Courthouse in Reading

=== State Senate ===
- Judy Schwank, Democrat, Pennsylvania Senate, District 11
- Tracy Pennycuick, Republican, Pennsylvania Senate, District 24
- Dave Argall, Republican, Pennsylvania Senate, District 29
- Katie Muth, Democrat, Pennsylvania Senate, District 44

=== State House of Representatives ===
- Barry Jozwiak, Republican, Pennsylvania House of Representatives, District 5
- David H. Zimmerman, Republican, Pennsylvania House of Representatives, District 99
- Jamie Barton, Republican, Pennsylvania House of Representatives, District 124
- Mark Rozzi, Democrat, Pennsylvania House of Representatives, District 126
- Manny Guzman Jr., Democrat, Pennsylvania House of Representatives, District 127
- Mark Gillen, Republican, Pennsylvania House of Representatives, District 128
- Johanny Cepeda-Freytiz, Democrat, Pennsylvania House of Representatives, District 129
- David Maloney, Republican, Pennsylvania House of Representatives, District 130

=== U.S. House of Representatives ===
- Madeleine Dean, Democrat, Pennsylvania's 4th congressional district
- Chrissy Houlahan, Democrat, Pennsylvania's 6th congressional district
- Dan Meuser, Republican, Pennsylvania's 9th congressional district

U.S. Senate

- Dave McCormick, Republican
- John Fetterman, Democrat

== Politics ==
As of September 21, 2023, there were 253,186 registered voters in Berks County.

- Republican: 107,690 (42.53%)
- Democratic: 104,430 (41.24%)
- Independent: 30,154 (11.91%)
- Minor parties: 10,912 (4.31%)

Berks County is strongly Republican, but is still competitive. As of 2023, the Republican Party maintained a total registration edge over Democrats in Berks County. At the top of the Pennsylvania ticket in November 2022, Berks County split its votes, supporting Democrat Josh Shapiro for governor and Republican Mehmet Oz for U.S. Senate. The last Democratic presidential candidate to win the county was Barack Obama in 2008.

United States presidential election results for Berks County, Pennsylvania
Year	Republican		Democratic		Third party(ies)	
Year	No.	%	No.	%	No.	%
1880	9,225	34.99%	16,959	64.32%	181	0.69%
1884	9,587	36.46%	16,484	62.68%	226	0.86%
1888	10,626	36.65%	18,105	62.45%	261	0.90%
1892	10,077	34.76%	18,602	64.16%	312	1.08%
1896	14,318	43.28%	18,099	54.71%	665	2.01%
1900	13,952	41.53%	19,013	56.60%	628	1.87%
1904	15,539	46.28%	16,357	48.71%	1,683	5.01%
1908	13,642	41.01%	17,381	52.25%	2,245	6.75%
1912	3,032	8.77%	16,430	47.54%	15,098	43.69%
1916	11,937	34.33%	19,267	55.41%	3,565	10.25%
1920	22,221	47.69%	18,361	39.41%	6,009	12.90%
1924	28,186	51.35%	17,220	31.37%	9,487	17.28%
1928	47,073	64.03%	18,960	25.79%	7,481	10.18%
1932	27,073	37.07%	29,763	40.76%	16,187	22.17%
1936	26,699	30.23%	56,907	64.43%	4,721	5.34%
1940	32,111	36.93%	53,301	61.31%	1,530	1.76%
1944	35,274	43.33%	43,889	53.91%	2,247	2.76%
1948	35,608	43.57%	43,075	52.71%	3,043	3.72%
1952	51,720	52.42%	45,874	46.49%	1,074	1.09%
1956	57,258	57.30%	42,349	42.38%	320	0.32%
1960	61,743	54.78%	50,572	44.87%	391	0.35%
1964	36,726	33.19%	73,444	66.38%	476	0.43%
1968	50,623	46.48%	49,877	45.79%	8,424	7.73%
1972	66,172	62.35%	36,563	34.45%	3,392	3.20%
1976	54,452	50.63%	50,994	47.41%	2,107	1.96%
1980	60,576	56.41%	36,449	33.94%	10,360	9.65%
1984	74,605	65.94%	37,849	33.45%	691	0.61%
1988	70,153	62.39%	41,040	36.50%	1,251	1.11%
1992	52,939	40.29%	46,031	35.03%	32,437	24.68%
1996	56,289	46.25%	49,887	40.99%	15,542	12.77%
2000	71,273	52.68%	59,150	43.72%	4,874	3.60%
2004	87,122	52.97%	76,309	46.39%	1,056	0.64%
2008	80,513	44.60%	97,047	53.76%	2,951	1.63%
2012	84,702	49.63%	83,011	48.64%	2,963	1.74%
2016	96,626	52.49%	78,437	42.61%	9,022	4.90%
2020	109,926	53.22%	93,116	45.08%	3,511	1.70%
2024	116,677	55.45%	91,125	43.31%	2,624	1.25%

United States Senate election results for Berks County, Pennsylvania1
Year	Republican		Democratic		Third party(ies)	
Year	No.	%	No.	%	No.	%
1994	52,431	57.39%	33,848	37.05%	5,081	5.56%
2000	78,297	59.92%	48,998	37.50%	3,374	2.58%
2006	52,806	45.24%	63,915	54.76%	0	0.00%
2012	78,679	47.40%	84,403	50.85%	2,909	1.75%
2018	68,159	47.16%	73,714	51.00%	2,660	1.84%
2024	108,058	53.06%	89,063	43.74%	6,521	3.20%

United States Senate election results for Berks County, Pennsylvania3
Year	Republican		Democratic		Third party(ies)	
Year	No.	%	No.	%	No.	%
1992	64,062	50.14%	56,993	44.61%	6,704	5.25%
1998	52,787	66.96%	22,282	28.26%	3,766	4.78%
2004	85,729	56.67%	57,482	38.00%	8,059	5.33%
2010	62,534	55.58%	49,971	44.42%	0	0.00%
2016	95,466	53.21%	77,028	42.93%	6,919	3.86%
2022	78,019	50.39%	71,349	46.08%	5,456	3.52%

Pennsylvania Gubernatorial election results for Berks County
Year	Republican		Democratic		Third party(ies)	
Year	No.	%	No.	%	No.	%
1970	30,351	36.27%	49,239	58.84%	4,095	4.89%
1974	34,788	41.68%	47,359	56.74%	1,322	1.58%
1978	43,286	53.88%	36,252	45.13%	794	0.99%
1982	46,830	55.30%	36,930	43.61%	925	1.09%
1986	43,849	54.11%	36,147	44.61%	1,038	1.28%
1990	29,589	38.09%	47,887	61.65%	203	0.26%
1994	48,857	52.91%	30,740	33.29%	12,741	13.80%
1998	49,716	62.51%	21,336	26.83%	8,479	10.66%
2002	43,790	42.71%	56,592	55.20%	2,146	2.09%
2006	50,096	42.84%	66,837	57.16%	0	0.00%
2010	66,758	59.34%	45,746	40.66%	0	0.00%
2014	50,005	49.10%	51,840	50.90%	0	0.00%
2018	65,756	45.53%	76,136	52.72%	2,534	1.75%
2022	72,185	46.63%	78,757	50.87%	3,876	2.50%

The first time since 1964 that a Democrat carried Berks in a Presidential election occurred in 2008, with Barack Obama receiving 53.9% of the vote to John McCain's 44.7%. The other three statewide winners (Rob McCord for treasurer, Jack Wagner for auditor general, and Tom Corbett for attorney general) also carried it. While Republicans have controlled the commissioner majority most of the time and continue to control most county row offices, Democrats have become more competitive in Berks in recent years. In the 2012 Presidential election, Mitt Romney carried the county by approximately a one-percent margin, 49.6% to 48.6%, however, in 2016, Donald Trump carried Berks by a much larger margin of 52.9% to 42.7%.

Chart of Voter Registration
1. Republican (42.5%)
2. Democratic (41.4%)
3. Independent (11.8%)
4. Other Parties (4.32%)

== Education ==
=== Colleges and universities ===
- Albright College
- Alvernia University
- Kutztown University
- Penn State Berks
- Reading Area Community College

=== Public school districts ===
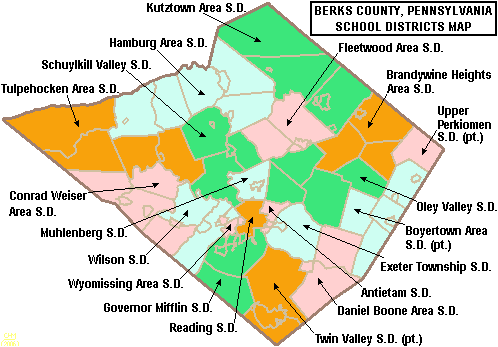
Map of Berks County's public school districts

School districts include:

- Antietam School District
- Boyertown Area School District
- Brandywine Heights Area School District
- Conrad Weiser Area School District
- Daniel Boone Area School District
- Exeter Township School District
- Fleetwood Area School District
- Governor Mifflin School District
- Hamburg Area School District
- Kutztown Area School District
- Muhlenberg School District
- Oley Valley School District
- Reading School District
- Schuylkill Valley School District
- Tulpehocken Area School District
- Twin Valley School District
- Upper Perkiomen School District
- Wilson School District
- Wyomissing Area School District

=== Private high schools ===
- Berks Catholic High School in Reading
- Berks Christian School in Birdsboro
- Blue Mountain Academy, a Seventh-day Adventist boarding school in Tilden Township
- Conestoga Christian School in Morgantown, Pennsylvania
- Fairview Christian School in Reading
- Gateway Christian School in Mertztown
- Lighthouse Christian Academy in Lyons
- The King's Academy in Mohrsville
- Pine Forge Academy, a Seventh-day Adventist boarding school in Pine Forge

=== Technical and trade schools ===
- Berks Technical Institute
- Pace Institute
- Reading Hospital School of Nursing
- Berks Career and Technology Center (east campus in Oley, west campus in Leesport)

=== Libraries ===
In July 1985, after a year long study, a 97-page report titled Public Library Service for Berks County was released, recommending a "county-wide system of federated libraries...and to operate a center supportive of all the libraries in the system." Following this report, the Berks County Public Library System was officially established by the Berks County Board of Commissioners in 1986.

The Berks County Public Library (BCPL) system consists of 19 member libraries and 4 branches:

- Bernville Area Community Library
- Bethel-Tulpehocken Public Library
- Boone Area Library
- Boyertown Community Library
- Brandywine Community Library
- Exeter Community Library
- Fleetwood Area Public Library
- Hamburg Public Library
- Kutztown Community Library
- Mifflin Community Library
- Muhlenberg Community Library
- Reading Public Library - Main Branch
- Reading Public Library - Northeast Branch
- Reading Public Library - Northwest Branch
- Reading Public Library - Southeast Branch
- Robesonia Community Library
- Schuylkill Valley Community Library
- Sinking Spring Public Library
- Spring Township Library
- Village Library
- Wernersville Public Library
- West Lawn-Wyomissing Hills Library
- Womelsdorf Community Library

During the first year, the 12 libraries that were founding charter members served 45,000 registered borrowers and circulated over 470,000 items. Two branches in the county (Hamburg Public Library and the main branch of the Reading Public Library) were funded by grants from Andrew Carnegie. At this time, county funding for the library system totaled just $125,000.

As the system grew with 4 more libraries joining, the funding from the county grew to $325,000 in the year 1990. In 1990, the first public access computers were installed in System member libraries. One year later, the system took over control of a county bookmobile.

Several significant things for the library system took place in the year 1996 for its 10 year anniversary. During this year, the library system began van deliveries between branches and initiated involvement in the first ever state-wide Summer Reading program, Pennsylvania Patchwork. The system also began to offer access to the Internet. The following year, the first library automation network was installed across the system to connect the branch's collections.

In the year 2000, the number of member libraries totaled 19. The BCPL system was awarded a $225,500 grant from the Bill and Melinda Gates Foundation. These funds were used to expand the internet access points available in the libraries and create a training lab at Reading Public Library. E-books and e-book readers were added to the system in this year as well. In 2002, after a year of development, a children's bookmobile called the Bookasaurus began to visit local preschool programs. In 2008, the system added an Early Literacy Station (ELS) to every branch in the system, which is a specific pre-loaded computer tailored to younger patrons' needs and interests. The following year, due to state-subsidized funding cuts, the county bookmobile ceased operations after more than 30 years. During this year, however, the library hosted its most successful Summer Reading yet, with over half a million books read over the course of the program.

The library system began to participate in the 1000 Books Before Kindergarten initiative in 2014.

As of 2020, the system has over 130,000 registered cardholders with a collection size of just under 950,000 items.

== Arts and culture ==
Reading Public Museum in Reading is an art, science, and history museum.

The Reading Buccaneers Drum and Bugle Corps are an all-age drum corps based in Berks County. Founded in 1957, the corps is a charter member Drum Corps Associates and an 11-time DCA World Champion.

Reading is home to Berks Opera Company, founded in 2007 as Berks Opera Workshop.

There are two Pennsylvania state parks and one natural area in Berks County.

- French Creek State Park, a former Recreational Demonstration Area, straddles the Berks and Chester County line.
- Nolde Forest Environmental Education Center is south of Reading on land once owned by Jacob Nolde, a Reading businessman and Pennsylvania environmentalist.
- Ruth Zimmerman Natural Area, part of the William Penn Forest District in Oley.

There are two Pennsylvania Historic Sites in Berks County.

- Conrad Weiser Homestead near Womelsdorf
- Daniel Boone Homestead near Birdsboro

The Old Morlatton Village in Douglassville is maintained by the Historic Preservation Trust of Berks County. The village is composed of four historic structures: White Horse Inn, George Douglass Mansion, Bridge keeper's House, and the Mouns Jones House, constructed in 1716, which is the oldest recorded building in the county.

Wyomissing is home to The Nicholas Stoltzfus Homestead, constructed in 1771 by Old Order Amish emigrants Nicholas Stoltzfus and his family. Stoltzfus was among the small group of families who fled Europe to settle in Pennsylvania, marking the Homestead as a culturally and historically significant site for the estimated one million descendants of Nicholas Stoltzfus.

West Reading in home to the annual Art on the Avenue, which reached its 25th year in 2019.

== Media ==
Berks County is home to several media outlets, including:

- Berks Community Television (BCTV)
- Reading Eagle, the daily newspaper, based in Reading and founded in 1867
- WEEU (830 AM), a radio station broadcasting news and conservative talk shows
- WFMZ-TV, an Allentown-based news channel that covers the region
- WRFY-FM (102.5 FM "Y102"), a commercial radio station licensed to serve Reading

== Communities ==
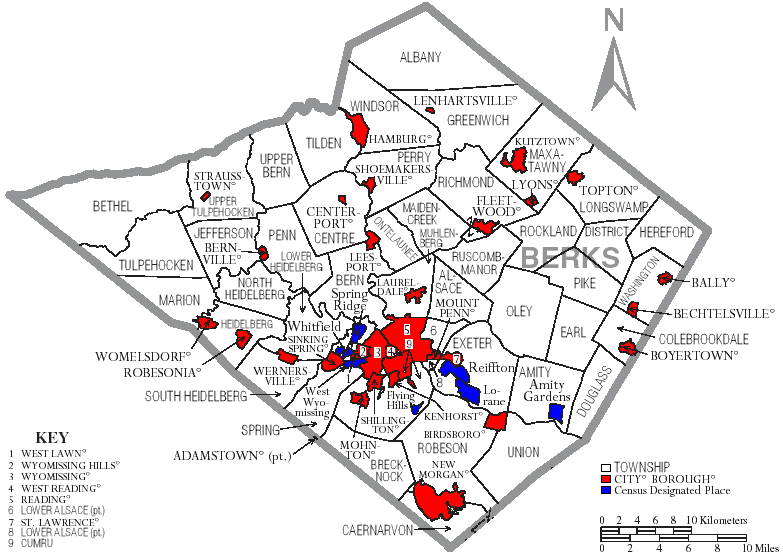
Map of Berks County with municipal labels showing cities and boroughs (in red), townships (in white), and census-designated places (in blue)

Under Pennsylvania law, there are four types of incorporated municipalities: cities, boroughs, townships, and towns. The following cities, boroughs and townships are located in Berks County:

=== City ===
- Reading (county seat)

=== Boroughs ===
- Adamstown (mostly in Lancaster County)
- Bally
- Bechtelsville
- Bernville
- Birdsboro
- Boyertown
- Centerport
- Fleetwood
- Hamburg
- Kenhorst
- Kutztown
- Laureldale
- Leesport
- Lenhartsville
- Lyons
- Mohnton
- Mount Penn
- New Morgan
- Robesonia
- St. Lawrence
- Shillington
- Shoemakersville
- Sinking Spring
- Topton
- Wernersville
- West Reading
- Womelsdorf
- Wyomissing

=== Townships ===
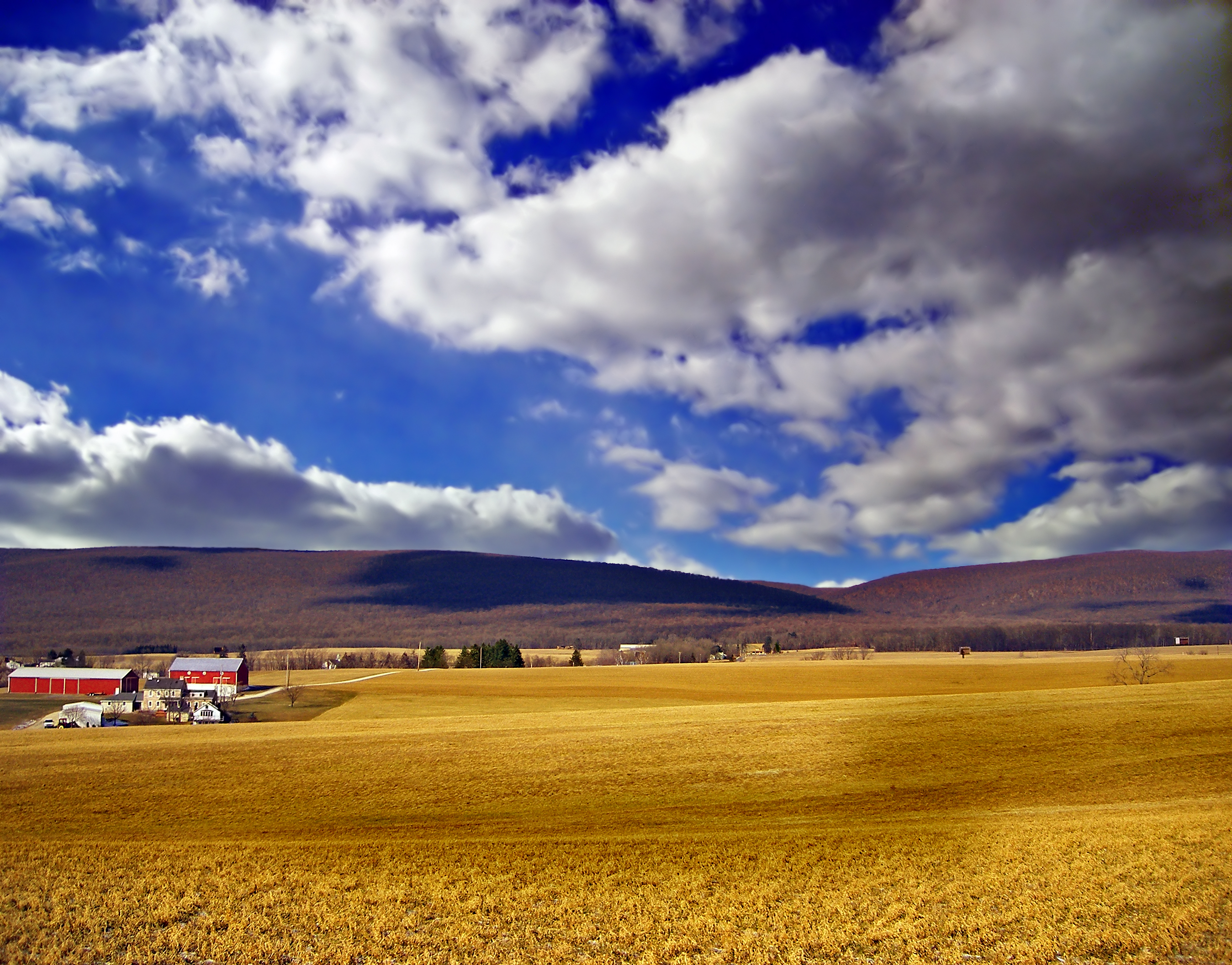
A farm in Windsor Township in January 2008

- Albany
- Alsace
- Amity
- Bern
- Bethel
- Brecknock
- Caernarvon
- Centre
- Colebrookdale
- Cumru
- District
- Douglass
- Earl
- Exeter
- Greenwich
- Heidelberg
- Hereford
- Jefferson
- Longswamp
- Lower Alsace
- Lower Heidelberg
- Maidencreek
- Marion
- Maxatawny
- Muhlenberg
- North Heidelberg
- Oley
- Ontelaunee
- Penn
- Perry
- Pike
- Richmond
- Robeson
- Rockland
- Ruscombmanor
- South Heidelberg
- Spring
- Tilden
- Tulpehocken
- Union
- Upper Bern
- Upper Tulpehocken
- Washington
- Windsor

=== Census-designated places ===
Census-designated places are geographical areas designated by the U.S. Census Bureau for the purposes of compiling demographic data. They are not actual jurisdictions under Pennsylvania law. Other unincorporated communities, such as villages, may be listed here as well.

- Alleghenyville
- Alsace Manor
- Amity Gardens
- Baumstown
- Bethel
- Blandon
- Bowers
- Colony Park
- Dauberville
- Douglassville
- Dryville
- Edenburg
- Flying Hills
- Fox Chase
- Frystown
- Gibraltar
- Gouglersville
- Greenfields
- Grill
- Hereford
- Hyde Park
- Jacksonwald
- Kempton
- Kutztown University
- Lincoln Park
- Lorane
- Maxatawny
- Mertztown
- Mohrsville
- Montrose Manor
- Morgantown
- Mount Aetna
- Muhlenberg Park
- New Berlinville
- New Jerusalem
- New Schaefferstown
- Oley
- Pennside
- Penn State Berks
- Pennwyn
- Rehrersburg
- Reiffton
- Riverview Park
- Schubert
- Shartlesville
- South Temple
- Springmont
- Spring Ridge
- Stony Creek Mills
- Stouchsburg
- Strausstown
- Temple
- Virginville
- Walnuttown
- West Hamburg
- West Lawn
- West Wyomissing
- Whitfield

=== Unincorporated communities ===
- Brownsville
- Blue Marsh
- Cacoosing
- Geigertown
- Leinbachs
- North Heidelberg
- Pine Swamp
- Plowville
- Pricetown
- Scarlets Mill
- State Hill
- Wooltown

=== Population ranking ===
The population ranking of the following table is based on the 2010 census of Berks County.

† county seat

CDP=census designated population

Rank	City/Town/etc.	Municipal type	Population (2010 Census)
1	† Reading	City	88,082
2	Wyomissing	Borough	10,461
3	Blandon	CDP	7,152
4	Shillington	Borough	5,273
5	Birdsboro	Borough	5,163
6	Kutztown	Borough	5,012
7	Whitfield	CDP	4,733
8	Hamburg	Borough	4,289
9	Lorane	CDP	4,236
10	Pennside	CDP	4,215
11	West Reading	Borough	4,212
12	Reiffton	CDP	4,178
13	Fleetwood	Borough	4,085
14	Boyertown	Borough	4,055
15	Sinking Spring	Borough	4,008
16	Laureldale	Borough	3,911
17	West Wyomissing	CDP	3,407
18	Amity Gardens	CDP	3,402
19	Jacksonwald	CDP	3,393
20	Riverview Park	CDP	3,380
21	Mount Penn	Borough	3,106
22	Mohnton	Borough	3,043
23	Kutztown University	CDP	2,918
24	Kenhorst	Borough	2,877
25	Womelsdorf	Borough	2,810
26	Flying Hills	CDP	2,568
27	Hyde Park	CDP	2,528
28	Wernersville	Borough	2,494
29	Topton	Borough	2,069
30	Robesonia	Borough	2,061
31	West Hamburg	CDP	1,979
32	Leesport	Borough	1,918
33	Temple	CDP	1,877
34	St. Lawrence	Borough	1,809
35	West Lawn	CDP	1,715
36	Fox Chase	CDP	1,622
37	Lincoln Park	CDP	1,615
38	Grill	CDP	1,468
39	South Temple	CDP	1,424
40	Muhlenberg Park	CDP	1,420
41	Shoemakersville	Borough	1,378
42	New Berlinville	CDP	1,368
43	Oley	CDP	1,282
44	Greenfields	CDP	1,170
45	Alleghenyville	CDP	1,134
46	Bally	Borough	1,090
47	Colony Park	CDP	1,076
48	Stony Creek Mills	CDP	1,045
49	Spring Ridge	CDP	1,003
50	Bernville	Borough	955
51	Bechtelsville	Borough	942
52	Hereford	CDP	930
53	Dauberville	CDP	848
54	Morgantown	CDP	826
55	Pennwyn	CDP	780
56	Springmont	CDP	724
57	Edenburg	CDP	681
58	Gibraltar	CDP	680
59	Mertztown	CDP	664
60	New Jerusalem	CDP	649
61	Montrose Manor	CDP	604
62	Stouchsburg	CDP	600
63	Gouglersville	CDP	548
64	Bethel	CDP	499
65	Walnuttown	CDP	484
T-66	Lyons	Borough	478
T-66	Alsace Manor	CDP	478
67	Shartlesville	CDP	455
68	Douglassville	CDP	448
69	Baumstown	CDP	422
70	Dryville	CDP	398
71	Centerport	Borough	387
72	Mohrsville	CDP	383
73	Frystown	CDP	380
74	Mount Aetna	CDP	354
75	Strausstown	Borough	342
76	Bowers	CDP	326
77	Rehrersburg	CDP	319
78	Virginville	CDP	309
79	Schubert	CDP	249
80	New Schaefferstown	CDP	223
81	Kempton	CDP	169
82	Lenhartsville	Borough	165
83	New Morgan	Borough	71

== Notable people ==
- William Addams, former U.S. Congressman
- Priscilla Ahn, folk musician, singer, and songwriter
- Alex Anzalone (born 1994), Detroit Lions lineman
- John Barrasso, U.S. Senator
- Douglas Carter Beane, playwright
- Chad Billingsley, former professional baseball player, Los Angeles Dodgers and Philadelphia Phillies
- Daniel Boone, American pioneer, explorer, and frontiersman
- Kenny Brightbill, professional race car driver
- Steve Burns, musician and former Blue's Clues host
- James Henry Carpenter, Civil War sailor, officer, founder of Carpenter Technology Corporation
- Jack Coggins, illustrator, author and artist, lived in Boyertown from 1948 to 2006
- Rocky Colavito, former Major League Baseball player
- Kerry Collins, professional football player (Panthers, Saints, Giants, Raiders, Titans, and Colts)
- Michael Constantine, actor, star of Room 222 and My Big Fat Greek Wedding
- Amy Cuddy, Harvard psychologist and TED Talks speaker
- Lisa Eichhorn, actress
- Wayne Ellington, NBA Basketball Player
- Carl Furillo, former professional baseball player, Brooklyn/Los Angeles Dodgers
- John Henry Gilmore, Jr., former professional football player, Chicago Bears, New Orleans Saints, and Tampa Bay Buccaneers
- Jon Gosselin, reality television personality, Jon & Kate Plus 8
- Kate Gosselin, reality television personality, Jon & Kate Plus 8
- Chris Guiliano, Olympic swimmer
- Keith Haring (1958–1990), artist
- Chad Henne, football professional football player, Miami Dolphins
- Chris Hero, professional wrestler
- Joseph Hiester, governor of Pennsylvania 1820–1823
- Tommy Hinnershitz (1912–1999), auto racing pioneer
- Chad Hurley, co-founder of YouTube
- Mildred Jordan (1901–1982), novelist
- Chip Kidd (born 1964), book jacket designer at Knopf Publishing Group
- Abraham Lincoln (1744–1786), grandfather of 16th U.S. president Abraham Lincoln
- Matt Lytle (born 1975), professional football player
- Donyell Marshall, former NBA player
- James H. Maurer (1864–1944), Labor leader and two-time Vice Presidential nominee
- Kelly McGillis, actress, [Top Gun/Witness/The Accused]
- Gordon McKellen, Jr., former U.S. figure skating champion and Hall of Fame member
- Morton L. Montgomery (1846–1933), Reading attorney and author of multiple history books about Berks County
- Lenny Moore, NFL Hall of Fame
- Thomas Morris, Democratic politician, served in the United States Senate
- Jillian Murray (b. June 4, 1989), model and actress
- Frederick Augustus Muhlenberg, architect, founder of Muhlenberg Greene Architects, American military and political leader 1887–1980
- Jacob Nolde, conservationist
- Bodo Otto, Senior Surgeon of the Continental Army during the American Revolution (1711–1787)
- William Sands, U.S. Medal of Honor recipient (Civil War)
- Martin Cruz Smith, novelist
- Carl Spaatz, World War II general
- Wallace Stevens, major American Modernist poet (1879–1955)
- Taylor Swift (born 1989), Grammy Award-winning country/pop singer-songwriter
- Ross Tucker, professional football player
- John Updike, writer, 1932–2009
- Gene Venzke (1908-1992), Olympic runner (1936 Berlin) and world record-setter in indoor mile/1500m
- Lonnie Walker, NBA player
- Gus Yatron, former U.S. Representative

== See also ==
- National Register of Historic Places listings in Berks County, Pennsylvania
