= Jacksonwald, Pennsylvania =

Unincorporated community in Pennsylvania, US

- Census-designated place
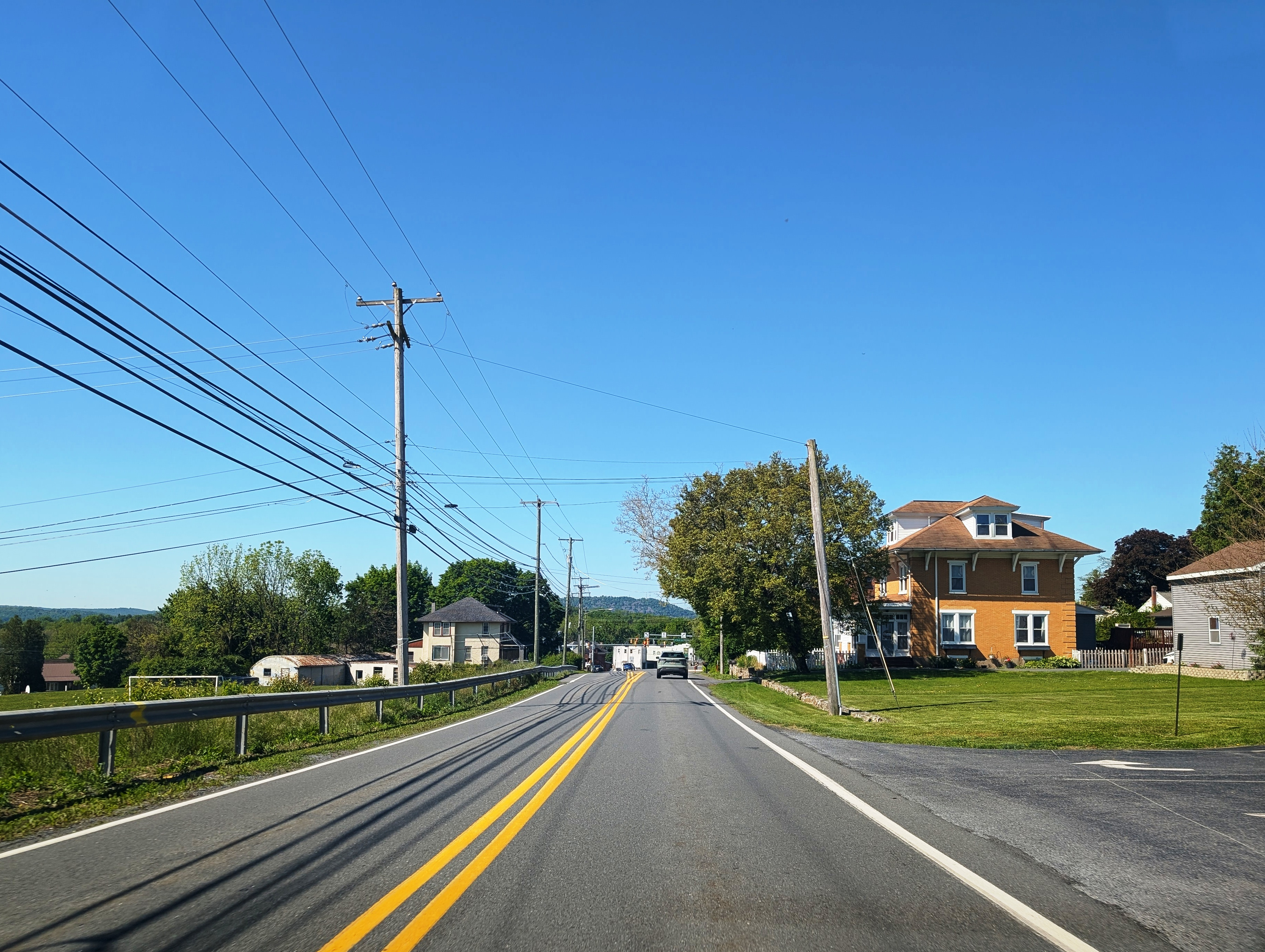
- Oley Turnpike Road in Jacksonwald

- Location within Pennsylvania Location within the United States
- Coordinates: 40°19′28″N 75°50′59″W
- Country: United States
- State: Pennsylvania
- County: Berks
- Township: Exeter

Area
  - Total: 1.77 sq mi (4.58 km^{2})
  - Land: 1.76 sq mi (4.57 km^{2})
  - Water: 0 sq mi (0.00 km^{2})

Population (2020)
  - Total: 3,246
  - Density: 1,838.8/sq mi (709.96/km^{2})
- Time zone: UTC-5 (Eastern (EST))
  - Summer (DST): UTC-4 (EDT)
- ZIP codes: 19606
- FIPS code: 42-37584

Jacksonwald is a census-designated place that is located in Exeter Township, Berks County, Pennsylvania, United States. It is situated less than a mile from the borough of St. Lawrence.

As of the 2010 census, the population was 3,393 residents.

== History ==
The Village of Jacksonwald was established in 1870, when John Jackson built the Jacksonwald Hotel on the corner of Oley Turnpike Road and Church Lane Road. The Hotel overlooked a little red schoolhouse which was also built in 1870, then restored in 1970 for its 100th anniversary. Prior to 1870, the area was once referred to as Schwarzwald, German for "black forest," because it reminded early settlers of the Black Forest region of Germany. Nevertheless, on March 27, 1967, the Jacksonwald Hotel was demolished to make way for a Boyertown headquartered bank branch, National Penn Bank.

Wald is the German word for woods or forests. Similarly to the etymology of other cities, towns and villages of the time, citizens often named their community after a prominent landmark or individual, hence the name Jacksonwald.

== Demographics ==
Historical population
Census	Pop.	Note	%±
2020	3,246		—
U.S. Decennial Census

=== 2020 census ===
As of the 2020 census, Jacksonwald had a population of 3,246. The median age was 47.5 years. 20.1% of residents were under the age of 18 and 20.0% of residents were 65 years of age or older. For every 100 females there were 92.0 males, and for every 100 females age 18 and over there were 90.0 males age 18 and over.

100.0% of residents lived in urban areas, while 0.0% lived in rural areas.

There were 1,145 households in Jacksonwald, of which 33.7% had children under the age of 18 living in them. Of all households, 66.9% were married-couple households, 12.1% were households with a male householder and no spouse or partner present, and 14.5% were households with a female householder and no spouse or partner present. About 16.8% of all households were made up of individuals and 8.6% had someone living alone who was 65 years of age or older.

There were 1,162 housing units, of which 1.5% were vacant. The homeowner vacancy rate was 0.5% and the rental vacancy rate was 0.0%.

Racial composition as of the 2020 census
Race	Number	Percent
White	2,821	86.9%
Black or African American	100	3.1%
American Indian and Alaska Native	13	0.4%
Asian	45	1.4%
Native Hawaiian and Other Pacific Islander	1	0.0%
Some other race	74	2.3%
Two or more races	192	5.9%
Hispanic or Latino (of any race)	254	7.8%
