= Whitfield, Pennsylvania =

Unincorporated community in Pennsylvania, US

- Census-designated place
- Location of Whitfield in Pennsylvania and the United States Whitfield (the United States)
- Coordinates: 40°20′04″N 76°00′27″W
- Country: United States
- State: Pennsylvania
- County: Berks
- Township: Spring

Area
  - Total: 0.7 sq mi (1.8 km^{2})
  - Land: 0.7 sq mi (1.8 km^{2})
  - Water: 0.0 sq mi (0 km^{2})
- Elevation: 341 ft (104 m)

Population (2010)
  - Total: 4,733
  - Density: 6,800/sq mi (2,600/km^{2})
- Time zone: UTC-5 (EST)
  - Summer (DST): UTC-4 (EDT)
- Area code: 610

Whitfield is a census-designated place (CDP) in Berks County, Pennsylvania, United States. The population was 4,733 at the 2010 census.

== Geography ==
Whitfield is located at 40°20′4″N 76°0′27″W (40.334392, -76.007393). According to the U.S. Census Bureau, Whitfield has a total area of 0.7 square miles (1.8 km^{2}), all land.

== Demographics ==
=== 2020 census ===
As of the 2020 census, Whitfield had a population of 4,911. The median age was 46.5 years. 20.8% of residents were under the age of 18 and 23.9% of residents were 65 years of age or older. For every 100 females there were 93.7 males, and for every 100 females age 18 and over there were 89.1 males age 18 and over.

100.0% of residents lived in urban areas, while 0.0% lived in rural areas.

There were 1,932 households in Whitfield, of which 30.5% had children under the age of 18 living in them. Of all households, 59.4% were married-couple households, 11.9% were households with a male householder and no spouse or partner present, and 23.2% were households with a female householder and no spouse or partner present. About 22.9% of all households were made up of individuals and 13.1% had someone living alone who was 65 years of age or older.

There were 1,992 housing units, of which 3.0% were vacant. The homeowner vacancy rate was 0.2% and the rental vacancy rate was 9.6%.

Racial composition as of the 2020 census
Race	Number	Percent
White	4,007	81.6%
Black or African American	172	3.5%
American Indian and Alaska Native	28	0.6%
Asian	176	3.6%
Native Hawaiian and Other Pacific Islander	2	0.0%
Some other race	192	3.9%
Two or more races	334	6.8%
Hispanic or Latino (of any race)	523	10.6%

=== 2000 census ===
At the 2000 census there were 2,952 people, 1,095 households, and 901 families living in the CDP. The population density was 4,395.1 inhabitants per square mile (1,697.0/km^{2}). There were 1,102 housing units at an average density of 1,640.7 per square mile (633.5/km^{2}). The racial makeup of the CDP was 96.31% White, 0.51% African American, 2.03% Asian, 0.71% from other races, and 0.44% from two or more races. Hispanic or Latino of any race were 1.83%.

There were 1,095 households, 35.7% had children under the age of 18 living with them, 76.1% were married couples living together, 4.2% had a female householder with no husband present, and 17.7% were non-families. 15.1% of households were made up of individuals, and 8.8% were one person aged 65 or older. The average household size was 2.68 and the average family size was 2.98.

The age distribution was 24.9% under the age of 18, 4.0% from 18 to 24, 23.7% from 25 to 44, 28.0% from 45 to 64, and 19.3% 65 or older. The median age was 43 years. For every 100 females, there were 93.2 males. For every 100 females age 18 and over, there were 90.8 males.

The median household income was $66,515 and the median family income was $72,762. Males had a median income of $51,927 versus $39,028 for females. The per capita income for the CDP was $28,666. About 0.9% of families and 2.4% of the population were below the poverty line, including 3.9% of those under age 18 and none of those age 65 or over.

Historical population
Census	Pop.	Note	%±
2000	2,952		—
2010	4,733		60.3%
2020	4,911		3.8%
