= Pennwyn, Pennsylvania =

Unincorporated community in Pennsylvania, US

- Census-designated place
- Location within Pennsylvania Location within the United States
- Coordinates: 40°17′39″N 75°58′37″W
- Country: United States
- State: Pennsylvania
- County: Berks
- Township: Cumru

Area
  - Total: 0.54 sq mi (1.39 km^{2})
  - Land: 0.53 sq mi (1.38 km^{2})
  - Water: 0.0039 sq mi (0.01 km^{2})

Population (2020)
  - Total: 888
  - Density: 1,671.5/sq mi (645.36/km^{2})
- Time zone: UTC-5 (Eastern (EST))
  - Summer (DST): UTC-4 (EDT)
- Area codes: 610 & 484
- FIPS code: 42-59304

Pennwyn is a census-designated place in Cumru Township, Berks County, Pennsylvania, United States. It is located just to the east of the borough of Mohnton. As of the 2010 census, the population was 780 residents.

== Demographics ==
Historical population
Census	Pop.	Note	%±
2020	888		—
U.S. Decennial Census
