= Riverview Park, Pennsylvania =

Unincorporated community in Pennsylvania, US

- Census-designated place
- Location within Pennsylvania Location within the United States
- Coordinates: 40°23′33″N 75°57′32″W
- Country: United States
- State: Pennsylvania
- County: Berks
- Township: Muhlenberg

Area
  - Total: 1.02 sq mi (2.65 km^{2})
  - Land: 0.99 sq mi (2.57 km^{2})
  - Water: 0.031 sq mi (0.08 km^{2})

Population (2020)
  - Total: 3,364
  - Density: 3,392.3/sq mi (1,309.79/km^{2})
- Time zone: UTC-5 (Eastern (EST))
  - Summer (DST): UTC-4 (EDT)
- FIPS code: 42-65192

Riverview Park is a census-designated place in Muhlenberg Township, Berks County, Pennsylvania, United States. It is located along the banks of the Schuylkill River, approximately 6 miles (9.7 km) north of the city of Reading. As of the 2020 census, the population was 3,364 residents.

== Demographics ==
=== 2020 census ===
As of the 2020 census, Riverview Park had a population of 3,364. The median age was 49.2 years. 18.5% of residents were under the age of 18 and 23.7% of residents were 65 years of age or older. For every 100 females there were 94.1 males, and for every 100 females age 18 and over there were 92.6 males age 18 and over.

100.0% of residents lived in urban areas, while 0.0% lived in rural areas.

There were 1,376 households in Riverview Park, of which 24.0% had children under the age of 18 living in them. Of all households, 54.2% were married-couple households, 16.0% were households with a male householder and no spouse or partner present, and 23.4% were households with a female householder and no spouse or partner present. About 27.5% of all households were made up of individuals and 14.2% had someone living alone who was 65 years of age or older.

There were 1,418 housing units, of which 3.0% were vacant. The homeowner vacancy rate was 0.9% and the rental vacancy rate was 3.5%.

Racial composition as of the 2020 census
Race	Number	Percent
White	2,396	71.2%
Black or African American	196	5.8%
American Indian and Alaska Native	16	0.5%
Asian	134	4.0%
Native Hawaiian and Other Pacific Islander	5	0.1%
Some other race	320	9.5%
Two or more races	297	8.8%
Hispanic or Latino (of any race)	628	18.7%

== Notable people ==
- Mitch Moyer, a former figure skater and coach and U.S. Figure Skating official, grew up in Riverview Park.
