= Fox Chase, Berks County, Pennsylvania =

Unincorporated community in Pennsylvania, US

- Census-designated place
- Location within Pennsylvania Location within the United States
- Coordinates: 40°23′44″N 75°57′44″W
- Country: United States
- State: Pennsylvania
- County: Berks
- Township: Muhlenberg

Population (2010)
  - Total: 1,622
- Time zone: UTC-5 (Eastern (EST))
  - Summer (DST): UTC-4 (EDT)

Fox Chase is a census-designated place in Muhlenberg Township, Berks County, Pennsylvania, United States. It is located approximately four miles north of the city of Reading along the Schuylkill River. As of the 2010 census, the population was 1,622 residents.
