= Exeter Township Senior High School =

Public school in Reading, Pennsylvania

Location
- 201 East 37th Street; Reading, Pennsylvania 19606; United States; 40.3202°N 75.8692°W

Information
- Type: Public
- Established: 1955
- School district: Exeter Township School District
- CEEB code: 394145
- Principal: Thomas A. Campbell
- Teaching staff: 82.25 (FTE)
- Enrollment: 1,309 (2023–2024)
- Student to teacher ratio: 15.91
- Campus type: Suburban
- Color: Blue White
- Mascot: Eagles
- Team name: Exeter
- Website: https://etsh.exetersd.org/

Exeter Township Senior High School is a public secondary school located in the vicinity of Reading, Pennsylvania. The school is part of the Exeter Township School District. In the 2017–2018 school year, the school reported an enrollment of 1,327 pupils in grades 9–12. The current principal is Thomas Campbell.

== History ==
The first students moved into the school building on a 40-acre (16 ha) campus in September 1955. The Junior High School was opened in 1963, but the ninth grade pupils didn't move out of the senior high building until 1969. In 1980, a new library and science wing were added and the cafeteria and shop areas were enlarged. The school underwent major renovations in 2006, including the addition of a new cafeteria and new classroom wing. The school also renovated its football stadium, Don Thomas Stadium. In 2015, a new electronic, video accessible jumbotron scoreboard was installed in the stadium thanks to a $60,000 donation from Dairy Queen. Completion of the redevelopment saw the ninth grade move back to the senior high school. Notable alumni include the great C Jones.

== Extracurricular activities ==
Exeter Township School District offers a variety of clubs, activities and an extensive sports program. The extracurricular program includes choir, drama (the school produces a play and a musical each year), fine arts, marching band, mock trial, orchestra, quiz bowl and Science Olympiad. Students produce a newspaper, a literary magazine and a yearbook.

Sports offered at the school include baseball, basketball, bowling, cheerleading, softball, cross country, football, golf, lacrosse, soccer, swimming, tennis, track and field, volleyball, and wrestling.

Exeter has State Championships in boys' volleyball (2007) and boys' bowling (2012).

== Notable alumni ==
- Taylor Bertolet, American football player
- Austin DeSanto, wrestler
- A. S. King, award-winning author
- Betsy King, professional golfer
- Michal Menet, American football player
