= Spring Ridge, Pennsylvania =

Unincorporated community in Pennsylvania, US

- Census-designated place
- Location of Spring Ridge in Pennsylvania and the United States Spring Ridge (the United States)
- Coordinates: 40°21′01″N 75°59′26″W
- Country: United States
- State: Pennsylvania
- County: Berks
- Township: Spring

Area
  - Total: 0.9 sq mi (2.3 km^{2})
  - Land: 0.9 sq mi (2.3 km^{2})
  - Water: 0.0 sq mi (0 km^{2})
- Elevation: 436 ft (133 m)

Population (2010)
  - Total: 1,003
  - Density: 1,100/sq mi (430/km^{2})
- Time zone: UTC-5 (EST)
  - Summer (DST): UTC-4 (EDT)
- ZIP code: 19610
- Area code: 610

Spring Ridge is a census-designated place (CDP) in Spring Township, Berks County, Pennsylvania, United States. The population was 1,003 at the 2010 census.

== Geography ==
Spring Ridge is located at 40°21′1″N 75°59′26″W (40.350298, -75.990584).

According to the U.S. Census Bureau, the CDP has a total area of 0.9 square miles (2.3 km^{2}), all land.

Spring Ridge is the wealthiest place in Berks County.

== Demographics ==
At the 2000 census there were 786 people, 370 households, and 251 families living in Spring Ridge. The population density was 882.1 inhabitants per square mile (340.6/km^{2}). There were 397 housing units at an average density of 445.5 per square mile (172.0/km^{2}). The racial makeup of the CDP was 92.75% White, 0.89% African American, 0.64% Native American, 4.58% Asian, 0.76% from other races, and 0.38% from two or more races. Hispanic or Latino of any race were 2.42%.

There were 370 households, 20.3% had children under the age of 18 living with them, 61.4% were married couples living together, 6.2% had a female householder with no husband present, and 31.9% were non-families. 28.1% of households were made up of individuals, and 11.1% were one person aged 65 or older. The average household size was 2.12 and the average family size was 2.59.

The age distribution was 17.4% under the age of 18, 3.2% from 18 to 24, 20.5% from 25 to 44, 32.6% from 45 to 64, and 26.3% 65 or older. The median age was 52 years. For every 100 females, there were 84.1 males. For every 100 females age 18 and over, there were 80.8 males.

The median household income was $83,345 and the median family income was $95,604. Males had a median income of $54,205 versus $63,977 for females. The per capita income for the CDP was $47,822. None of the population or families were below the poverty line.
