= Hyde Park, Berks County, Pennsylvania =

Unincorporated community in Pennsylvania, US

- Census-designated place
- Location within Pennsylvania Location within the United States
- Coordinates: 40°22′38″N 75°55′30″W
- Country: United States
- State: Pennsylvania
- County: Berks
- Township: Muhlenberg

Population (2010)
  - Total: 2,528
- Time zone: UTC-5 (Eastern (EST))
  - Summer (DST): UTC-4 (EDT)

Hyde Park is a census-designated place just outside the city of Reading in Muhlenberg Township, Berks County, Pennsylvania, United States. Its coordinates are 40°22′N 75°55′W. As of the 2010 census, the population was 2,528 residents.
