= Flying Hills, Pennsylvania =

Unincorporated community in Pennsylvania, US

- Census-designated place
- Location of Flying Hills in Pennsylvania Flying Hills (the United States)
- Coordinates: 40°16′45″N 75°55′03″W
- Country: United States
- State: Pennsylvania
- County: Berks
- Township: Cumru

Area
  - Total: 0.52 sq mi (1.34 km^{2})
  - Land: 0.51 sq mi (1.33 km^{2})
  - Water: 0.0039 sq mi (0.01 km^{2})
- Elevation: 410 ft (120 m)

Population (2020)
  - Total: 2,230
  - Density: 4,349.6/sq mi (1,679.39/km^{2})
- Time zone: UTC-5 (EST)
  - Summer (DST): UTC-4 (EDT)
- ZIP code: 19607
- Area code: 610
- FIPS code: 42-26397

Flying Hills is a census-designated place (CDP) in Cumru Township, Berks County, Pennsylvania. The population was 2,568 as of the 2010 census.

== Geography ==
Flying Hills is located at 40°16′45″N 75°55′3″W (40.279217, −75.917414). According to the U.S. Census Bureau, Flying Hills has a total area of 0.3 square miles (0.78 km^{2}), all land.

== Demographics ==
Historical population
Census	Pop.	Note	%±
2020	2,230		—
U.S. Decennial Census

At the 2000 census, there were 1,191 people, 592 households, and 333 families living in the CDP. The population density was 3,887.3 inhabitants per square mile (1,500.9/km^{2}). There were 610 housing units at an average density of 1,991.0 per square mile (768.7/km^{2}). The racial makeup of the CDP was 95.05% White, 1.60% African American, 0.17% Native American, 2.27% Asian, 0.08% Pacific Islander, and 0.84% from two or more races. Hispanic or Latino of any race were 0.76%.

There were 592 households, 18.9% had children under the age of 18 living with them, 45.9% were married couples living together, 7.8% had a female householder with no husband present, and 43.8% were non-families. 34.3% of households were made up of individuals, and 7.4% were one person aged 65 or older. The average household size was 2.01 and the average family size was 2.55.

The age distribution was 15.3% under the age of 18, 6.6% from 18 to 24, 32.2% from 25 to 44, 29.0% from 45 to 64, and 17.0% 65 or older. The median age was 42 years. For every 100 females, there were 99.8 males. For every 100 females age 18 and over, there were 98.2 males.

The median household income was $59,596 and the median family income was $86,200. Males had a median income of $55,682 versus $38,250 for females. The per capita income for the CDP was $36,822. About 0.9% of families and 1.5% of the population were below the poverty line, including 2.3% of those under age 18 and none of those age 65 or over.
