= Cumru Township, Pennsylvania =

Township in Pennsylvania, US

Cumru Township
- Township
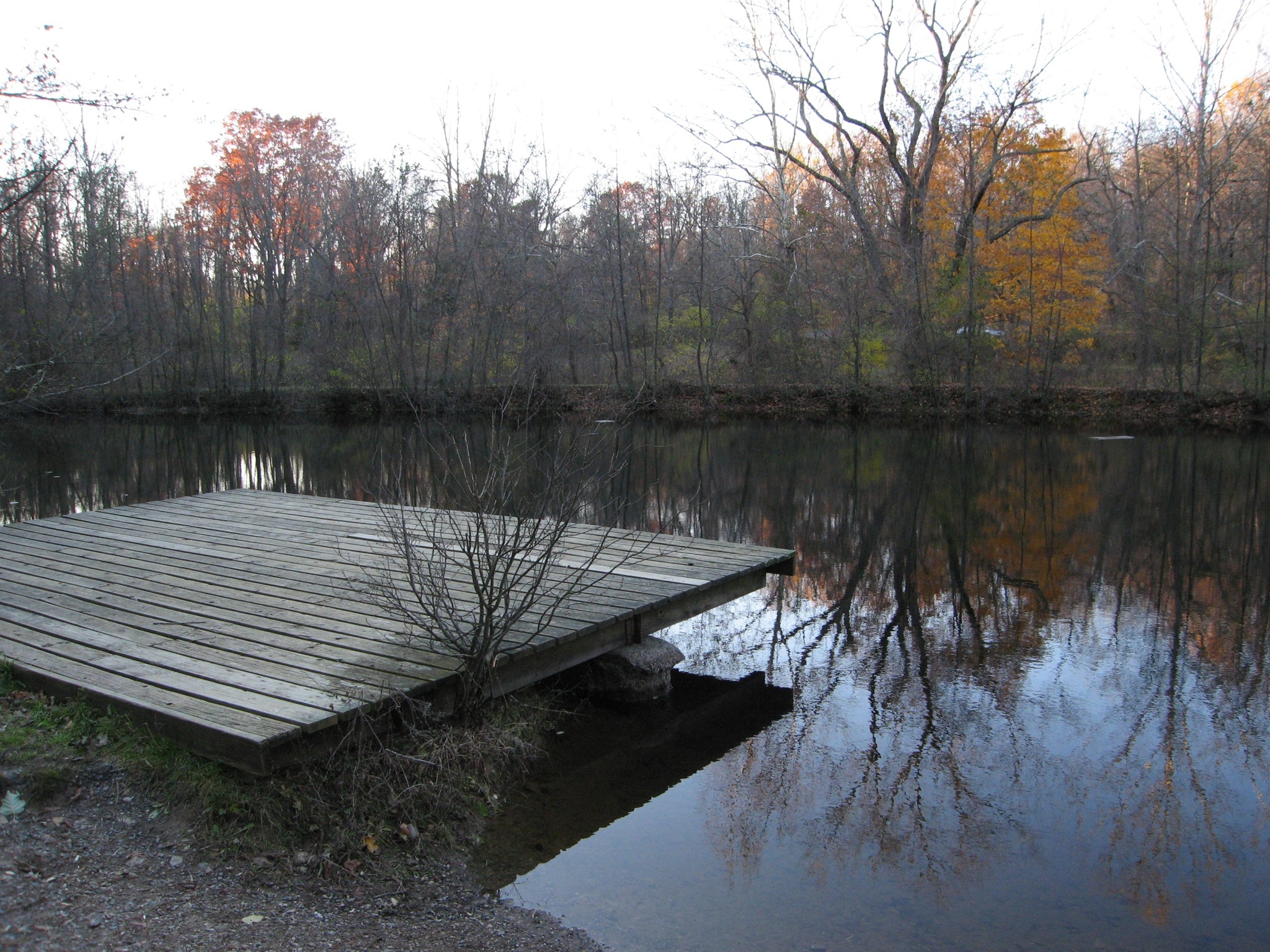
- Nolde Forest Environmental Education Center

- Seal Logo

- Location of Cumru Township in Pennsylvania Cumru Township (the United States)
- Coordinates: 40°18′N 75°57′W
- Country: United States
- State: Pennsylvania
- County: Berks

Area
  - Total: 21.18 sq mi (54.85 km^{2})
  - Land: 20.90 sq mi (54.14 km^{2})
  - Water: 0.28 sq mi (0.72 km^{2})
- Elevation: 459 ft (140 m)

Population (2020)
  - Total: 15,638 ▲
  - Estimate (2021): 15,626
  - Density: 733.6/sq mi (283.25/km^{2})
- Time zone: UTC-5 (EST)
  - Summer (DST): UTC-4 (EDT)
- Area code: 610
- FIPS code: 42-011-17720
- Website: www.cumrutownship.com

Cumru Township (pronounced "KOOM-roo") is a township in Berks County, Pennsylvania, United States. The population was 15,638 at the 2020 census. Nolde Forest Environmental Education Center, a Pennsylvania state park, is in Cumru Township.

== History ==
The township was so named by Welsh settlers, after Cymru, meaning Wales in the Welsh language.

In 1863, Cumru Township was the birthplace of William G. Leininger, creator of the Railroad Sock.

Ridgewood Farm was listed on the National Register of Historic Places in 1992.

== Geography ==
According to the U.S. Census Bureau, the township has a total area of 20.9 square miles (54 km^{2}), of which 20.7 square miles (54 km^{2}) is land and 0.2 square miles (0.52 km^{2}) (1.15%) is water. It is drained by the Schuylkill River, which forms its natural northeastern boundary.

Adjacent townships

- Lower Alsace Township (northeast)
- Exeter Township (northeast)
- Robeson Township (east)
- Brecknock Township (south)
- Spring Township (west)

Adjacent city and boroughs

- Reading (north)
- Wyomissing (north)
- Shillington (north)
- Kenhorst (north)
- Mohnton (surrounded)

Its unincorporated communities include Angelica, Clover Park, Colonial Hills, Farview, Flying Hills, Freemanville, Gouglersville, Grill, Montrose Manor, Pennwyn, Ridge Park, and Ridgewood.

== Demographics ==
Historical population
Census	Pop.	Note	%±
2000	13,816		—
2010	15,147		9.6%
2020	15,638		3.2%
2021 (est.)	15,626		−0.1%
Source: US Census Bureau

At the 2000 census, there were 13,816 people, 5,941 households, and 3,808 families in the township. The population density was 668.0 inhabitants per square mile (257.9/km^{2}). There were 6,127 housing units at an average density of 296.3 per square mile (114.4/km^{2}). The racial makeup of the township was 93.84% White, 1.92% African American, 0.06% Native American, 1.88% Asian, 0.04% Pacific Islander, 1.27% from other races, and 0.99% from two or more races. Hispanic or Latino of any race were 2.82%.

There were 5,941 households, 24.1% had children under the age of 18 living with them, 54.6% were married couples living together, 6.8% had a female householder with no husband present, and 35.9% were non-families. 28.8% of households were made up of individuals, and 12.5% were one person aged 65 or older. The average household size was 2.27 and the average family size was 2.81.

The age distribution was 19.0% under the age of 18, 7.1% from 18 to 24, 26.9% from 25 to 44, 27.4% from 45 to 64, and 19.7% 65 or older. The median age was 43 years. For every 100 females, there were 92.2 males. For every 100 females age 18 and over, there were 89.5 males.

The median household income was $50,103 and the median family income was $58,161. Males had a median income of $42,108 versus $27,701 for females. The per capita income for the township was $28,996. About 1.4% of families and 4.4% of the population were below the poverty line, including 3.1% of those under age 18 and 5.1% of those age 65 or over.

== Recreation ==
The Nolde Forest Environmental Education Center is located near the center of the township, along the west side of Pennsylvania Route 625. Pennsylvania State Game Lands Number 324 is located on an island in the Schuylkill River near Angelica Park.

== Transportation ==
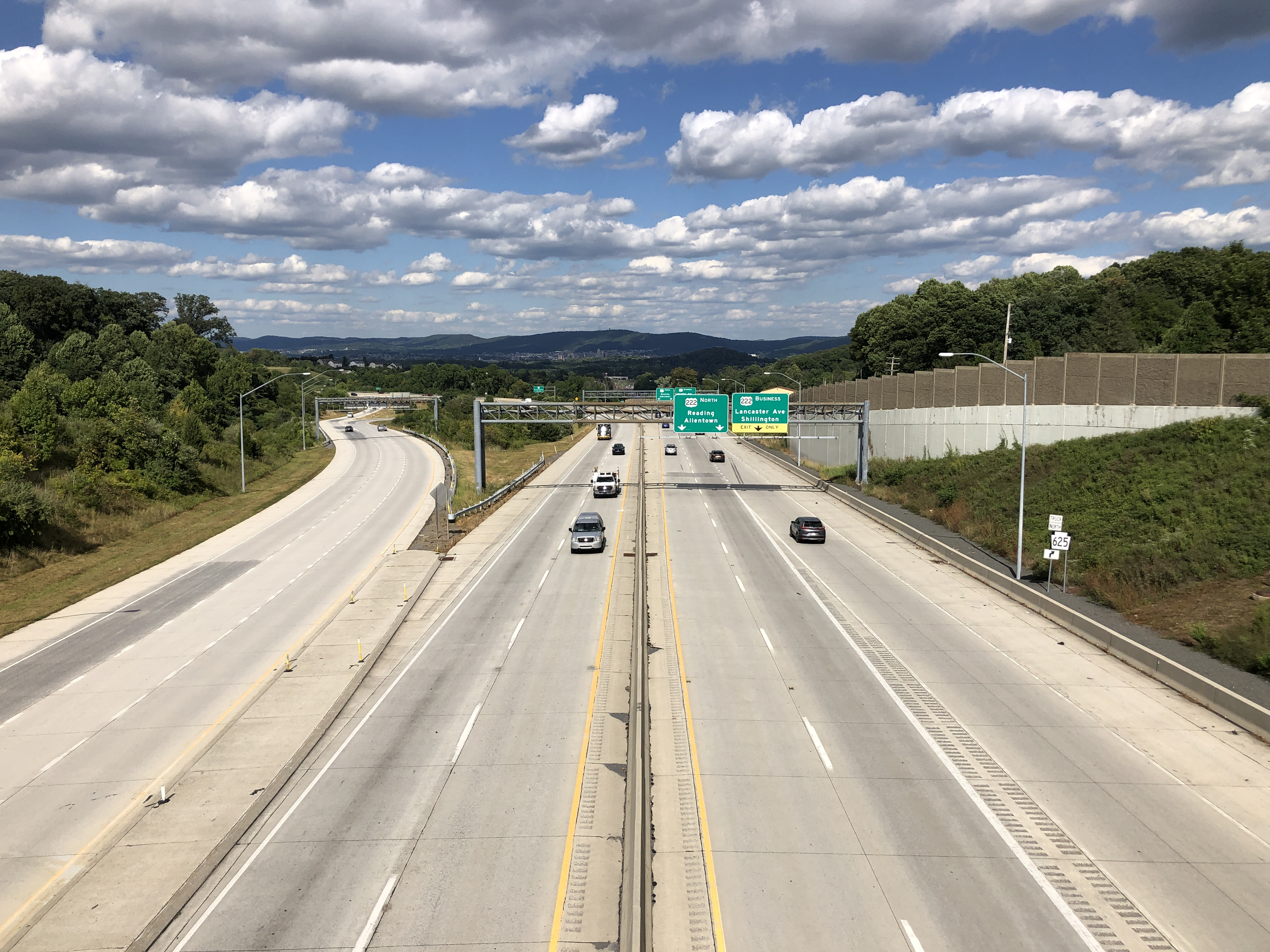
US 222 northbound in Cumru Township

As of 2019, there were 100.62 miles (161.93 km) of public roads in Cumru Township, of which 29.44 miles (47.38 km) were maintained by the Pennsylvania Department of Transportation (PennDOT) and 71.18 miles (114.55 km) were maintained by the township.

Numerous highways serve Cumru Township, including Interstate 176, U.S. Route 222, U.S. Route 222 Business (Lancaster Pike), U.S. Route 422, Pennsylvania Route 10, Pennsylvania Route 625, and Pennsylvania Route 724. I-176 follows the Morgantown Expressway southward from its northern terminus at US 422 across the eastern portion of the township. US 222 follows a north-south alignment along the western edge of the township. US 422 follows the West Shore Bypass along a northwest-southeast alignment across the northern part of the township. US 222 Business begins along US 222 and heads northeastward along Lancaster Avenue across the northwestern part of the township. PA 10 follows Morgantown Road along a north-south alignment across the eastern part of the township. PA 625 follows New Holland Road along a north-south alignment through the center of the township. Finally, PA 724 follows Philadelphia Avenue along an east-west alignment across the northern part of the township.
