= Muhlenberg Park, Pennsylvania =

Unincorporated community in Pennsylvania, US

- Census-designated place
- Location within Pennsylvania Location within the United States
- Coordinates: 40°23′05″N 75°56′29″W
- Country: United States
- State: Pennsylvania
- County: Berks
- Township: Muhlenberg

Area
  - Total: 0.58 sq mi (1.50 km^{2})
  - Land: 0.58 sq mi (1.50 km^{2})
  - Water: 0 sq mi (0.00 km^{2})

Population (2020)
  - Total: 1,544
  - Density: 2,663.5/sq mi (1,028.39/km^{2})
- Time zone: UTC-5 (Eastern (EST))
  - Summer (DST): UTC-4 (EDT)
- ZIP code: 19605
- Area codes: 484 and 610
- FIPS code: 42-52216

Muhlenberg Park is a census-designated place in Muhlenberg Township, Berks County, Pennsylvania, United States. The community is located just to the west of the borough of Laureldale. As of the 2010 census, the population was 1,420 residents. Development of the community began in 1915.

== Demographics ==
Historical population
Census	Pop.	Note	%±
2020	1,544		—
U.S. Decennial Census
