= Fox Chase, Harrisburg =

Coordinates: 40.3339773°N 76.8205273°W

Fox Chase is a neighbourhood of Lower Paxton Township in metropolitan Harrisburg located in Dauphin County, Pennsylvania.
