= Exeter Township School District =

School district in Pennsylvania

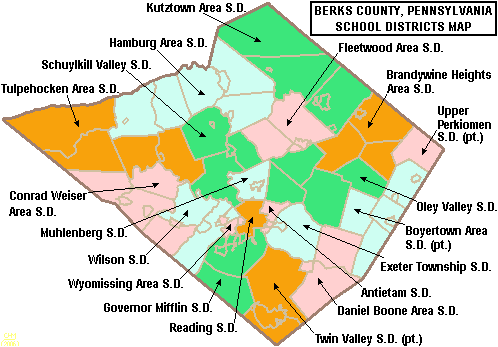

Address
- 200 Elm Street Reading, Pennsylvania, 19606-2798; United States

District information
- Type: Public

Other information
- Website: www.exeter.k12.pa.us

The Exeter Township School District is a small suburban public school district located in Berks County, Pennsylvania. The district serves two municipalities southeast of Reading, the Borough of St. Lawrence, and Exeter Township. In 2009, the District residents’ per capita income was $24,836, while the median family income was $63,670. In the Commonwealth, the median family income was $49,501 and the United States median family income was $49,445, in 2010.

== Schools ==
- Jacksonwald Elementary School (K–4)
- Lorane Elementary School (K–4)
- Owatin Creek Elementary School (K–4)
- Reiffton School (5–6)
- Exeter Township Junior High School (7–8)
- Exeter Township Senior High School (9–12)

== Extracurriculars ==
The district offers a variety of clubs, activities and an extensive sports program.

=== Sports ===
The District funds:

Boys

- Baseball - AAAA
- Basketball- AAAA
- Bowling - AAAA
- Cross Country - AAA
- Football - AAAAA
- Golf - AAA
- Lacrosse - AAAA
- Soccer - AAA
- Swimming and Diving - AAA
- Tennis - AAA
- Track and Field - AAA
- Volleyball - AAA
- Wrestling - AAA
- Water Polo -

Girls

- Basketball - AAAA
- Bowling - AAAA
- Cross Country - AAAA
- Golf - AAA
- Field Hockey - AAAA
- Indoor Track and Field - AAAA
- Lacrosse - AAAA
- Soccer (Fall) - AAA
- Softball - AAAA
- Swimming and Diving - AAA
- Girls' Tennis - AAA
- Track and Field - AAA
- Volleyball - AAA
- Water Polo -

Junior High School Sports

Boys

- Baseball
- Basketball
- Cross Country
- Football
- Indoor Track and Field
- Lacrosse
- Soccer
- Swimming and Diving
- Track and Field
- Wrestling

Girls

- Basketball
- Cross Country
- Field Hockey
- Indoor Track and Field
- Lacrosse
- Soccer
- Softball
- Swimming and Diving
- Track and Field
- Volleyball

According to PIAA directory July 2012
