= Mildred Jordan =

American writer

Mildred Jordan (March 18, 1901 – October 23, 1982) was an American writer and playwright. Born in Chicago, she worked at the Hull House before relocating to Reading, Pennsylvania after her marriage. Her first novel, One Red Rose Forever, which was based on the history of Lancaster County, was rejected by twenty-two publishers before finally appearing in 1941. Her subsequent books often focused on the lives of Pennsylvania Dutch immigrants to America.

A 1954 review of her play The Wonderful Cornelia said she was "one of the nation's best-known novelists", John Updike said her "pen name, Mildred Jordan, masked her true identity as an unmeetably rich industrialist's wife".

In addition to her own writing, Jordan also served as the editor of the Berks County Historical Magazine. She received an honorary doctorate of humane letters from Albright College in 1979.

Jordan was represented by the literary agent Annie Laurie Williams, whose other clients included Margaret Mitchell, John Steinbeck, and Truman Capote.

== Bibliography ==
=== Novels ===
- One Red Rose Forever (1941)
- Apple in the Attic (1942)
- The Shoo-fly Pie (1944)
- I Won't, Said the King (1945)
- Asylum for the Queen (1948)
- Miracle in Brittany (1950)
- Echo of the Flute (1958)

=== Plays ===
- The Wonderful Cornelia (1954)
- Apple in the Attic (1962) (with Lucile Logan)

=== Nonfiction works ===
- Proud to be Amish (1968)
- The Distelfink Country of the Pennsylvania Dutch (1968)

== See also ==
- Thomas Zimmerman
