= Muhlenberg Township, Berks County, Pennsylvania =

Township in Pennsylvania, US

Muhlenberg Township
- Township
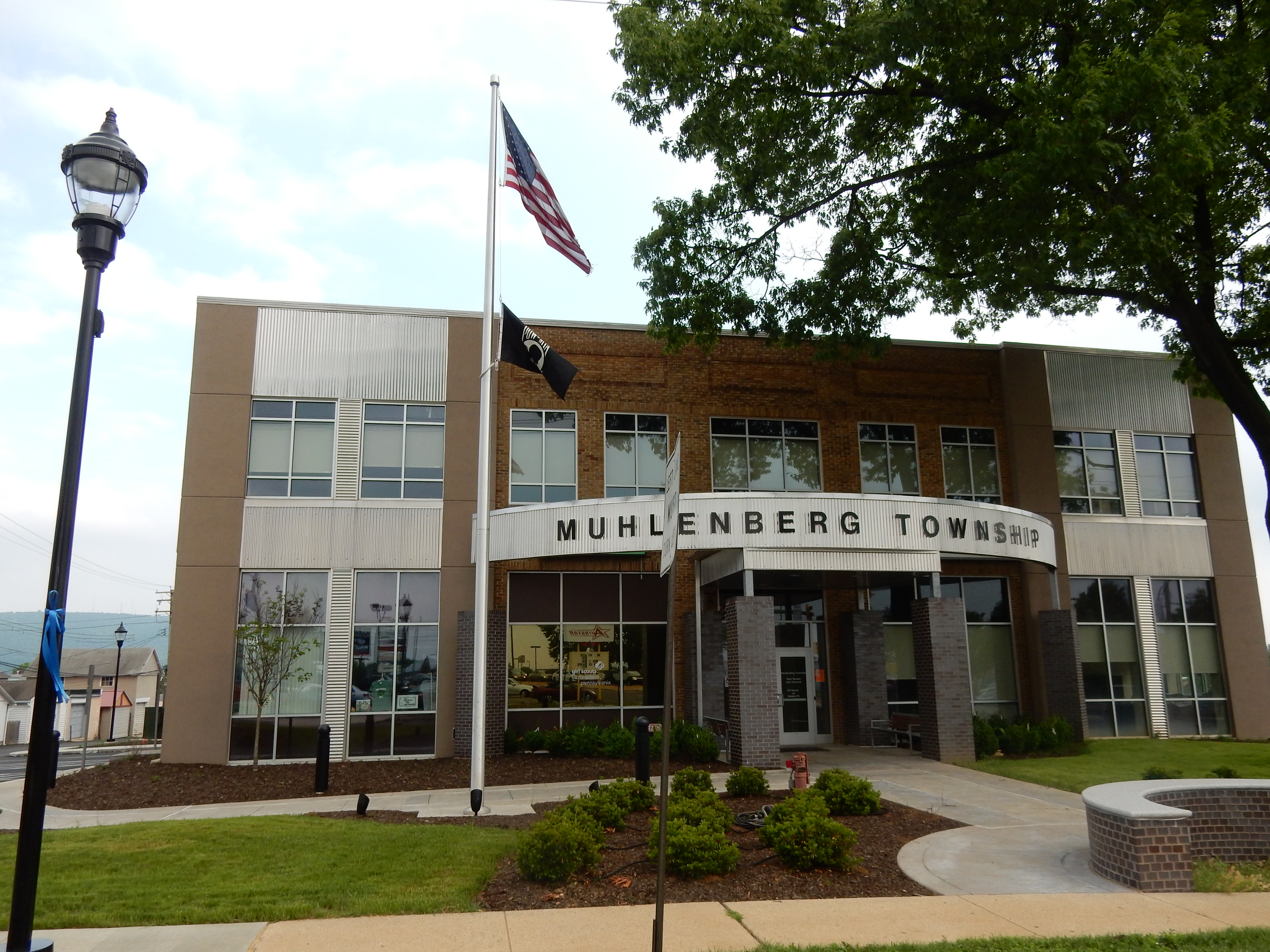
- Muhlenberg Township Municipal Building at 210 George Street, Reading, Pennsylvania

- Seal

- Location of Muhlenberg Township in Pennsylvania Muhlenberg Township (the United States)
- Coordinates: 40°23′33″N 75°55′41″W
- Country: United States
- State: Pennsylvania
- County: Berks

Government
  - Body: Board of Commissioners
  - Board of Commissioners President: Michael Malinowski (R)

Area
  - Total: 12.01 sq mi (31.10 km^{2})
  - Land: 11.78 sq mi (30.52 km^{2})
  - Water: 0.22 sq mi (0.58 km^{2})
- Elevation: 354 ft (108 m)

Population (2020)
  - Total: 21,915
  - Density: 1,859.7/sq mi (718.05/km^{2})
- Time zone: UTC-5 (EST)
  - Summer (DST): UTC-4 (EDT)
- ZIP Code: 19605
- Area codes: 610 and 484
- FIPS code: 42-011-52200
- Website: www.muhlenbergtwp.com

Muhlenberg Township (pronounced "MYOO-len-burg") is a township in Berks County, Pennsylvania, United States. The population was 21,915 at the 2020 census, making it the third-most populous township in Berks County after Spring Township and Exeter Township.

The township was named for U.S. Congressman Henry Augustus Muhlenberg, grandson of Henry Muhlenberg, and who is featured on the township seal.

== Geography ==
According to the U.S. Census Bureau, the township has a total area of 12.2 square miles (31.6 km^{2}), of which 12.0 square miles (31.1 km^{2}) is land and 0.2 square mile (0.5 km^{2}) (1.48%) is water. It is drained by the Schuylkill River, which forms its natural western boundary. Most of the population resides in the western and central areas of the township, while the east is located in the South Mountains.

Adjacent townships

- Bern Township (west)
- Ontelaunee Township (north)
- Maidencreek Township (northeast)
- Ruscombmanor Township (far northeast)
- Alsace Township (east)

Muhlenberg Township surrounds the borough of Laureldale and its southern border is shared entirely with Reading. Within the township are the unincorporated communities or neighborhoods of Bernharts, Cherokee Ranch, College Heights, Frush Valley, Fox Run, Hyde Park, Hyde Villa, Muhlenberg Park, Riverview Park, South Temple, Temple, and Tuckerton.

Muhlenberg contains the retail district of Reading's northern suburbs with a number of restaurants and national retailers along the 5th Street Highway, including the former Fairgrounds Square Mall, former Home of Reading Fairgrounds Speedway. The Greater Reading Expo Center was located in the township just north of the city in proximity to the PA Route 12 expressway.

Muhlenberg has a hot-summer humid continental climate (Dfa) and the hardiness zone is 6b. The average monthly temperature in Muhlenberg Park ranges from 29.7 °F in January to 75.0 °F in July.

== Demographics ==
Historical population
Census	Pop.	Note	%±
1980	13,031		—
1990	12,638		−3.0%
2000	16,305		29.0%
2010	19,628		20.4%
2020	21,915		11.7%
Source: US Census Bureau

As of the census of 2000, there were 16,305 people, 6,639 households, and 4,634 families residing in the township. The population density was 1,357.0 inhabitants per square mile (523.9/km^{2}). There were 6,897 housing units at an average density of 574.0 per square mile (221.6/km^{2}). The racial makeup of the township was 95.48% White, 1.21% African American, 0.04% Native American, 0.71% Asian, 1.66% from other races, and 0.90% from two or more races. Hispanic or Latino of any race were 3.91% of the population.

There were 6,639 households, out of which 26.3% had children under the age of 18 living with them, 57.9% were married couples living together, 7.9% had a female householder with no husband present, and 30.2% were non-families. 25.1% of all households were made up of individuals, and 14.1% had someone living alone who was 65 years of age or older. The average household size was 2.40 and the average family size was 2.86.

In the township, the population was spread out, with 20.3% under the age of 18, 6.0% from 18 to 24, 26.3% from 25 to 44, 24.1% from 45 to 64, and 23.2% who were 65 years of age or older. The median age was 43 years. For every 100 females, there were 91.4 males. For every 100 females age 18 and over, there were 87.6 males.

The median income for a household in the township was $44,627, and the median income for a family was $51,764. Males had a median income of $38,375 versus $26,375 for females. The per capita income for the township was $21,624. About 2.6% of families and 4.2% of the population were below the poverty line, including 4.0% of those under age 18 and 6.1% of those age 65 or over.

== Transportation ==
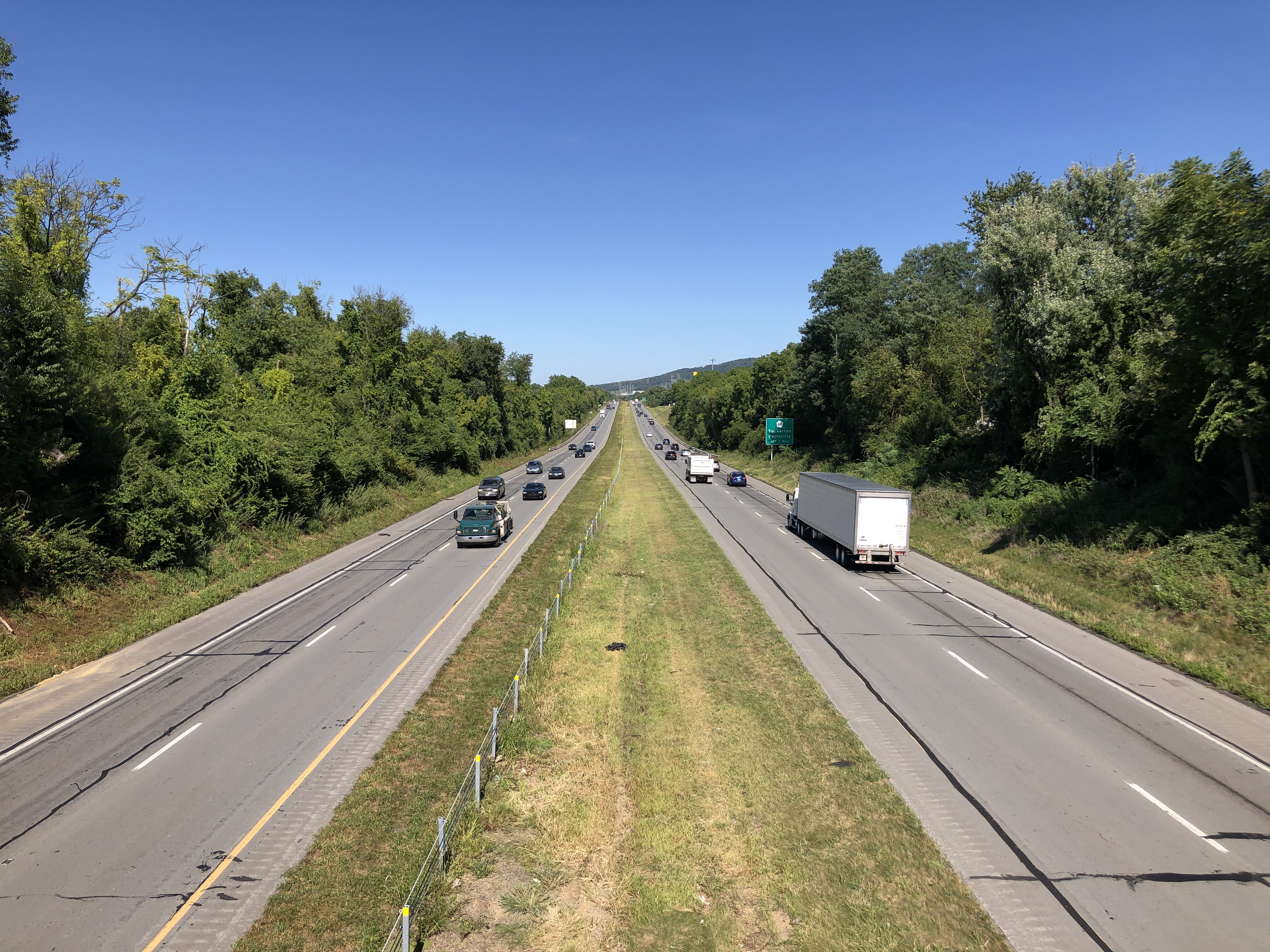
US 222 northbound in Muhlenberg Township

As of 2020, there were 97.28 miles (156.56 km) of public roads in Muhlenberg Township, of which 19.24 miles (30.96 km) were maintained by the Pennsylvania Department of Transportation (PennDOT) and 78.04 miles (125.59 km) were maintained by the township.

U.S. Route 222 is the most prominent highway passing through Muhlenberg Township. It follows a southwest-northeast alignment across the northwestern portion of the township. Other roads passing through the township include Pennsylvania Route 12 (Warren Street Bypass), Pennsylvania Route 61 (Pottsville Pike), and U.S. Route 222 Business (5th Street Highway). PA 61 and US 222 Business are north-to-south thoroughfares that intersect U.S. Route 222 (Outer Bypass) in Tuckerton and Maidencreek Township, north of Temple, respectively. PA 12 connects PA 61 and US 222 Business to US 222 south and U.S. Route 422 and, to the northeast, PA 12 becomes Pricetown Road. Other important local roads include Bellevue Avenue, Elizabeth Avenue, Hartman Road/Leisczs Bridge Road, Kutztown Road, River Road, Spring Valley Road, Stouts Ferry Bridge Road, and Tuckerton Road.

Muhlenberg Township is served by multiple Berks Area Regional Transportation Authority (BARTA) bus routes including 1, 2, 3, 20, and 22, which serve residential and business areas in the township and connect the township to the BARTA Transportation Center in Reading and other points in Berks County.
