= Colony Park, Pennsylvania =

Unincorporated community in Pennsylvania, US

- Census-designated place
- Location within Pennsylvania Location within the United States
- Coordinates: 40°20′49″N 75°58′57″W
- Country: United States
- State: Pennsylvania
- County: Berks
- Township: Spring

Area
  - Total: 0.37 sq mi (0.97 km^{2})
  - Land: 0.37 sq mi (0.97 km^{2})
  - Water: 0 sq mi (0.00 km^{2})
- Elevation: 344 ft (105 m)

Population (2020)
  - Total: 1,269
  - Density: 3,372.5/sq mi (1,302.14/km^{2})
- Time zone: UTC-5 (Eastern (EST))
  - Summer (DST): UTC-4 (EDT)
- ZIP code: 19610
- Area codes: 484, 610 and 835
- FIPS code: 42-15368
- GNIS feature ID: 2633342

Colony Park is a census-designated place in Spring Township, Berks County, Pennsylvania, United States. It is located just off U.S. 222, approximately one mile northwest of the borough of Wyomissing. As of the 2020 census, the population was 1,269 residents.

Historical population
Census	Pop.	Note	%±
2020	1,269		—
U.S. Decennial Census
