= West Wyomissing, Pennsylvania =

Unincorporated community in Pennsylvania, US

- Census-designated place
- Location of West Wyomissing in Pennsylvania and the United States West Wyomissing (the United States)
- Coordinates: 40°19′22″N 75°59′40″W
- Country: United States
- State: Pennsylvania
- County: Berks
- Township: Spring

Area
  - Total: 0.7 sq mi (1.8 km^{2})
  - Land: 0.7 sq mi (1.8 km^{2})
  - Water: 0.0 sq mi (0 km^{2})
- Elevation: 361 ft (110 m)

Population (2010)
  - Total: 3,407
  - Density: 4,900/sq mi (1,900/km^{2})
- Time zone: UTC-5 (EST)
  - Summer (DST): UTC-4 (EDT)
- Area code: 610

West Wyomissing is a census-designated place (CDP) in Spring Township, Berks County, Pennsylvania, United States. The population was 3,407 at the 2010 census.

== Geography ==
West Wyomissing is located at 40°19′22″N 75°59′40″W (40.322771, -75.994583). According to the U.S. Census Bureau, West Wyomissing has a total area of 0.7 square miles (1.8 km^{2}), all land.

== Demographics ==
=== 2020 census ===
As of the 2020 census, West Wyomissing had a population of 3,630. The median age was 40.1 years. 21.7% of residents were under the age of 18 and 19.5% of residents were 65 years of age or older. For every 100 females there were 89.8 males, and for every 100 females age 18 and over there were 88.8 males age 18 and over.

100.0% of residents lived in urban areas, while 0.0% lived in rural areas.

There were 1,483 households in West Wyomissing, of which 29.0% had children under the age of 18 living in them. Of all households, 45.2% were married-couple households, 17.4% were households with a male householder and no spouse or partner present, and 27.8% were households with a female householder and no spouse or partner present. About 28.7% of all households were made up of individuals and 13.2% had someone living alone who was 65 years of age or older.

There were 1,532 housing units, of which 3.2% were vacant. The homeowner vacancy rate was 1.1% and the rental vacancy rate was 4.2%.

Racial composition as of the 2020 census
Race	Number	Percent
White	2,763	76.1%
Black or African American	188	5.2%
American Indian and Alaska Native	5	0.1%
Asian	46	1.3%
Native Hawaiian and Other Pacific Islander	0	0.0%
Some other race	268	7.4%
Two or more races	360	9.9%
Hispanic or Latino (of any race)	721	19.9%

=== 2000 census ===
As of the 2000 census, there were 3,016 people, 1,363 households, and 894 families living in the CDP. The population density was 4,565.0 inhabitants per square mile (1,762.6/km^{2}). There were 1,411 housing units at an average density of 2,135.7 per square mile (824.6/km^{2}). The racial makeup of the CDP was 95.46% White, 1.26% African American, 0.07% Native American, 0.53% Asian, 0.03% Pacific Islander, 1.19% from other races, and 1.46% from two or more races. Hispanic or Latino of any race were 3.08% of the population.

There were 1,363 households, out of which 23.3% had children under the age of 18 living with them, 53.0% were married couples living together, 9.1% had a female householder with no husband present, and 34.4% were non-families. 29.4% of all households were made up of individuals, and 15.6% had someone living alone who was 65 years of age or older. The average household size was 2.21 and the average family size was 2.70.

The age distribution was 18.3% under the age of 18, 6.2% from 18 to 24, 27.8% from 25 to 44, 23.8% from 45 to 64, and 23.9% who were 65 years of age or older. The median age was 43 years. For every 100 females, there were 95.2 males. For every 100 females age 18 and over, there were 89.2 males.

The median income for a household in the CDP was $43,553, and the median income for a family was $51,429. Males had a median income of $37,791 versus $26,422 for females. The per capita income for the CDP was $20,969. About 1.4% of families and 3.1% of the population were below the poverty line, including 8.3% of those under age 18 and 2.9% of those age 65 or over.
