= Mohnton, Pennsylvania =

Borough in Pennsylvania, US

- Borough
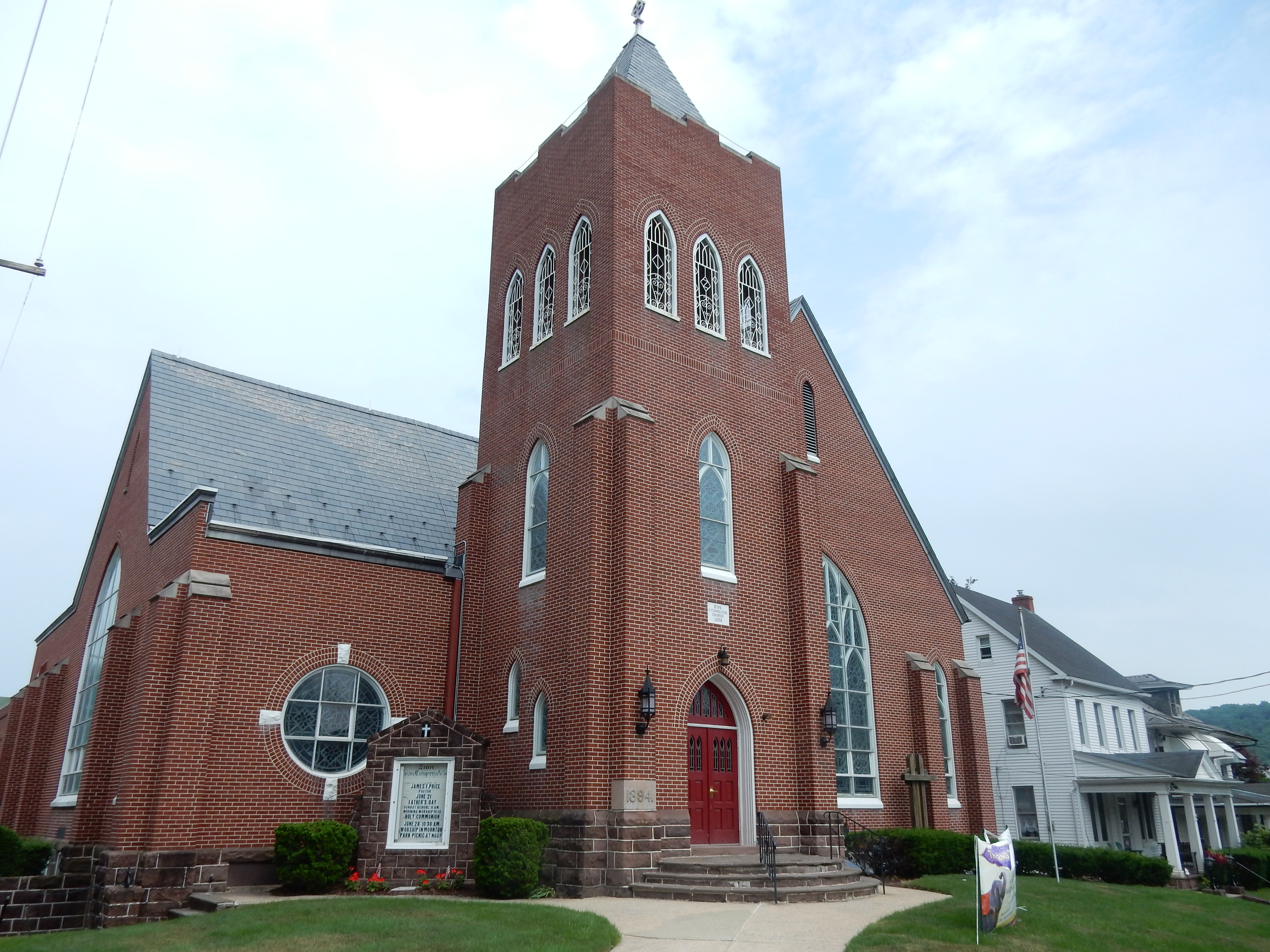
- Zion Evangelical Church (1894).

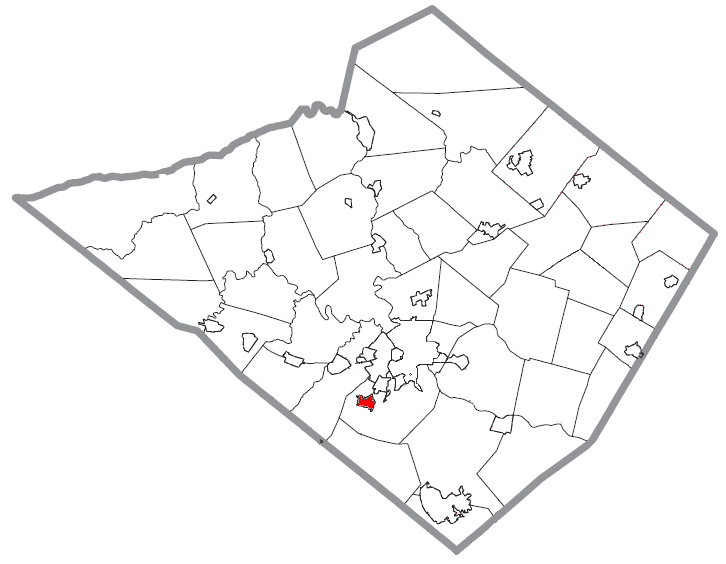
- Location of Mohnton in Berks County, Pennsylvania.

- Location of Mohnton in Pennsylvania Mohnton (the United States)
- Coordinates: 40°17′10″N 75°59′09″W
- Country: United States
- State: Pennsylvania
- County: Berks

Area
  - Total: 0.77 sq mi (1.99 km^{2})
  - Land: 0.76 sq mi (1.98 km^{2})
  - Water: 0.0039 sq mi (0.01 km^{2})
- Elevation: 489 ft (149 m)

Population (2020)
  - Total: 2,927
  - Density: 3,831.9/sq mi (1,479.49/km^{2})
- Time zone: UTC-5 (EST)
  - Summer (DST): UTC-4 (EDT)
- ZIP Code: 19540
- Area codes: 610 and 484
- FIPS code: 42-50272
- Website: mohntonboro.org

Mohnton is a borough in Berks County, Pennsylvania, United States. It had a population of 2,927 in the 2020 census. It was first settled by Benjamin Mohn in 1846 and later it was officially incorporated as a borough in 1907.

== History ==
The town centered around several industries such as milling, gun-smithing and hat-making. The first of these to appear was a grist mill built by Mohn the same year he arrived in 1846. Within this mill, Benjamin Mohn's nephew, Samuel K. Mohn opened a general store for citizens of the countryside. With the success of the general store the Mohns decided to concentrate on merchandising and in 1857 build a new three-story store and petitioned to establish a post office nearby. This earliest post office in Mohnton was called Mohn's Store and was established at Mohn's Store in 1857, the post office was renamed Mohnton in 1906, and it remains in operation.

== Geography ==
Mohnton is located in southern Berks County at 40°17′10″N 75°59′9″W (40.286242, -75.985936), part of the contiguous urban area surrounding the city of Reading. It is bordered on all sides by Cumru Township, including the unincorporated community of Pennwyn on the borough's eastern border. The borough of Shillington is 1 mile (1.6 km) to the northeast. Wyomissing Creek flows through the center of Mohnton.

According to the United States Census Bureau, Mohnton has a total area of 0.77 square miles (2.0 km^{2}), of which 0.004 square miles (0.01 km^{2}), or 0.63%, is water.

== Demographics ==
Historical population
Census	Pop.	Note	%±
1910	1,536		—
1920	1,640		6.8%
1930	1,824		11.2%
1940	1,853		1.6%
1950	2,004		8.1%
1960	2,223		10.9%
1970	2,153		−3.1%
1980	2,156		0.1%
1990	2,484		15.2%
2000	2,963		19.3%
2010	3,043		2.7%
2020	2,927		−3.8%

As of the census of 2000, there were 2,963 people, 1,211 households, and 842 families living in the borough. The population density was 3,396.0 inhabitants per square mile (1,311.2/km^{2}). There were 1,259 housing units at an average density of 1,443.0 per square mile (557.1/km^{2}). The racial makeup of the borough was 96.79% White, 1.11% African American, 0.07% Native American, 0.44% Asian, 0.88% from other races, and 0.71% from two or more races. Hispanic or Latino of any race were 1.69% of the population.

There were 1,211 households, out of which 35.2% had children under the age of 18 living with them, 54.8% were married couples living together, 11.9% had a female householder with no husband present, and 30.4% were non-families. 26.3% of all households were made up of individuals, and 8.8% had someone living alone who was 65 years of age or older. The average household size was 2.44 and the average family size was 2.95.

In the borough the population was spread out, with 25.6% under the age of 18, 6.5% from 18 to 24, 32.5% from 25 to 44, 22.5% from 45 to 64, and 12.9% who were 65 years of age or older. The median age was 37 years. For every 100 females there were 89.8 males. For every 100 females age 18 and over, there were 83.7 males.

The median income for a household in the borough was $41,429, and the median income for a family was $56,174. Males had a median income of $40,037 versus $25,266 for females. The per capita income for the borough was $21,268. About 3.2% of families and 4.9% of the population were below the poverty line, including 6.8% of those under age 18 and 3.2% of those age 65 or over.

== Sports ==
Maple Grove Raceway located 8 miles (13 km) south of Mohnton in Brecknock Township, hosts the NHRA Mello Yello Drag Racing Series' Keystone Nationals.

== Notable people ==
- Innerpartysystem - electronic rock band
- Matt Swarmer (born 1993), MLB pitcher
- John N. Wenrich (1917–2011), American artist

== Transportation ==
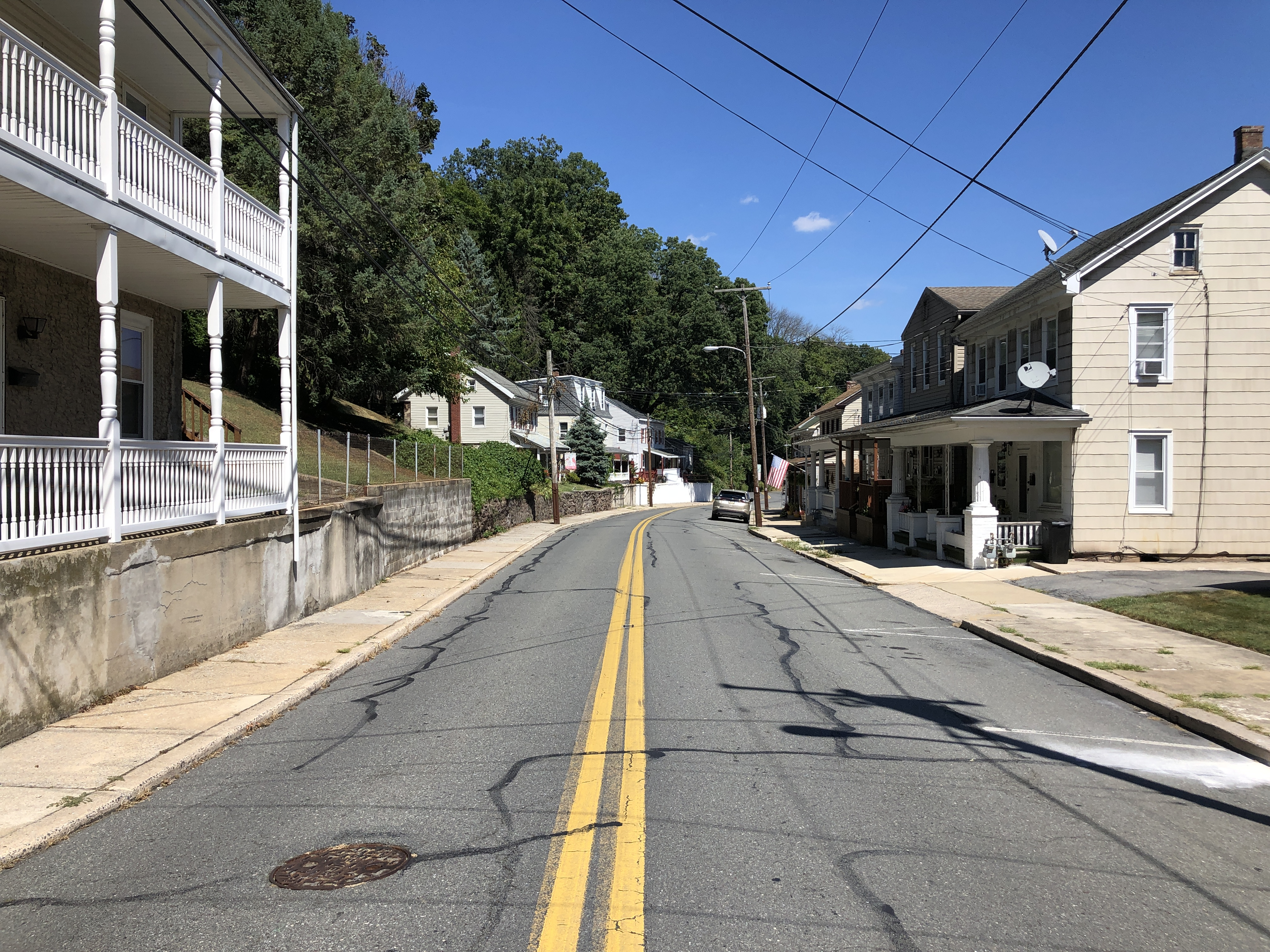
Wyomissing Avenue in Mohnton

As of 2007, there were 13.36 miles (21.50 km) of public roads in Mohnton, of which 2.19 miles (3.52 km) were maintained by the Pennsylvania Department of Transportation (PennDOT) and 11.17 miles (17.98 km) were maintained by the borough.

No numbered highways pass through Mohnton. The main thoroughfares through the borough include Wyomissing Avenue and Church Street, which intersect near the center of town.
