= Pennsylvania House of Representatives, District 5 =

American legislative district

Pennsylvania's 5th State House of Representatives district
Representative
Eric Weaknecht; R–Bern Township
- Population (2022): 65,035

The 5th Pennsylvania House of Representatives District is located in southeastern Pennsylvania and has been represented by Eric Weaknecht since 2025.

== District profile ==
Located in Berks County, the 5th Pennsylvania House of Representatives District includes the following areas:

- Bern Township
- Bernville
- Bethel Township
- Centre Township
- Centerport
- Heidelberg Township
- Jefferson Township
- Leesport
- Lower Heidelberg Township
- Marion Township
- North Heidelberg Township
- Ontelaunee Township
- Penn Township
- Perry Township
- Robesonia
- Shoemakersville
- South Heidelberg Township
- Spring Township (part)
  - District 05
  - District 07
  - District 08
- Tulpehocken Township
- Wernersville
- Womelsdorf

== Representatives ==
Representative	Party	Years	District home	Note
Prior to 1969, seats were apportioned by county.
David S. Hayes	Republican	1969 – 1980	Fairview Borough	
James R. Merry	Republican	1981 – 1996	Linesville, Borough	
R. Tracy Seyfert	Republican	1997 – 2000	Fairview Township	
John R. Evans	Republican	2001 – 2012	Sadsbury Township	
Greg Lucas	Republican	2013 – 2014	Edinboro Borough	
Barry Jozwiak	Republican	2014 – 2024	Bern Township	
Eric Weaknecht	Republican	2025 – present	Bern Township	

== Recent election results ==
PA House election, 2024: Pennsylvania House, District 5
Party	Candidate	Votes	%
Republican	Eric Weaknecht	23,561	66.78
Democratic	Heather Hanna	11,720	33.22
Total votes		35,281	100.00
Republican hold			

PA House election, 2022: Pennsylvania House, District 5
Party	Candidate	Votes	%
Republican	Barry Jozwiak (incumbent)	Unopposed	
Total votes		21,349	100.00
Republican hold			

PA House election, 2020: Pennsylvania House, District 5
Party	Candidate	Votes	%
Republican	Barry Jozwiak (incumbent)	23,291	69.73
Democratic	Graham Gonzales	10,112	30.27
Total votes		33,403	100.00
Republican hold			

PA House election, 2018: Pennsylvania House, District 5
Party	Candidate	Votes	%
Republican	Barry Jozwiak (incumbent)	Unopposed	
Total votes		18,082	100.00
Republican hold			

PA House election, 2016: Pennsylvania House, District 5
Party	Candidate	Votes	%
Republican	Barry Jozwiak (incumbent)	Unopposed	
Total votes		23,936	100.00
Republican hold			
