= Dauberville, Pennsylvania =

Unincorporated community in Pennsylvania, US

- Census-designated place
- Location within Pennsylvania Location within the United States
- Coordinates: 40°23′01″N 75°43′58″W
- Country: United States
- State: Pennsylvania
- County: Berks
- Township: Centre

Area
  - Total: 2.12 sq mi (5.49 km^{2})
  - Land: 2.10 sq mi (5.44 km^{2})
  - Water: 0.015 sq mi (0.04 km^{2})

Population (2020)
  - Total: 762
  - Density: 362.6/sq mi (140.01/km^{2})
- Time zone: UTC-5 (Eastern (EST))
  - Summer (DST): UTC-4 (EDT)
- FIPS code: 42-18256

Dauberville is a census-designated place in Centre Township, Berks County, Pennsylvania, United States. It is located near the Schuylkill River near the Ontelaunee Township border. Students living in the town attend the Schuylkill Valley School District.

The community is located within the Reading, PA Metropolitan Statistical Area and the Philadelphia metropolitan area. As of the 2020 census, the population was 762 residents.

Historical population
Census	Pop.	Note	%±
2020	762		—
U.S. Decennial Census

== See also ==
- Dauberville Bridge, a historic concrete arch bridge spanning the Schuylkill River
