= Steve Kreider =

American football player (born 1958)

No. 86
- Position: Wide receiver

Personal information
- Born: May 12, 1958 (age 68); Reading, Pennsylvania, U.S.
- Listed height: 6 ft 3 in (1.91 m)
- Listed weight: 192 lb (87 kg)

Career information
- High school: Schuylkill Valley (Leesport, Pennsylvania)
- College: Lehigh (1975–1978)
- NFL draft: 1979: 6th round, 139th overall pick

Career history
- Cincinnati Bengals (1979–1986)

Career NFL statistics
- Receptions: 150
- Receiving yards: 2,119
- Receiving touchdowns: 9
- Stats at Pro Football Reference

Steve Kreider (born May 12, 1958) is an American football quarterback and a wide receiver who played eight seasons in the National Football League (NFL) for the Cincinnati Bengals.

== Early life ==
Born in Reading, Pennsylvania on May 12, 1958, Kreider attended Schuylkill Valley High School in Leesport, Pennsylvania, and played high school football for the Schuylkill Valley Panthers. After high school, he attended Lehigh University.

In 1977, Kreider was named a Division II All-American, catching 53 passes for 1,181 yards and 12 touchdowns. He went on to catch another 9 passes for 171 yards and four touchdowns in a postseason match against the University of Massachusetts, as Lehigh went on to win the Division II National Championship. He finished his college career with 118 reception for 2,159 yards and 24 touchdowns and was entered into Lehigh's athletic hall of fame in 1995.

== Career ==
Kreider was a sixth-round draft pick by the Cincinnati Bengals in 1979, and was a member of the 1981 AFC championship team, receiving 37 passes and gaining a total of 520 yards and five touchdowns for the season. It was the Bengals' first Super Bowl appearance; however, the team lost Super Bowl XVI to Joe Montana and the San Francisco 49ers, 26–21. Kreider was released from the Bengals after the 1988 season.

During his time in the NFL, he earned a PhD in finance from the University of Cincinnati.

== NFL career statistics ==
Legend
**Bold**	Career high

=== Regular season ===
Year	Team	Games		Receiving				
Year	Team	GP	GS	Rec	Yds	Avg	Lng	TD
1979	CIN	15	0	3	20	6.7	8	0
1980	CIN	**16**	0	17	272	16.0	30	0
1981	CIN	**16**	1	37	520	14.1	46	**5**
1982	CIN	9	0	16	230	14.4	28	1
1983	CIN	**16**	2	**42**	**554**	13.2	54	1
1984	CIN	**16**	**3**	20	243	12.2	27	1
1985	CIN	**16**	0	10	184	18.4	**56**	1
1986	CIN	10	0	5	96	**19.2**	23	0
		114	6	150	2,119	14.1	56	9

=== Playoffs ===
Year	Team	Games		Receiving				
Year	Team	GP	GS	Rec	Yds	Avg	Lng	TD
1981	CIN	**3**	0	**3**	**78**	**26.0**	**42**	0
1982	CIN	1	0	**3**	41	13.7	12	0
		4	0	6	119	19.8	42	0
