= Belleman's Union Church =

Historic church in Pennsylvania, United States

- Bellman's Union Church
- U.S. National Register of Historic Places
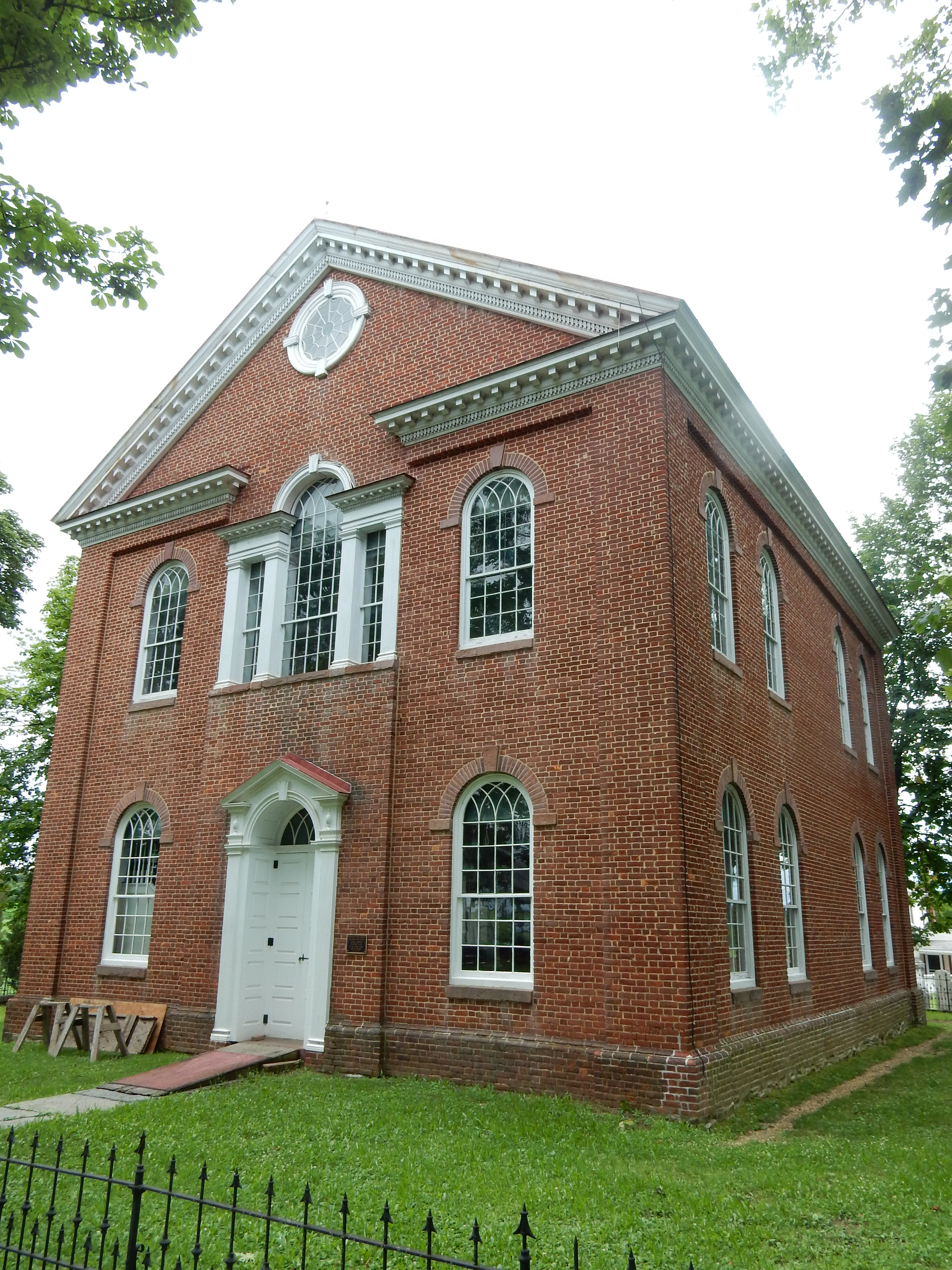
- Old Belleman's Union Church, east side.

- Location within Pennsylvania Location within the United States
- Nearest city: Centerport, Pennsylvania
- Coordinates: 40°27′31″N 76°1′52″W
- Area: 2.5 acres (1.0 ha)
- Built: 1814
- Architectural style: Georgian
- NRHP reference No.: 73001589
- Added to NRHP: December 04, 1973

Bellman's Union Church is a historic church in Mohrsville, Pennsylvania.

The two church congregations - Lutheran and United Church of Christ - date back to 1746. The log cabin they shared and used for separate services no longer stands, but an outline of the foundation is still found on premises.

The second church built on the site, the Old Belleman's church, was built in 1814 and added to the National Register of Historic Places in 1973. While it has not been updated for electricity and plumbing, the Georgian-style church features many styles and motifs not seen in many 19th century rural churches. The church embellishes many of the fine points of architecture such as an elaborate cornice, Palladian windows, arched windows, detailed doorways and a gallery. Particular focal points are the wineglass pulpit and a hand-pump organ. The building is used several times per year during warmer months, for Sunday services, weddings, and annual "Hymn Sings" and a service in the Pennsylvania German dialect.

The third church was constructed in 1924. Beginning in 2003, the two congregations have shared a pastor and hold shared services, as well as a shared choir, committees, and youth groups, but still maintain their separate identities.

The church is home to the Boy Scouts of America Troop 154 of Dauberville, Pa.

== Gallery ==
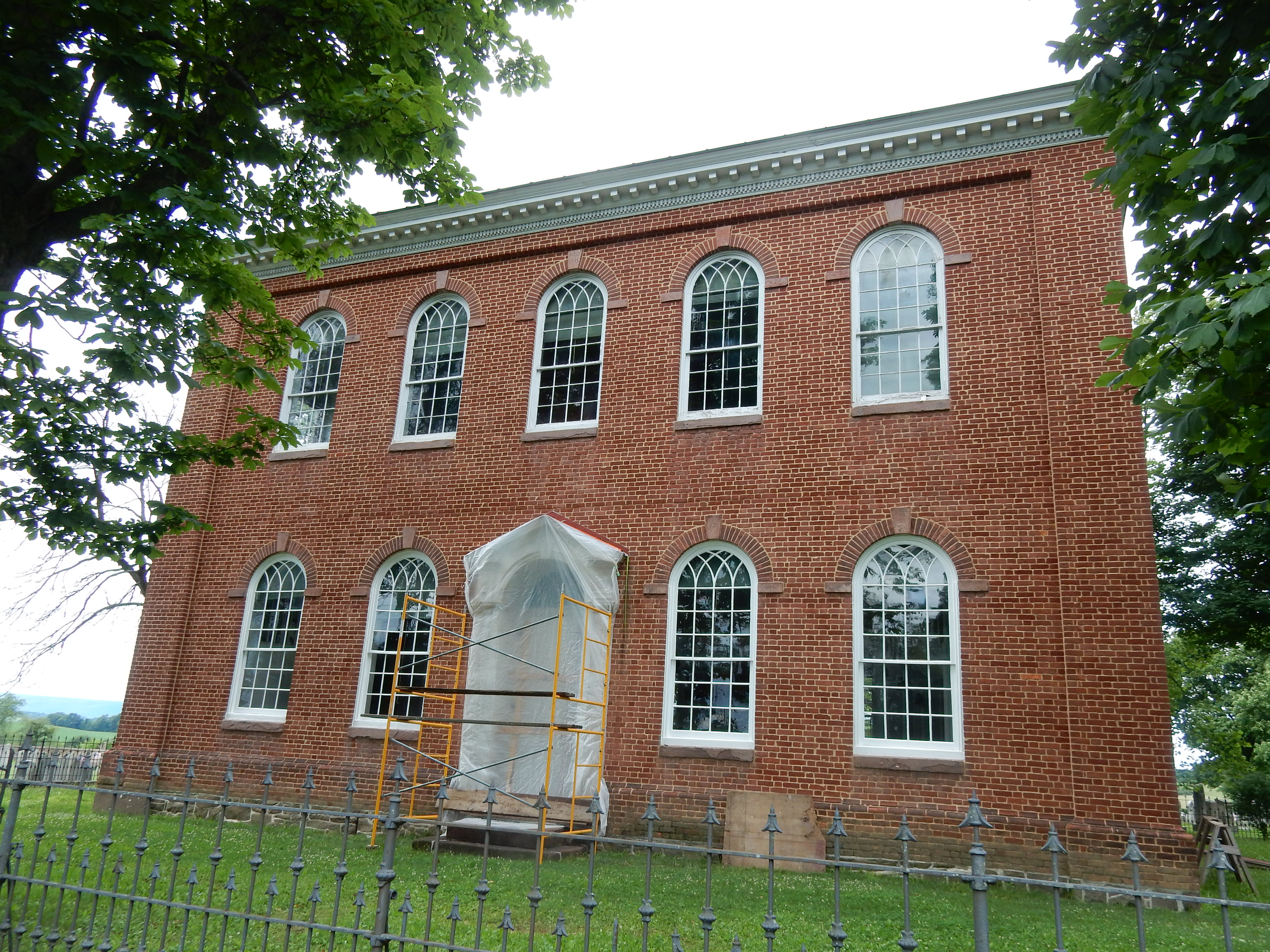
Front side.

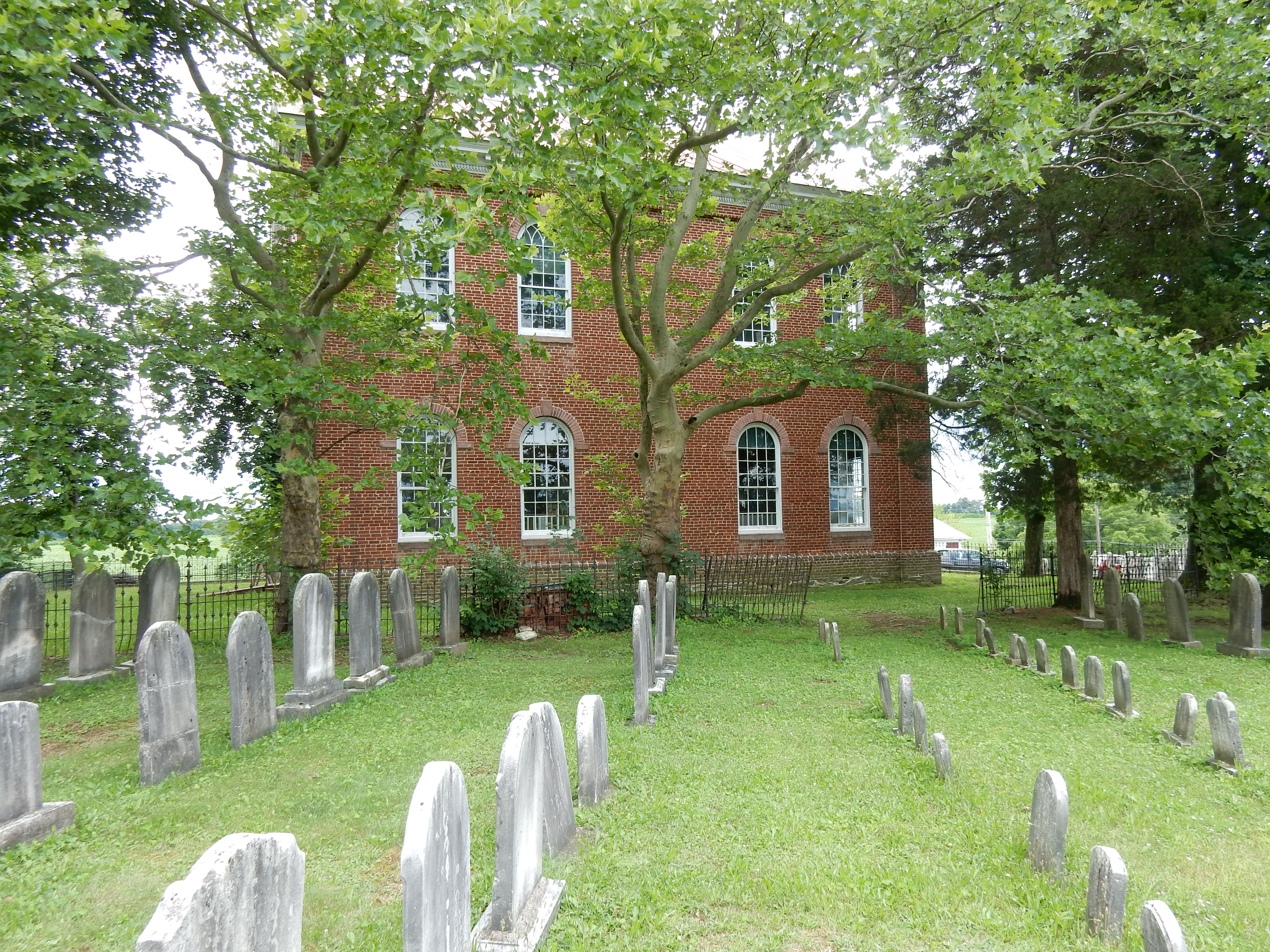
Back side and cemetery.

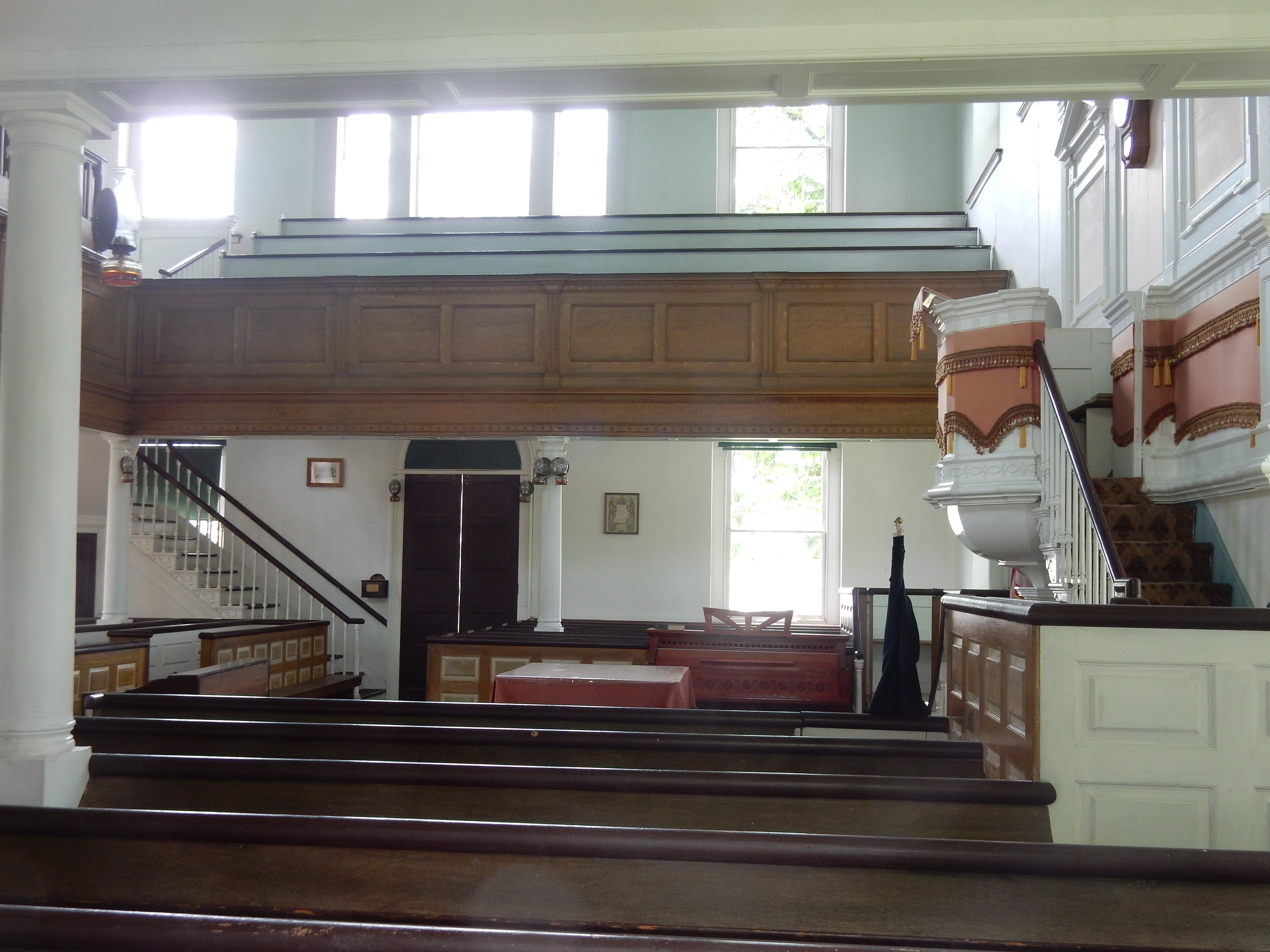
Old Church interior.

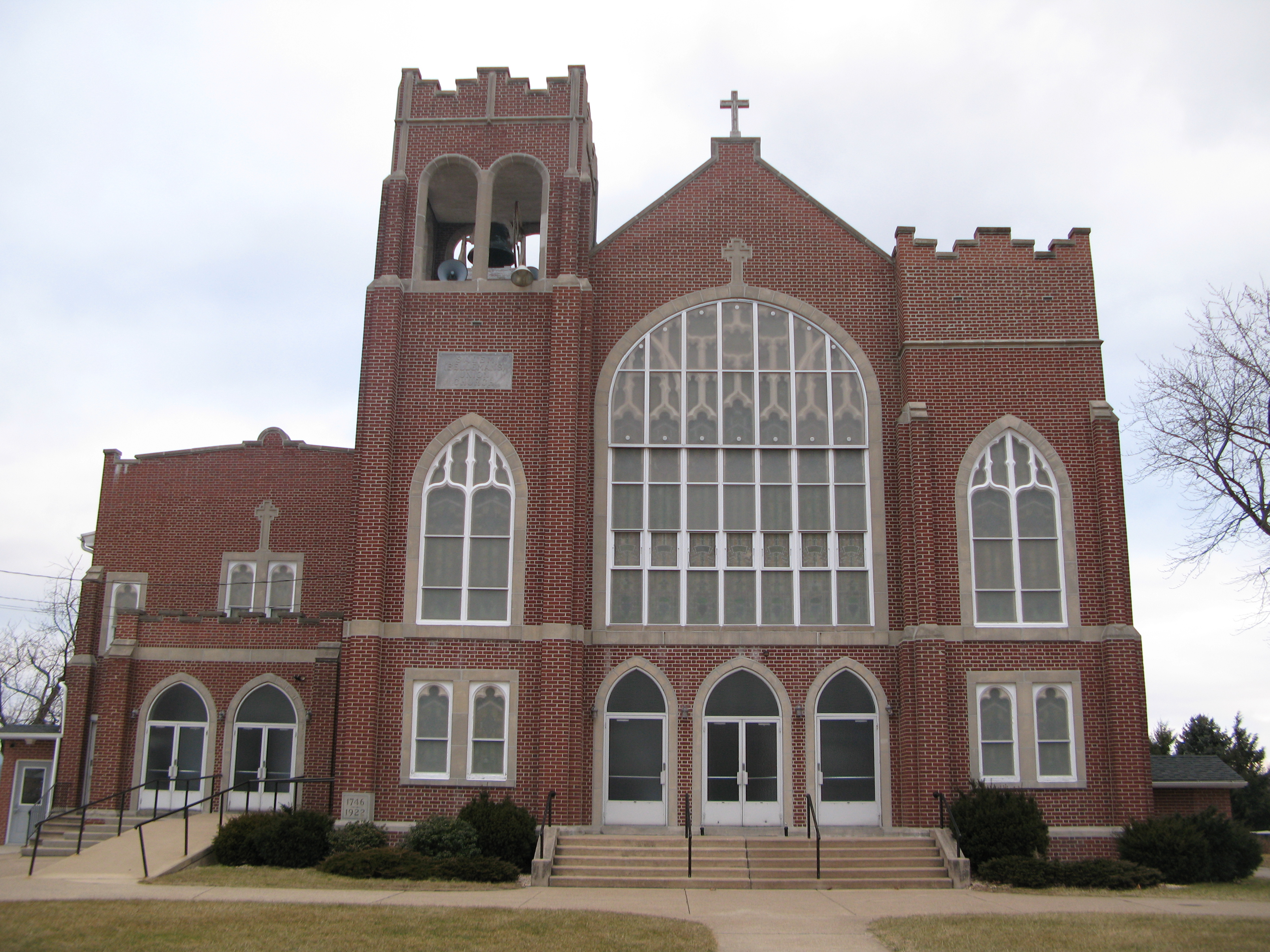
Current church, built in 1924.

== See also ==
- Rebersburg Historic District
