= Berkley Historic District =

Historic district in Pennsylvania, United States

- U.S. National Register of Historic Places
- U.S. Historic district
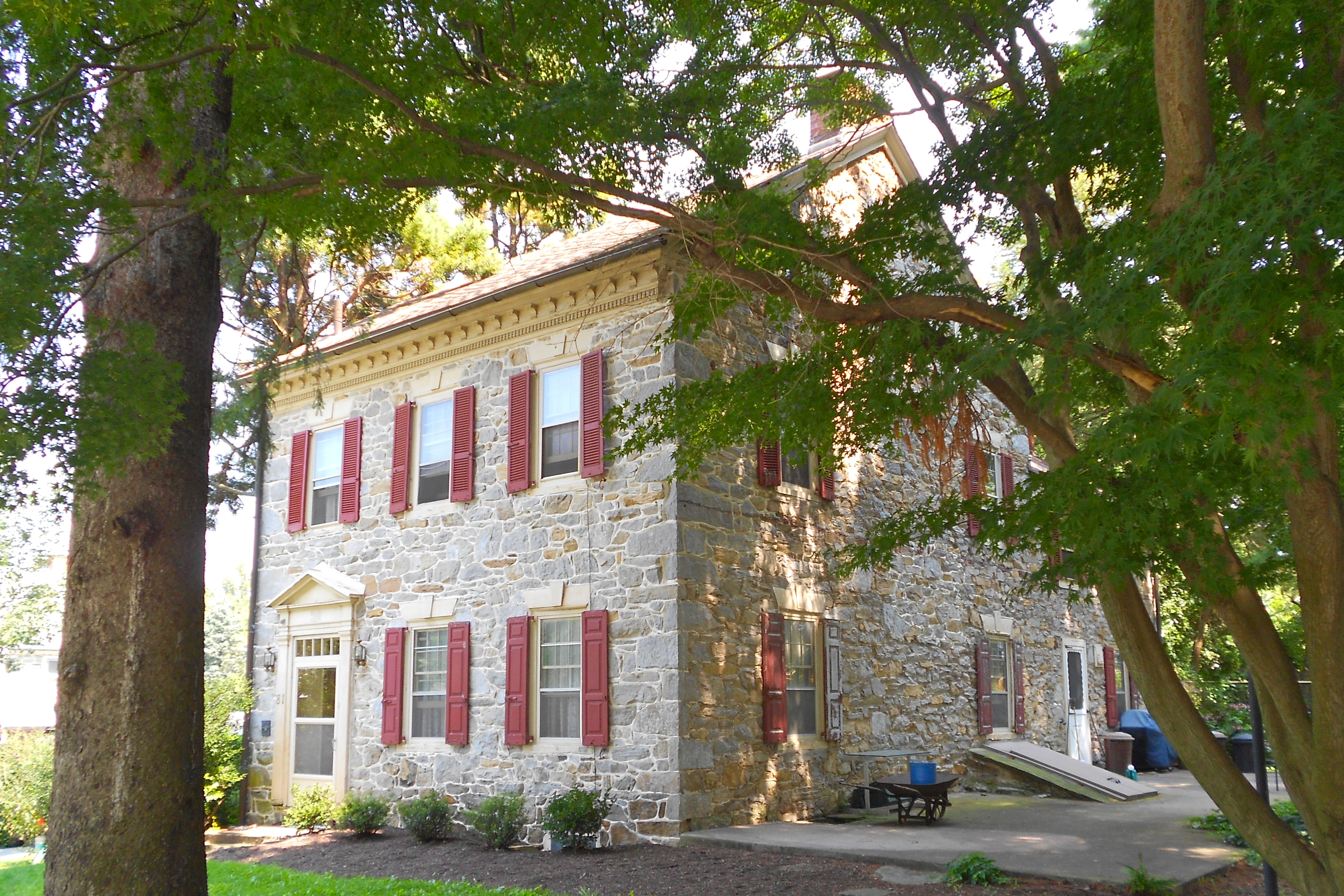
- House at 81 Berkley Road in Berkley Historic District

- Location within Pennsylvania Location within the United States
- Location: Section of Snyder Rd. bet PA 61 and Berkley Rd., Ontelaunee Township, Pennsylvania
- Coordinates: 40°25′39″N 75°56′16″W
- Area: 5 acres (2.0 ha)
- Architectural style: Georgian, Federal
- NRHP reference No.: 02000892
- Added to NRHP: August 22, 2002

Berkley Historic District is a national historic district located in Ontelaunee Township, Berks County, Pennsylvania. The district encompasses 14 contributing buildings on 4 contributing properties in the hamlet of Berkley built between 1758 and 1856. They are the Francis Parvin Homestead, separately listed Davies House (c. 1770), Georgian style Roberta and Richard Schmehl House (c. 1754, 1830), and Dunkle House (c. 1830). The Parvin homestead includes the Parvin House. It was built in 1758 and expanded in 1856. It is a 2 1/2-story, five-bay, side-gabled dwelling with a front porch added about 1880. Also on the homestead is a barn built about 1800. The Parvin family was active in the local Quaker community and the property may have been a station on the Underground Railroad.

It was listed on the National Register of Historic Places in 2002.
