= James Merry =

James Merry may refer to:

- James R. Merry (1927–2001), Republican member of the Pennsylvania House of Representatives
- James Merry (Scottish politician) (1805–1877), MP for Falkirk Burghs 1859–1874
