= Eric Weaknecht =

American politician (born c.1965)

Member of the Pennsylvania House of Representatives from the 5th district
- Incumbent
- Assumed office January 7, 2025
- Preceded by: Barry Jozwiak

Sheriff of Berks County
- In office January 7, 2008 – December 2, 2024
- Preceded by: Barry Jozwiak
- Succeeded by: Mandy Miller (acting)

Personal details
- Born: c. 1965 Berks County, Pennsylvania, U.S.
- Party: Republican
- Education: Kutztown Area High School

Eric J. Weaknecht (born c. 1965) is an American politician and former law enforcement officer who is the current representative for the 5th district in the Pennsylvania House of Representatives. A Republican, he assumed office in 2025. Weaknecht was previously the sheriff of Berks County, Pennsylvania from 2008 to 2024.

== Law enforcement career ==
Weaknecht began working as a deputy sheriff with the Sheriff's Office of Berks County, Pennsylvania in 1984. In 1996, Weaknecht was promoted to assistant chief deputy in charge of the court division. Three years later, Weaknecht became chief deputy sheriff. He was elected sheriff in 2007 and was reelected four times. In June 2012, Governor Tom Corbett appointed Weaknecht to the Deputy Sheriffs' Education and Training Board. Governor Tom Wolf would reappoint Weaknecht to an additional two terms. A month after his original appointment to the board, Weaknecht was elected secretary-treasurer of the Pennsylvania Sheriffs' Association.

Weaknecht was one of 70 American sheriffs who joined Protect America Now, a group founded by Mark Lamb, the sheriff of Pinal County, Arizona, to push for "election integrity" following President Donald Trump's false claims of massive voter fraud in the 2020 presidential election. Concerns about election integrity led Weaknecht to station armed officers at ballot drop boxes during the 2020 and 2022 elections.

== Political career ==
After Pennsylvania State Representative Barry Jozwiak retired in 2024, Weaknecht was elected to represent the 5th district after defeating Democratic candidate Heather Hanna in the general election.

== Political positions ==
Weaknecht opposes sanctuary city policies and red flag laws. He believes Pennsylvania has enough gun laws and should focus on enforcement rather than making new laws.

== Electoral history ==
2007 Berks County sheriff election
Party	Candidate	Votes	%
Republican	Eric Weaknecht	33,948	51.07
Democratic	Mike Garipoli	32,512	48.91
Write-in		16	0.02
Total votes		66,476	100.00

2011 Berks County sheriff election
Party	Candidate	Votes	%
Republican	Eric Weaknecht (incumbent)	34,233	65.42
Democratic	Daniel Billings	18,077	34.55
Write-in		15	0.03
Total votes		52,325	100.00

2015 Berks County sheriff election
Party	Candidate	Votes	%
Republican	Eric Weaknecht (incumbent)	37,167	65.05
Democratic	Lester Klock	19,954	34.93
Write-in		12	0.02
Total votes		57,133	100.00

2019 Berks County sheriff election
Party	Candidate	Votes	%
Republican	Eric Weaknecht (incumbent)	45,515	60.24
Democratic	Bart Ganster	30,004	39.71
Write-in		39	0.05
Total votes		75,558	100.00

2023 Berks County sheriff election
Party	Candidate	Votes	%
Democratic/Republican	Eric Weaknecht (incumbent)	72,918	99.23
Write-in		564	0.77
Total votes		73,482	100.00

2024 Pennsylvania House of Representatives election, District 5
Party	Candidate	Votes	%
Republican	Eric Weaknecht	23,664	66.66
Democratic	Heather Hanna	11,801	33.24
Write-in		36	0.10
Total votes		35,501	100.00
