= Leesport Lock House =

Historic house in Pennsylvania, United States

- U.S. National Register of Historic Places
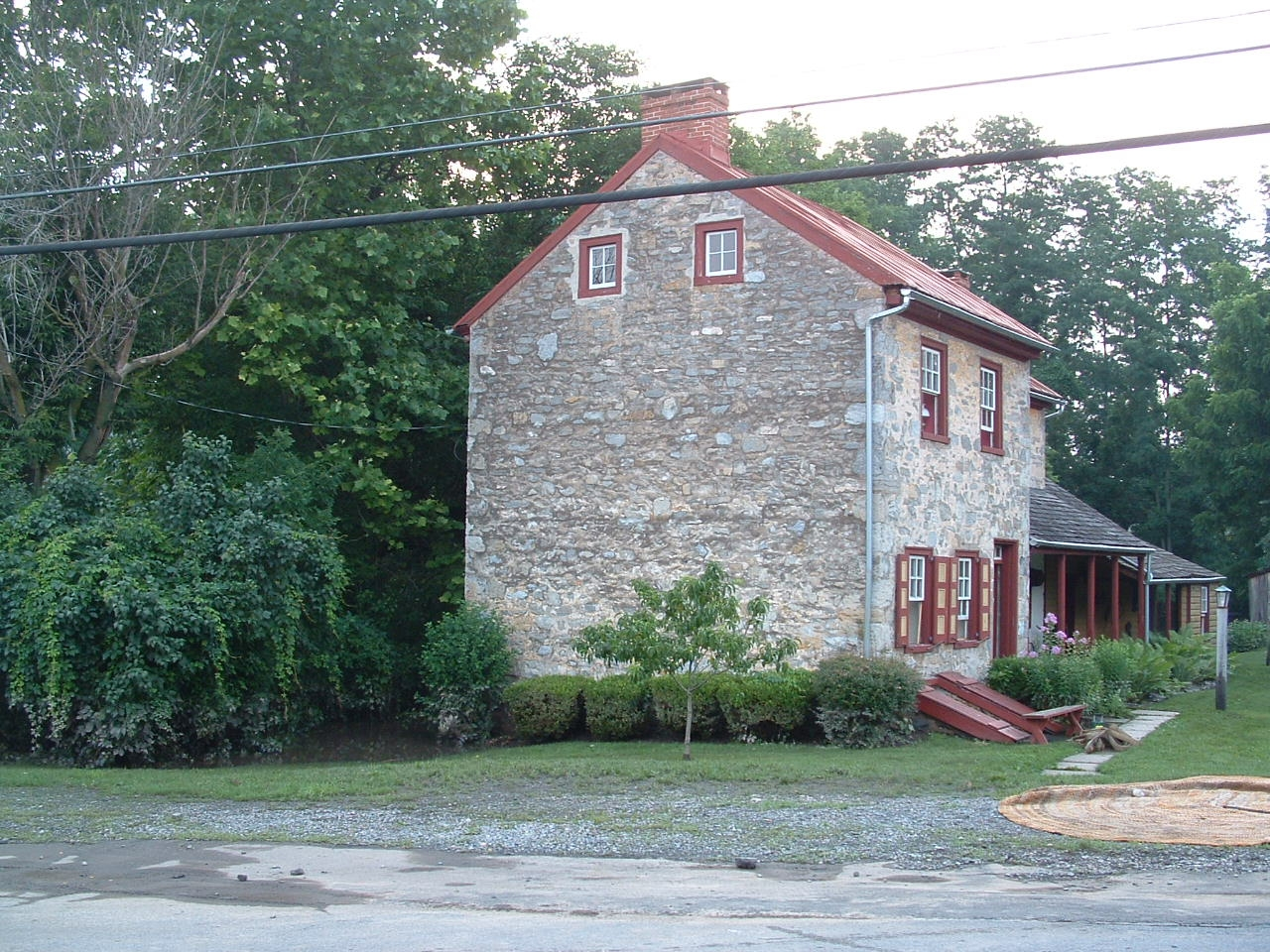
- The Lock House during the flood of 2006. Note the water behind the house from the Schuylkill River.

- Location within Pennsylvania Location within the United States
- Location: 27 E Wall St., Leesport, Pennsylvania
- Coordinates: 40°26′48″N 75°58′4″W
- Built: 1840
- Architect: Lee, Samuel
- Architectural style: English Farm House
- NRHP reference No.: 77001123
- Added to NRHP: June 09, 1977

The Leesport Lock House is a house accompanying a lock on the Schuylkill Canal in Leesport, Pennsylvania, USA. The house was built adjacent to the Leesport Locks #36 and #37 to allow canal barges to move quickly up and down the canal. The house was listed on the National Register of Historic Places on June 9, 1977. The property was purchased in 1975 by a group of teachers and school directors from the Schuylkill Valley School District. They organized the Leesport Lockhouse Foundation. After paying the no interest mortgage, provided by The First National Bank of Leesport, they turned title to the property over to Berks County. The County purchased the neighboring car wash, built over a section of the locks, and transferred ownership to the Borough of Leesport. The property and programs are administered by the Leesport Lockhouse Foundation, Inc.

== Location ==
The Lock House is located at 27 E Wall Street in Leesport, Pennsylvania, on the east side of the Schuylkill River. Adjacent the Lock House a car wash stood for many years, situated on the foundation of the lock. The lock walls can still be seen just above the remaining portion of the lower lock.

The Lock House is across the street from the Union Fire Company #1 of Leesport and the ambulance station of the Schuylkill Valley EMS.

== History ==
The Lock House was originally built in 1834 by the Schuylkill Navigation Company. The Schuylkill Navigation Company was chartered to build a series of navigation improvements in the Schuylkill River, allowing coal from the Coal Region to be delivered from Port Clinton to the ports in Philadelphia. The Schuylkill Navigation Company was the only means of carrying coal en-masse to Philadelphia for twenty years, until the Philadelphia and Reading Railroad was completed in 1841. Within only four years, the railroad was hauling three times the amount of coal as the Schuylkill Canal.

Although the canal continued to carry nearly two million tons of anthracite up through 1859, the Reading Railroad continued to transport more than the canal. In 1860, use of the canal started to decline. In 1869, a coal miners strike caused a shortage of material to be transported, a drought saw a severe drop in water levels in the canal, and severe flooding later damaged many portions of the canal. The Schuylkill Navigation Company struggled to find money to repair the damage, until it was ultimately leased to the Reading Railroad in 1870. By 1890, traffic on the canal was carrying less than a tenth of the cargo as it had during its most prosperous years.

However, the Lock House remained a symbol of economic growth in the Leesport area. Ultimately, both the canal and the railroad served to develop Leesport's economy.

== Today ==
The Lock House and surrounding grounds have been restored to their 1880–1910 condition and are maintained by the Leesport Lock House Foundation. The Lock House also hosts an annual Strawberry and Heritage Festival in early June.

Several relevant artifacts of the Lock House and other paraphernalia from the Schuylkill Canal can be found at the Hoss's Restaurant located just south of Leesport on the nearby Route 61.

== See also ==
- Schuylkill Canal
- Philadelphia and Reading Railroad
- Schuylkill Canal Association
