= John R. Evans =

American politician (born 1955)

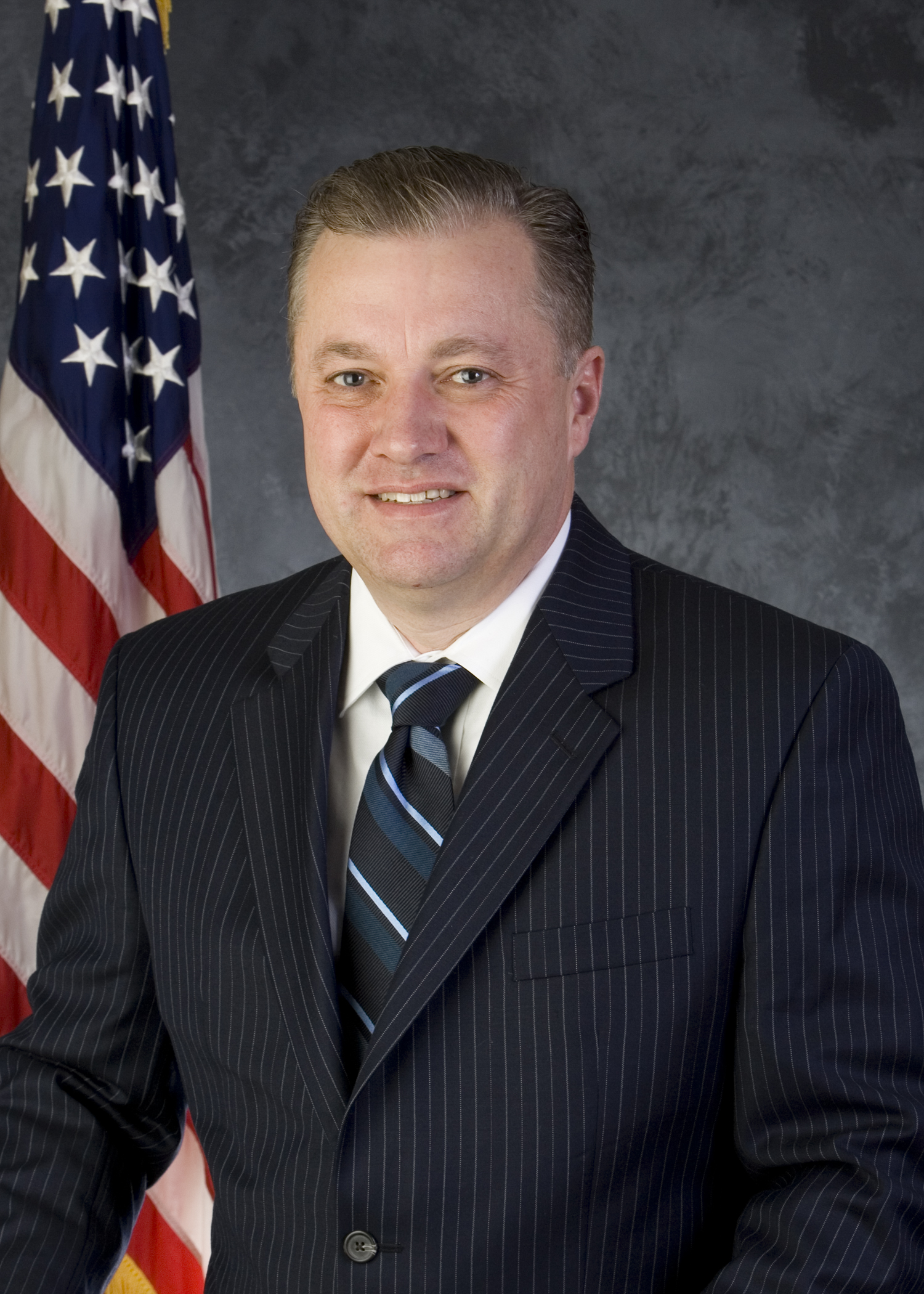

Member of the Pennsylvania House of Representatives from the 5th district
- In office January 02, 2001 – 2013
- Preceded by: R. Tracy Seyfert
- Succeeded by: Greg Lucas

Personal details
- Born: February 15, 1955 (age 71) Meadville, Pennsylvania
- Party: Republican
- Spouse: Stephanie
- Children: 3 children
- Education: Edinboro University: BA, Communication Studies; MA, Communications Studies
- Occupation: Adjunct professor, Penn State University; former Small Business Advocate, Commonwealth of PA; former news anchor

John R. Evans (born February 15, 1955) is a former Republican member of the Pennsylvania House of Representatives. He represented the 5th District from 2001 through 2013. Evans' district consisted of parts of Erie County and most of western Crawford County.

Evans is a graduate of Linesville High School, which was merged into Conneaut Area Senior High School. He holds degrees in communications from Edinboro University. Then he went on to become the sports director and later news reporter at WJET-TV in Erie. After broadcasting, he briefly worked for Erie Insurance.
