= Centre Township, Berks County, Pennsylvania =

Township in Pennsylvania, US

- Township
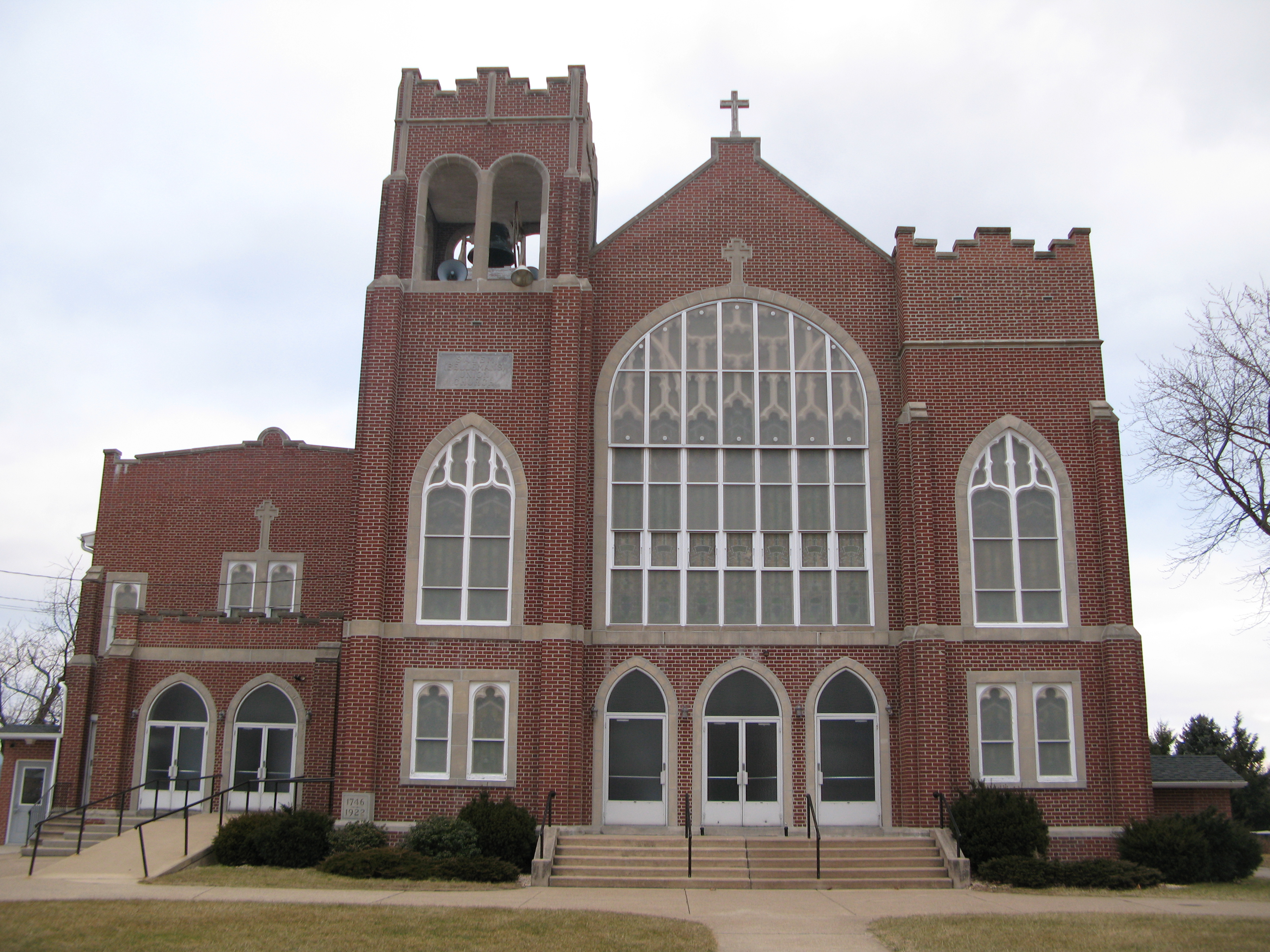
- Belleman's Union Church in Centre Township

- Location of Centre Township in Pennsylvania Centre Township (the United States)
- Coordinates: 40°30′06″N 76°00′59″W
- Country: United States
- State: Pennsylvania
- County: Berks

Area
  - Total: 21.58 sq mi (55.90 km^{2})
  - Land: 21.40 sq mi (55.42 km^{2})
  - Water: 0.19 sq mi (0.48 km^{2})
- Elevation: 371 ft (113 m)

Population (2020)
  - Total: 4,140 ▲
  - Estimate (2021): 4,149
  - Density: 190.3/sq mi (73.49/km^{2})
- Time zone: UTC-5 (EST)
  - Summer (DST): UTC-4 (EDT)
- Area code: 610
- FIPS code: 42-011-12344
- Website: centretownship.com

Centre Township is a township in Berks County, Pennsylvania, United States. The population was 4,140 at the 2020 census. It is in Schuylkill Valley School District.

== History ==
Belleman's Union Church was listed on the National Register of Historic Places in 1973.

== Geography ==
According to the U.S. Census Bureau, the township has a total area of 21.6 square miles (56 km^{2}), of which 21.4 square miles (55 km^{2}) is land and 0.2 square miles (0.52 km^{2}) (0.74%) is water. It contains the census-designated places of Dauberville and Mohrsville.

Adjacent townships

- Upper Bern Township (northwest)
- Tilden Township (north)
- Perry Township (northeast)
- Ontelaunee Township (southeast)
- Bern Township (south)
- Penn Township (west)

Adjacent boroughs

- Centerport (surrounded)
- Shoemakersville (northeast)
- Leesport (southeast)

== Demographics ==
Historical population
Census	Pop.	Note	%±
1980	2,329		—
1990	3,154		35.4%
2000	3,631		15.1%
2010	4,036		11.2%
2020	4,140		2.6%
2021 (est.)	4,149		0.2%
Source: US Census Bureau

At the 2000 census, there were 4,036 people, 1,511 households, and 1,157 families living in the township. The population density was 186.9 people per square mile. There were 1,570 housing units at an average density of 72.7/sq mi . The racial makeup of the township was 97.4% White, 0.8% African American, 0.1% Native American, 0.5% Asian, 0.9% from other races, and 0.4% from two or more races. Hispanic or Latino of any race were 2.5%.

There were 1,511 households, 29.5% had children under the age of 18 living with them, 66.9% were married couples living together, 5.1% had a female householder with no husband present, and 23.4% were non-families. 17.9% of households were made up of individuals, and 7.5% were one person aged 65 or older. The average household size was 2.67 and the average family size was 3.03.

The age distribution was 23.2% under the age of 18, 6.8% from 18 to 24, 24.1% from 25 to 44, 33.5% from 45 to 64, and 12.4% 65 or older. The median age was 43 years. Males made up 51.4% of the population and females made up 48.6%.

The median household income was $51,698 and the median family income was $58,056. Males had a median income of $36,972 versus $25,701 for females. The per capita income for the township was $20,718. About 4.1% of families and 5.6% of the population were below the poverty line, including 4.9% of those under age 18 and 6.5% of those age 65 or over.

== Transportation ==
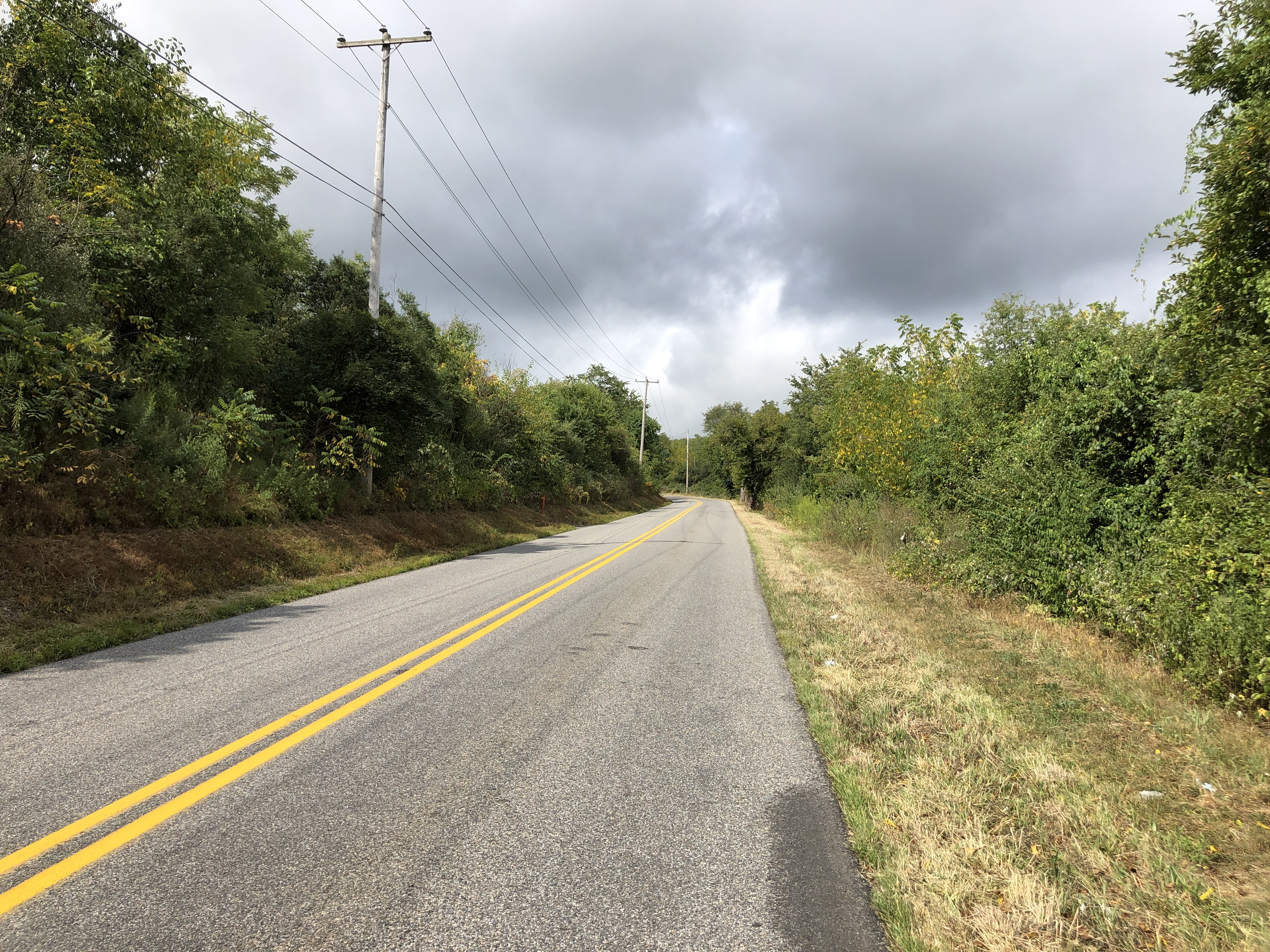
Shoey Road in Centre Township

As of 2010, there were 70.60 miles (113.62 km) of public roads in Centre Township, of which 21.59 miles (34.75 km) were maintained by the Pennsylvania Department of Transportation (PennDOT) and 49.01 miles (78.87 km) were maintained by the township.

No numbered highways serve Centre Township directly. Main thoroughfares in the township include Bellemans Church Road, Berne Road, Boundary Road, Garfield Road, Irish Creek Road, Main Street, Shartlesville Road, Shoey Road and Tilden Road. The nearest state highway is Pennsylvania Route 61, which passes just east of the township. Pennsylvania Route 61 is connected to the township by Main Street and Belleman's Church Road. Pennsylvania Route 183 is connected by Irish Creek Road, Plum Creek Road, and Garfield road to the township. US Route 22/Interstate 78 is accessible by Shartlesville Road from the township.
