= R. Tracy Seyfert =

American politician (born 1941)

Member of the Pennsylvania House of Representatives from the 5th district
- In office January 7, 1997 – June 1, 2000
- Preceded by: James F. Merry
- Succeeded by: John R. Evans

Personal details
- Born: December 2, 1941 (age 84) Bridgeport, Connecticut
- Party: Republican
- Education: Villa Maria College; Edinboro University; University of Pittsburgh
- Occupation: Psychologist

R. Tracy Seyfert (born December 2, 1941) is a former Republican member of the Pennsylvania House of Representatives, representing the 5th District from 1997 through her resignation in 2000.

Seyfert attended Mountain View Joint Schools. She earned her undergraduate degree from Villa Maria College (now part of Gannon University), her M.A. from Edinboro University of Pennsylvania, and a Ph.D. from University of Pittsburgh in 1988. She worked as a psychologist before joining the Erie County, Pennsylvania Council.

Seyfert won election in 1996, running on her experience as a member of the Erie County, Pennsylvania Council and her pledge to reduce the size of the Pennsylvania state government.

== Arrest and Trial ==
On September 9, 1999, federal and state investigators raided Seyfert's home, located in "Tracy's Ridge" in Millcreek Township, Pennsylvania, and seized a 10-ton (1,500 kilowatt) generating unit and 500-gallon oil tank. New units of that size cost $160,000 and require a crane and flatbed truck to move and are capable of supplying power to a coal mine, a lumber yard, or emergency power to the USX Tower. The total value of the units was less than $1,000.

Prosecutors alleged that in April 1999, Seyfert enlisted Elk Creek Township Supervisor Harold "Frosty" Crane to help her acquire the equipment, which was slated to be transferred to a volunteer fire department. Individuals are prohibited from acquiring such equipment through this program.

It is unclear what she wanted with the non-functioning unit, though employees suggested it was back up power for when the power grid might fail during the Y2K scare, in which all the computers in the world would malfunction. Seyfert pleaded guilty to theft of federal property and conspiring to influence a witness on May 12, 2000. In the plea agreement, prosecutors agreed to drop more serious charges that she attempted to have a witness change his testimony. The judge sentenced her to five years in federal prison and assessed a $5,000 fine. Seyfert was released from federal prison on March 20, 2001.

Joseph Wenzel, a former legislative aide and close associate of Seyfert, pleaded guilty to conspiracy to tamper with a witness in Seyfert's trial. Wenzel admitted to working with Seyfert to get Harold "Frosty" Crane to lie to the FBI during its investigation. In exchange for his guilty plea, federal prosecutors "agreed not to pursue accusations that Wenzel asked his brother to kill the witness.
