= Dauberville Bridge =

- U.S. National Register of Historic Places
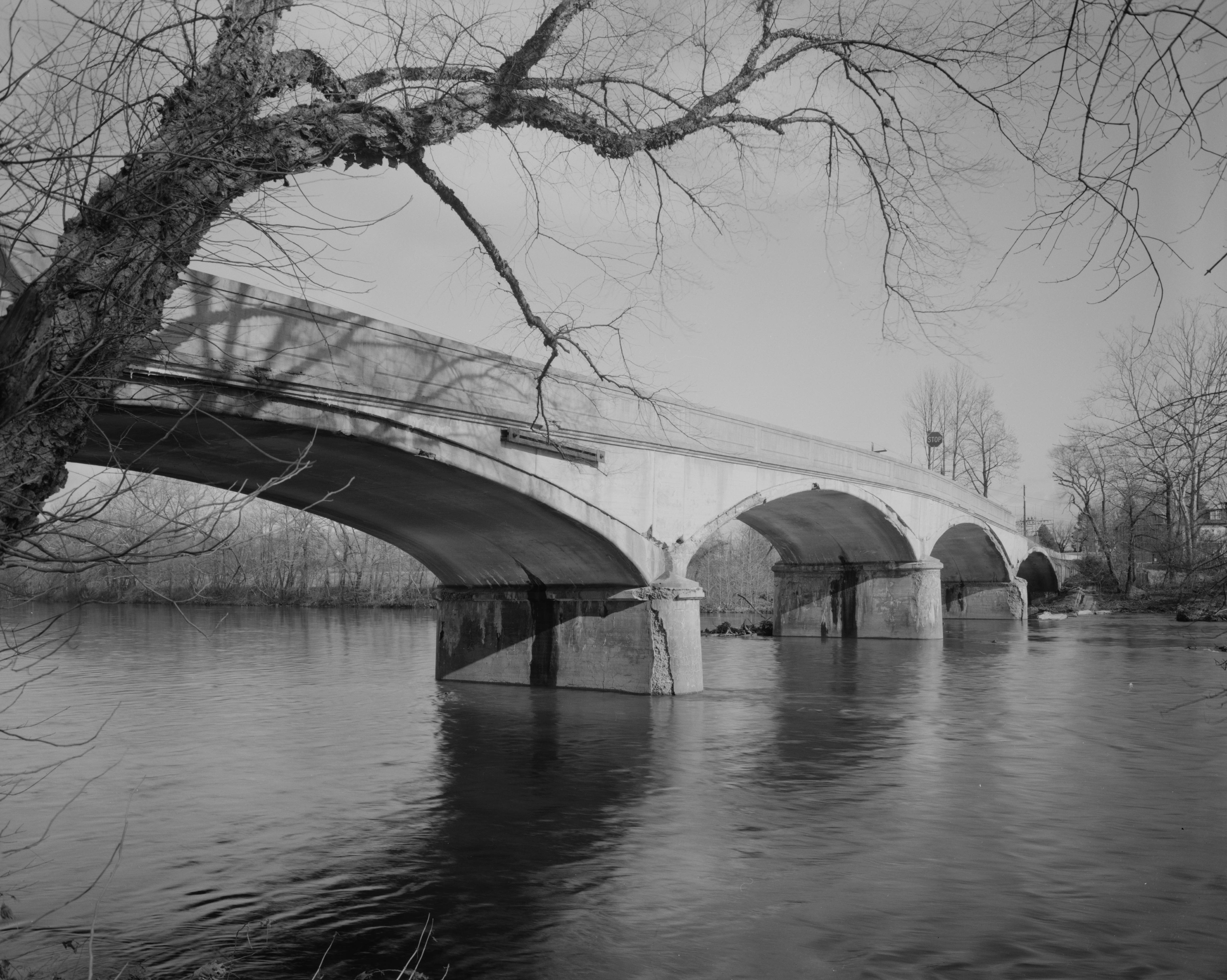
- Dauberville Bridge, circa 1988 (HAER Photo)

- Location within Pennsylvania Location within the United States
- Location: Belleman's Church Road over the Schuylkill River at Dauberville, Centre Township and Ontelaunee Township, Pennsylvania
- Coordinates: 40°27′25″N 75°58′37″W
- Area: less than one acre
- Built: 1908; Replaced 1991
- Built by: N.M. Davis, Levi H. Focht & Son, contractor
- Architectural style: Humpback multiple span arch
- MPS: Highway Bridges Owned by the Commonwealth of Pennsylvania, Department of Transportation TR
- NRHP reference No.: 88000788
- Added to NRHP: June 22, 1988

Dauberville Bridge was a historic concrete arch bridge spanning the Schuylkill River between Centre Township and Ontelaunee Township in Berks County, Pennsylvania. It was a multiple span 408-foot-long (124 m), concrete arch bridge with four spans, constructed in 1908. Each span was 75 feet (23 m) long. The bridge was demolished and replaced in 1991.

It was listed on the National Register of Historic Places in 1988.

== See also ==
- List of bridges documented by the Historic American Engineering Record in Pennsylvania
