= David S. Hayes =

American politician

Member of the Pennsylvania House of Representatives from the 5th district
- In office January 7, 1969 – June 23, 1980
- Preceded by: District created
- Succeeded by: James F. Merry

Personal details
- Born: December 31, 1941 (age 84) Erie, Pennsylvania
- Party: Republican

David Sayre Hayes (born December 31, 1941) is a former Republican member of the Pennsylvania House of Representatives.

Hayes graduated from Gannon University, where he was a member of Tau Kappa Epsilon fraternity.

== Crimes ==
He was arrested in Monroeville on October 26, 1979, for rape and involuntary deviate sexual intercourse. A 17-year-old male hitchhiker filed the complaint. Hayes was released on a $15,000 bond. At the time, he was serving as the chairman of the Federal-State Relations Committee.

Hayes was defeated in the 1980 primary to retain his seat. Hayes resigned after the loss. He testified during his trial and confirmed some of the accusations against him but denied the rape. The jury was deadlocked on those charges but convicted him of corrupting the morals of a teenaged student. Hayes was sentenced to one month to one year in prison and fined $2,000.

While Hayes appealed his conviction, his punishment was delayed, and he went to work in his family's business. In January 1984, he announced his intention to win back his seat from James R. Merry.

In 1990, Hayes was indicted again for transporting juveniles and adults across state lines for prostitution.
