= Greg Lucas =

American politician

Gregory S. Lucas

Member of the Pennsylvania House of Representatives from the 5th district
- In office 2013 – January 6, 2015
- Preceded by: John R. Evans
- Succeeded by: Barry Jozwiak

Personal details
- Born: September 15, 1960 (age 66) Edinboro, Pennsylvania, U.S.
- Party: Republican
- Spouse: Rose E. Lucas
- Education: California University of Pennsylvania
- Occupation: Teacher

Gregory S. Lucas (born September 15, 1960) was a Republican member of the Pennsylvania House of Representatives. He represented the 5th District. His district consisted of parts of Erie County including Edinboro and Washington Township, as well as most of western Crawford County.

Lucas is a graduate of General McLane High School. He holds a bachelor's degree in education from California University of Pennsylvania. Lucas returned to General McLane after college to serve as shop and drafting instructor. He simultaneously served as partner in a general contracting firm. In 2010, Lucas took a job as director of curriculum at the Erie branch of Fortis Institute. From 2004 through 2011, he served on the Edinboro Council, winning an election for mayor of the town in 2010.
