= Barry Jozwiak =

American politician

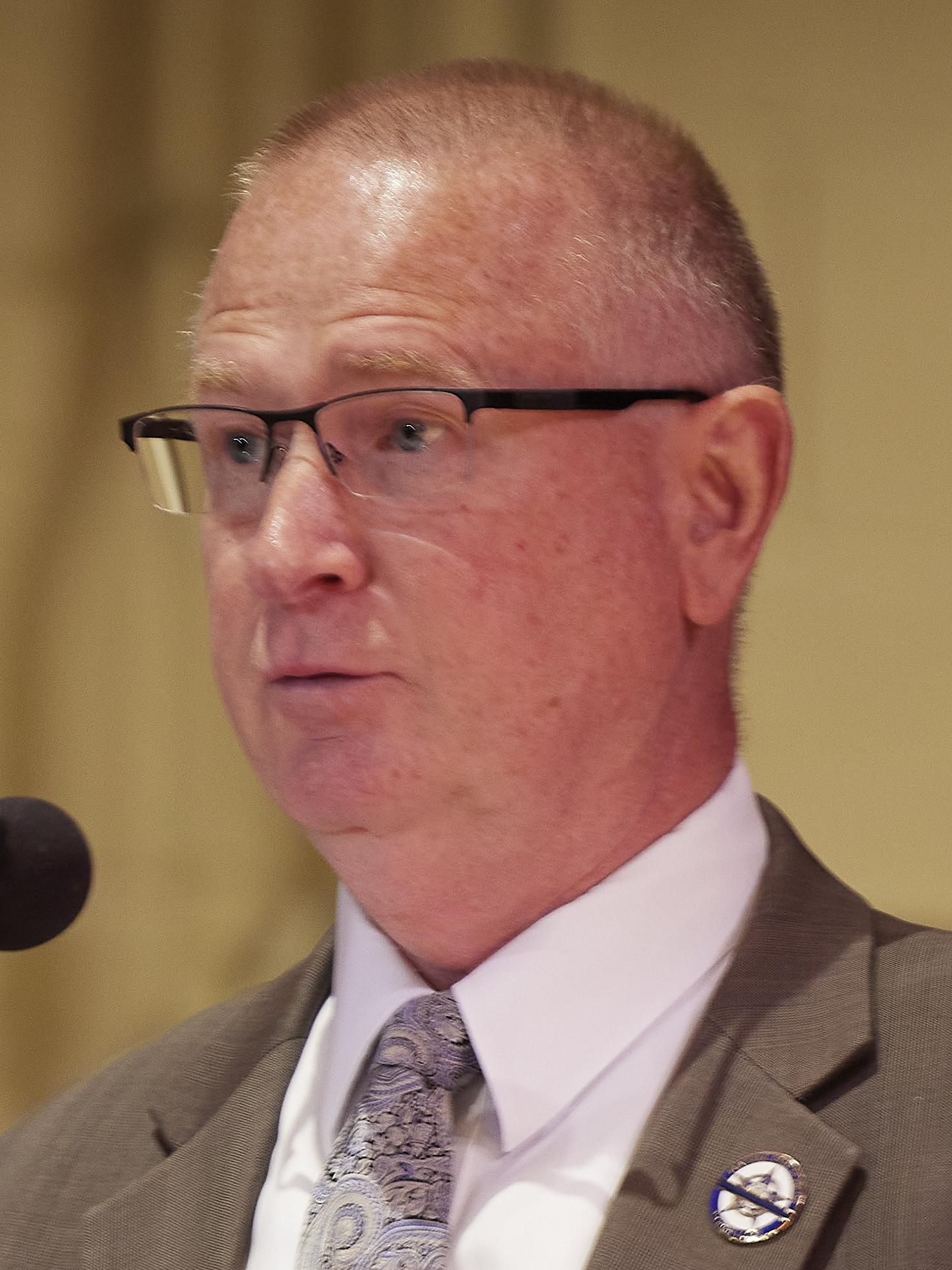

Member of the Pennsylvania House of Representatives from the 5th district
- Incumbent
- Assumed office January 6, 2015
- Preceded by: Greg Lucas

Personal details
- Born: December 21, 1945 (age 80) Hatfield, Hertfordshire, England
- Party: Republican
- Spouse: Margie G. Jozwiak
- Occupation: Retired Sheriff/Farmer

Barry J. Jozwiak (born December 21, 1945) was a member of the Pennsylvania House of Representatives for the 5th district made up of parts of Berks County. He is a member of the Republican Party.

== Personal ==
Jozwiak earned his associate degree in community services from Penn State University and his B.S. in law enforcement and corrections from Penn State University. His professional experience includes working as a Pennsylvania State Police trooper for 25 years and as Berks County sheriff for 12 years. Jozwiak attained the rank of third class petty officer before his honorable discharge from the US Navy. He served in the US Navy from December 1963 to December 1966.

== Political ==
Jozwiak served as a Bern Township Supervisor.

=== Committee assignments ===
- Commerce
- Game & Fisheries, Vice Chair
- Judiciary, Subcommittee on Crime and Corrections - Chair
- Liquor Control, Subcommittee on Licensing - Chair
