= Mohrsville, Pennsylvania =

Unincorporated community in Pennsylvania, US

- Census-designated place
- Location within Pennsylvania Location within the United States
- Coordinates: 40°28′49″N 75°58′55″W
- Country: United States
- State: Pennsylvania
- County: Berks
- Township: Centre

Area
  - Total: 0.65 sq mi (1.69 km^{2})
  - Land: 0.65 sq mi (1.69 km^{2})
  - Water: 0 sq mi (0.00 km^{2})
- Elevation: 361 ft (110 m)

Population (2020)
  - Total: 469
  - Density: 720/sq mi (278/km^{2})
- Time zone: UTC-5 (Eastern (EST))
  - Summer (DST): UTC-4 (EDT)
- ZIP codes: 19541
- FIPS code: 42-50280
- GNIS feature ID: 2631285

Mohrsville is a census-designated place in Centre Township, Berks County, Pennsylvania, United States. It is located approximately three miles south of the borough of Shoemakersville, along the Schuylkill River. As of the 2010 census, the population was 383 residents.

== Demographics ==
Mohrsville, like many similarly situated towns, has lost population in recent years. The number of residents in the city fell from 469 in 2020 to an estimated 341 in 2024.

Historical population
Census	Pop.	Note	%±
2020	469		—
U.S. Decennial Census

== Former train station ==
The SEPTA Pottsville Line once served Mohrsville. The service ceased in 1981 after all diesel services were cancelled.
