= James R. Merry =

American politician

Member of the Pennsylvania House of Representatives from the 5th district
- In office 1981–1996
- Preceded by: David S. Hayes
- Succeeded by: R. Tracy Seyfert

Personal details
- Born: August 21, 1927
- Died: February 1, 2001 (aged 73)
- Party: Republican

James R. Merry (August 21, 1927 – February 1, 2001) was a Republican member of the Pennsylvania House of Representatives.
