= Davies House (Berks County, Pennsylvania) =

Historic house in Pennsylvania, United States

- U.S. National Register of Historic Places
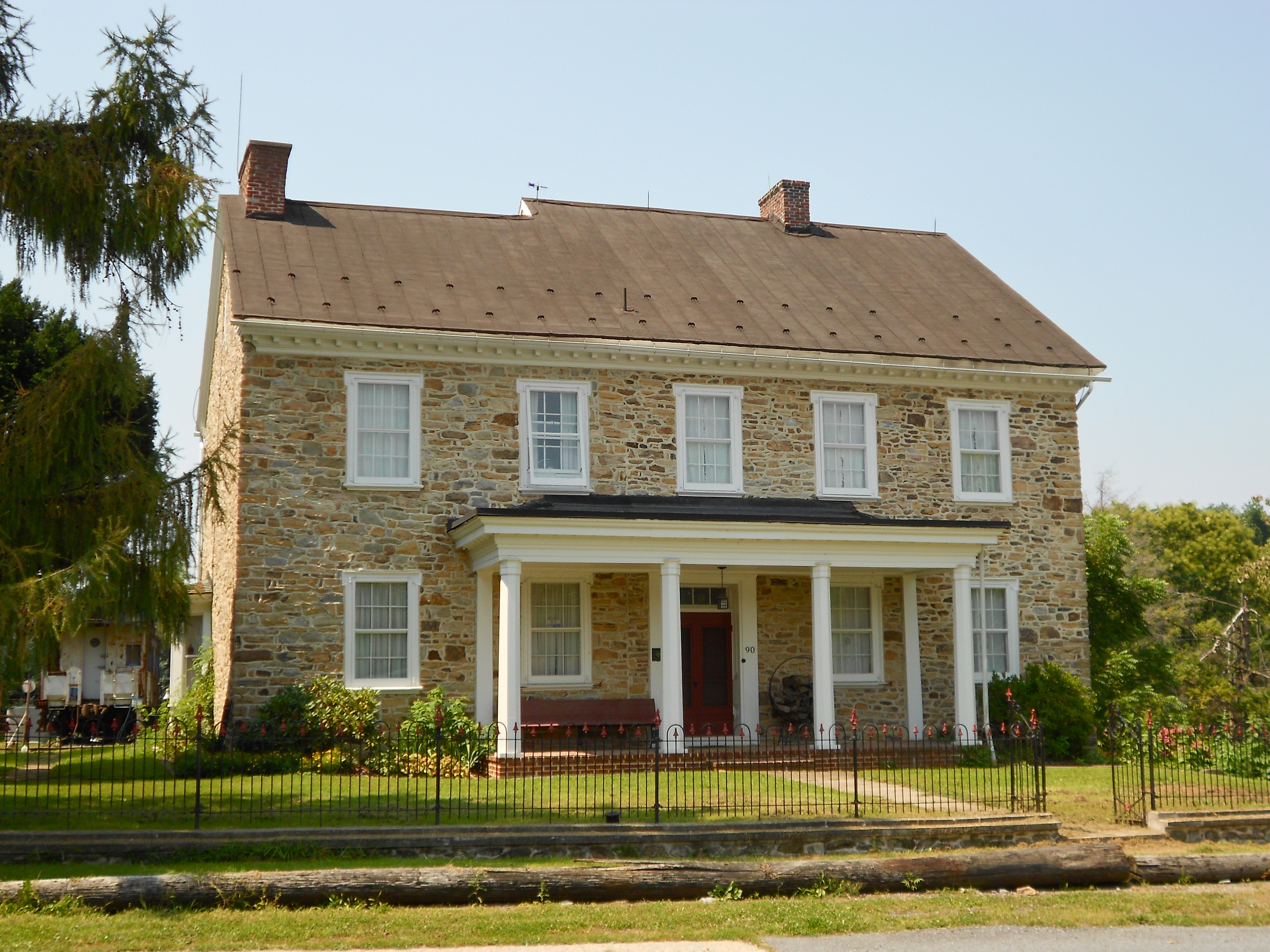
- The Davies House in 2013

- Location within Pennsylvania Location within the United States
- Location: Berkley Rd., Ontelaunee Township, Pennsylvania
- Coordinates: 40°25′39″N 75°56′6″W
- Area: 0.3 acres (0.12 ha)
- Built: 1767-1772
- Built by: Parvin, William; Davies, Edward & Luke
- Architectural style: Georgian, Federal
- NRHP reference No.: 82001530
- Added to NRHP: November 14, 1982

Davies House, also known as "Twin Spruce," is a historic home located in Ontelaunee Township, Berks County, Pennsylvania. It was built between 1767 and 1772, and is a 2 1/2-story, fieldstone dwelling with a gable roof. It has a two-story, stone and frame addition to the west, with a one-story half gable addition on that. The additions were completed by 1835. It is Georgian in style with Federal style details. Also on the property is a contributing stone smokehouse / cold cellar.

It was listed on the National Register of Historic Places in 1982.
