= Leesport, Pennsylvania =

Borough in Pennsylvania, US

- Borough
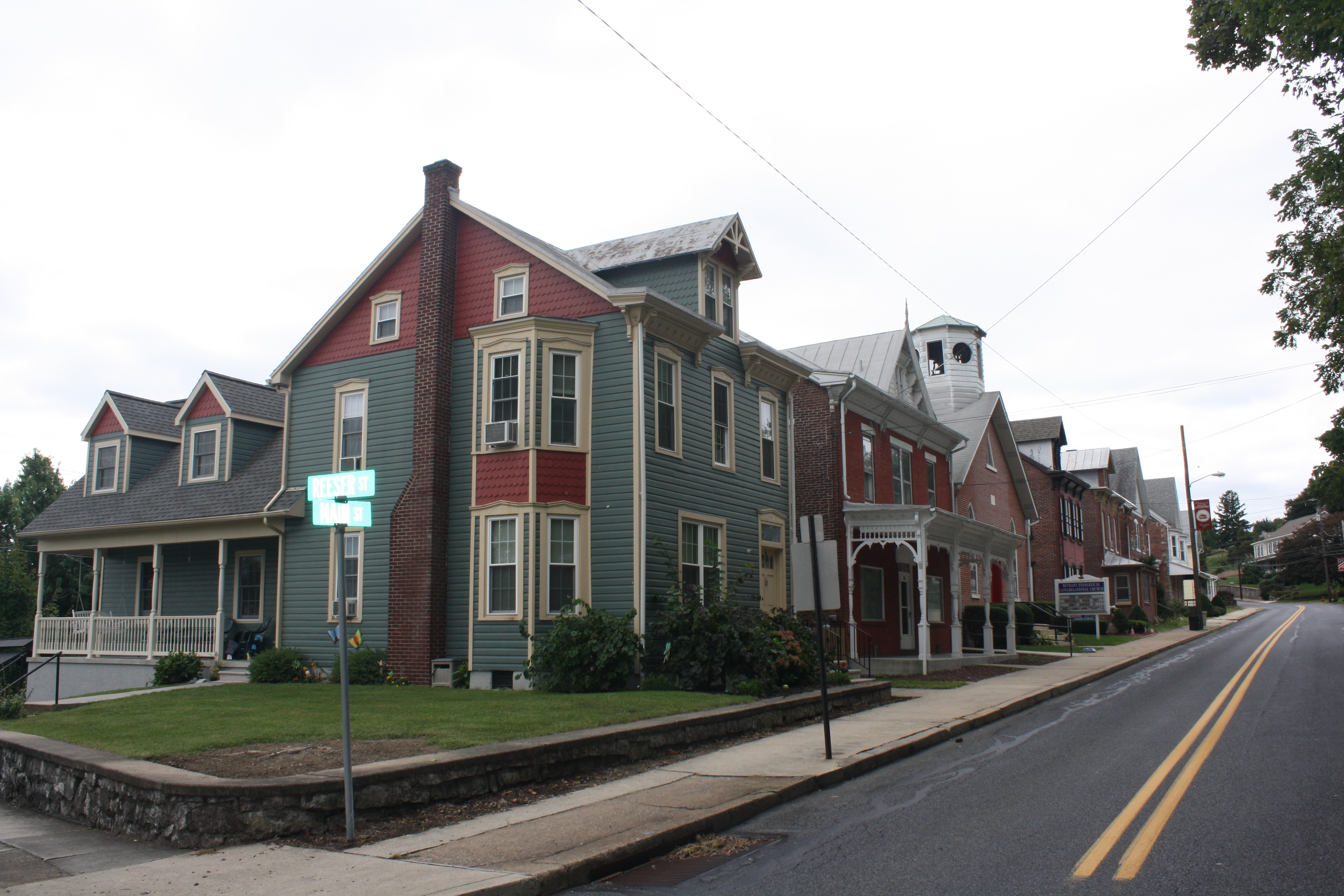
- Main Street in Leesport

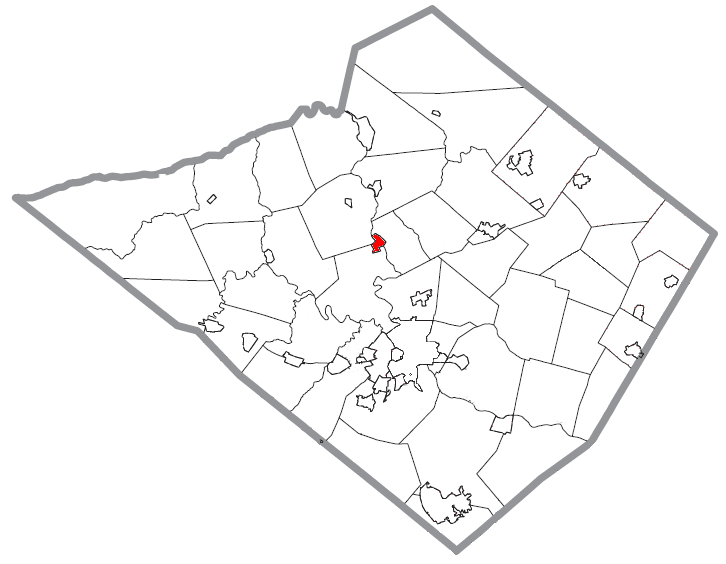
- Location of Leesport in Berks County, Pennsylvania

- Location in Pennsylvania Location in the United States
- Coordinates: 40°26′38″N 75°58′05″W
- Country: United States
- State: Pennsylvania
- County: Berks

Area
  - Total: 0.75 sq mi (1.95 km^{2})
  - Land: 0.73 sq mi (1.88 km^{2})
  - Water: 0.027 sq mi (0.07 km^{2})
- Elevation: 299 ft (91 m)

Population (2020)
  - Total: 1,954
  - Density: 2,693.9/sq mi (1,040.12/km^{2})
- Time zone: UTC-5 (EST)
  - Summer (DST): UTC-4 (EDT)
- ZIP Code: 19533
- Area code: 610
- FIPS code: 42-42352
- Website: https://leesport.org/

Leesport is a borough in Berks County, Pennsylvania, United States. The population was 1,954 at the 2020 census.

The Schuylkill River passes through Leesport.

== History ==
Leesport is named for Samuel Lee, who in 1840, laid out building lots.

A post office was established in 1851. An anthracite furnace owned by the Leesport Iron Company was built in 1853. Leesport was described in 1876 as "a flourishing village", with a station of the Philadelphia and Reading Railroad.

In 1957, West Leesport, a borough located directly across the Schuylkill River, was incorporated into Leesport.

== Geography ==
According to the U.S. Census Bureau, the borough has a total area of 0.8 square miles (2.1 km^{2}), of which 0.7 square miles (1.8 km^{2}) is land and 0.04 square miles (0.10 km^{2}) (4.00%) is water.

Bern Township, Centre Township and Ontelaunee Township all border Leesport.

== Demographics ==
Historical population
Census	Pop.	Note	%±
1910	436		—
1920	419		−3.9%
1930	464		10.7%
1940	489		5.4%
1950	535		9.4%
1960	1,138		112.7%
1970	1,158		1.8%
1980	1,258		8.6%
1990	1,270		1.0%
2000	1,805		42.1%
2010	1,918		6.3%
2020	1,954		1.9%

As of the 2020 census, The racial makeup of the borough was 84.1% White, 1.1% African American, 1.1% Native American, 0.6% Asian, and 3.3% from two or more races. Hispanic or Latino people of any race were 9.6% of the population.

As of the 2010 census, there were 1,918 people, 747 households, and 523 families living in the borough. The population density was 2,740 inhabitants per square mile (1,060/km^{2}). There were 790 housing units at an average density of 1,128.6 per square mile (435.8/km^{2}). The racial makeup of the borough was 90.6% White, 1.5% African American, 0.3% Native American, 0.6% Asian, 1.4% from other races, and 1.4% from two or more races. Hispanic or Latino people of any race were 4.2% of the population.

There were 747 households, out of which 36.5% had children under the age of 18 living with them, 53.3% were married couples living together, 11.5% had a female householder with no husband present, and 30% were non-families. 36.5% of all households were made up of individuals, and 20.6% had someone living alone who was 65 years of age or older. The average household size was 2.57 and the average family size was 3.03.

In the borough, the population was spread out, with 25.0% under the age of 18, 8.8% from 18 to 24, 27.2% from 25 to 44, 28% from 45 to 64, and 11% who were 65 years of age or older. The median age was 37.7 years. Females made up 50.4% of the population and males made up 49.6%.

The median income for a household in the borough was $47,067, and the median income for a family was $51,761. Males had a median income of $36,453 versus $25,833 for females. The per capita income for the borough was $20,148. About 2.2% of families and 4.0% of the population were below the poverty line, including 2.6% of those under age 18 and 9.3% of those age 65 or over.

When used as a mailing address, Leesport (ZIP Code 19533) also includes Ontelaunee Township and portions of Bern Townships.

== Arts and culture ==
Leesport Lock House are listed on the National Register of Historic Places.

== Education ==
The area is served by the Schuylkill Valley School District.

== Infrastructure ==
=== Transportation ===
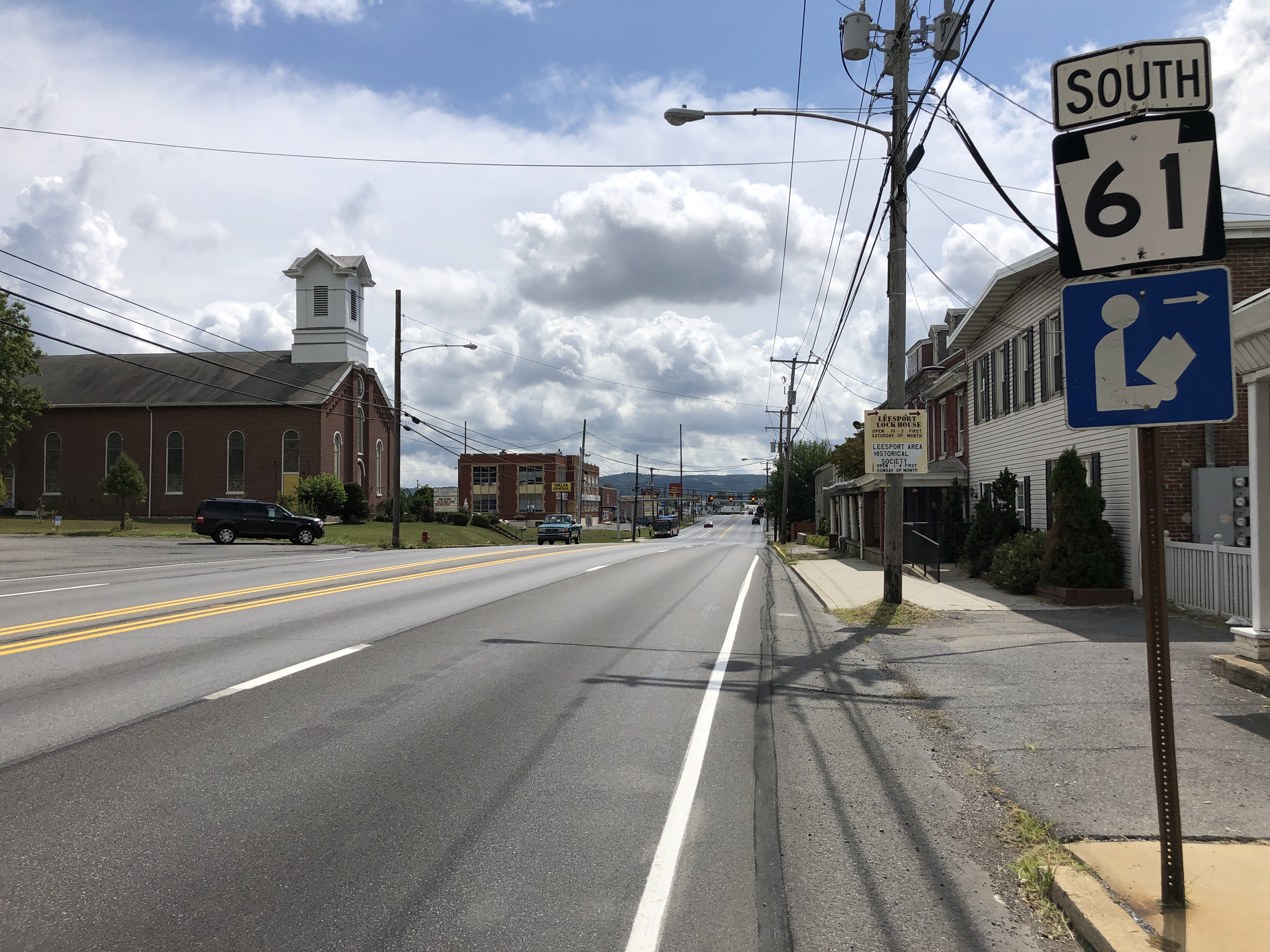
PA 61 southbound in Leesport

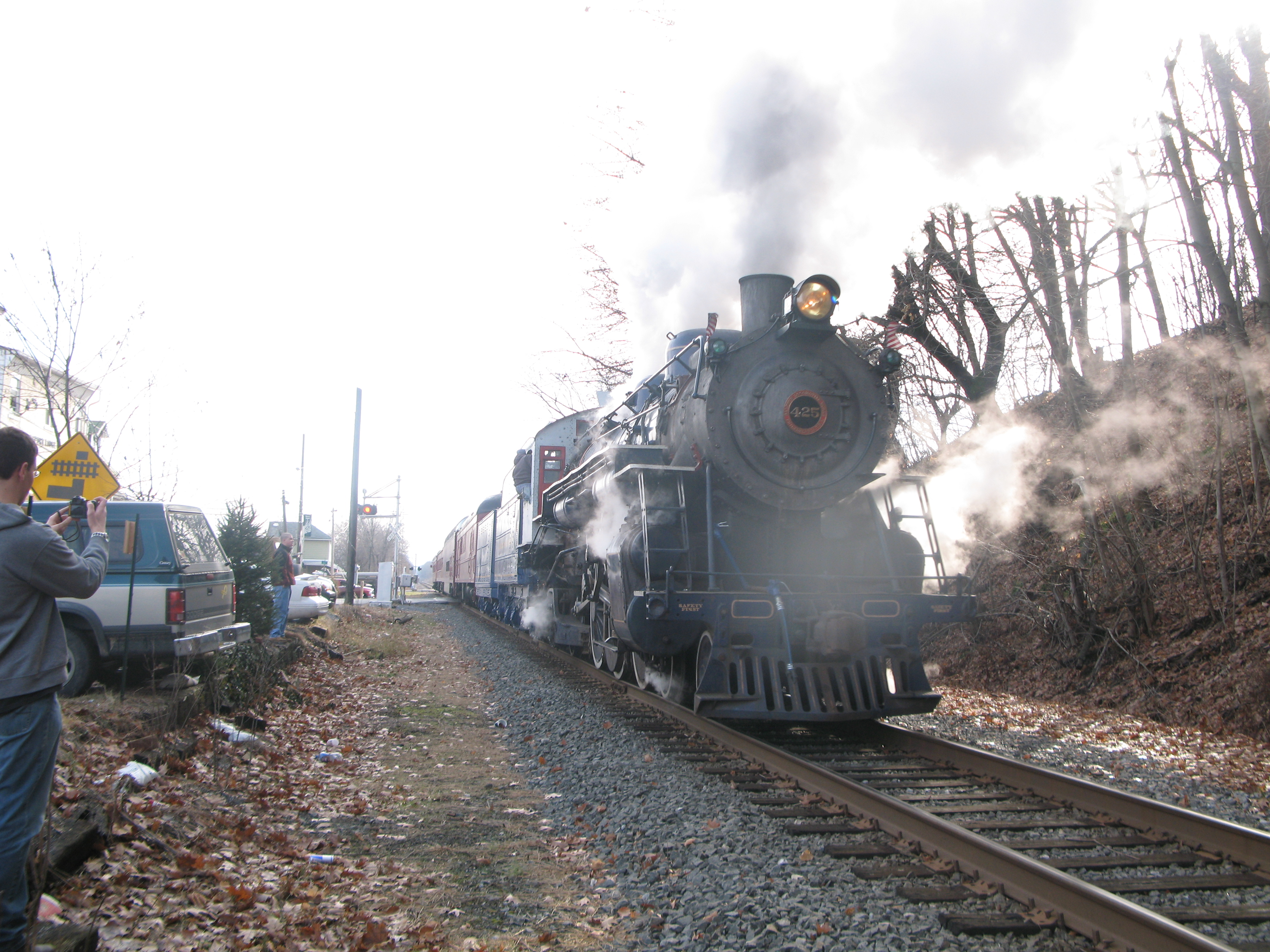
Reading Blue Mountain and Northern Railroad heritage steam train in Leesport

As of 2010, there were 9.55 miles (15.37 km) of public roads in Leesport, of which 2.33 miles (3.75 km) were maintained by the Pennsylvania Department of Transportation (PennDOT) and 7.22 miles (11.62 km) were maintained by the borough.

Pennsylvania Route 61 runs northwest-southeast through Leesport on Centre Avenue, heading south to Reading and north to Hamburg and Pottsville. Pennsylvania Route 73 begins at PA 61 south of Leesport and heads southeast to Blandon and eventually Philadelphia.

Berks Area Regional Transportation Authority (BARTA) provides bus service to Leesport along Route 20, which follows PA 61 on its route between Hamburg to the north and the BARTA Transportation Center in Reading to the south. There is a park and ride lot at the Redner's in Leesport that is served by BARTA.

SEPTA's Pottsville Line once provided passenger rail service to Leesport, with service to Pottsville, Reading, and Philadelphia. The service ceased in 1981 after all diesel services were cancelled. Freight service in Leesport is provided by the Reading Blue Mountain and Northern Railroad, which operates a branch line between Hamburg and Temple through Leesport and its Reading Division mainline through West Leesport.

=== Emergency services ===
Emergency services are provided by the Northern Berks Regional Police Department, Union Fire Company of Leesport, and Schuylkill Valley EMS all of which are dispatched by the Berks County Communications Center.

== Notable people ==
- Sheila Butler, visual artist
- Doug Clemens, professional athlete
