= Schuylkill Valley School District =

School district in Pennsylvania

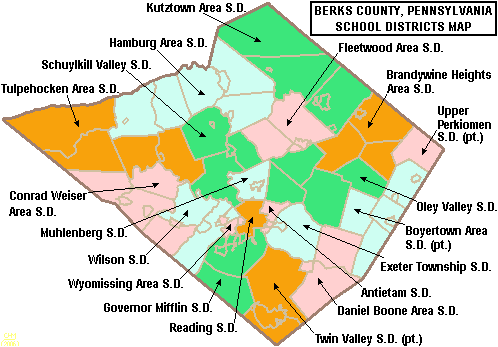

Location
- Leesport, Pennsylvania United States

District information
- Motto: In ourselves our future lies
- Grades: K-12

Students and staff
- Students: 1,900
- Teachers: 140
- Staff: 100
- District mascot: Panther
- Colors: Red and black

Other information
- Schedule: Quarter System
- Website: www.schuylkillvalley.org

Schuylkill Valley is a school district located in Berks County, Pennsylvania. The name derives from the Schuylkill River, which flows through the valley where the district is located.

== Geography ==
Schuylkill Valley is located in southeastern Pennsylvania, near the heart of Pennsylvania Dutch Country. The district lies in the valley created by the Blue Mountain to the north and the Schuylkill River to the south. It encompasses approximately 53 square miles (140 km^{2}), including the municipalities of Bern, Centre, and Ontelaunee Townships and the boroughs of Leesport and Centerport. The district is both rural and suburban, including farmland as well as business and light industry.

== History ==
Schuylkill Valley was formed out of Ontelaunee School District in 1958. The old high school and elementary schools in Centre and Bern Township, built in the early 1900s, were kept in use until new facilities were constructed. A new high school was constructed in 1961 and a middle school was built adjacent to the high school in 1975. It wasn't until 1995 that the aging elementary schools were merged into a new building, sharing campus space with the middle and high school.

In 2001, an expansion of the high school added an auxiliary gym and expanded musical facilities for band, chorus, and theater programs.

In 2008, fifth grade was moved from the elementary school after completion of a middle school expansion project. The renovation also added an auditorium, a new cafeteria, and teaching areas.

During the summer of 2010, the high school auditorium underwent renovations with total cost of the project approaching, if not exceeding, $500,000. It included new carpeting, sound booth/room, re-finished stage, new acoustics for the roof, and other additions.

In the year of 2017, a new, renovated stadium was constructed from the beginning of the summer of 2017, to the end of October 2017. The project cost approximately 1 million dollars.

== Campus ==
The Schuylkill Valley School District campus is located at the intersection of Route 61 and Route 73, 1-mile (1.6 km) south of Leesport and 6 miles (9.7 km) north of Reading.

The district operates three schools, all located on the campus:

- Schuylkill Valley Elementary School, serving grades K-4
- Schuylkill Valley Middle School, serving grades 5-8
- Schuylkill Valley High School, serving grades 9-12

== Sports offered ==
Athletics are an integral part of Schuylkill Valley's curriculum.

Fall sports

- Men's and women's Schuylkill Valley youth baseball 18 and under, spring, summer and fall
- Women's tennis
- Women's volleyball
- Men's soccer
- Men's football
- Men and women's cross-country
- Co-ed cheerleading
- Women's field hockey
- Women's soccer

Winter sports

- Men's wrestling
- Men and women's basketball
- Men and women's swimming and diving
- Co-ed cheerleading
- Men and women's bowling

Spring sports

- Men's volleyball
- Men tennis
- Men and women's track and field
- Men's baseball
- Women's softball
- Co-ed cheerleading

Club sports

- Rock climbing
- SVGSA 18 and under softball

== Alma mater ==
Schuylkill Valley High School's Alma Mater was written by James Rieser. Although the Alma Mater is written on Page 2 of the standard student planner, it has not been mentioned or sung throughout the High School curriculum since the 1980s, except during commencement and graduation ceremonies.

Let us all unite and sing,
Our song of praise to thee,
With honor, laud, and glory.
We will true and faithful be.
Gratitude we owe to you,
And homage now we'll pay.
For you're our ALMA MATER dear-
Our guidepost everyday.

Let's sing of mem'ries that we know,
Of joy within our soul,
As day by day we onward go,
Straightforward toward our goal.
Now raise a toast to classmates dear,
To newer paths untrod,
For red and black let's give a cheer,
Toward victory we will plod.

Time honored SCHUYLKILL VALLEY,
Thy walls to us are dear,
Oh how can we forget thee,
Or the times that we've spent here?
Our ALMA MATER e'er you'll be,
And in our hearts will rule,
Forever steadfast, true-
SCHUYLKILL VALLEY HIGH SCHOOL
