= Ontelaunee Township, Pennsylvania =

Township in Pennsylvania, US

Ontelaunee Township
- Township
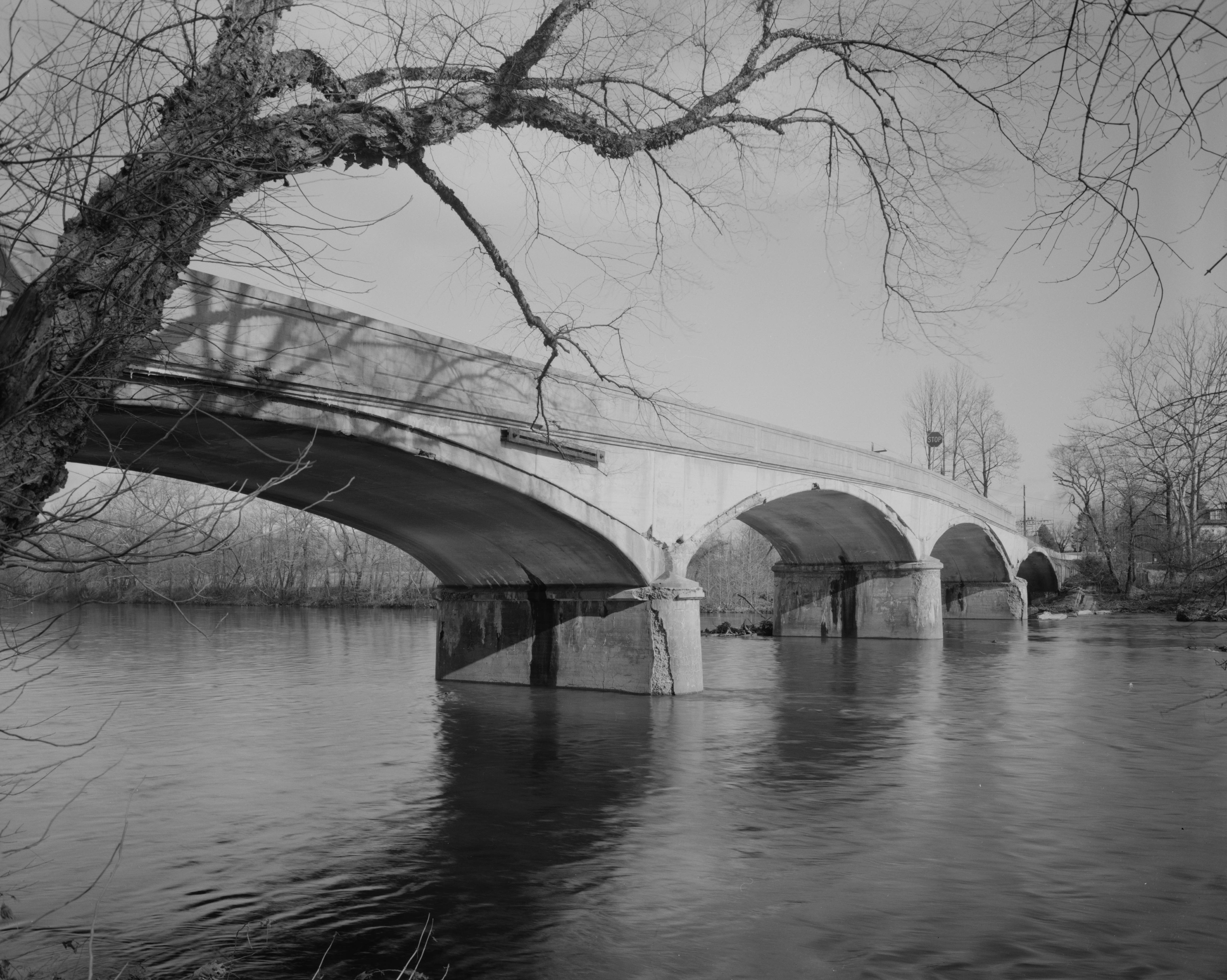
- Dauberville Bridge over the Schuylkill River

- Location of Ontelaunee Township in Pennsylvania Ontelaunee Township (the United States)
- Coordinates: 40°26′36″N 75°56′18″W
- Country: United States
- State: Pennsylvania
- County: Berks

Area
  - Total: 9.36 sq mi (24.24 km^{2})
  - Land: 8.69 sq mi (22.50 km^{2})
  - Water: 0.68 sq mi (1.75 km^{2})
- Elevation: 341 ft (104 m)

Population (2010)
  - Total: 1,646
  - Estimate (2016): 1,893
  - Density: 217.9/sq mi (84.14/km^{2})
- Time zone: UTC-5 (EST)
  - Summer (DST): UTC-4 (EDT)
- ZIP Codes: 19510, 19533, 19605
- Area code: 610
- FIPS code: 42-011-56856
- Website: https://ontelauneetwp.net/

Ontelaunee Township is a township in Berks County, Pennsylvania, United States. The population was 1,646 at the 2010 census.

== History ==
Ontelaunee Township was organized in 1849. Ontelaunee is the Native American word for Maiden Creek.

The Berkley Historic District and Davies House are listed on the National Register of Historic Places.

== Geography ==
According to the U.S. Census Bureau, the township has a total area of 9.2 square miles (23.8 km^{2}), of which 8.6 square miles (22.2 km^{2}) is land and 0.6 square miles (1.6 km^{2})(6.63%) is water.

Adjacent townships

- Perry Township (north)
- Maidencreek Township (east)
- Muhlenberg Township (south)
- Bern Township (southwest)
- Centre Township (northwest)

The borough of Leesport is bounded on the west of Ontelaunee Township.

== Demographics ==
At the 2000 census, there were 1,217 people, 516 households, and 347 families living in the township. The population density was 141.7 inhabitants per square mile (54.7/km^{2}). There were 555 housing units at an average density of 64.6 per square mile (24.9/km^{2}). The racial makeup of the township was 96.22% White, 0.08% African American, 0.25% Native American, 0.49% Asian, 1.97% from other races, and 0.99% from two or more races. Hispanic or Latino of any race were 3.29%.

There were 516 households, 21.1% had children under the age of 18 living with them, 56.8% were married couples living together, 5.8% had a female householder with no husband present, and 32.6% were non-families. 25.2% of households were made up of individuals, and 11.6% were one person aged 65 or older. The average household size was 2.36 and the average family size was 2.81.

Historical population
Census	Pop.	Note	%±
1980	1,408		—
1990	1,359		−3.5%
2000	1,217		−10.4%
2010	1,646		35.3%
2016 (est.)	1,893		15.0%
Source: US Census Bureau

The age distribution was 18.7% under the age of 18, 5.8% from 18 to 24, 30.0% from 25 to 44, 26.6% from 45 to 64, and 18.8% 65 or older. The median age was 43 years. For every 100 females there were 104.2 males. For every 100 females age 18 and over, there were 103.1 males.

The median household income was $51,058 and the median family income was $60,089. Males had a median income of $36,597 versus $22,679 for females. The per capita income for the township was $24,996. About 2.2% of families and 3.1% of the population were below the poverty line, including 1.4% of those under age 18 and 9.9% of those age 65 or over.

== Neighborhoods ==
- Berkley Historic District
- Furnace Row
- Indian Manor
- The Harvest
- Willow Glen
- Willow Glen North

== Current government and school district ==
The area is served by the Schuylkill Valley School District.

Emergency services are provided by the Northern Berks Regional Police Department, Union Fire Company of Leesport, and Northern Berks EMS all of which are dispatched by the Berks County Communications Center.

== Transportation ==
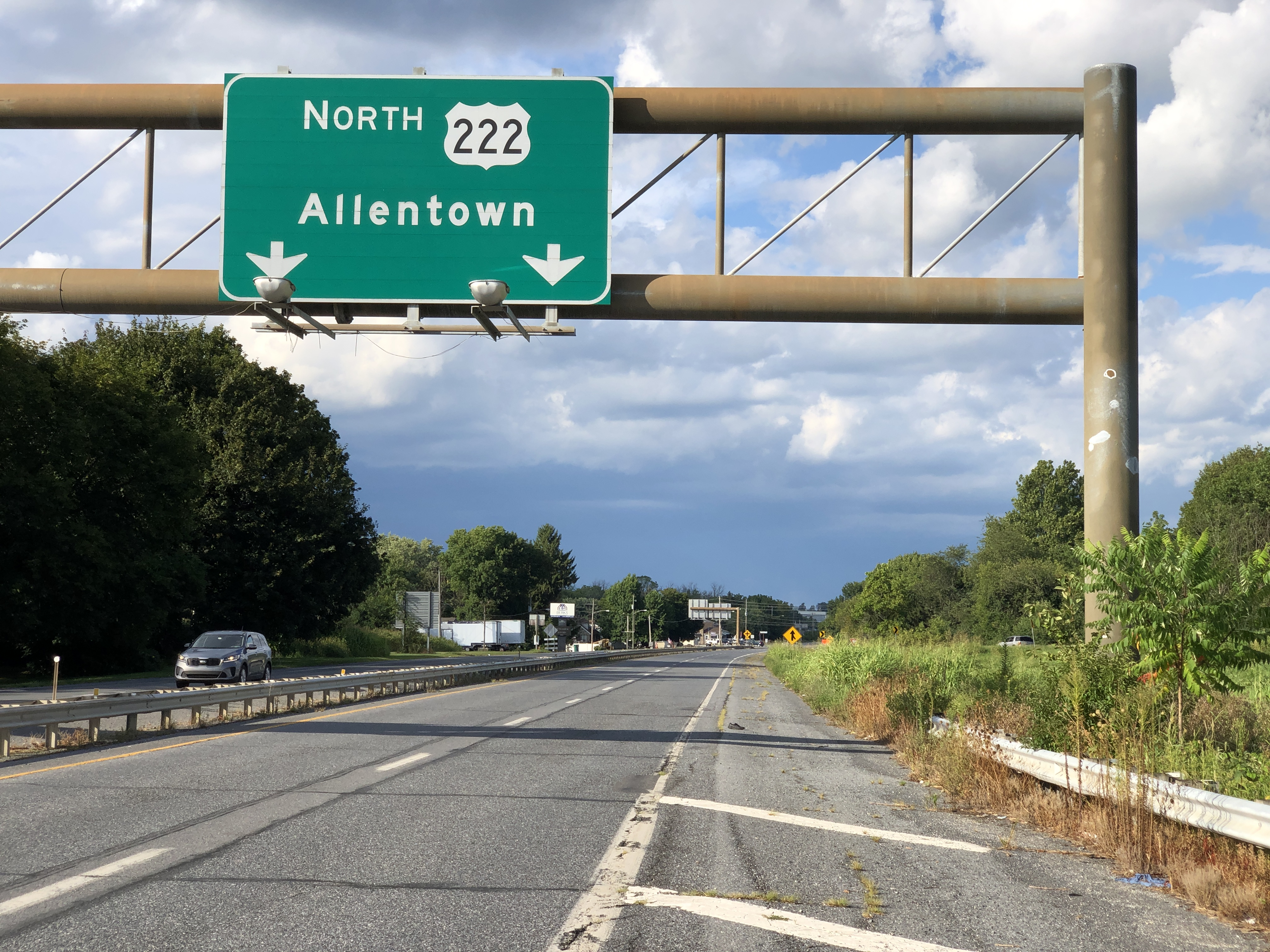
US 222 northbound past US 222 Business in Ontelaunee Township

As of 2021, there were 37.29 miles (60.01 km) of public roads in Ontelaunee Township, of which 16.82 miles (27.07 km) were maintained by the Pennsylvania Department of Transportation (PennDOT) and 20.47 miles (32.94 km) were maintained by the township.

U.S. Route 222 is the most prominent highway serving Ontelaunee Township. It follows a southwest-northeast alignment across the southeastern portion of the township. U.S. Route 222 Business begins at US 222 and heads southward in the southeastern corner of the township. Pennsylvania Route 61 follows Pottsville Pike along a northwest-southeast alignment across the western portion of the township. Finally, Pennsylvania Route 73 follows Lake Shore Drive northeastward from PA 61 across the central portion of the township.
