= Centerport, Pennsylvania =

Borough in Pennsylvania, US

- Borough
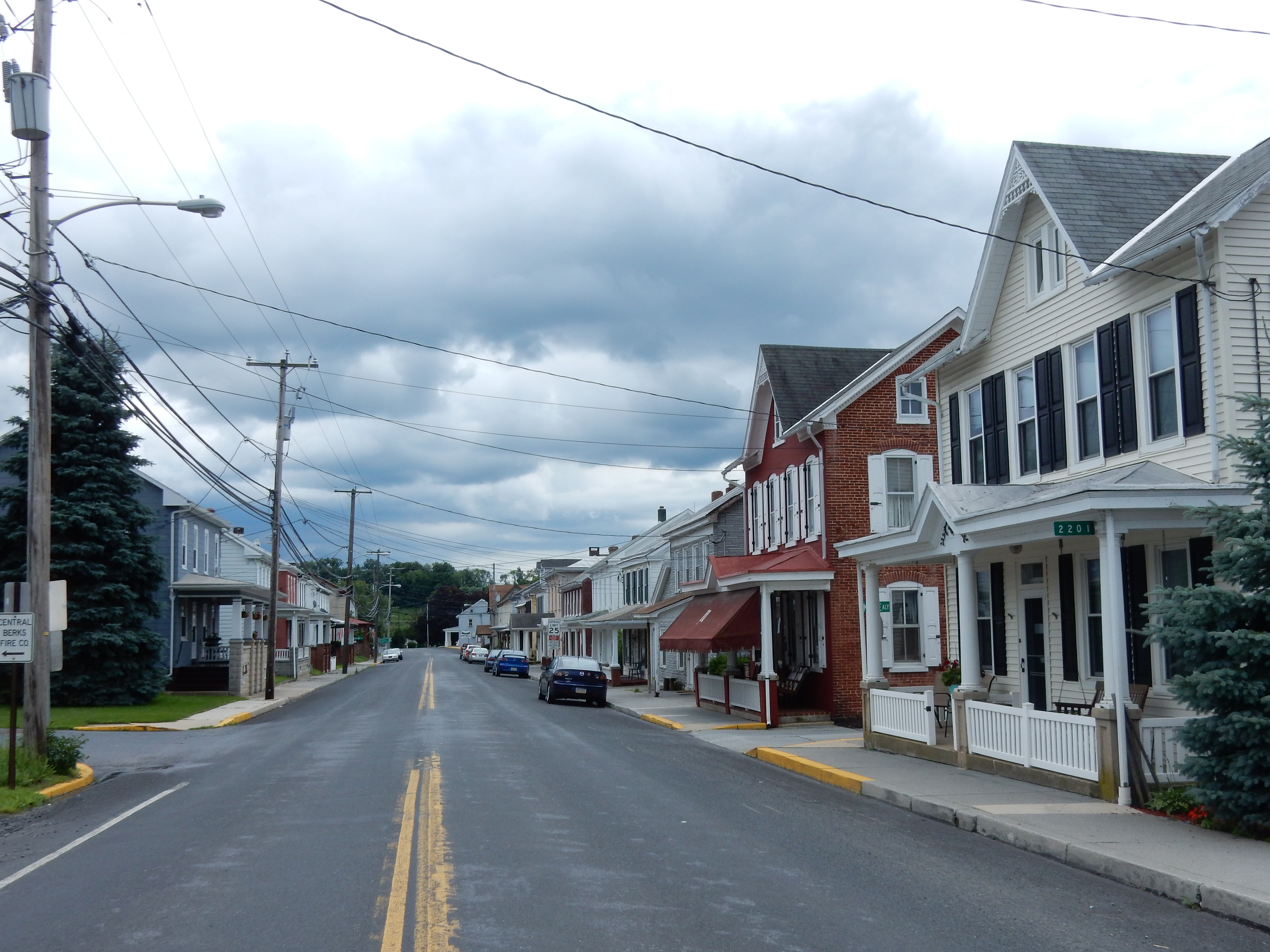
- Main Street

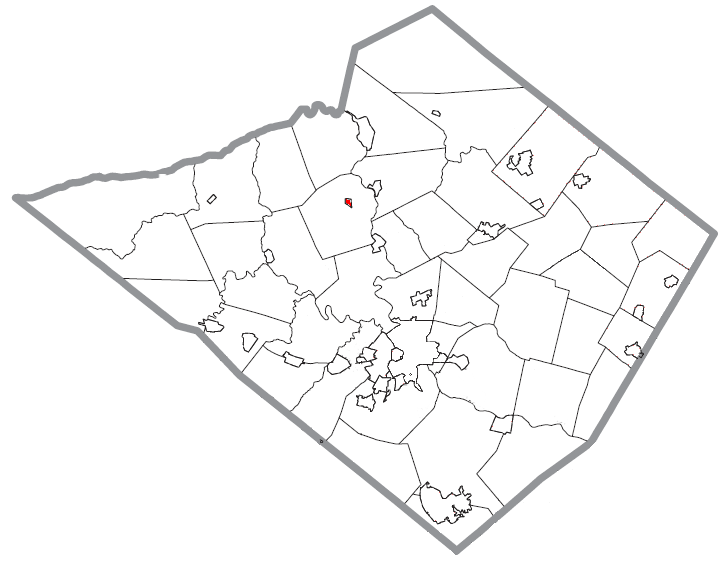
- Location of Centerport in Berks County, Pennsylvania

- Location of Centerport in Pennsylvania Centerport (the United States)
- Coordinates: 40°29′12″N 76°00′26″W
- Country: United States
- State: Pennsylvania
- County: Berks

Area
  - Total: 0.17 sq mi (0.45 km^{2})
  - Land: 0.17 sq mi (0.45 km^{2})
  - Water: 0 sq mi (0.00 km^{2})
- Elevation: 348 ft (106 m)

Population (2020)
  - Total: 314
  - Density: 1,804.7/sq mi (696.81/km^{2})
- Time zone: UTC-5 (EST)
  - Summer (DST): UTC-4 (EDT)
- ZIP Code: 19516
- Area codes: 610 and 484
- FIPS code: 42-12104
- Website: Centerport

Centerport is a borough in north central Berks County, Pennsylvania, United States. The population was 314 at the 2020 census. The borough is in the Schuylkill Valley School District.

== Geography ==
Centerport is located at 40°29′12″N 76°0′26″W (40.486726, -76.007190). According to the United States Census Bureau, the borough has a total area of 0.2 square miles (0.52 km^{2}), all land. It drains southeastward to the nearby Schuylkill River.

== Transportation ==
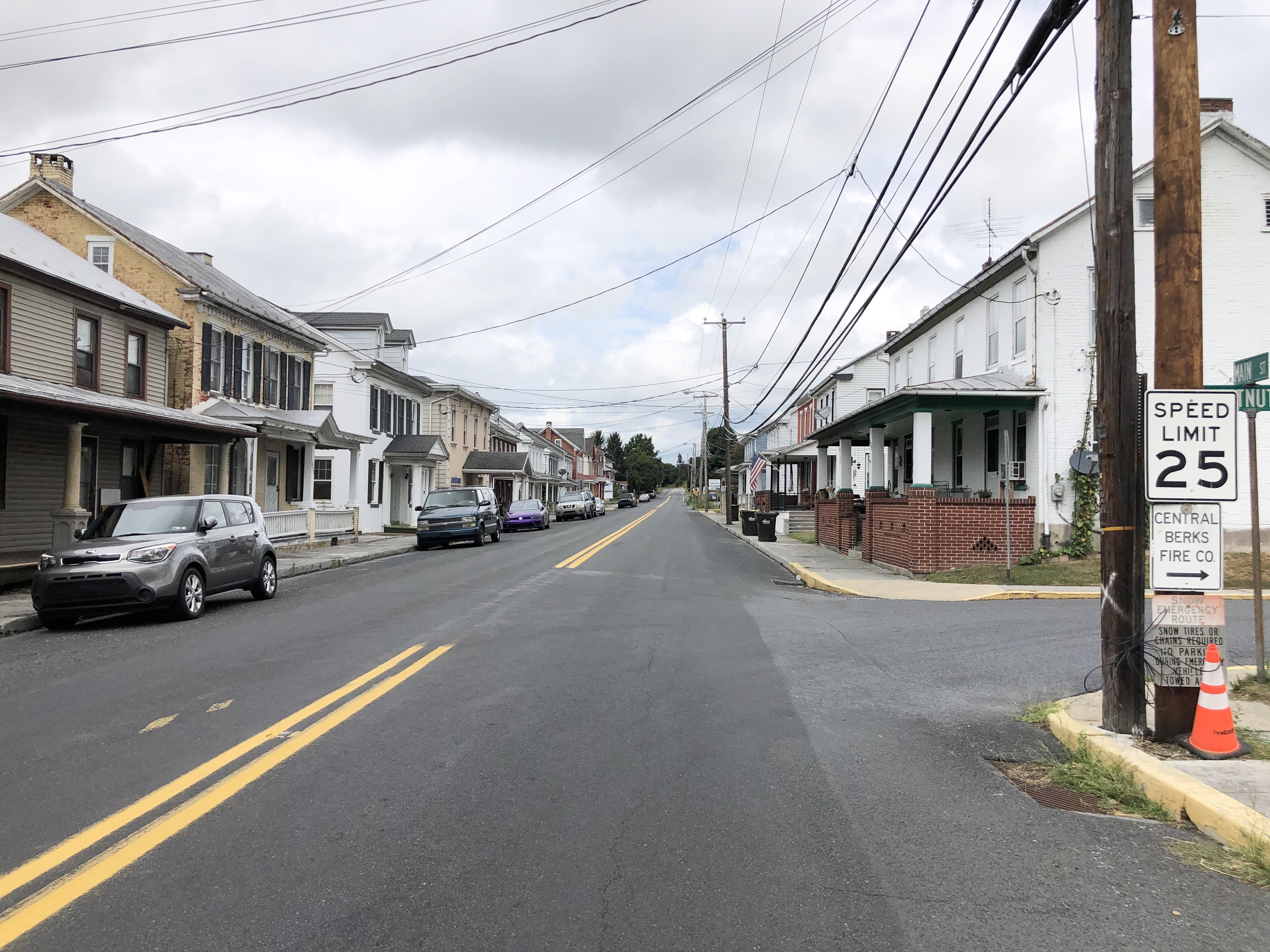
Main Street in Centerport

As of 2006, there were 2.02 miles (3.25 km) of public roads in Centerport, of which 1.12 miles (1.80 km) were maintained by the Pennsylvania Department of Transportation (PennDOT) and 0.90 miles (1.45 km) were maintained by the borough.

No numbered highways pass through Centerport. Main thoroughfares in the borough include Main Street, Centerport Road, Bernville/Irish Creek Road and Shartlesville Road. The nearest state highway is Pennsylvania Route 61, which passes two miles to the east.

== Demographics ==
Historical population
Census	Pop.	Note	%±
1890	133		—
1900	141		6.0%
1910	111		−21.3%
1920	134		20.7%
1930	137		2.2%
1940	191		39.4%
1950	226		18.3%
1960	208		−8.0%
1970	227		9.1%
1980	246		8.4%
1990	284		15.4%
2000	327		15.1%
2010	387		18.3%
2020	314		−18.9%

As of the 2000 census, there were 387 people, 149 households, and 107 families living in the borough. The population density was 1,935 inhabitants per square mile (747/km^{2}). There were 150 housing units at an average density of 750 per square mile (290/km^{2}). The racial makeup of the borough was 96.4% White, 0.5% African American, 0.5% Native American, and 2.6% from other races.. Hispanic or Latino of any race were 3.6% of the population.

There were 149 households, out of which 29.5% had children under the age of 18 living with them, 51.7% were married couples living together, 11.4% had a female householder with no husband present, and 28.2% were non-families. 21.5% of all households were made up of individuals, and 6.7% had someone living alone who was 65 years of age or older. The average household size was 2.60 and the average family size was 2.93.

In the borough, the population was spread out, with 24.0% under the age of 18, 9.6% from 18 to 24, 25.8% from 25 to 44, 24.6% from 45 to 64, and 16% who were 65 years of age or older. The median age was 37.9 years. Males made up 49.1% of the population and females made up 50.9%.

The median income for a household in the borough was $47,115, and the median income for a family was $51,250. Males had a median income of $30,938 versus $23,750 for females. The per capita income for the borough was $20,927. About 2.3% of families and 4.6% of the population were below the poverty line, including 3.3% of those under age 18 and 6.4% of those age 65 or over.

== Landmarks ==
Centerport is known for having a literal nine foot tall fork in the road at the intersection of Main Street and Centerport Road.

== Gallery ==
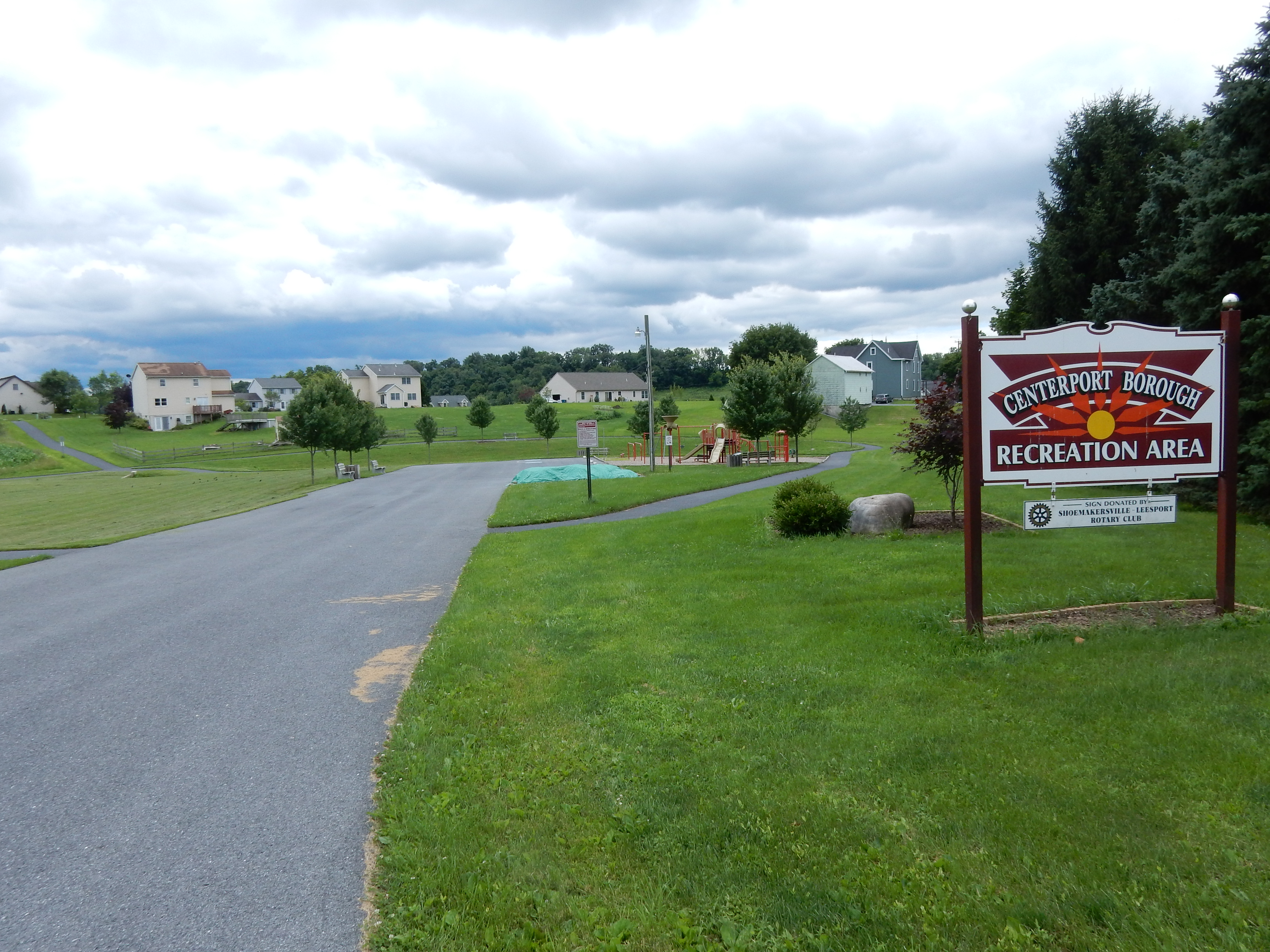
Recreation Area

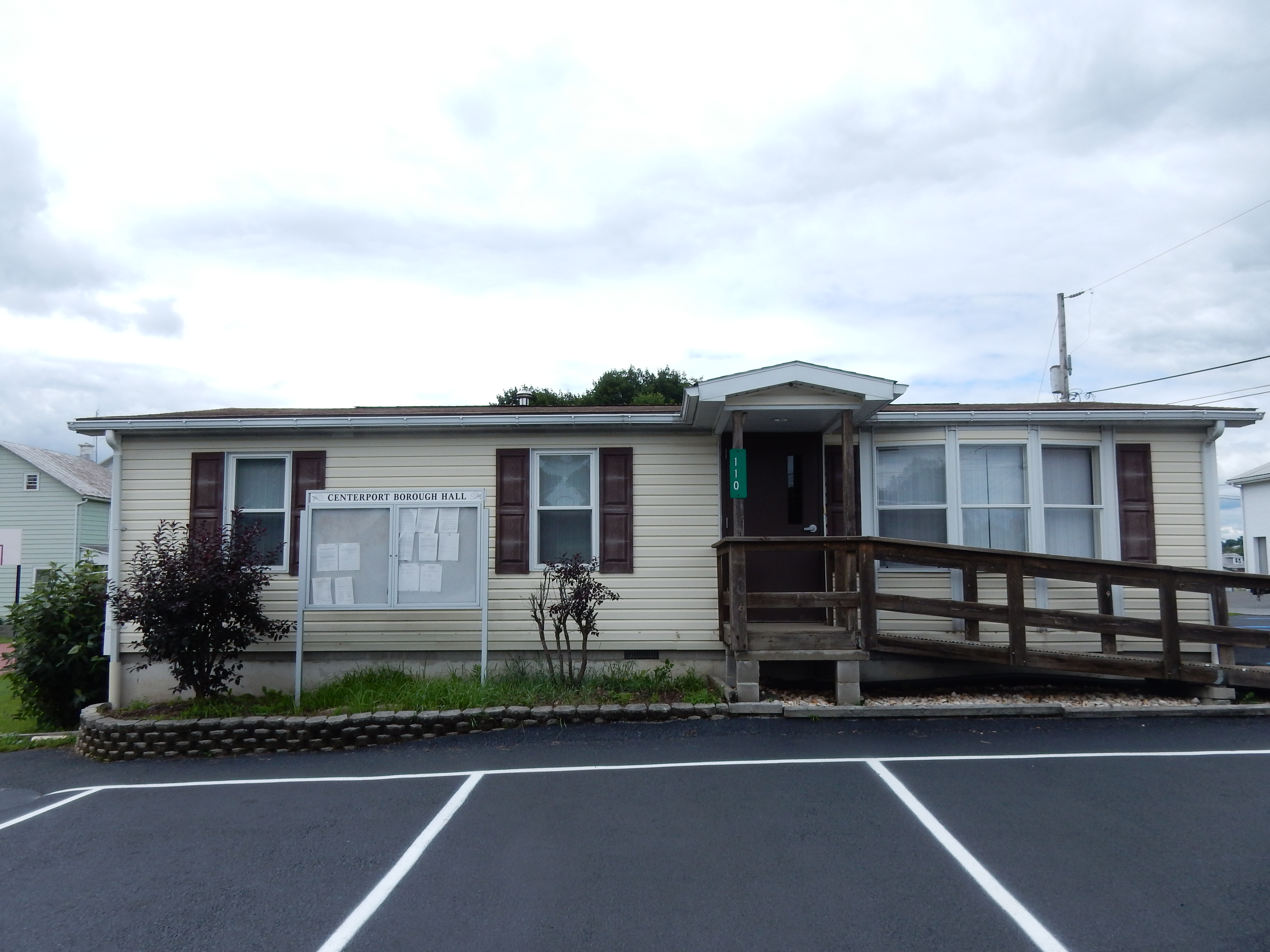
Centerport Borough Hall

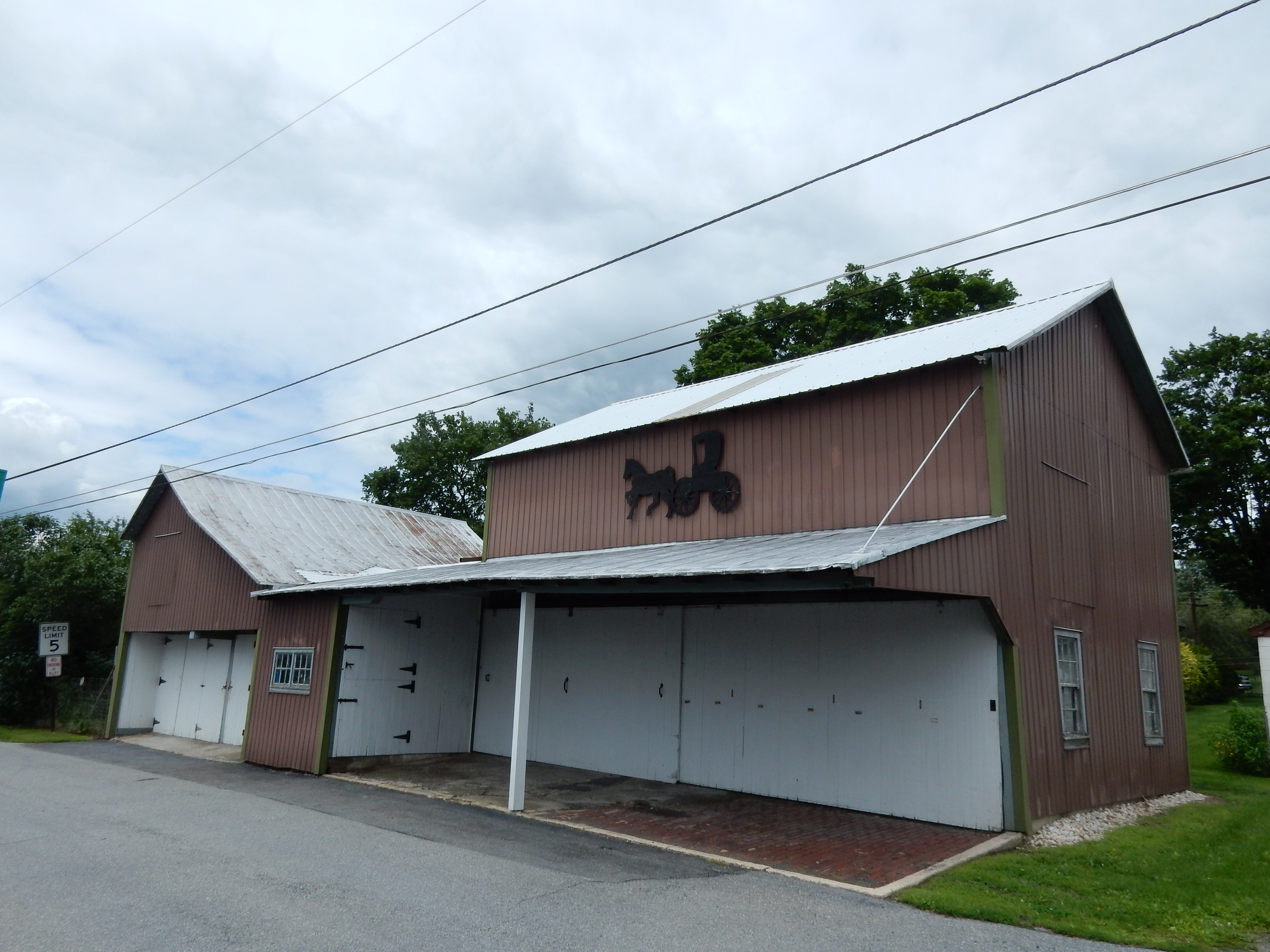
Borough Maintenance Bldg

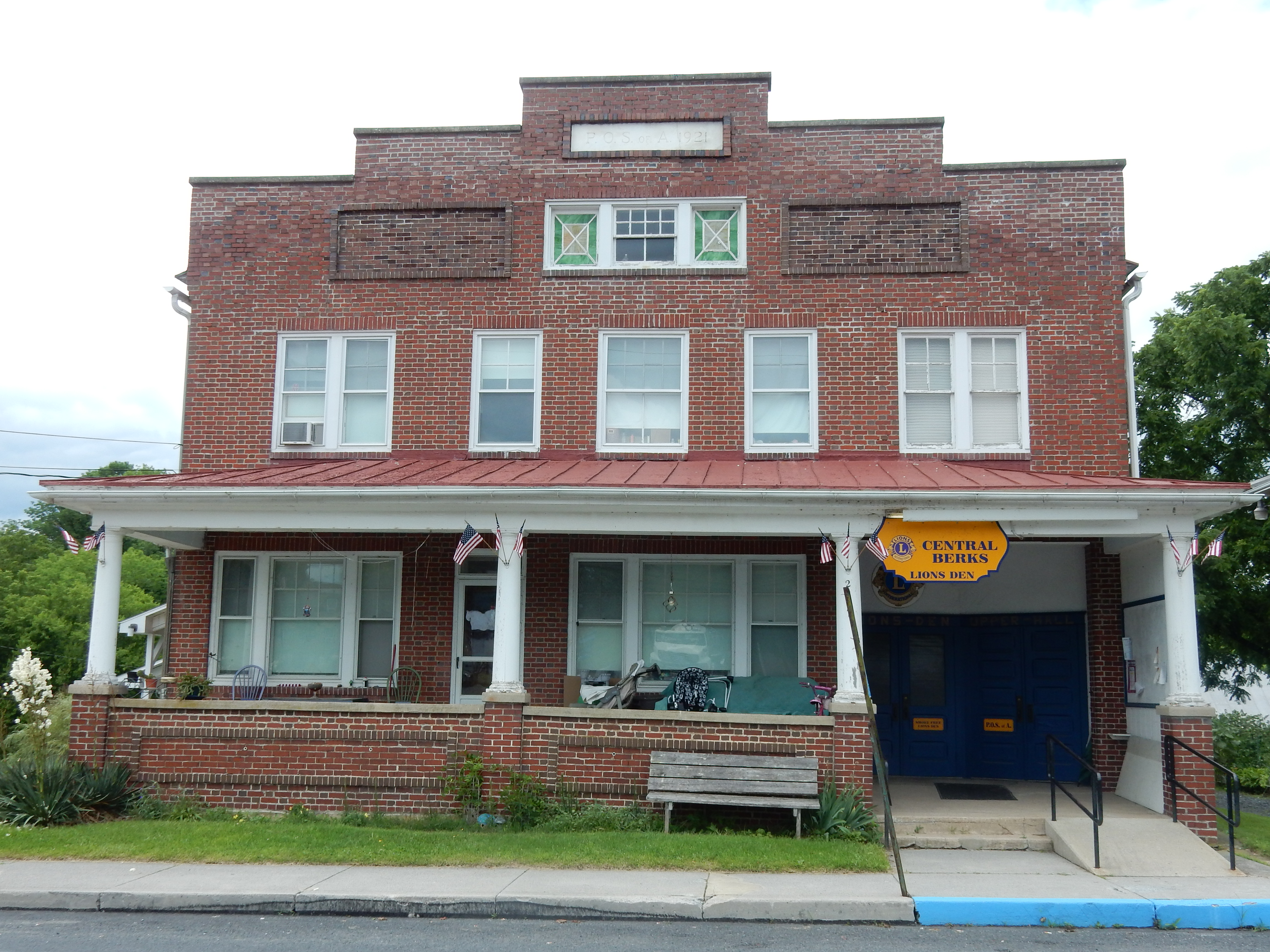
Central Berks Lions Club

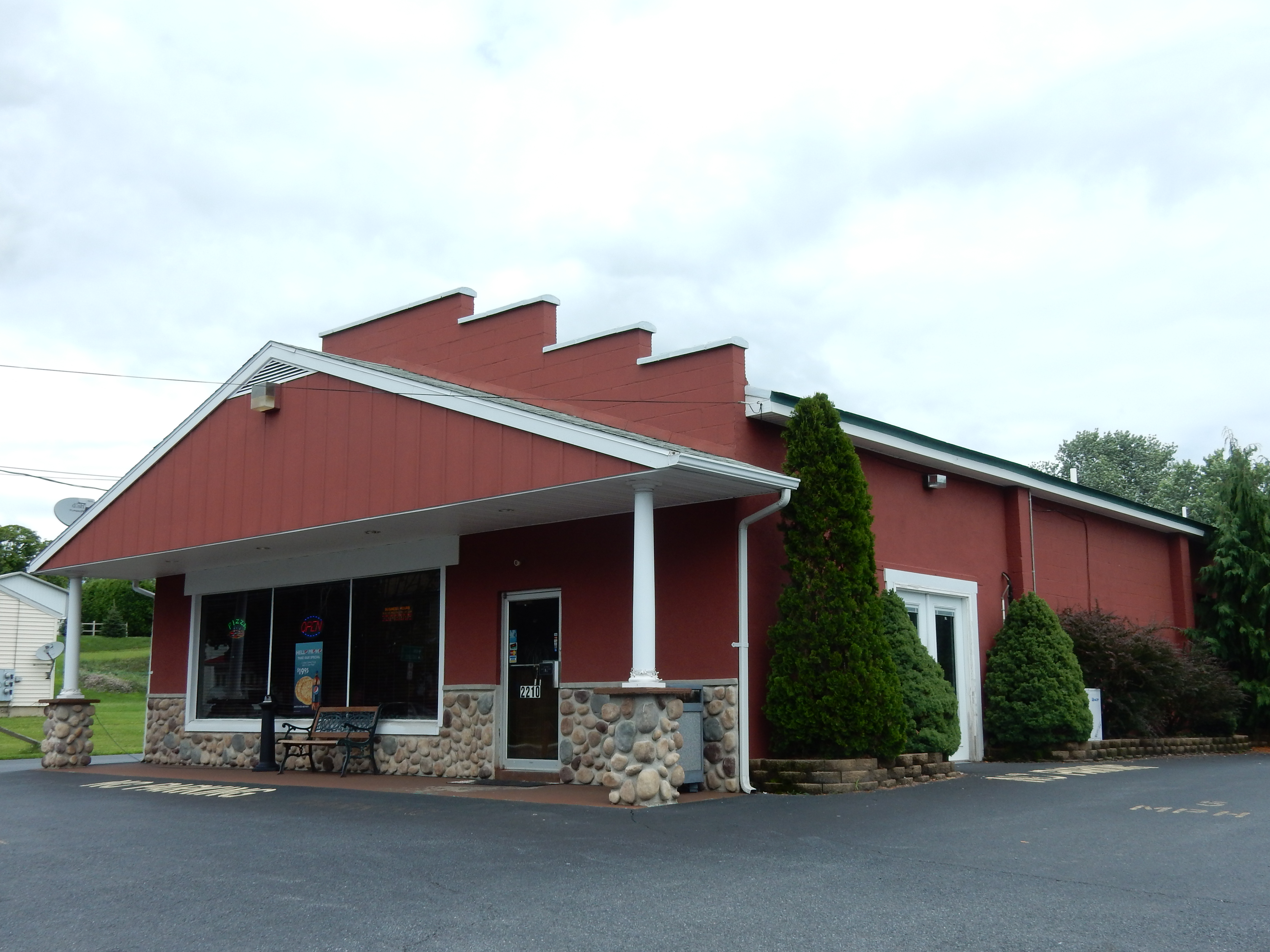
Amato's Pizza

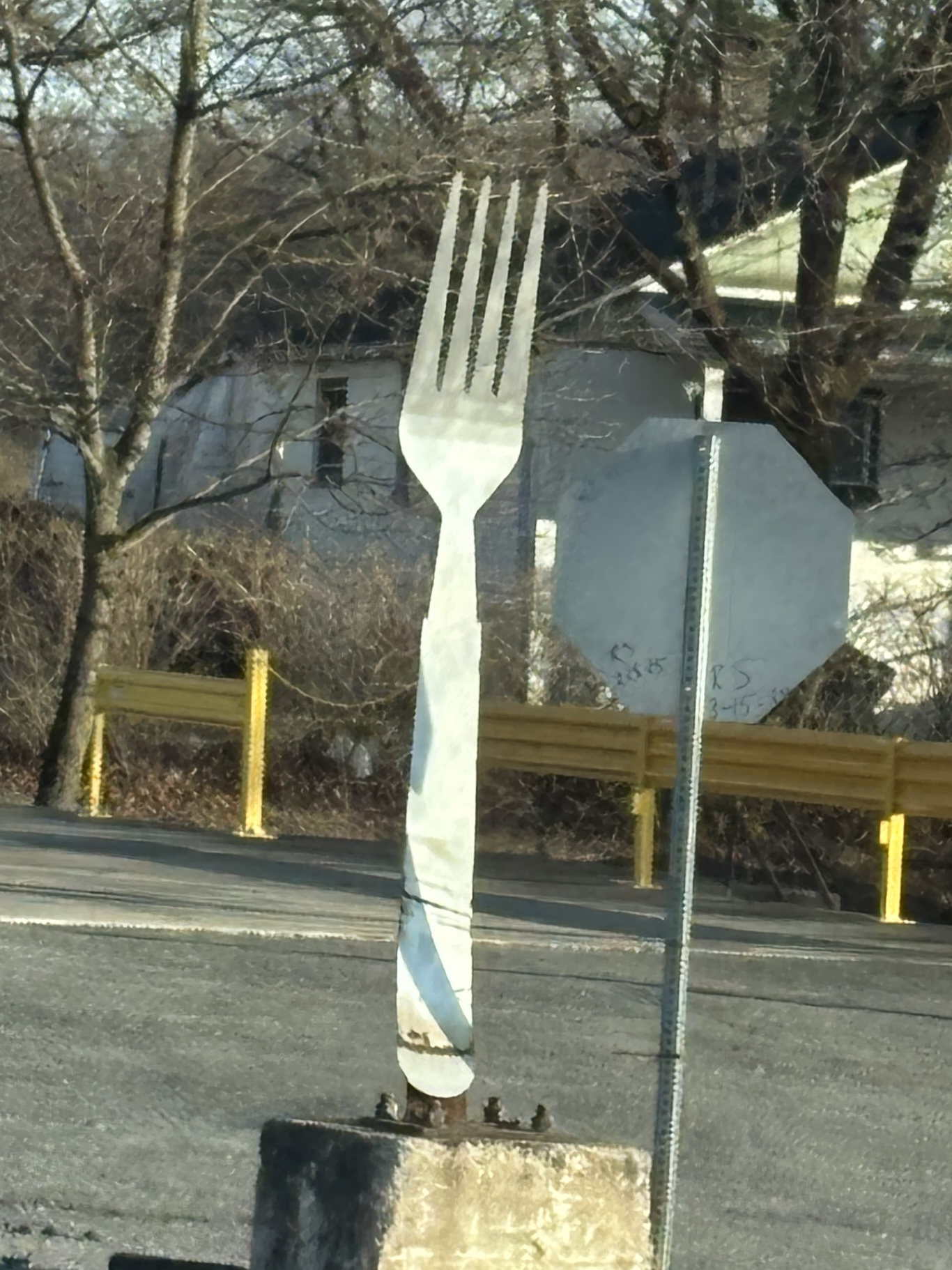
Literal “Fork in Road”
