= Bad Berleburg =

Place in North Rhine-Westphalia, Germany

- Town
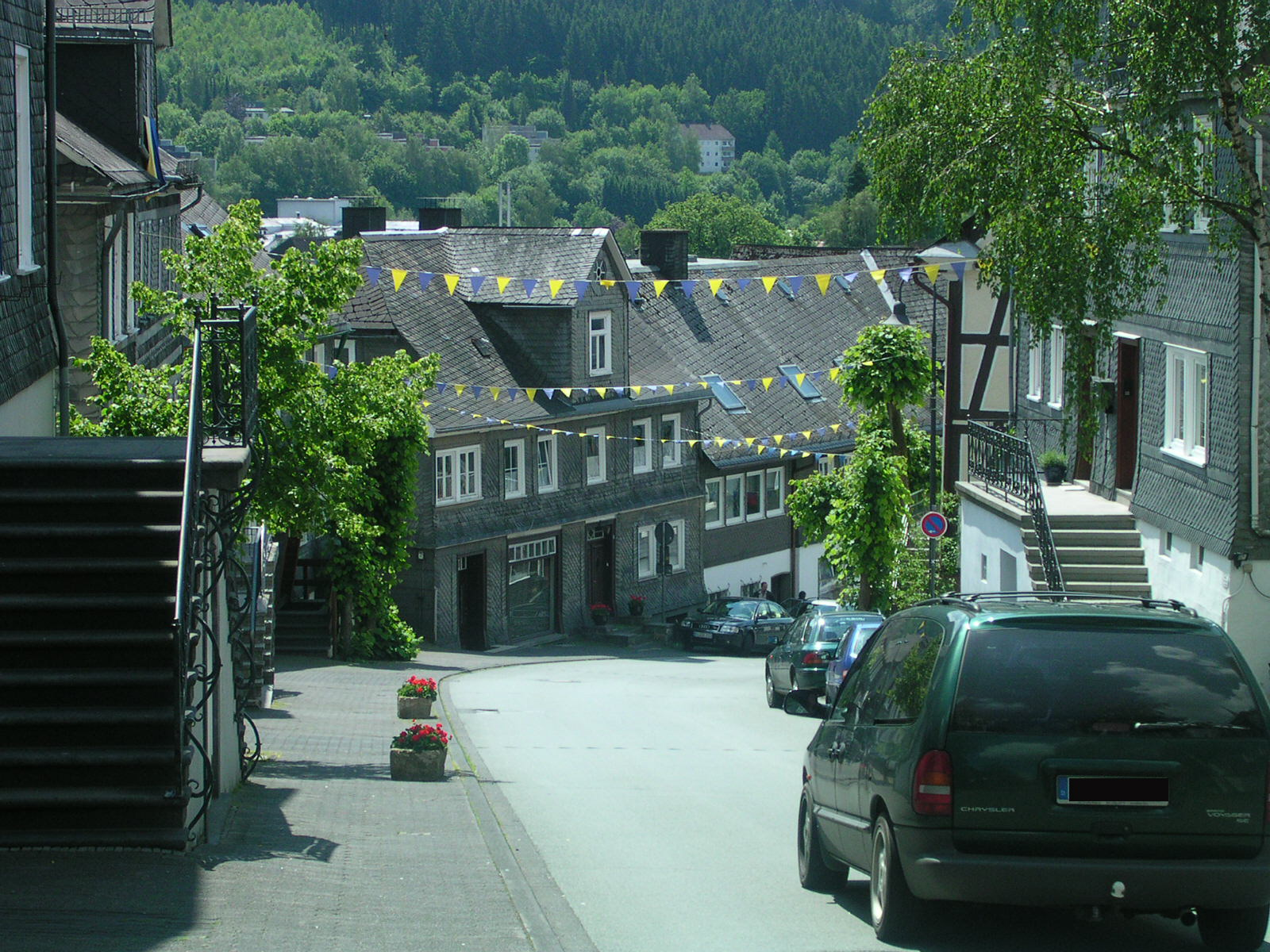

- Coat of arms

- Location of Bad Berleburg within Siegen-Wittgenstein district
- Interactive map of Bad Berleburg
- Location within Germany Location within North Rhine-Westphalia
- Coordinates: 51°02′59″N 08°24′00″E
- Country: Germany
- State: North Rhine-Westphalia
- Admin. region: Arnsberg
- District: Siegen-Wittgenstein
- Subdivisions: 23

Government
  - Mayor (2025–30): Volker Sonneborn (nonparty)

Area
  - Total: 275.52 km^{2} (106.38 sq mi)
- Elevation: 350–789 m (1,148–2,589 ft)

Population (2025-12-31)
  - Total: 18,251
  - Density: 66.242/km^{2} (171.57/sq mi)
- Time zone: UTC+01:00 (CET)
  - Summer (DST): UTC+02:00 (CEST)
- Postal codes: 57319
- Dialling codes: 02751, 02750, 02755, 02758, 02759
- Vehicle registration: SI, BLB
- Website: www.bad-berleburg.de

Bad Berleburg (German: [baːt ˈbɛʁləbʊʁk], earlier also Berleburg) is a town, in the district of Siegen-Wittgenstein, in North Rhine-Westphalia, Germany. It is one of Germany's largest towns by land area. It is located approximately 30 km (19 mi) northeast of Siegen and 35 km (22 mi) northwest of Marburg an der Lahn.

== Geography ==
=== Location ===
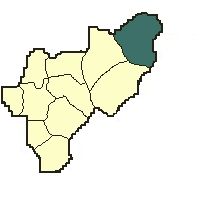
Bad Berleburg's location in Siegen-Wittgenstein

Bad Berleburg lies in the northeast of Siegen-Wittgenstein in the middle of the Rothaargebirge, a low mountain range. The western town limit is also the boundary with the neighbouring district of Olpe. The town is also bordered on the north by the Hochsauerland district. The town's eastern limit is likewise the boundary with the Bundesland of Hesse. The town of Bad Laasphe borders on Bad Berleburg in the south, and the community of Erndtebrück in the southwest.

The small river Odeborn flows through Berleburg and empties into the Eder further south.

=== Constituent communities ===
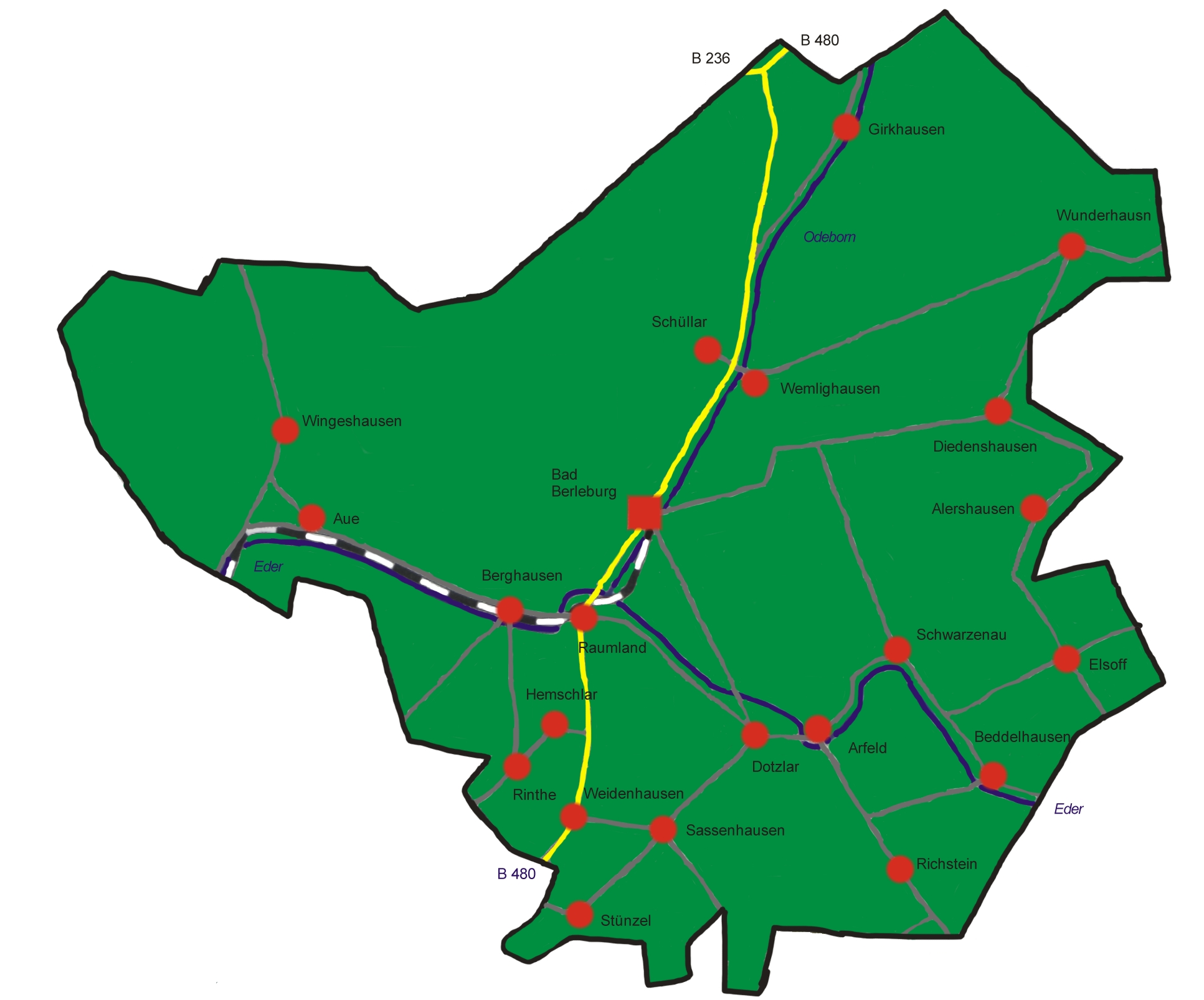
Constituent communities

Since 1975, the following villages have been part of Bad Berleburg:

Alertshausen; Arfeld; Aue; Beddelhausen; Berghausen; Christianseck; Diedenshausen; Dotzlar; Elsoff; Girkhausen; Hemschlar	Raumland; Richstein; Rinthe; Sassenhausen; Schüllar; Schwarzenau; Stünzel; Weidenhausen; Wemlighausen; Wingeshausen; Wunderthausen

=== Population ===
Historical population

Year	Pop.	±% p.a.
1965	20,363	—
1970	20,828	+0.45%
1975	20,414	−0.40%
1980	20,198	−0.21%
1985	19,767	−0.43%
1990	20,471	+0.70%
1995	21,289	+0.79%

Year	Pop.	±% p.a.
2000	21,219	−0.07%
2005	20,593	−0.60%
2010	19,814	−0.77%
2015	19,774	−0.04%
2020	18,847	−0.96%
2025	18,251	−0.64%

Source: Landesdatabank Nordrhein-Westfalen

== History ==
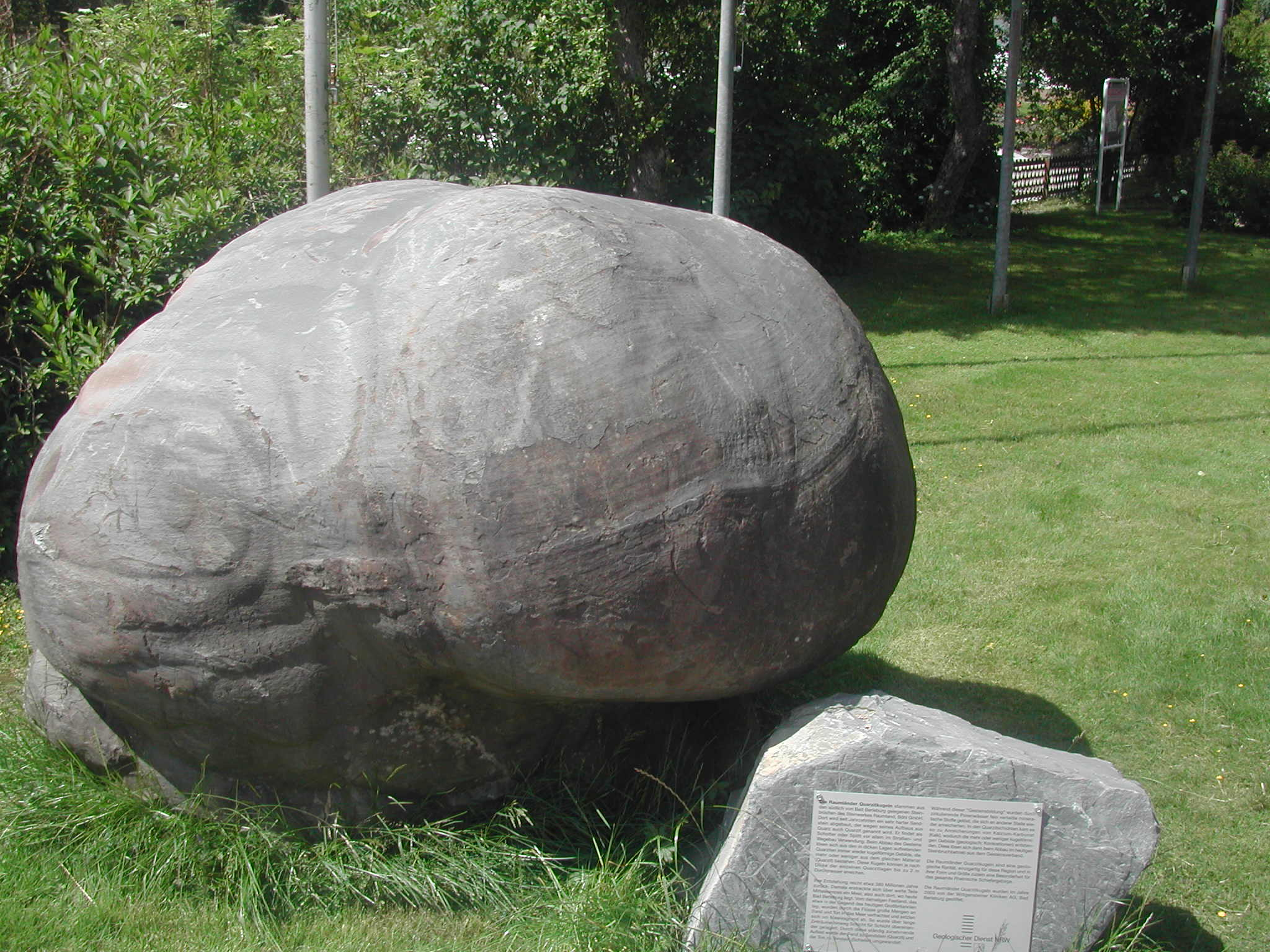

Archaeological finds confirm that the area covered by today's municipal area was settled as far back as the 7th century BC. On the castle hills at Aue, Dotzlar and Wemlighausen are traces of circular forts from this time. There is, however, no evidence of settlement in the area for the time that follows, up to the 8th century.

The constituent communities of Arfeld and Raumland were mentioned in documents in 800 and 802 respectively. There are also documents from 1059 confirming the existence of Alertshausen, Beddelhausen, Elsoff and Schwarzenau. In 1174, the name "Widechinstein" was mentioned for the first time. The village of Berleburg is mentioned for the first time in 1258 in documents from the Grafschaft Abbey (in this instance Grafschaft is a location rather than the German word for "county"), under the name Berneborg. The castle passed on 30 March 1258 to Count Siegfried I and the "monastery reeve" ("Klostervogt") Adolf von Grafschaft. In 1322, this double overlordship in Berleburg was ended by Widekind von Grafschaft when he forwent his rights to the town in Siegfried II's favour. Siegfried was the last of his noble line, and when he died, the inheritance went to his son-in-law, Salentin von Sayn. He founded the House of Sayn-Wittgenstein.

In 1488, and again in 1522, great fires roared through the town.

Until Count Ludwig the Elder's death in 1605, Berleburg was developing itself into a capital and residence town of the County of Sayn-Wittgenstein-Berleburg, which in the 18th century was a centre in Germany for the Inspiration Movement, which had grown out of radical pietism. Between 1726 and 1742, the well known Berleburg Bible was printed here. Christoph Sauer (1695–1758) lived in nearby Laasphe for a few years before emigrating to Pennsylvania in 1724. There in 1743 he would print the first German-language Bible in North America with a press and Fraktur type that may come from Berleburg, but this is uncertain. The American "Church of the Brethren" was founded by Alexander Maack who also lived a few years in the village of Schwarzenau. Tolerance of religious dissenters ebbed after the death of Count Casimir in 1741.

Wittgenstein was placed under the Grand Duchy of Hesse-Darmstadt in 1806. Under the terms of the Congress of Vienna, it was then ceded to the Prussian province of Westphalia in 1816.

When the Rothaarbahn railway was built to Berleburg in 1911, it brought with it the onset of industrialization, although it was limited to forest products at first. Other forms of industry did not come to town until after the Second World War.

The town was already acknowledged as a climatic spa in 1935 for its gentle and agreeably mild climate. After 1949, the Klinik Wittgenstein was built as a psychosomatic hospital.

In 1951, on private initiative, a Kneipp spa association was founded, which was the forerunner to the Wittgenstein spa institution (Wittgensteiner Kuranstalt; WKA). In the first year that the WKA Kneipp spa works were open, there were 11,000 overnight stays. Little by little, Berleburg became Germany's second largest Kneipp spa.

In 1971, once the town had been granted state recognition as a Kneipp spa, Berleburg was entitled to use the prefix Bad (lit. "bath") with its name, thereby becoming the town of Bad Berleburg, as it has been known ever since. In 1974 also came recognition as a curative spa.

In 1975, with the Sauerland-Paderborn Law, dealing with municipal reform, the surrounding Amt of Berleburg was abolished, and a great deal of it then became part of the town of Bad Berleburg, making the town North Rhine-Westphalia's second largest by land area. The communities of Hoheleye, Langewiese, Mollseifen and Neuastenberg were assigned to the newly established Hochsauerland district. They are today constituent communities of Winterberg. The communities of Balde, Birkelbach, Birkefehl, Leimstruth and Womelsdorf were transferred to the community of Erndtebrück. At the same time, the old district of Wittgenstein was dissolved and added to Siegen district.

In 1984, this district's name was changed to Siegen-Wittgenstein, as it is still called now.

== Politics ==
=== Town council ===
The town council's 32 seats as of September 2025 were distributed as follows:

	CDU	SPD	Greens	FDP	UWG	AfD	[No Affiliation]	total
2025	18	7	2	–	–	5	–	32

Note: UWG is a citizens' coalition.

=== Coat of arms ===
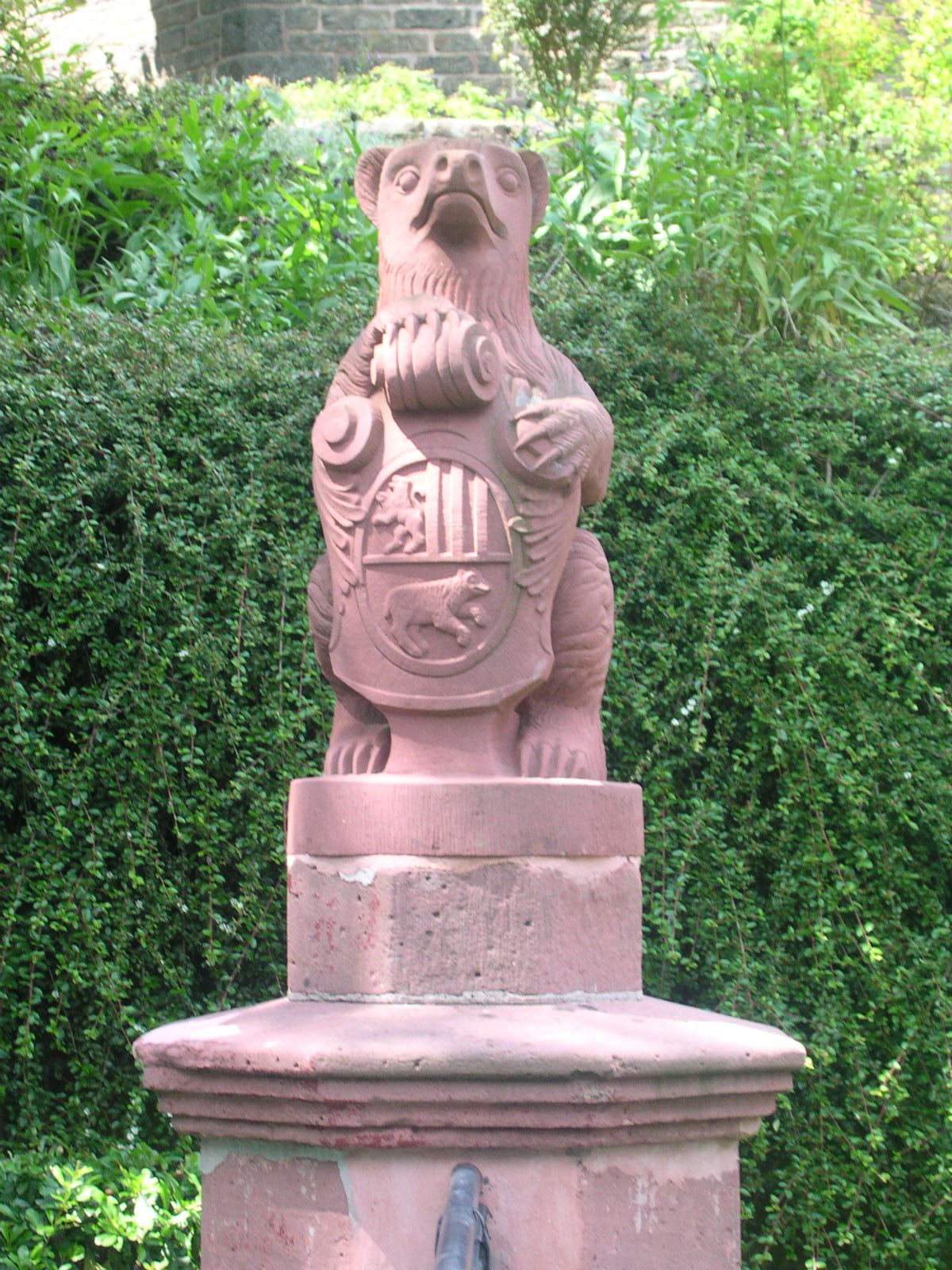

The lion rampant is the mark of the House of Sayn, and the bear stands for the hunt. Some sources, on the other hand, say that it is a canting symbol ("Bear" is Bär in German, pronounced the same way as the first syllable of Berleburg). The House of Wittgenstein is also represented by the pallets (vertical stripes) from their old arms.

== Culture and sightseeing ==
=== Buildings ===

- Courtyard of Schloss Wittgenstein – Tours are available to the public at differing times depending on the season for €5, in German only.

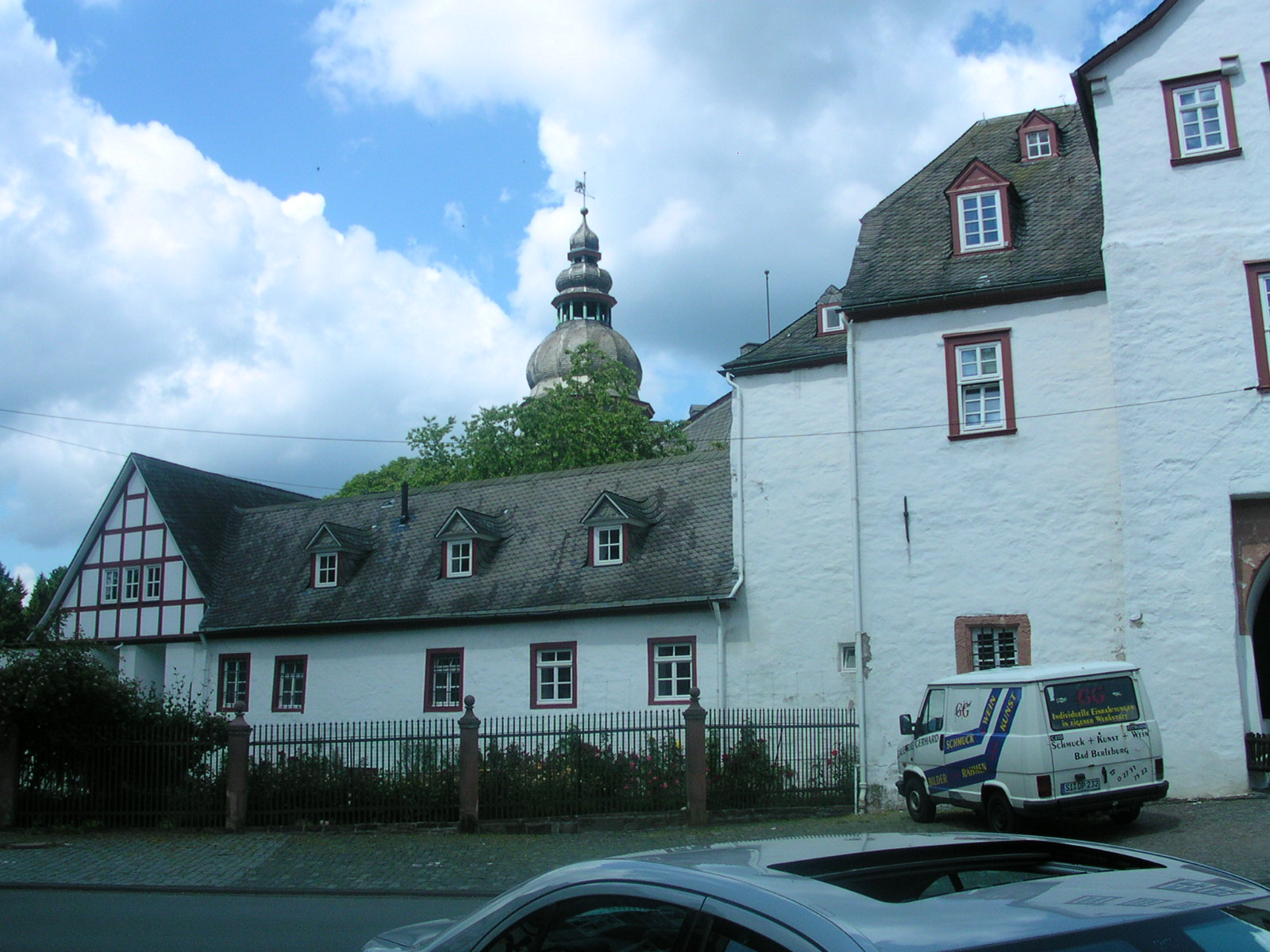

- Schloss Wittgenstein – a Baroque stately home from 1733 with a museum about the princely house of Sayn-Wittgenstein-Berleburg
- Schulkapelle Sassenhausen (school chapel) – this half-timbered structure was built in 1703 as a church by Mannus Riedesel but was later adapted to house a school as well.
- Ludwigsburg – built for a side branch of the Sayn-Wittgensteins, it is richly embellished on the cornices and corner beams. Also the work of Mannus Riedesel.

=== Regular events ===
- Wollmarkt (wool market) – first Sunday in May
- Stünzelfest, menagerie and fair – second Saturday in June
- Berleburger Schützenfest (marksmanship festival) – first weekend in July
- Schützenfest des Schieß- und Schützenverein Wingeshausen 1928 e.V. (marksmanship festival) – fourth weekend in July
- Schützenfest in Müsse des Schieß- und Schützenverein Müsse 1925 e.V. (marksmanship festival) – second weekend in August

== Economy and infrastructure ==
=== Transport ===
The municipal area is crossed from north to south by Federal Highway (Bundesstraße) 480, joining Bad Berleburg with Winterberg in the north and Erndtebrück in the south.

The Rothaarbahn railway reaches the town from the south, ending there. Until 31 May 1981 there was a connection from Bad Berleburg to Allendorf and Frankenberg by the Upper Edertalbahn and the Ruhr-Eder-Bahn.

Bad Berleburg is located in the area of the fare association Westfalen-Tarif.

== Notable people ==
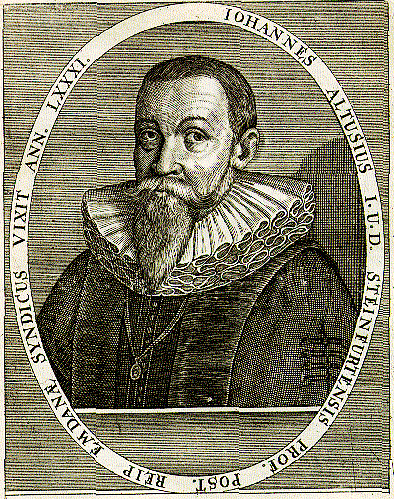
Johannes Althusius

- Johannes Althusius (1563–1638), legal scholar and politician from Bad Berleburg-Diedenshausen
- Paul Breuer (born 1950), Member of the Bundestag 1980-2003, since 2003 Landrat of the Siegen-Wittgenstein district
- Gerhard Dickel (1938–2003), Church Music Director, cantor, organist and music professor in Hamburg
- Norbert Dickel (born 1961), football player, stadium announcer for Borussia Dortmund
- Maik Eckhardt (born 1970), marksman
- Johann Friedrich Henschel (born 1931), born in Bad Berleburg-Schwarzenau, until 1995 vice-president of the Federal Constitutional Court of Germany
- Lewis Keseberg (1814–1895), emigrated to USA in 1844, famed member of the Donner Party and last member of the Party to be rescued
- Alexander Mack, Anabaptist theologian and founder of the Schwarzenau Brethren
- Jacob Nolde (1859–1916), attained great wealth in the United States in the hosiery industry and was an environmentalist largely responsible for the creation of Nolde Forest Environmental Education Center in Pennsylvania
- Hans-Werner Schwarz (born 1946), politician (FDP)
- Princess Nathalie of Sayn-Wittgenstein-Berleburg (born 1975), in Copenhagen, dressage rider
- Tim Treude (born 1990), football player
- Pia Wunderlich (born 1975), football player (since 1993 1. FFC Frankfurt)
- Tina Wunderlich (born 1977), football player (since 1994 1. FFC Frankfurt)
- Christina Zerbe (born 1980), former football national player

== Gallery ==
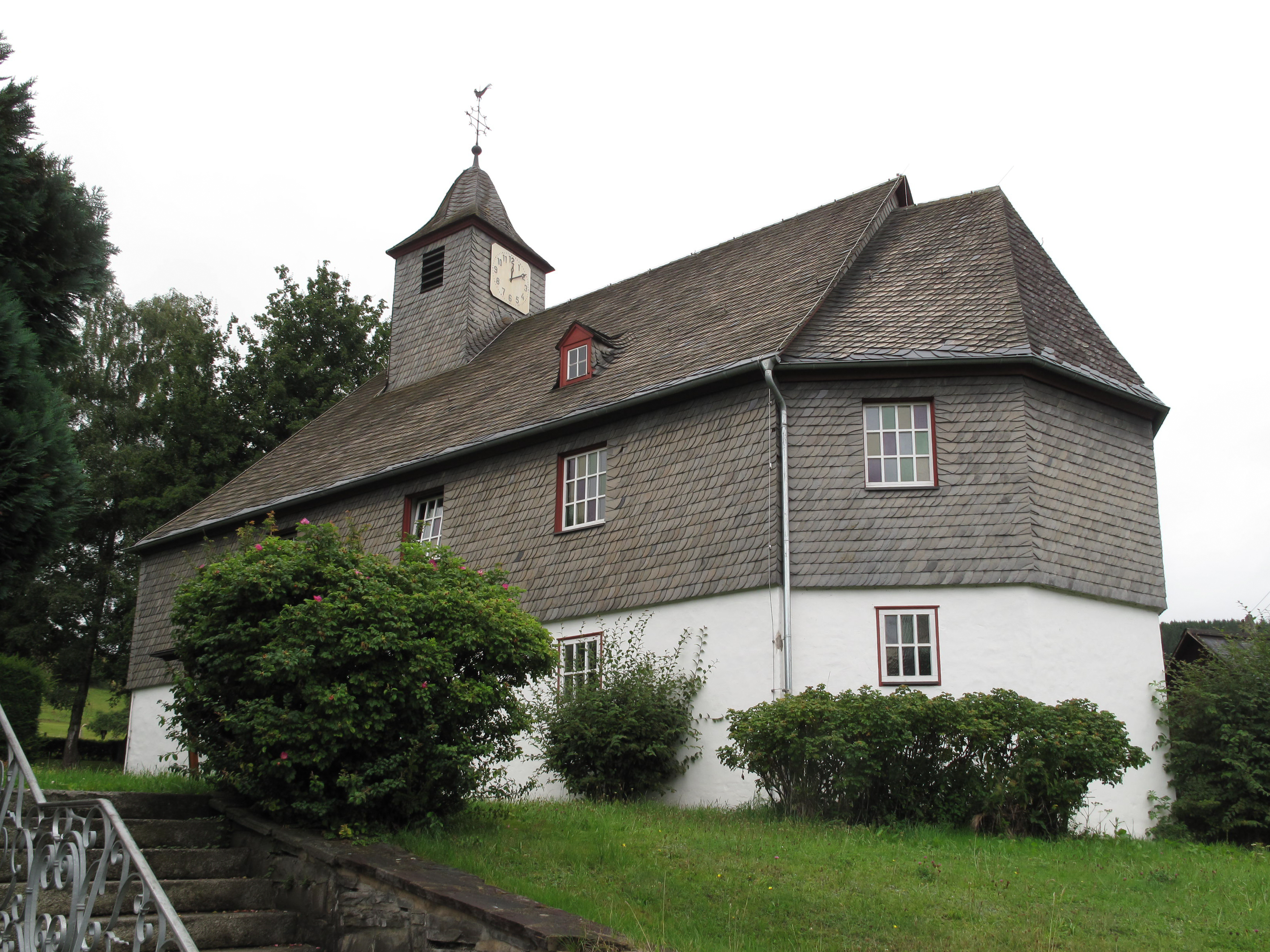
Wunderthausen, chapel

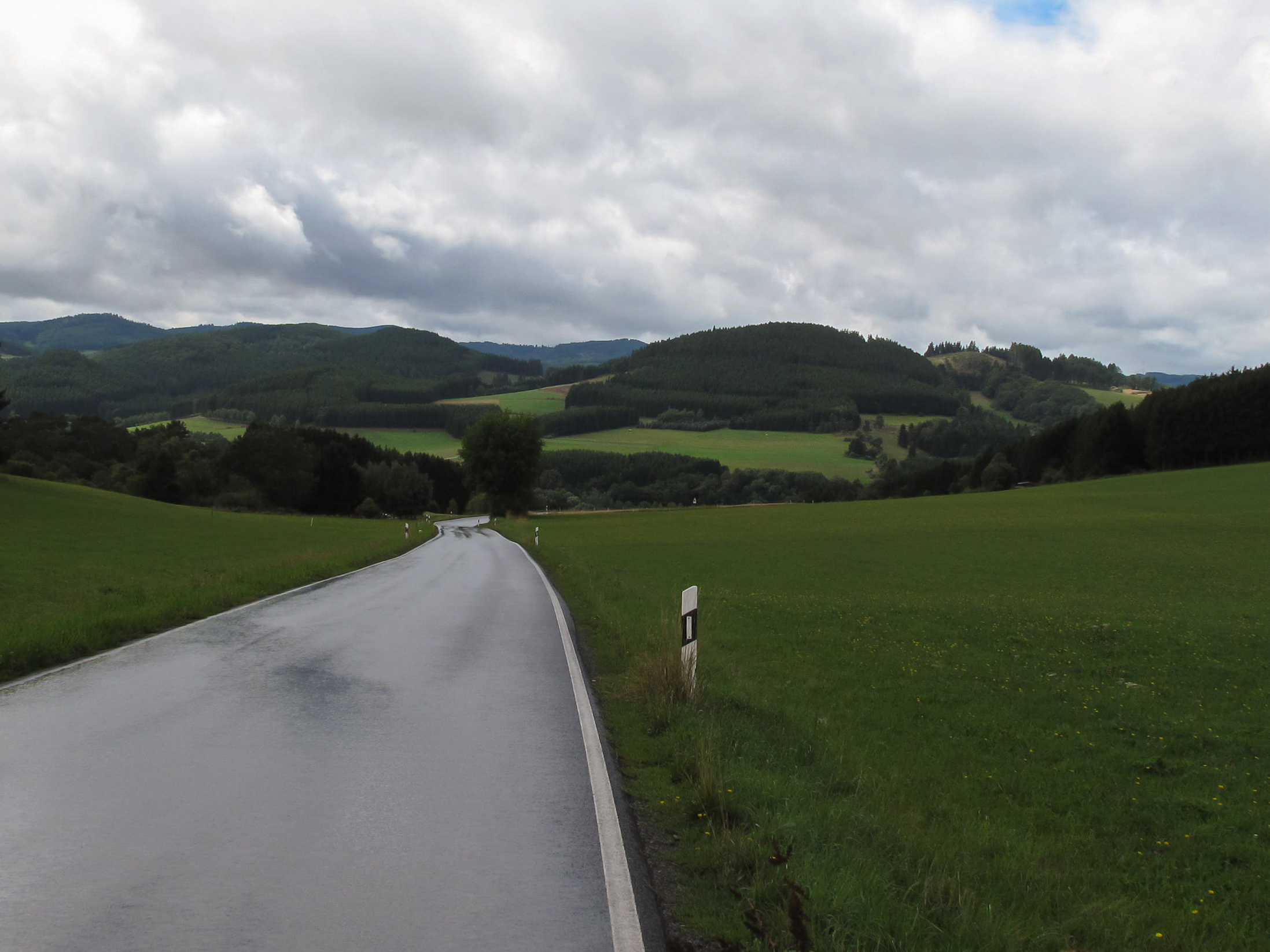
between Elsoff and Schwarzenau, street-panorama

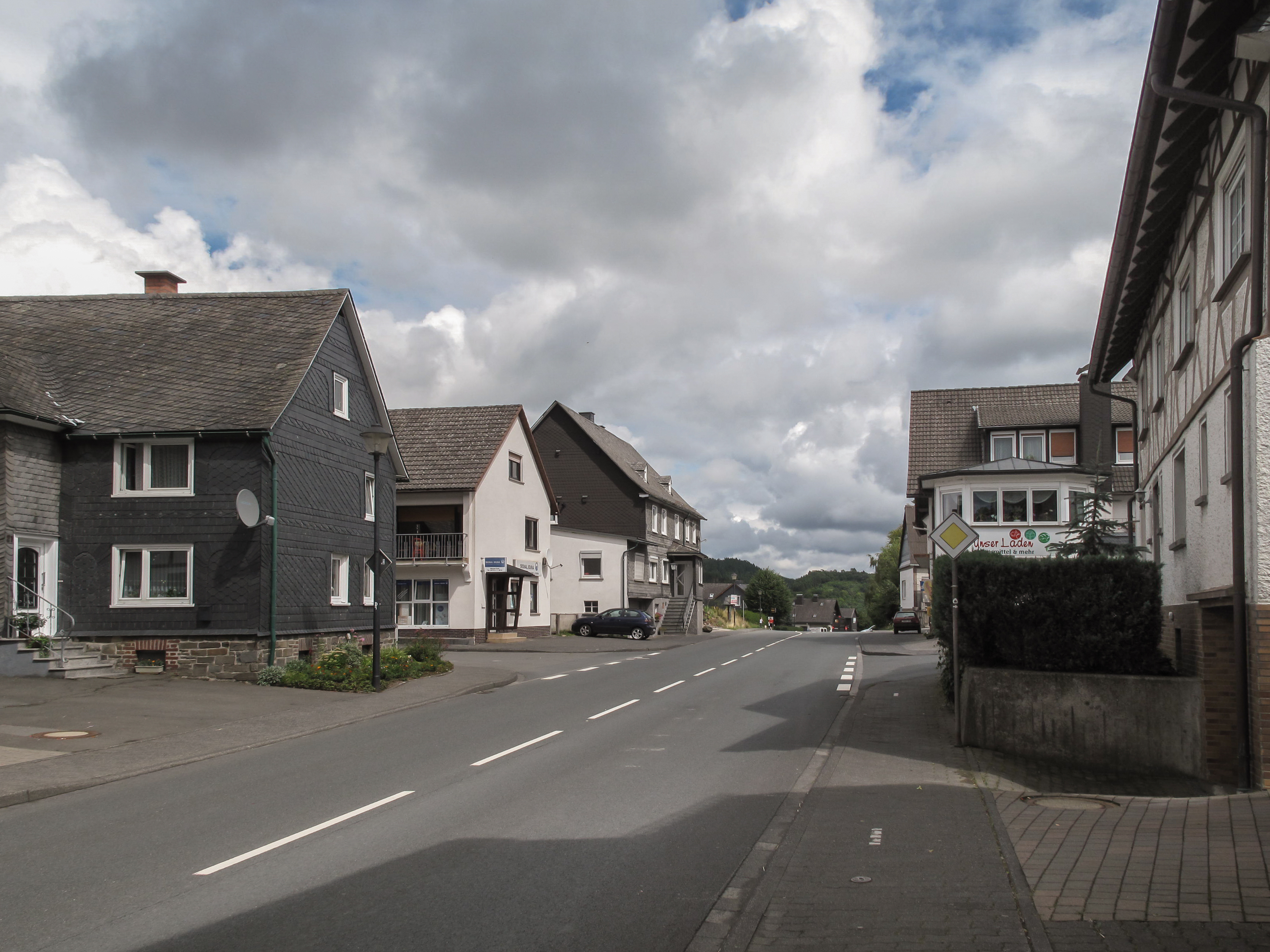
Dotzlar, view to a street

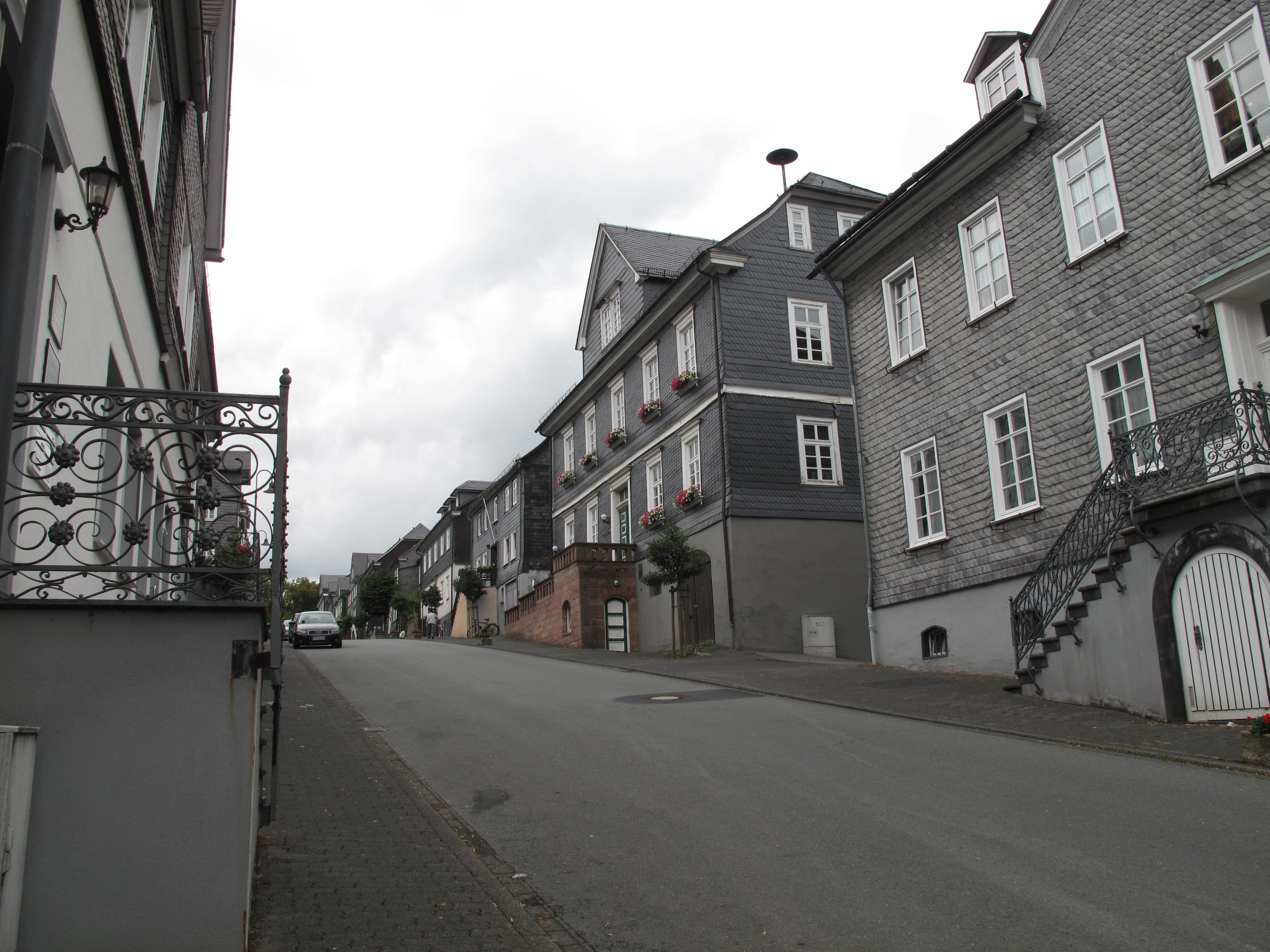
Bad Berleburg, view to a street

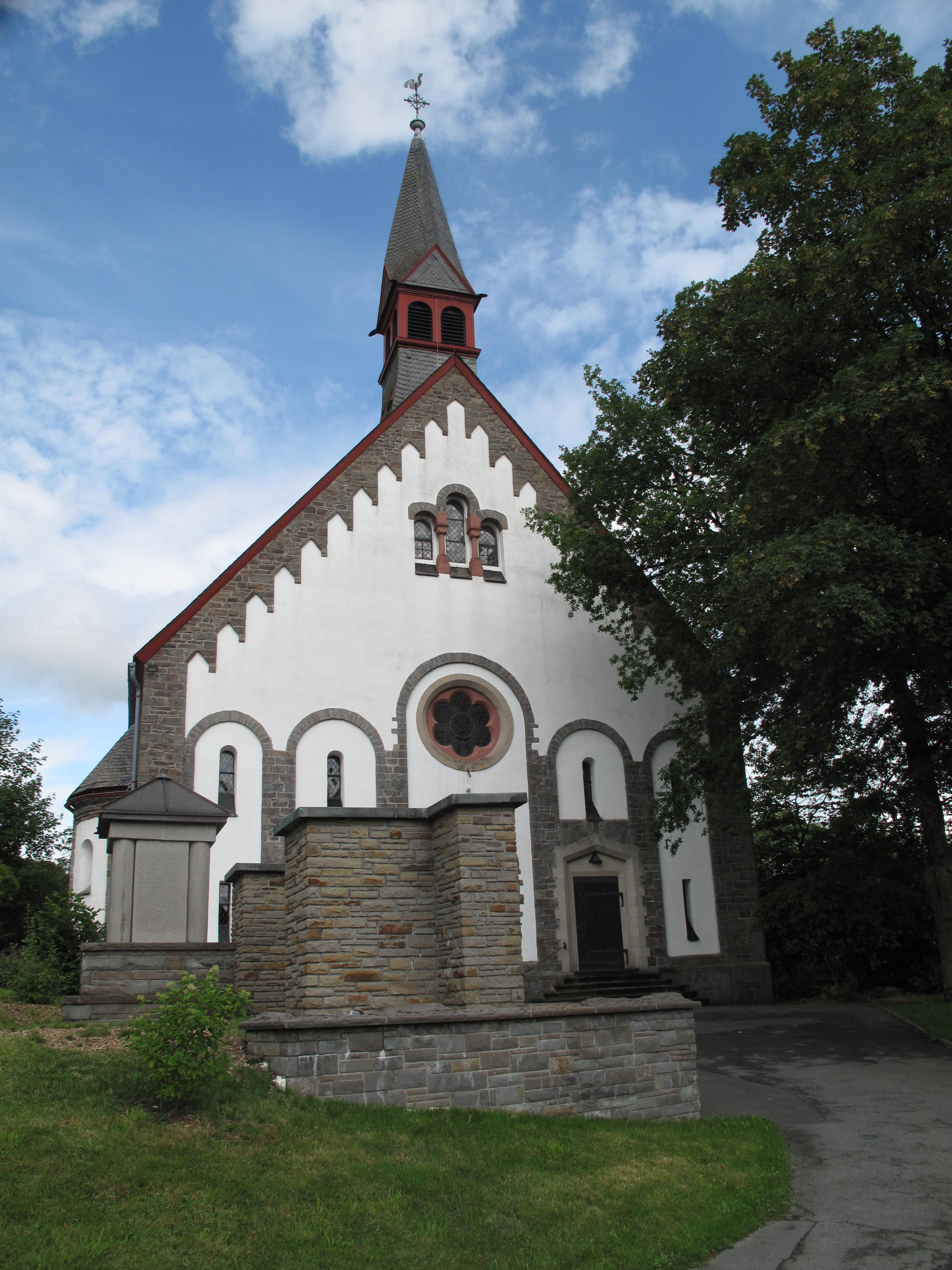
Wemlighausen, chapel

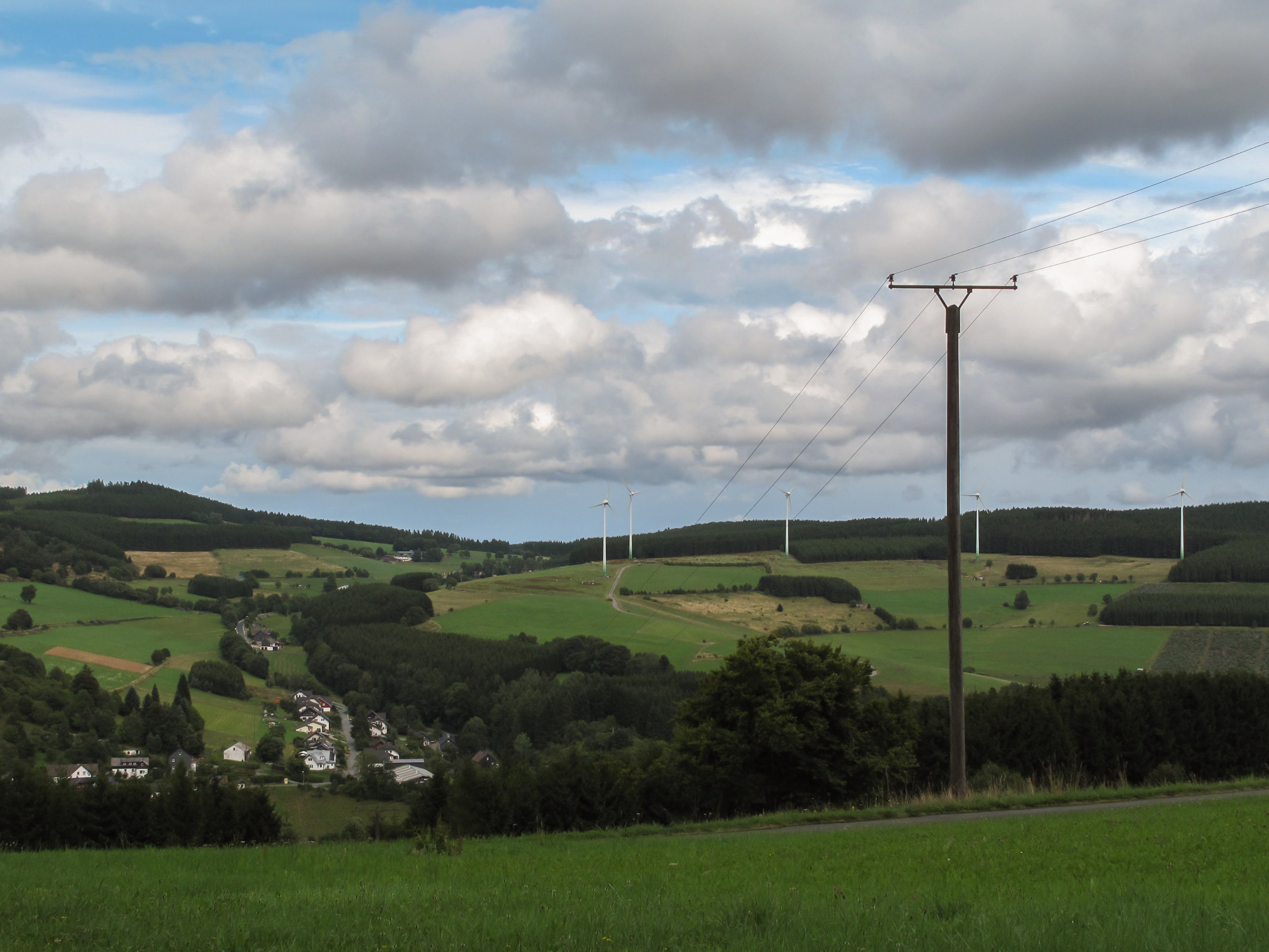
near Landebach, panorama
