= Werner Schwarz =

Werner Schwarz may refer to:

- Werner Schwarz (footballer)
- Werner Schwarz (politician)

== See also ==
- Hans-Werner Schwarz, German politician
