= Ulrich Bräker =

Swiss autodidact and writer (1735-1798)

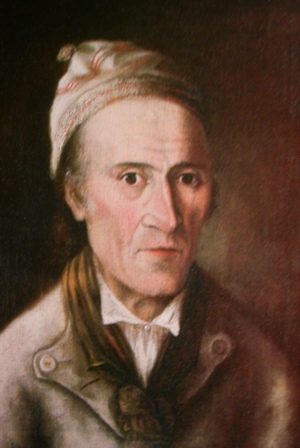
Ulrich Bräker (ca. 1793)

Ulrich Bräker (22 December 1735 – 11 September 1798) was a Swiss autodidact, writer and diarist, known for his autobiography, published in 1789, widely received at the time as the voice of an unspoiled "natural man" of the lower classes, based on the title of which Bräker became known as "The Poor Man of Toggenburg" (Der arme Mann im Toggenburg).

== Biography ==
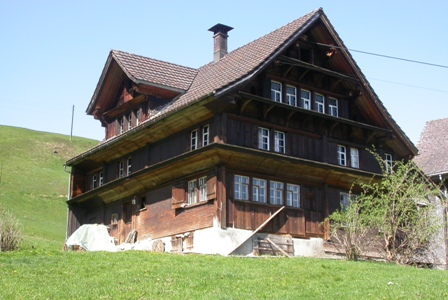
Bräker's birth house in Näppis (47.271°N 9.097°E) near Wattwil (2007 photograph).

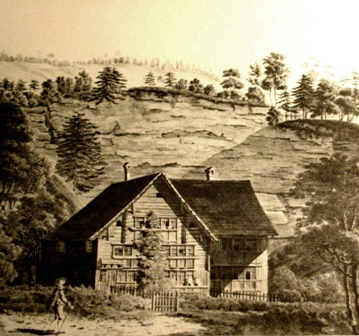
Bräker's house auf der Hochsteig (47.311°N 9.074°E), contemporary drawing (c. 1794; the house was destroyed in 1836)

Bräker was born on 22 December 1735 as the oldest of eight siblings in Scheftenau, Wattwil, Toggenburg (at the time a territory owned by the Abbey of St. Gall). After the estate name of his birth house, he was also known as Näppis-Ueli (Näbisuli). He was the son of Johannes Bräker (Näbishans, 1708–1762), a day laborer, small farmer and saltpeter boiler. During 1741–54, the family worked the remote estate of Dreyschlatt. Bräker was educated in literacy and basic arithmetics during ten weeks each winter, working as a goatherd for the rest of the year. In 1754, the family moved to Wattwil, where Bräker worked various jobs. In 1755, he was enlisted as a mercenary by a Prussian recruiting officer. Against his will, he was pressed into military service in the 13th infantry regiment of the Prussian Army in 1756, but managed to desert later in the same year at the Battle of Lobositz, at the beginning of the Seven Years' War.

Returning to his native Toggenburg, he married Salome Ambühl of Wattwil (1735–1822) in 1761 and had several children. He built a house auf der Hochsteig outside of Wattwil and traded in cotton for the local home industry. He began writing a diary, and his writing talent was discovered by local writer and intellectual Johann Ludwig Ambühl. Bräker published some texts in Ambühl's journal Brieftasche aus den Alpen. His writing is based on a pietistic outlook and reflects intimate familiarity with the Bible (based on a close reading of the eight volumes of the Berleburg Bible) as well as a keen observation of nature, besides an enthusiastic interest in the works of William Shakespeare (which became available in German translation at the time). Bräker wrote a commentary on each of the 36 plays by Shakespeare, published in 1780.

In the judgement of Voellmy (1955), Bräker's diary is a "touching human document" containing Lebensweisheit, or "pearls of true pragmatic wisdom", besides representing an important historical document of Bräker's time from the point of view of a man of the lower classes. His account of his half-year's service contributed significantly to the public image of the Prussian Army and its recruitment practices during the Seven Years' War.

In 1776, Bräker became a member of the Toggenburgische Moralische Gesellschaft, which was otherwise reserved to the educated classes. Publication of his diary began in 1788, and an edition of his collected writings was compiled, printed in 1792. Bräker was not successful as a businessman. He was in debt, and in 1797, a year before his death, he was forced to sell his house in Wattwil. Three out of seven children born to his wife died before reaching maturity. Bräker lived to see, and was perturbed by, the French invasion of Switzerland in the spring of 1798. He died on 11 September 1798 in Wattwil, aged 62.

== Publications ==
- Ein wort der vermahnung, An mich und die Meinigen Dass nichts besers sey den Gott förchten zu allezeiten, 1768–1771.
- Raissonierendes Baurengespräch über das Bücherlesen, 1777.
- Vermischte Lieder vor den Land-Mann, 1779.
- Etwas über William Shakespeares Schauspiele, von einem armen, ungelehrten Weltbürger, der das Glück genoß, ihn zu lesen, 1780.
- Die Gerichtsnacht oder Was ihr wollt (play, "The night of judgement, or 'As You Like It'") 1780.
- Jauss, der Libens Ritter (fragments of a novel, contained in the diaries of 1789/90)
- Bräker's autobiography was first published in 1788 to 1789 in Schweitzersches Museum in 13 parts, edited in with Hans Heinrich Füssli in Zürich under the full title of Lebensgeschichte und natürliche Abentheuer eines armen Mannes von Tockenburg in two volumes in 1789,

A collection of works was edited by H. H. Füssli in 1792, as Sämtliche Schriften des Armen Mannes im Tockenburg. A modern edition of Bräker's works was published with C. H. Beck (1998–2010) in four volumes.

== Secondary literature ==
- Holger Böning, Ulrich Bräker, der arme Mann aus dem Toggenburg. Eine Biographie. Zürich (1998).
- Samuel Voellmy (1955). "Bräker, Ulrich". Neue Deutsche Biographie (in German). Vol. 2. Berlin: Duncker & Humblot. p. 506. (full text online).
- Hermann Wartmann (1876). "Brägger, Ulrich" . Allgemeine Deutsche Biographie (in German). Vol. 3. Leipzig: Duncker & Humblot. p. 232.
- Alfred Messerli u. Adolf Muschg (eds.): Schreibsucht – autobiografische Schriften des Pietisten Ulrich Bräker (1725–1798). Göttingen, 2004.
- Christoph Blocher, Würdigung grosser Toggenburger Persönlichkeiten Huldrych Zwingli (1484-1531), Ulrich Bräker (1735-1798), Babeli Giezendanner (1831-1905) und ihre Bedeutung für die heutige Schweiz , published version of a speech held on 2 January 2013 in Wattwil.
- Alois Stadler and Wolfgang Göldi (eds.), Ulrich Bräker über "Himmel, Erde und Höll", illustriert mit Bildern aus seiner Zeit, 1998.
