= Dotzlar =

- Village of Bad Berleburg
- Interactive map of Dotzlar
- Location within Germany Location within North Rhine-Westphalia
- Coordinates: 51°00′53″N 08°24′41″E
- Country: Germany
- State: North Rhine-Westphalia
- Admin. region: Arnsberg
- District: Siegen-Wittgenstein
- Town: Bad Berleburg
- Elevation: 390–650 m (1,280–2,130 ft)

Population (2016-12-31)
  - Total: 829
- Time zone: UTC+01:00 (CET)
  - Summer (DST): UTC+02:00 (CEST)
- Postal codes: 57319
- Dialling codes: 02751
- Vehicle registration: SI, BLB
- Website: www.dotzlar.de

Dotzlar is a district of Bad Berleburg in the district Siegen-Wittgenstein in North Rhine-Westphalia.

== Geography ==
=== Location ===
Dotzlar is located in the air line about 3.5 km south-southeast of the city center of Bad Berleburg, whose area is located in the northeast of the district Siegen-Wittgenstein in the middle of the Rothaargebirge. The border in the west is at the same time a circle border to the Olpe district. To the north is the Hochsauerlandkreis. The eastern border forms the border to the state of Hesse. The city of Bad Laasphe is bordered to the south and the municipality of Erndtebrück to the southwest.

=== Mountains and valleys ===
Dotzlar is situated at an altitude of 390 to 600 meters above sea level. The lowest point is in the river banks of the Eder, on the right south-west bank of which it borders with the accompanying leaf-roth. The highest elevations around Dotzlar are Dotzlar Castle (551 m asl), Feuerloh (593 m asl), Eisenstein (580 m asl) and Sassenhausen (606 m asl).

=== Neighborhoods ===
Dotzlar borders Arfeld in the east. In the south, the border continues to Sassenhausen and further past Weidenhausen. West is followed by Hemschlar and Raumland. In the north, the border to the core town of Bad Berleburg is closed.

== History ==
The village of Dotzlar is one of the oldest settlements in Wittgenstein. The final settlement comes from Celtic, as are the names of the villages of Hemschlar, Schullar, etc. The old river, which still bears the name of the mountain fortress may prove the old age of the village. Dotzlar is mentioned for the first time in 1418; But it is assumed that the foundation was already 500–600 years earlier.

Since 1 January 1975, the former municipality of Dotzlar has been a district of Bad Berleburg, one of the largest cities in Germany due to the municipal redevelopment.

== Economy and Infrastructure ==
=== Traffic ===
The village is crossed from East to West by Landstrasse 553 and connects Dotzlar with Hatzfeld in the east and Raumland in the west. From north to south, Landstraße 718 crosses the village and leads from the north from Bad Berleburg to the south towards Bad Laasphe.

=== Industry and commerce ===
Dotzlar is home to a number of trading and crafts companies. This includes a roofing company, a heating construction company, a firewood trade and a grocery store.

== Literature ==
- Karl Pöppel (Hrsg.): The middle Edertal - a home book for Dotzlar, Arfeld, Richstein. Bad Berleburg 1982
- Peter Schneider: Death at the Meisbach: crash of the Lancaster ND441 at Dotzlar. In: Wittgenstein. Leaves of the Wittgensteiner Heimatverein, 2007, p. 130 ff.
