= Jacob Nolde =

American industrialist (1859–1916)

- Jacob Nolde taking a break from work in his forest (note rolled up sleeves).
- Born: February 28, 1859; Berleburg, Kingdom of Prussia
- Died: November 22, 1916 (aged 57); Reading, Pennsylvania
- Occupation(s): American conservationist, forester, philanthropist, industrial baron
- Spouses: Lydia Lorah (m. 1889; died 1892) Anna Louise Horst (m. 1893)
- Children: 6

Jacob Nolde (February 28, 1859 – November 22, 1916) was an American industrialist and environmentalist who was largely responsible for the creation of Nolde Forest Environmental Education Center, a Pennsylvania state park in Berks County, Pennsylvania in the United States.

Nolde was an emigrants from the German Empire who came to the United States in 1880. He was born in 1859 in Berleburg, Kingdom of Prussia. Nolde may have been descended from a family of foresters, but this fact is unclear. It is thought that his grandfather was a forester who cared for one of the many "beautifully manicured princely forests" of 18th and 19th century Germany. Nolde may have been inspired by the forests of his native land when he began the project of creating a coniferous forest on his property in Cumru Township just south of Reading.

== Hosiery baron ==
Nolde arrived on a steamship in 1880 in Philadelphia, Pennsylvania. He was drawn to the German speaking communities of southeastern Pennsylvania and quickly found employment as a weaver for the Louis Kraemer Woolen Mills near Reading. Nolde soon rose to the top of the corporate ladder at Kraemer Mills, from there he was able to acquire much of the machinery that Kraemer Mills had used in their hosiery business. Nolde established his own hosiery factory in Reading in 1888, just eight years after leaving Germany. Nolde took on some partners, Jacob Lorah and George Horst, and was able to expand his hosiery business. His operation, Nolde and Horst Company, employed 500 workers who operated about 400 knitting machines in 1897.

The factory was devastated by a fire in 1899, but Nolde and Horst were soon back in business after rebuilding the factory. The new factory had the most up to date knitting equipment and by 1910 it covered an entire city block in Reading, with 250,000 square feet (23,000 m^{2}) of floor space and more than 1,500 employees. Nolde had situated himself to become one of the leading citizens of Reading.

== Leading citizen and environmentalist ==
Nolde was married twice. He married women who also happened to be the sisters of his partners, Jacob Lorah and George Horst. He married his first wife, Lydia Lorah, in 1889. Together they had two children, Ella and Carl, but Lydia died shortly after the birth of Carl. Nolde then married Anna Louise Horst in 1893, and she bore four children: George, Carol, Hans, and Louise. The family lived in a large home on the slopes of Mount Penn, near his factories in Reading. Nolde then set out to better the life of his family by creating a forest near their new home, "Sheerlund", which he built south of Reading in Cumru Township.

When Nolde purchased the land, a single white pine was growing there. Inspired by this single tree, Nolde set out to create a "luxury forest" to be a source of family pride and pleasure. The massive white pine is now surrounded by a forest of Douglas fir and Norway spruce trees that were planted under Nolde and later, the supervision of Austrian born forester William Kohout.

Nolde dreamt that his forest would resemble the coniferous forests of his native Westphalia. He bought about 500 acres (2 km²) of future timberland in Cumru Township in 1904 and continued to acquire the land that would become Nolde Forest Environmental Education Center until his death in 1916. This land had been either farmland that had lain fallow for a number of years, or scrubby deciduous forest just beginning to recover from being stripped to make charcoal by colliers for the nearby iron furnaces. Nearly 500,000 coniferous trees were planted by 1910, but then Nolde realized that his dream of a small forest had surpassed all his expectations and saw the need to properly manage the forest.

Nolde hired William Kohout as head forester, and Kohout hired a contractor to build roads and trails to the forest to help prevent and fight forest fires. Kohout was a master forester from Austria, who had attended forestry schools in Bohemia and Saxony and received a degree from the University of Vienna. Kohout came to America in the 1880s or 1890s and first worked as an engineer for a mining company before getting back into forestry. Kohout then worked on a private estate as a forester near Wilkes-Barre, where he first came into contact with Jacob Nolde. Together they started the forest that became Nolde Forest Environmental Education Center in 1970.

However, the Nolde Forest Environmental Education Center is not the only lasting mark that Jacob Nolde left before his unexpected death in 1916. The following quotes are excerpts from his obituary.

It has been said by one in authority that the total of Mr. Nolde's benefactions will never be fully known but that they have amounted to a very large sum. His contributions to war relief funds at home and abroad, to charities and institutional work, to church funds and to the needy who applied for aid had amounted to many thousands of dollars. He was one of the most ready men to help any good cause. The impartiality with which he gave of his money is well shown in a recent contribution of $1,000 to the building of the Reformed College in Sendai, Japan. This given despite the fact that Mr. Nolde was a native of Germany to whom Germany has always been dear and that Japan is now at war with the Fatherland. Mr. Nolde has been called frequently the father of the Berks County Conservation Association. He was one of the chief instruments in forming it and gave valuable assistance in many ways. His own country place, Sheerlund, near the Centre House is not only one of the show places of Berks but it is on this magnificent estate that many of the German ideas of reforestation are being demonstrated. He was a member of the American Forestry Association. At his country place ... he has perhaps the largest private growth of young pine trees in the country. This estate was his great pleasure and nothing gratified him more than to take appreciative people over it.

Nolde also donated $15,000 to Mercersburg Academy in Mercersburg, Pennsylvania to build a gymnasium there to honor his son Carl, who had died while he was a student at the academy. This gym is still being used today by the students at Mercersburg.

Although Nolde gained tremendous wealth, there is evidence that he never lost touch with his working-class roots. Visitors to his factories were often surprised to find him working alongside his employees and he put much personal effort into creating his forest himself, taking on the responsibility of personally planting trees and helping with the upkeep of the forest.

=== Nolde Forest Environmental Education Center ===
Nolde Forest was acquired by the Commonwealth of Pennsylvania in the late 1960s. The Environmental Education Center was established by the Berks County Intermediate Unit with the help of grants from the United States Government in 1970. Nolde Forest Environmental Education Center was the first such center to be owned and operated by the Pennsylvania Department of Conservation and Natural Resources.

Jacob Nolde was a pioneering environmentalist whose work lives on today at Nolde Forest Environmental Education Center. The main purpose of Nolde Forest Environmental Education Center is to provide environmental education for the citizens of southeastern Pennsylvania and specifically the students of the nearby elementary schools, high schools, colleges, and universities. Nolde Forest stays busy offering hands on opportunities to these students and their teachers with a "discovery and problem solving" approach. These are lessons that Nolde sought to pass onto his children and succeeding generations of Pennsylvanians.
