= Hans-Werner Schwarz =

German politician

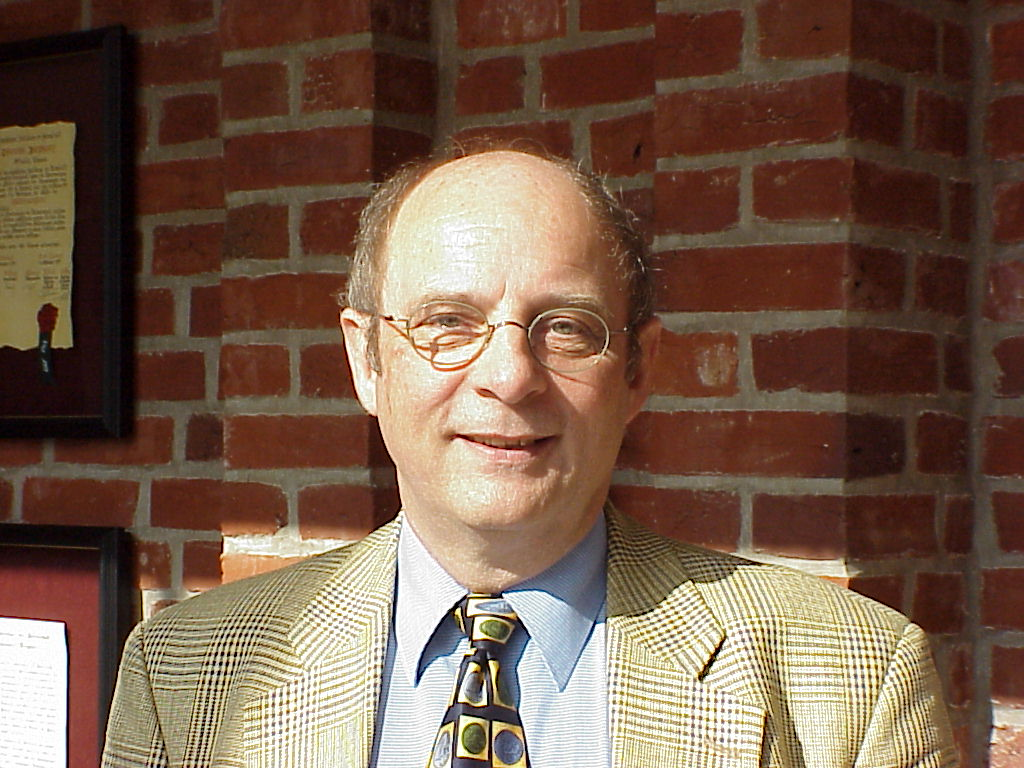
Hans-Werner Schwarz.

Hans-Werner Schwarz (born 21 September 1946 in Bad Berleburg) is a German politician for the Free Democratic Party.

He was elected to the Landtag of Lower Saxony in 2003, and has been re-elected on one occasion.
