= Gerhard Dickel =

German scientist (1913–2017)

Gerhard Dickel (28 October 1913 – 3 November 2017) was a German chemist and physicist. He developed a thermal diffusion method of separating isotopes with Klaus Clusius in 1938, sometimes referred to as Clusius-Dickel separation.

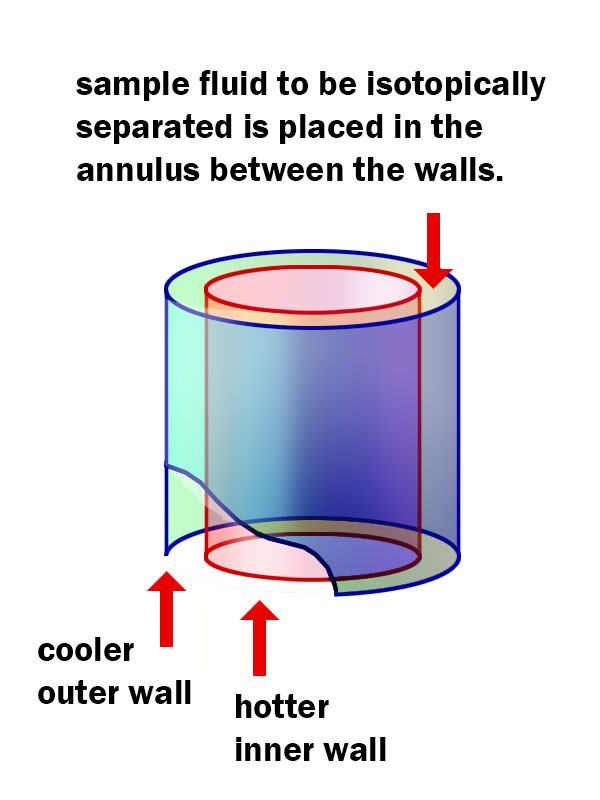
In this version, the fluid with different isotopes is contained in the annulus under optimal conditions, undergoing convection in the temperature gradient between the walls. The central cavity within the inner wall might contain hot water with the exterior of the outer wall jacketed in cold water, for example. The process can also use a flat-plate cell instead of an annulus.

== Biography ==
He was born in Augsburg. He studied under Clusius at the Institute for Physical Chemistry of the Ludwig-Maximilians-Universität München. Clusius and Dickel published a paper in 1938, where they announced that they had separated isotopes of neon. They had discovered that the normally inefficient thermal diffusion method – where isotopes in a fluid diffuse towards opposing hotter and colder regions – could be improved by more than four orders of magnitude if there was also an optimal convection current between the regions to avoid a steady concentration gradient and "back diffusion" developing. In 1939, the year Dickel defended his PhD thesis, the pair announced that they had also separated isotopes of chlorine with the same process. It was explored on a large scale in the USA during World War II as a possible method for separating uranium-235 from the more abundant uranium-238 in order to make an atomic bomb (the more-efficient gaseous diffusion was eventually chosen).

Dickel became a substitute manager of the Institute for Physical Chemistry, followed by a position as adjunct professor. In 1957, he became head of department at the university's Physics Institute. The same year he received the Bodenstein Prize from the German Bunsen Society for Physical Chemistry, for work on isotope exchange and on diffusion in gases and gels. He retired in 1978.

He died in 2017, aged 104.
