= Nolde Forest Environmental Education Center =

State park in Pennsylvania, USA

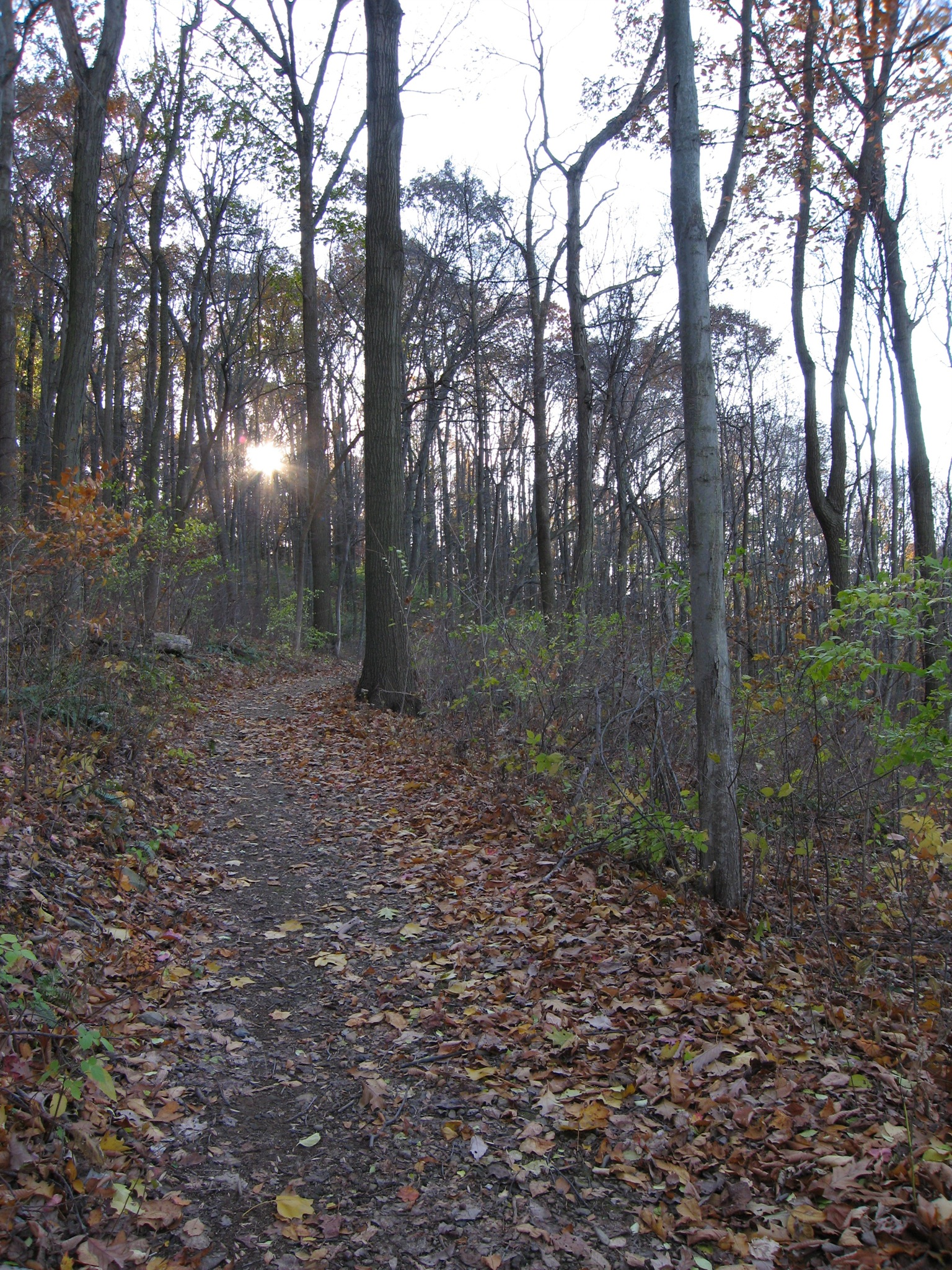

- Location within Pennsylvania Location within the United States
- Interactive map of Nolde Forest Environmental Education Center
- Location: Cumru Township, Berks County, Pennsylvania, United States
- Coordinates: 40°16′32″N 75°56′58″W
- Area: 725 acres (293 ha)
- Elevation: 718 feet (219 m)
- Established: 1970
- Administrator: Pennsylvania Department of Conservation and Natural Resources
- Website: Official website
- Pennsylvania State Parks

Nolde Forest Environmental Educational Center is a 725-acre (293 ha) Pennsylvania state park in Cumru Township, Berks County, Pennsylvania, in the United States. Programs are offered for youth and adult groups, school groups, and individuals. The center grounds provide opportunities for hiking, birdwatching, and nature photography. The park is open from sunrise until sunset. Nolde Forest Environmental Education Center is on Pennsylvania Route 625 just south of Reading.

== History ==
Jacob Nolde taking a break while working at his forest. Note the rolled up sleeves. Nolde was often seen working side by side with his workmen at his factories and in his forest.

Nolde Forest Environmental Education center is on land that was formerly owned by Jacob Nolde, an environmentalist who immigrated to the United States from Germany. Nolde had made his fortune in the hosiery industry. When Nolde purchased the land, a single large white pine was growing there. Inspired by this single tree, Nolde set out to create a "luxury forest" to be a source of family pride and pleasure. Known as the "Inspiration Pine" by the family, the pine was soon surrounded by a forest of native and foreign coniferous trees that were planted under Nolde and later, the supervision of Austrian born forester William Kohout.

Nolde dreamt that his forest would resemble the coniferous forests of his native Westphalia. He bought about 500 acres (200 ha) of future timberland in Cumru Township in 1904 and continued to acquire the land that would become Nolde Forest Environmental Education Center until his death in 1916. This land had been either farmland that had lain fallow for a number of years, or scrubby deciduous forest just beginning to recover from being stripped to make charcoal by colliers for the nearby iron furnaces. Nearly 500,000 coniferous trees were planted by 1910, but then Nolde realized that his dream of a small forest had surpassed all his expectations and saw the need to properly manage the forest.

Nolde hired William Kohout as head forester, and Kohout hired a contractor to build roads and trails to the forest to help prevent and fight forest fires. Kohout was a master forester from Austria, who had attended forestry schools in Bohemia and Saxony and received a degree from the University of Vienna. Kohout came to America in the 1880s or 1890s and first worked as an engineer for a mining company before getting back into forestry. Kohout then worked on a private estate as a forester near Wilkes-Barre, where he first came into contact with Jacob Nolde.

Nolde Forest was acquired by the Commonwealth of Pennsylvania in the late 1960s. The Environmental Education Center was established by the Berks County Intermediate Unit with the help of grants from the United States Government in 1970. Nolde Forest Environmental Education Center was the first such center to be owned and operated by the Pennsylvania Department of Conservation and Natural Resources.

== Environmental Education ==
The main purpose of Nolde Forest Environmental Education Center is to provide environmental education for the citizens of southeastern Pennsylvania and specifically the students of nearby elementary schools, high schools, colleges, and universities. Nolde Forest offers hands-on opportunities to these students and their teachers with a "discovery and problem solving" approach.
