= Berleburg Bible =

18th-century German Bible translation

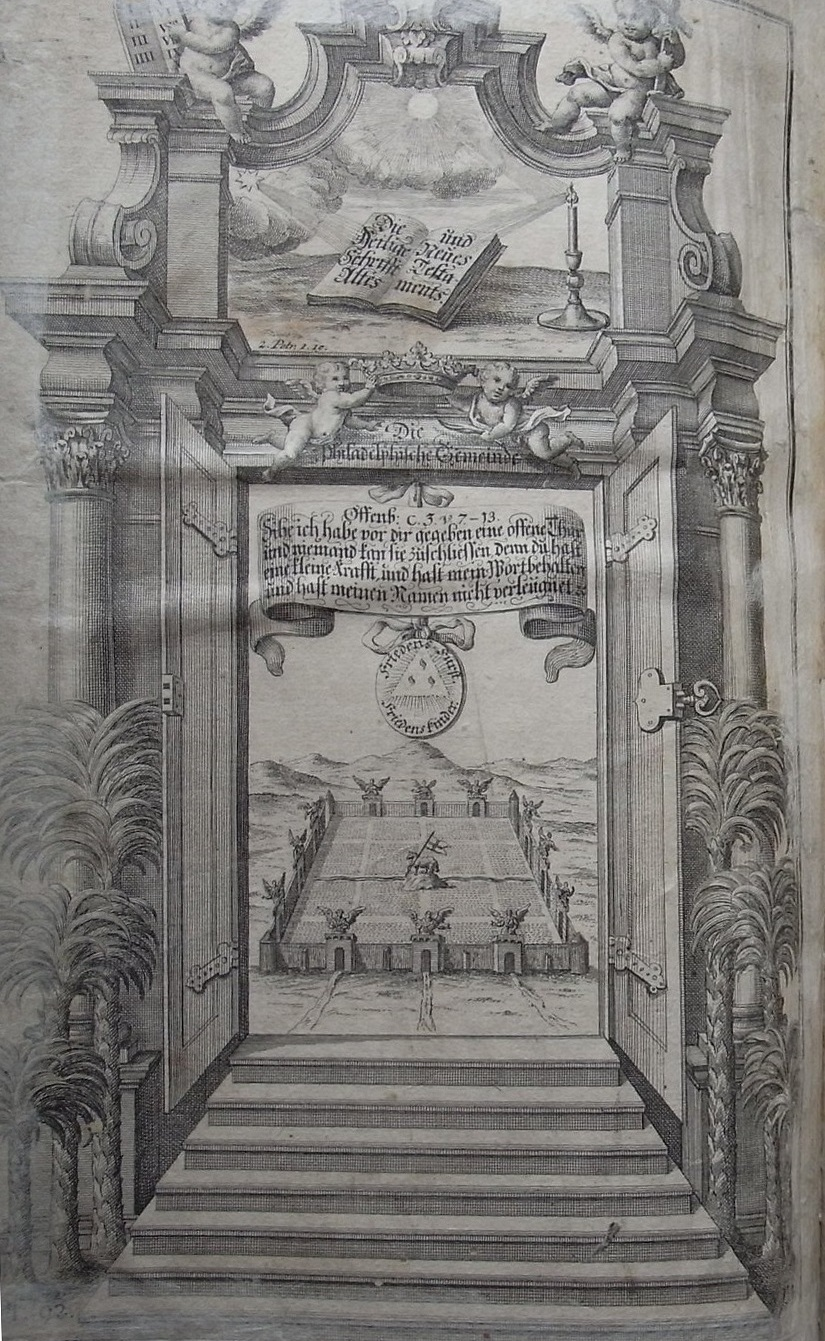
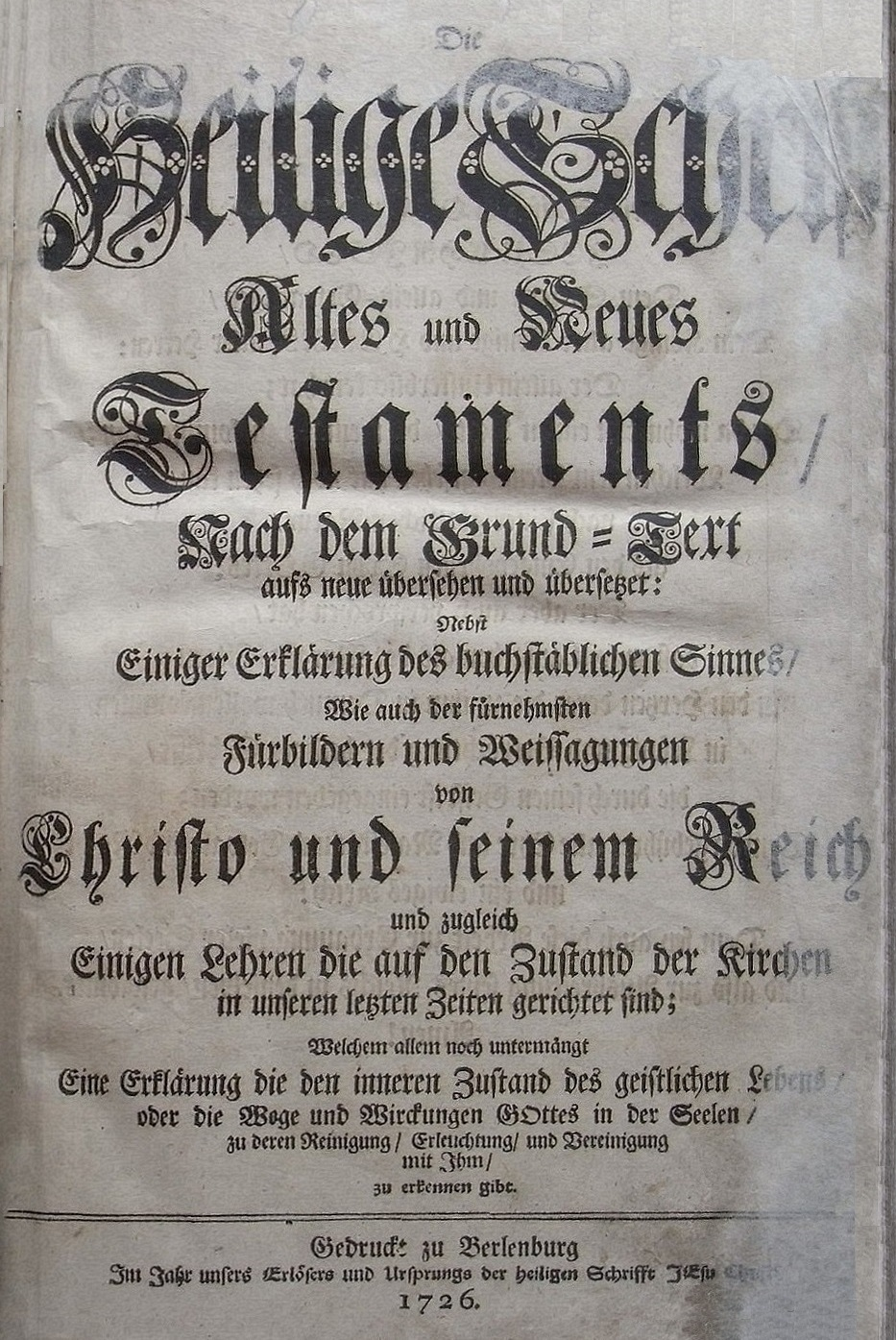
Berleburg Bible (1726), title engraving and title page

The Berleburg Bible (Berleburger Bibel) is a German translation of the Bible with copious commentary in eight volumes, compiled in Bad Berleburg during 1726–1742. It is an original translation from the Hebrew and Greek. Along with the Piscator-Bibel (1602–1604), it was among the first German translations to be independent of Luther's Bible.

== Authors ==
It was the project of pietistic theologian Johann Friedrich Haug (1680–1753), his brother Johann Jacob Haug (1690–1756) and Berleburg pastor Ludwig Christof Schefer (1669–1731). The brothers Haug had moved to Sayn-Wittgenstein-Berleburg in 1720, at the time a center of radical pietism.

== Context within German mysticism ==
The biblical commentary has the aim of explaining "the inner state of spiritual life, or the ways and actions of God inside the souls towards their purification, enlightenment and unification with Him" influenced by earlier (17th-century) German mysticism and by the Philadelphians.

== Reception and impact ==
The Berleburg Bible was well received in 18th-century pietism, but its long-term influence remained comparatively minor due to its bulk, which imposed "natural limits" on its distribution. A reprint was published in Stuttgart in 1856. A second edition was planned but never completed.
