= Dante Santoni =

American politician

Dante Santoni Jr.

Member of the Pennsylvania House of Representatives from the 126th district
- In office January 5, 1993 – November 30, 2012
- Preceded by: Paul J. Angstadt
- Succeeded by: Mark Rozzi

Personal details
- Born: September 1, 1960 (age 66) Muhlenberg Township, Berks County, Pennsylvania
- Party: Democratic
- Spouse: Sharon Santoni
- Children: Emma Rose Santoni; Lia Rae Santoni
- Education: Villanova University
- Occupation: Finance officer, politician

Dante Santoni Jr. (born September 1, 1960) is former a Democratic member of the Pennsylvania House of Representatives, representing the 126th Legislative District from 1993 to 2010. The district is located in Berks County, covering Alsace Township, Laureldale, Lower Alsace Township, Mount Penn, Muhlenberg Township, and St. Lawrence, and parts of Exeter Township and Reading.

== Biography ==
Santoni was born in Reading, Pennsylvania, to Dante and Carmella (née Cagnetti) Santoni. He graduated from Muhlenberg High School in 1978, and earned a B.S. in accounting from Villanova University in 1982. He then worked as a field representative and loan officer with Southeast Farm Credit Service until 1983. Between 1984 and 1992, he was finance director, township secretary, and commissioner in Muhlenberg Township.

Santoni was elected to the Pennsylvania House of Representatives on November 3, 1992, and was sworn into office on January 5, 1993. He has subsequently been re-elected nine times. Following the death of state Senator Michael O'Pake in 2010, he briefly ran for the Democratic nomination for the 11th District but withdrew in favor of Judy Schwank, a former Berks County Commissioner.
