= U.S. Route 422 Business (Reading, Pennsylvania) =

Business route in Pennsylvania, United States

U.S. Route 422 Business

Route information
- Auxiliary route of US 422
- Maintained by PennDOT
- Length: 7.285 mi (11.724 km)

Major junctions
- West end: US 222 / US 422 in Wyomissing
- US 422 in West Reading; PA 183 in Reading; US 222 Bus. in Reading; PA 562 in St. Lawrence
- East end: US 422 in Reiffton

Location
- Country: United States
- State: Pennsylvania
- Counties: Berks

Highway system
- United States Numbered Highway System; List; Special; Divided; Pennsylvania State Route System; Interstate; US; State; Scenic; Legislative

U.S. Route 422 Business (US 422 Bus.) is a 7.29-mile-long (11.73 km) business route of US 422 located in the Reading, Pennsylvania area. The route is one of four auxiliary routes of US 422 in Pennsylvania. Its western terminus is at an interchange with US 222 and US 422 in Wyomissing. Its eastern terminus is at an interchange with US 422 in Reiffton. US 422 Bus. heads east from US 222/US 422 along Penn Avenue, passing through Wyomissing and West Reading. The route has an interchange with the US 422 freeway before it crosses the Schuylkill River into Reading. US 422 Bus. passes through downtown Reading on the one-way pair of Franklin Street eastbound and Washington Street westbound, intersecting the southern terminus of Pennsylvania Route 183 (PA 183) and crossing US 222 Bus. The business route heads into the eastern part of the city southeast on Perkiomen Avenue before following the one-way pair of Perkiomen Avenue eastbound and Mineral Spring Road westbound into Mount Penn. US 422 Bus. continues along Perkiomen Avenue to St. Lawrence, where it intersects the western terminus of PA 562 and turns southeast. The route passes through Reiffton before it merges into eastbound US 422.

With the creation of the U.S. Highway System in 1926, the road between Harrisburg and Reading was designated as part of US 22, which ran along what was designated the William Penn Highway in 1916 and PA 3 in 1924 as well as PA 13, while the road between Reading and Philadelphia was designated as US 120, which ran concurrent with PA 13. In 1928, the US 120/PA 13 designation between Reading and Philadelphia was changed to US 422/PA 17 in order to provide for one number for the Benjamin Franklin Highway. The concurrent state route designations were removed from US 22 and US 422 by 1930. US 22 headed into Reading on Penn Street and continued east to 9th Street, where it turned north and US 422 continued along Penn Street and Perkiomen Avenue east out of Reading. US 22 ran concurrent with PA 83 between 2nd and 9th streets while US 422 ran concurrent with PA 73 between Chestnut Street in Reading and 23rd Street in Mount Penn. In 1931, US 22 was moved to a more direct alignment between Harrisburg and Allentown, and US 422 was extended west along the former alignment between Harrisburg and Reading. In the 1930s, US 422/PA 73 was shifted to Mineral Spring Road between Reading and Mount Penn in the 1930s and a one-way pair along Perkiomen Avenue and Mineral Spring Road in the 1950s. US 422 was shifted to the Warren Street Bypass and West Shore Bypass, and US 422 Bus. was designated onto the former alignment through Reading. The concurrent PA 83 and PA 73 designations were removed by 1966. In the 1970s, US 422 Bus. was shifted to its current one-way pair through downtown Reading.

== Route description ==
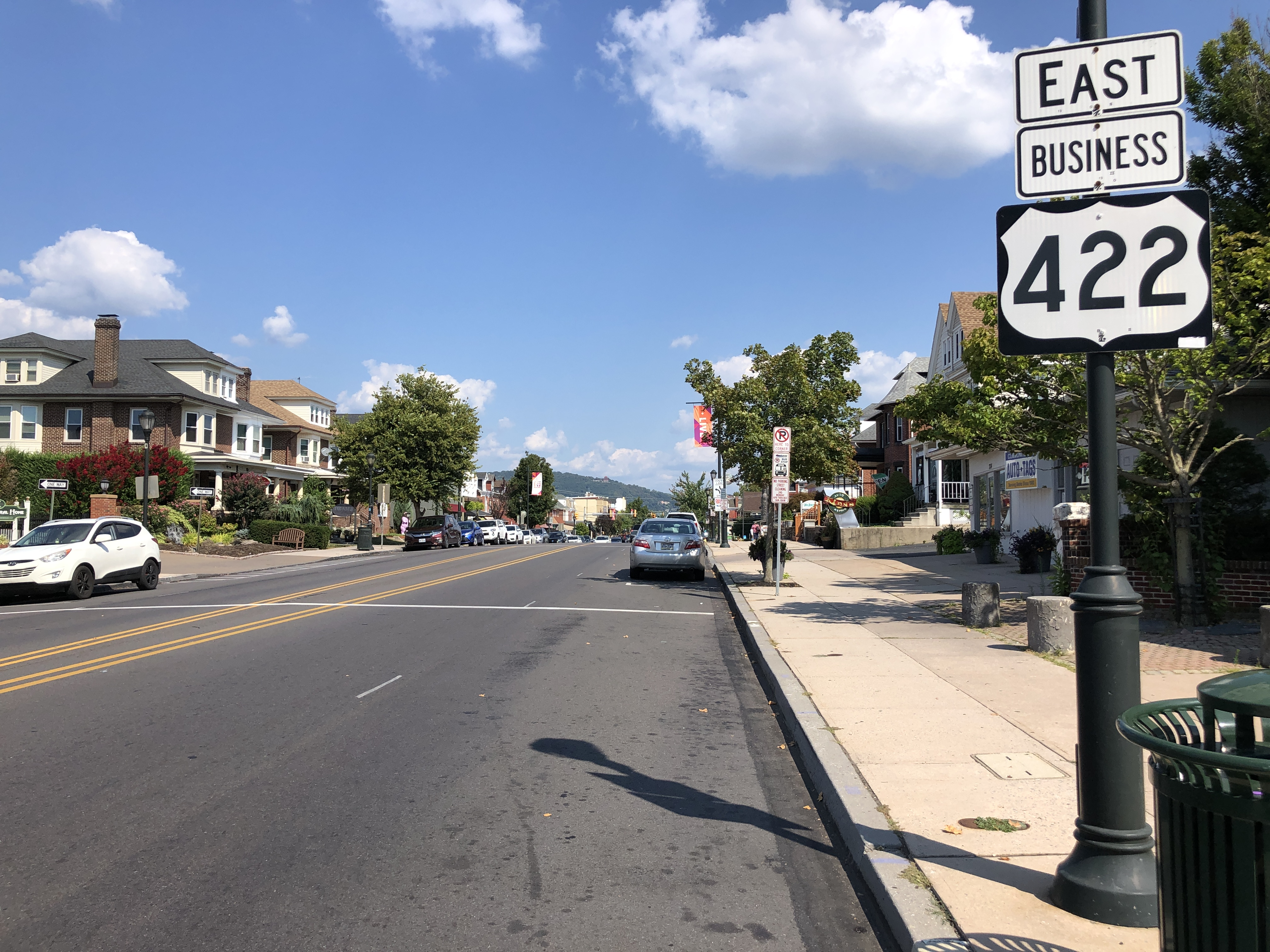
US 422 Bus. eastbound in West Reading

US 422 Bus. begins at an interchange with the US 222/US 422 freeway (Warren Street Bypass) in the borough of Wyomissing in Berks County. The business route begins at the point US 422 splits from Penn Avenue to merge with northbound US 222 on the Warren Street Bypass, with the business route continuing east as four-lane divided Penn Avenue. After splitting from US 422, the route passes over Norfolk Southern's Harrisburg Line and crosses under US 222 (Warren Street Bypass), with interchange ramps providing access. Past this interchange, the road continues northeast between the railroad tracks to the north and residential areas to the south. US 422 Bus. heads further south from the railroad and continues past a mix of homes and businesses as a two-lane undivided road. The route curves east and passes to the south of commercial development at the former Berkshire Knitting Mills. Past this, the road enters the borough of West Reading and becomes three lanes with a center left-turn lane, passing a mix of homes and businesses before running through the commercial downtown. Farther east, US 422 Bus. passes more businesses, widening to a four-lane divided highway as it crosses under Norfolk Southern's Harrisburg Line #1 before reaching a cloverleaf interchange with the US 422 freeway (West Shore Bypass).

Past the US 422 interchange, the business route crosses the Schuylkill River and then the Schuylkill River Trail on the Penn Street Bridge and enters the city of Reading. Here, US 422 Bus. becomes Penn Street and passes over Norfolk Southern's Spruce Street Industrial Track and River Road near Reading Area Community College before it reaches an intersection with 2nd Street after descending off the bridge. At this point, US 422 Bus. splits into a one-way pair. The eastbound direction heads south on one-way, three-lane South 2nd Street before turning east onto one-way, two-lane Franklin Street while the westbound direction follows one-way, three-lane Washington Street west and one-way, four-lane North 2nd Street south to Penn Street. At the intersection of North 2nd and Washington Streets, westbound US 422 Bus. intersects the southern terminus of PA 183. The business route continues east along the one-way pair of Franklin Street eastbound and Washington Street westbound into the commercial downtown of Reading, intersecting US 222 Bus. at 5th Street. US 422 Bus. heads east, with the westbound direction passing north of the Berks County Courthouse, and crosses Norfolk Southern's Harrisburg Line #2 at-grade eastbound and on a bridge westbound, where the eastbound direction passes north of the former Franklin Street station at the railroad tracks before heading south of the BARTA Transportation Center serving BARTA buses. Following this, the business route heads out of the downtown area, with the westbound direction of Washington Street becoming two lanes. The route heads through urban areas of rowhouses and businesses before it reaches 11th Street. At this point, westbound US 422 Bus. follows one-way North 11th Street northbound between Penn and Washington Street and runs northwest on two-way, two-lane Perkiomen Avenue east of the 11th Street intersection.

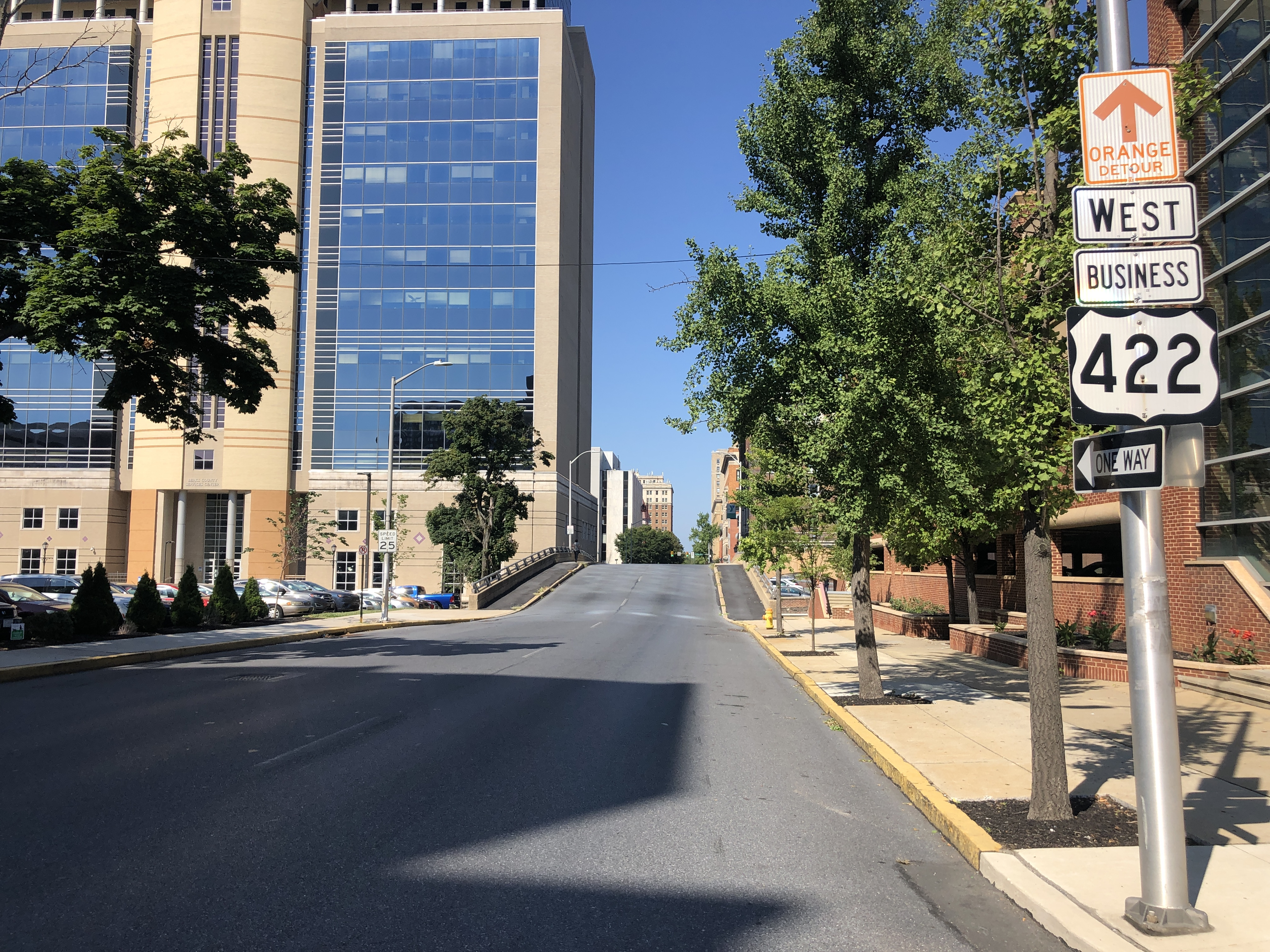
US 422 Bus. westbound on Washington Street in Reading

Eastbound US 422 Bus. joins the westbound direction of the route at South 13th Street, at which point both directions of the route continue southeast along two-lane undivided Perkiomen Avenue past homes. Upon reaching Chestnut Street, US 422 Bus. splits into another one-way pair. The eastbound direction continues southeast along two-way Perkiomen Avenue, curving to the east at South 14th Street, while the westbound direction runs along two-way, two-lane Mineral Spring Road. The one-way pair continues east through residential areas to the south of forested Mount Penn. Westbound US 422 Bus. widens to a four-lane undivided road and passes over 19th Street on the Lindbergh Viaduct, at which point it becomes Howard Boulevard. The one-way pair continues into the borough of Mount Penn and passes between Aulenbach Cemetery before Howard Boulevard heads southeast to join Perkiomen Avenue at the 23rd Street intersection in residential and commercial areas. At this point, US 422 Bus. continues east on two-lane undivided Perkiomen Avenue past a mix of homes and businesses. The route crosses into the borough of St. Lawrence and reaches an intersection with the western terminus of PA 562. Past this, US 422 Bus. turns to the southeast and becomes a four-lane undivided road continuing through developed areas, crossing into Exeter Township. The road continues through suburban residential neighborhoods in the community of Reiffton. Farther southeast, the route runs through business areas, passing to the northeast of the Reading Mall, and reaches its eastern terminus at the point it merges into eastbound US 422 at the eastern end of the West Shore Bypass freeway.

== History ==
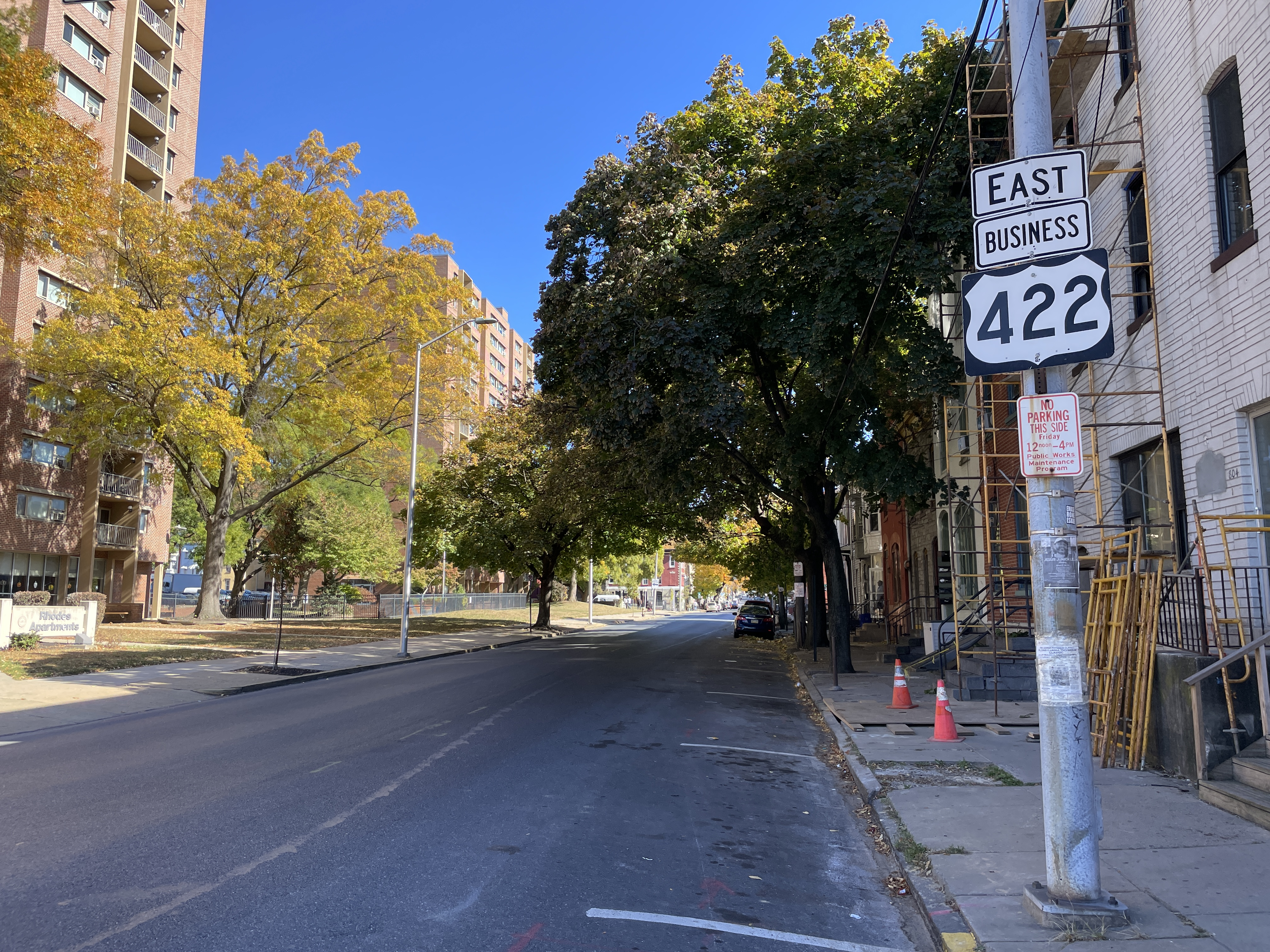
US 422 Bus. eastbound past 8th Street in Reading

When Pennsylvania first legislated routes in 1911, the route heading west from Reading toward Lebanon was designated as Legislative Route 149 and the route heading east from Reading toward Pottstown and Norristown was designated as Legislative Route 146. In 1916, the road between Reading and Harrisburg became a part of the William Penn Highway, an auto trail that ran from Pittsburgh to New York City. In 1924, the William Penn Highway was designated as PA 3 with the establishment of the first state route numbers in Pennsylvania. With the establishment of the U.S. Highway System in 1926, the road between Harrisburg and Reading was designated as part of US 22, which ran concurrent with PA 3/PA 13, while the road between Reading and Philadelphia was designated as part of US 120, which ran concurrent with PA 13. The same year, plans were made for the Benjamin Franklin Highway, which would connect Philadelphia and Omaha, Nebraska, following US 120 between Philadelphia and Reading and US 22 between Reading and Harrisburg. A request was made to renumber the section of US 120 between Philadelphia and Reading to US 422 as to provide a common number for the Benjamin Franklin Highway, which US 422 followed west of Ebensburg and was connected by US 22 between Reading and Ebensburg. In 1928, US 120 between Philadelphia and Reading was renumbered to US 422, and the concurrent PA 13 designation was replaced with PA 17. In addition, PA 13 was removed from US 22/PA 3 to the west of Reading. By 1930, the concurrent PA 3 designation was removed from US 22 and the concurrent PA 17 designation was removed from US 422. At this time, US 22 entered Reading from the west along William Penn Highway and crossed the Schuylkill River into the city, where it headed east along Penn Street. US 22 ran concurrent with PA 83 between 2nd and 9th Streets. At 9th Street, US 22 turned north and US 222/PA 83 headed south, while US 422 continued east on Penn Street. US 422 turned southeast onto Perkiomen Avenue and ran concurrent with PA 73 between Chestnut Street in Reading and 23rd Street in Mount Penn.

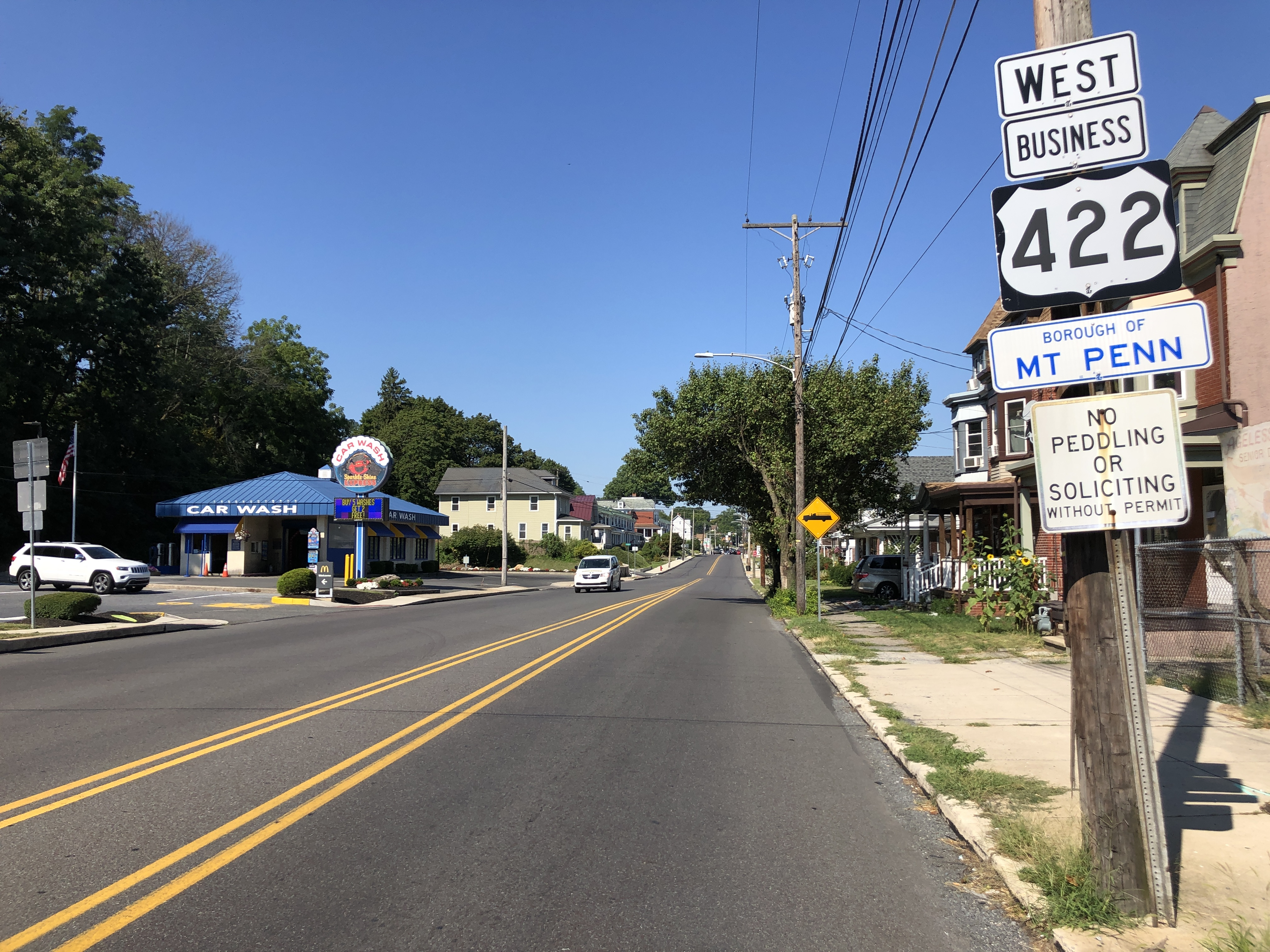
US 422 Bus. westbound entering Mount Penn past PA 562

In 1931, plans were made to reroute US 22 and the William Penn Highway to a more direct alignment between Harrisburg and Allentown by way of PA 43. As a result of the rerouting of US 22, the road between Harrisburg and Reading would become a western extension of US 422 while the road between Reading and Allentown would become a northern extension of US 222. The changes were approved by the American Association of State Highway Officials on June 8, 1931. Signs were changed to reflect the new designations on May 31, 1932, with the new route designations officially in place on June 1, 1932. In the 1930s, US 422 through the western suburbs of Reading was renamed to Penn Avenue. Also, US 422/PA 73 was rerouted to use Mineral Spring Road between Reading and Mount Penn. In the 1950s, US 422/PA 73 was split into the one-way pair of Perkiomen Avenue eastbound and Mineral Spring Road westbound between Reading and Mount Penn. In 1964, US 422 was routed off city streets in the Reading area, using the Warren Street Bypass and the newly completed West Shore Bypass. As a result, US 422 Bus. was designated onto the former alignment of US 422. By 1966, the concurrent PA 83 and PA 73 designations in Reading were removed. In the 1970s, US 422 Bus. was split to follow a one-way pair in downtown Reading along Franklin Street eastbound and Washington Street westbound.

On June 22, 2000, the section of US 422 Bus. between PA 562 and the eastern terminus at US 422, along with US 422 between US 422 Bus. and Shelbourne Road, in Exeter Township was designated by an act of the Pennsylvania General Assembly as the Albert Boscov Commemorative Highway in honor of Albert Boscov, the longtime CEO of the department store chain Boscov's.

== Major intersections ==
The entire route is in Berks County.

Location	mi	km	Destinations	Notes
Wyomissing	0.000	0.000	US 422 west (Penn Avenue) – Lebanon	Interchange; access to westbound US 422 and from eastbound US 422; western terminus
Wyomissing			US 222 (Warren Street Bypass) to US 422 east – Reading, Allentown, Pottstown, Lancaster	Interchange
West Reading	2.182	3.512	US 422 (West Shore Bypass) – Pottstown, Lebanon	Interchange
Reading	2.506	4.033	PA 183 north (Washington Street / North 2nd Street) – Pottsville	Southern terminus of PA 183; short concurrency with PA 183 northbound on Washington Street westbound between 3rd and 2nd Streets and with PA 183 southbound on North 2nd Street westbound between Washington and Penn streets
Reading	2.930	4.715	US 222 Bus. (5th Street)	
St. Lawrence	5.564	8.954	PA 562 east (St. Lawrence Avenue) – St. Lawrence, Boyertown	Western terminus of PA 562
Exeter Township	7.285	11.724	US 422 east (Perkiomen Avenue)	Interchange; access to eastbound US 422 and from westbound US 422; eastern terminus
1.000 mi = 1.609 km; 1.000 km = 0.621 mi: Incomplete access
