= Pennsylvania's 11th Senate district =

American legislative district

Pennsylvania's 11th State Senate district
Senator
Judy Schwank; D–Reading
- Population (2021): 263,931

Pennsylvania State Senate District 11 includes parts of Berks County. It is currently represented by Democrat Judy Schwank.

== District profile ==
The district includes the following areas:

- Adamstown (Berks County portion)
- Alsace Township
- Cumru Township
- Exeter Township
- Fleetwood
- Kenhorst
- Kutztown
- Laureldale
- Lower Alsace Township
- Lyons
- Maxatawny Township
- Mohnton
- Mount Penn
- Muhlenberg Township
- Oley Township
- Reading
- Richmond Township
- Ruscombmanor Township
- Shillington
- Sinking Spring
- Spring Township
- St. Lawrence
- West Reading
- Wyomissing

== Senators ==
Representative	Party	Years	District home	Note
William Gilliland	Democratic-Republican	1809 – 1820		
James McSherry	Federalist	1813 – 1816		Pennsylvania State Representative from 1807 to 1812, 1824 to 1830, 1834 and 1835. U.S. Representative for Pennsylvania's 5th congressional district from 1821 to 1823.
Charles A. Barnitz	Federalist	1815 – 1818		U.S. Representative for Pennsylvania's 11th congressional district from 1833 to 1835
Frederick Eichelberger	Democratic-Republican	1819 – 1822		
Jonah Brewster	Republican	1821 – 1824		
John Ryon, Jr.	Democratic-Republican	1825 – 1830		
Samuel McKean	Democratic	1829 – 1830		Pennsylvania State Representative from 1815 to 1819. U.S. Representative for Pennsylvania's 9th congressional district from 1823 to 1829. U.S. Senator for Pennsylvania from 1833 to 1839
Reuben Wilber	Jackson Democrat	1831 – 1834		
Almon Heath Read	Democratic	1833 – 1838		Pennsylvania State Representative from 1827 to 1832. U.S. Representative for Pennsylvania's 17th congressional district from 1842 to 1843. U.S. Representative for Pennsylvania's 12th congressional district from 1843 to 1844
Luther Kidder	Democratic	1843 – 1844		
Gordon Fowler Mason	Democratic	1847 – 1848		
Thomas Erskine Carson	Whig	1851 – 1854		Pennsylvania State Senator for the 18th district from 1845 to 1848
John Wallace Guernsey	Democratic	1851 – 1852		
David Mellinger	Whig	1853 – 1856		
George W. Brewer	Democratic	1857 – 1858		Pennsylvania State Senator for the 18th district from 1859 to 1860
Glenni William Scofield	Republican	1859 – 1860		Pennsylvania State Representative from 1849 to 1851. Pennsylvania State Senator for the 19th district from 1857 to 1858. U.S. Representative for Pennsylvania's 19th congressional district from 1863 to 1873. U.S. Representative for Pennsylvania's at-large congressional district from 1873 to 1875
Isaac Benson	Republican	1859 – 1862		
George Landon	Republican	1863 – 1868		Pennsylvania State Senator for the 9th district from 1859 to 1862
William J. Turrell	Republican	1865 – 1866		Pennsylvania State Senator for the 9th district from 1863 to 1864
Peter M. Osterhout	Republican	1869 – 1870		
Edwin Albright	Democratic	1871 – 1876		
Daniel Ermentrout	Democratic	1875 – 1888		Pennsylvania State Senator for the 1st district from 1873 to 1874. U.S. Representative for Pennsylvania's 8th congressional district from 1881 to 1889. U.S. Representative for Pennsylvania's 9th congressional district from 1897 to 1899
Edward Hertz Shearer	Democratic	1881 – 1884		
Frank R. Brunner	Democratic	1885 – 1888		
Henry Dickinson Green	Democratic	1889 – 1896		Pennsylvania State Representative for the Berks County district from 1883 to 1886. U.S. Representative for Pennsylvania's 9th congressional district from 1899 to 1903
Edwin M. Herbst	Democratic	1901 – 1916		
George Washington Sassaman	Democratic	1917 – 1920		
James E. Norton	Republican	1921 – 1934		
Frank W. Ruth	Democratic	1935 – 1960		
Gus Yatron	Democratic	1961 – 1968		Pennsylvania State Representative for the Berks County district from 1957 to 1959. U.S. Representative for Pennsylvania's 6th congressional district from 1969 to 1993
Robert R. Gerhart, Jr.	Democratic	1969 – 1972		Pennsylvania State Representative for the 126th district from 1967 to 1968
Michael O'Pake	Democratic	1973 – 2010		Pennsylvania State Representative for the 126th district from 1969 to 1972. Democratic Whip of the Pennsylvania Senate from 2001 to 2010
Judy Schwank	Democratic	2011 – present	Ruscombmanor	Member of the Berks County Board of Commissioners from 2000 to 2008

== Recent election results ==
PA Senate election, 2024
Party	Candidate	Votes	%
Democratic	Judy Schwank (incumbent)	63,935	58.6
Republican	Lisha L Rowe	45,000	41.31
Total votes		108,935	100.0
Democratic hold			

PA Senate election, 2020
Party	Candidate	Votes	%
Democratic	Judy Schwank (incumbent)	64,011	58.6
Republican	Annette Baker	45,205	41.4
Total votes		109,216	100.0
Democratic hold			

PA Senate election, 2016
Party	Candidate	Votes	%
Democratic	Judy Schwank (incumbent)	98,370	100
Total votes		98,370	100.0
Democratic hold			

PA Senate election, 2012
Party	Candidate	Votes	%
Democratic	Judy Schwank (incumbent)	63,796	64.4
Republican	Karen Mogel	35,318	35.6
Total votes		99,114	100.0
Democratic hold			

11th Senatorial District special election, 2011
Party	Candidate	Votes	%
Democratic	Judy Schwank	20,220	57.7
Republican	Larry Medaglia	14,832	42.3
Total votes		35,052	100.0
Democratic hold			
