= Pennsylvania House of Representatives, District 126 =

American legislative district

Pennsylvania's 126th State House of Representatives district
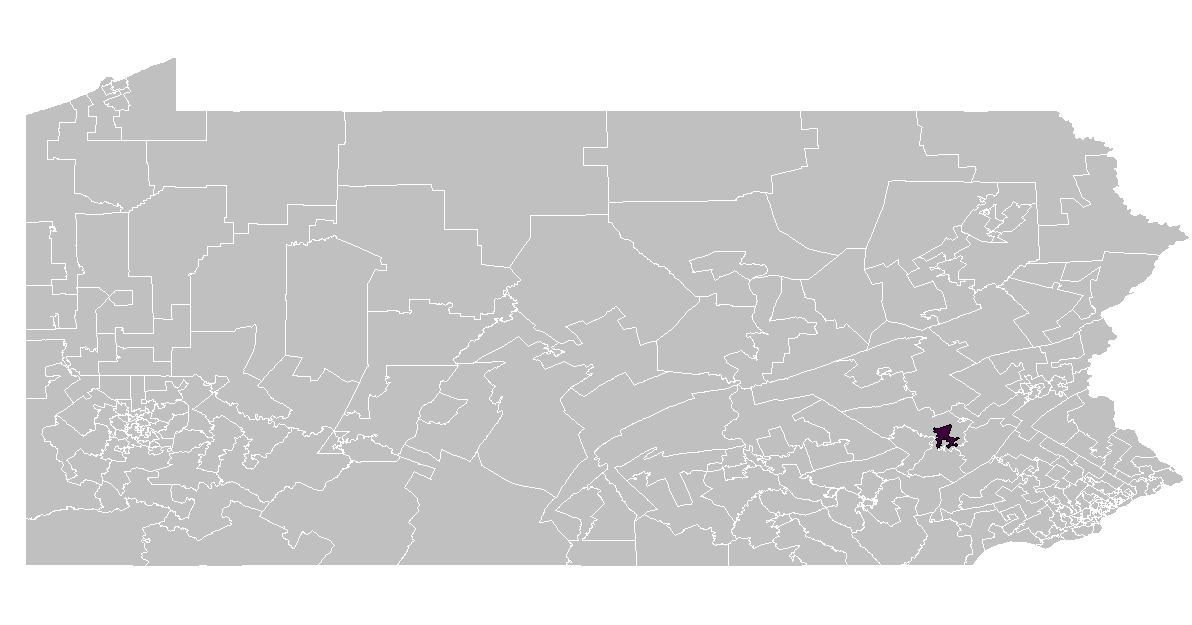
Representative
Jacklyn Rusnock; D–Muhlenberg Township

The 126th Pennsylvania House of Representatives District is located in Berks County and includes the following areas:

- Laureldale
- Lower Alsace Township
- Mount Penn
- Muhlenberg Township
- Reading (PART)
  - Ward 06 [PART, Division 03]
  - Ward 14 [PART, Division 06]
  - Ward 15 [PART, Divisions 02, 06 and 07]
  - Ward 17 [PART, Divisions 05, 07 and 08]
  - Ward 18 [PART, Divisions 01 and 04]
  - Ward 19
- St. Lawrence
- West Reading

== Representatives ==
Representative	Party	Years	District home	Note
Prior to 1969, seats were apportioned by county.
Michael O'Pake	Democrat	1969 – 1972	Reading	Elected to the Pennsylvania State Senate
Harold J. Stahl, Jr.	Republican	1973 – 1976		
Harold L. Brown	Democrat	1977 – 1982		
Paul J. Angstadt	Republican	1983 – 1992		
Dante Santoni, Jr.	Democrat	1993 – 2012	Reading	
Mark Rozzi	Democrat	2013 – 2024	Temple	Served as Speaker of the Pennsylvania House of Representatives
Jacklyn Rusnock	Democrat	2024 – elected	Temple	

== Recent election results ==
PA House election, 2022: Pennsylvania House of Representatives, District 126
Party	Candidate	Votes	%
Democratic	Mark Rozzi	11,613	63.98
Republican	James Daniel Oswald	6,539	36.02
Total votes		18,152	100.00
Democratic hold			
