= John Lutz (disambiguation) =

John Lutz may refer to:

- John Lutz (born 1973), American actor, comedian, and screenwriter
- John Lutz (mystery writer) (1939–2021), American writer
- John F. Lutz Furniture Co. & Funerary, St. Lawrence, Berks County, Pennsylvania
