= Mark Rozzi =

Speaker of the Pennsylvania House of Representatives (2023)

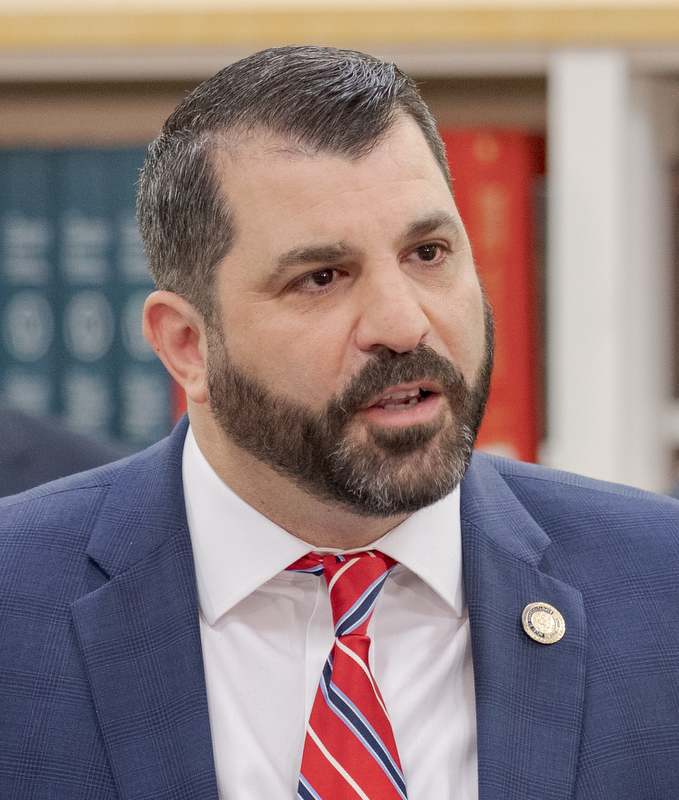

142nd Speaker of the Pennsylvania House of Representatives
- In office January 3, 2023 – February 28, 2023
- Preceded by: Bryan Cutler
- Succeeded by: Joanna McClinton

Member of the Pennsylvania House of Representatives from the 126th district
- In office January 1, 2013 – November 30, 2024
- Preceded by: Dante Santoni
- Succeeded by: Jacklyn Rusnock

Personal details
- Born: April 30, 1971 (age 55) Reading, Pennsylvania, U.S.
- Party: Democratic
- Other political affiliations: Independent Democrat (2023) (Note: During his tenure as speaker, Rozzi remained a registered Democrat but did not caucus with the party.)
- Spouse: Jacklyn Rusnock (divorced)
- Children: 1
- Education: Kutztown University (BA)
- Website: Campaign website

Mark Lucio Rozzi (born April 30, 1971) is an American politician who served as the 140th Speaker of the Pennsylvania House of Representatives from January to February 2023. A member of the Democratic Party he represented the 126th district from 2013 to 2024.

== Background ==
Rozzi was born on April 30, 1971, in Reading, Pennsylvania. He graduated from Muhlenberg High School in 1989 and earned a bachelor of arts degree in political science from Kutztown University. Rozzi owned and operated his family’s construction business before selling it in 2018. Rozzi is divorced and has one daughter.

== Pennsylvania House of Representatives ==
Rozzi was first elected to represent the 126th district in the Pennsylvania House of Representatives in 2012. He was subsequently elected to five more terms.

During his first term, Rozzi introduced a bill that would have legalized medically assisted death. The bill stemmed from Rozzi watching his father die of a terminal brain tumor, but it was never voted on.

In 2022, Rozzi was one of just four House Democrats who voted in favor of a ban on transgender athletes participating in youth sports.

On October 21, 2023, Rozzi announced that he would not seek re-election to his state house seat, opting instead to run for Pennsylvania Auditor General. He later dropped out of the race in January 2024, citing mental health issues stemming from sexual abuse as a child.

=== Relief for survivors of sex abuse ===
Rozzi was sexually abused and raped by a priest in the Roman Catholic Church as a child. Making it easier for victims to bring charges and file lawsuits against the accused has been one of his political objectives, as well as the reason why he ran for state representative after a friend abused by the same priest committed suicide. Following a grand jury report detailing of cover-up of church sex abuse, Rozzi led an effort to give relief to survivors via new legislation. In 2019, Governor Tom Wolf signed into a law package of legislation that removed temporal constraints on filing charges against perpetrators of sexual abuse. Amidst the package of reforms was an amendment to the Pennsylvania Constitution which would retroactively repeal the statute of limitations on sexual abuse. The amendment had to be approved by two successive legislative sessions before being put forward in a referendum. However, a 2021 clerical error by Wolf's administration caused the final passage of the amendment to be pushed back even further.

=== Speaker of the House ===
On January 3, 2023, Rozzi was elected as Speaker of the Pennsylvania House of Representatives, following speculation and disputes over which party controlled the legislature; in the 2022 election, Democrats won a majority of seats, but three vacancies technically gave Republican a 101-99 majority. Rozzi was nominated by Republican Representative Jim Gregory as a compromise candidate, earning bipartisan support. Following his election, Rozzi said he would govern as an independent and not caucus with either party. However, according to private conversations with fellow Democrats, Rozzi would not change his party registration. His private comments saying he would remain in the Democratic Party caused controversy with the Republicans who voted him for speaker, including Gregory, who said Rozzi should resign. According to Gregory and others, Rozzi repeatedly told them he would leave the Democratic Party and officially register as an independent should he be elected speaker.

As Speaker, Rozzi said his first priority would be to finally pass the amendment to Pennsylvania's constitution to allow victims of sexual abuse a two year gap in the statute of limitations for them to sue their abusers. Governor Wolf called a special session of the legislature so such the amendment could be passed the required second time. However, Republicans in the State Senate combined the amendment on sexual abuse survivors with two others to require voter ID and regulatory reform. Rozzi opposed the addition of the two other amendments and pushed for legislation making the sex abuse survivors amendment separate from the other two. He was successful on February 24, with an amendment solely concerning victim relief passing 161-40. However, State Senate Majority Leader Joe Pittman declined to bring the singular amendment to a vote.

On February 28, Rozzi resigned as Speaker of the House and returned to the Democratic Caucus.

== Electoral history ==
2012 Pennsylvania House of Representatives Democratic primary election, District 126
Party	Candidate	Votes	%
Democratic	Mark Rozzi	2,820	58.82
Democratic	Frank B. Denbowski	1,592	33.21
Democratic	John A. Delcollo	381	7.95
Write-in		1	0.02
Total votes		4,794	100.00

2012 Pennsylvania House of Representatives election, District 126
Party	Candidate	Votes	%
Democratic	Mark Rozzi	16,811	70.21
Republican	James R. Billman	7,119	29.73
Write-in		13	0.05
Total votes		23,943	100.00

2014 Pennsylvania House of Representatives election, District 126
Party	Candidate	Votes	%
Democratic	Mark Rozzi	10,687	99.46
Write-in		58	0.54
Total votes		10,745	100.00

2016 Pennsylvania House of Representatives election, District 126
Party	Candidate	Votes	%
Democratic	Mark Rozzi	20,479	99.79
Write-in		43	0.21
Total votes		20,522	100.00

2018 Pennsylvania House of Representatives election, District 126
Party	Candidate	Votes	%
Democratic	Mark Rozzi	15,291	99.6
Write-in		62	0.4
Total votes		15,353	100.0

2020 Pennsylvania House of Representatives election, District 126
Party	Candidate	Votes	%
Democratic	Mark Rozzi	18,508	67.30
Republican	James D. Oswald	8,961	32.59
Write-in		30	0.11
Total votes		27,499	100.00

2022 Pennsylvania House of Representatives election, District 126
Party	Candidate	Votes	%
Democratic	Mark Rozzi	11,613	63.98
Republican	James Daniel Oswald	6,539	36.02
Total votes		18,152	100.00

== Notes ==
Pennsylvania House of Representatives
Preceded by Dante Santoni	Member of the Pennsylvania House of Representatives from the 126th district 2013–2024	Succeeded by Jacklyn Rusnock
Incumbent
Political offices
Preceded by Bryan Cutler	Speaker of the Pennsylvania House of Representatives; 2023	Succeeded by Joanna McClinton
