= Robert Gerhart =

American politician (1920–2021)

Robert R. Gerhart, Jr.

Member of the Pennsylvania Senate from the 11th district
- In office January 7, 1969 – November 30, 1972
- Preceded by: Gus Yatron
- Succeeded by: Michael O'Pake
- Constituency: Berks County

Member of the Pennsylvania House of Representatives from the 126th district district
- In office January 2, 1967 – November 30, 1968

Personal details
- Born: December 21, 1920 Robesonia, Pennsylvania, U.S.
- Died: August 23, 2021 (aged 100) Tucson, Arizona, U.S.
- Party: Democratic
- Spouse(s): Lillian S. Gerhart (deceased); Joan Marie Gerhart
- Children: 3
- Education: Albright College
- Occupation: Retired

Robert R. Gerhart, Jr. (December 21, 1920 – August 23, 2021) was an American politician who served as a Democratic member of the Pennsylvania State Senate for the 11th district from 1969 to 1972. He also served as a member of the Pennsylvania House of Representatives for the 126th district from 1967 to 1968.

== Early life and education ==
He was born in Robesonia, Pennsylvania to Robert R. and Mae R. Moyer Gerhart. He attended Robesonia High School and graduated from Albright College in 1941. He served in the U.S. Army during World War II from 1945 to 1946.

== Business career ==
He worked as a news reporter for The Reading Times from 1938 to 1948. He was the owner of the Diamond Beach Resort in Wildwood, New Jersey from 1966 to 1986. He was the owner of a public relations company named Roberts & Company. He published the New Era Union journal in Reading, Pennsylvania and was one of the early pioneers in the Pennsylvania cable TV business as the founder of Suburban TV Cable Company.

== Political career ==
Gerhart worked as a campaign manager for U.S. Congressman George M. Rhodes. He was a member of the Robesonia Borough Council from 1946 to 1956. He served as a member of the Pennsylvania House of Representatives for the 126th district from 1967 to 1968 and the Pennsylvania Senate for the 11th district from 1969 to 1972.

== Personal life ==
Gerhart and his wife Lillian Gerhart donated $1.5 million to Albright College in Reading, Pennsylvania to establish the Bob and Lillian Gerhart Chair in Communications.

He died in Tucson, Arizona, in August 2021 at the age of 100.
