= Jacklyn Rusnock =

American politician from Pennsylvania

Member of the Pennsylvania House of Representatives from the 126th district
- Incumbent
- Assumed office December 1, 2024

Personal details
- Party: Democratic

Jacklyn Rusnock is an American politician that represents the 126th district of the Pennsylvania House of Representatives as a Democrat since 2024.

== Early life ==
Rusnock earned a degree in dental hygiene from West Virginia University and worked as a dental hygienist before becoming a dental occupations teacher at Reading Muhlenberg Career and Technology Center, a vocational school. At the time of her election she coached the softball team at Muhlenberg High School and was a member of the Muhlenberg school board. Rusnock had been married to Mark Rozzi for 25 years but the pair filed for a divorce. When Rozzi declined to seek reelection to run for Pennsylvania Auditor General unsuccessfully in 2024 Rusnock stood in the Democratic primaries.

== Representative ==
Rusnock was endorsed by her ex-husband and said that being elected to the house had been a "dream." Rusnock defeated Republican James Oswald 13,834 votes to Oswald’s 10,944.

Pennsylvania House of Representatives
Preceded by Mark Rozzi	Member of the Pennsylvania House of Representatives from the 126th district 2024–present	Succeeded by
