= Daniel Ermentrout =

American politician (1837–1899)

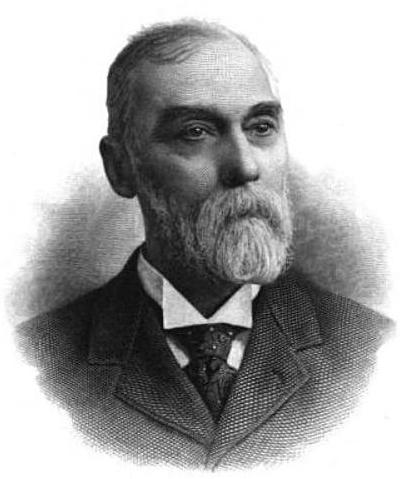

Member of the U.S. House of Representatives from Pennsylvania
- In office March 4, 1897 – September 17, 1899
- Preceded by: Constantine Jacob Erdman
- Succeeded by: Henry Dickinson Green
- Constituency: 9th district
- In office March 4, 1881 – March 3, 1889
- Preceded by: Hiester Clymer
- Succeeded by: William Mutchler
- Constituency: 8th district

Member of the Pennsylvania Senate from the 1st district
- In office 1873–1874
- Preceded by: James B. Alexander
- Succeeded by: George Handy Smith

Member of the Pennsylvania Senate from the 11th district
- In office 1875–1888

Personal details
- Born: Daniel Ermentrout; January 24, 1837 Reading, Pennsylvania, U.S.
- Died: September 17, 1899 (aged 62) Reading, Pennsylvania, U.S.
- Resting place: Charles Evans Cemetery
- Party: Democratic
- Education: Franklin & Marshall College

Daniel Ermentrout (January 24, 1837 – September 17, 1899) was an American politician from Pennsylvania who served as a Democratic member of the U.S. House of Representatives for Pennsylvania's 8th congressional district from 1881 to 1889 and for Pennsylvania's 9th congressional district from 1897 to 1899. He also served as a member of the Pennsylvania State Senate for the 1st district from 1873 to 1874 and the 11th district from 1875 to 1888.

== Early life and education ==
Ermentrout was born in Reading, Pennsylvania to William and Julia (Silvis) Ermentrout. He attended Franklin and Marshall College in Lancaster, Pennsylvania, and the Elmwood Institute in Norristown, Pennsylvania. He studied law, was admitted to the bar in 1859 and commenced practice in Reading.

== Political career ==
He was elected district attorney in 1862 and served for three years. He was solicitor for the city of Reading from 1867 to 1870 and a member of the board of school control of Reading from 1868 to 1876. He was a delegate to the Democratic National Conventions in 1868 and 1880. He was chairman of the standing committee of Berks County, Pennsylvania, in 1869, 1872, and 1873. He served as a member of the Pennsylvania State Senate for the 1st district from 1873 to 1874 and the 11th district from 1875 to 1887. He was appointed in October 1877 by Governor John F. Hartranft as a member of the Pennsylvania Statuary Commission.

=== Congress ===
Ermentrout was elected as a Democrat to the Forty-seventh and to the three succeeding Congresses. He was an unsuccessful candidate for renomination in 1888. He was a delegate to the Democratic State conventions from 1895 to 1899. He was again elected to the Fifty-fifth and Fifty-sixth Congresses.

== Death ==
He served in Congress until his death in Reading due to the effects of a choking incident in 1899. He was buried in Charles Evans Cemetery.

== Personal life ==
Ermentrout was married to Adelaide Louise Metzger.

== See also ==
- List of members of the United States Congress who died in office (1790–1899)

== Sources ==
- United States Congress. "Daniel Ermentrout (id: E000205)". Biographical Directory of the United States Congress.
- The Political Graveyard

Pennsylvania State Senate
Preceded by James B. Alexander	Member of the Pennsylvania Senate, 1st district 1873-1874	Succeeded by George Handy Smith
Preceded by	Member of the Pennsylvania Senate, 11th district 1875-1888	Succeeded by
U.S. House of Representatives
Preceded by Hiester Clymer	Member of the U.S. House of Representatives from Pennsylvania's 8th congressional district 1881–1889	Succeeded by William Mutchler
Preceded by Constantine J. Erdman	Member of the U.S. House of Representatives from Pennsylvania's 9th congressional district 1897–1899	Succeeded by Henry D. Green
