= Doug Clemens =

American baseball player (born 1939)

- Outfielder
- Born: June 9, 1939 (age 87); Leesport, Pennsylvania, U.S.
- Batted: Left Threw: Right

MLB debut
- October 2, 1960, for the St. Louis Cardinals

Last MLB appearance
- September 27, 1968, for the Philadelphia Phillies

MLB statistics
- Batting average: .229
- Home runs: 12
- Runs batted in: 88
- Stats at Baseball Reference

Teams
- St. Louis Cardinals (1960–1964); Chicago Cubs (1964–1965); Philadelphia Phillies (1966–1968)

Douglas Horace Clemens (born June 9, 1939) is an American former professional baseball outfielder, who played in Major League Baseball (MLB) from 1960–1968 for the Chicago Cubs, Philadelphia Phillies and St. Louis Cardinals. During Clemens’ playing days, he stood 6 feet (1.8 m) tall, weighing 180 pounds (82 kg). He batted left-handed and threw right-handed.

== Early life ==
Born in Leesport, Berks County, Pennsylvania, in 1939, Clemens attended Muhlenberg High School, lettering in both football and baseball, while under the tutelage of his own father, Head Coach Lloyd “Scoop” Clemens (himself, a Phillies scout). A highly-recruited halfback, he (young Clemens) played collegiately in Jim Brown’s footsteps, at Syracuse University. While on a full athletic (gridiron) scholarship, Clemens suffered a severe knee injury, early on in Fall, 1957; however, the Orangemen transferred his scholarship to the diamond, where he played first base, lettering in baseball in both 1959 and 1960. Following his Junior year, Clemens turned pro, signing with the Cardinals.

== Baseball career ==
A pinch-hitting specialist for most of his MLB career, Clemens’ main claim to fame stems from the June 15, 1964, trade that brought future Hall of Famer Lou Brock to the Cardinals.

That spring, Clemens broke camp with the Cards. In early-season action, he tallied 33 games played, while hitting .205, with six walks, and 16 strikeouts. On June 15, the Cardinals traded Clemens, Bobby Shantz, and Ernie Broglio to the Chicago Cubs, in exchange for Jack Spring, Paul Toth, and (although not-yet-evident) Cooperstown-bound outfielder Brock.

Clemens continued in platoon and pinch-hitting roles until retiring as a Phillie, following a 1968 season, most of which was spent with their Triple-A San Diego Padres (PCL) club.

During his nine-year MLB career, including the full seasons of 1964 through 1967, Clemens collected 211 hits, with 34 doubles seven triples, and 12 home runs. He batted .229 and was credited with 88 runs batted in (RBI).
