= Harold L. Brown =

American politician

Member of the Pennsylvania House of Representatives from the 126th district
- In office 1977–1982
- Preceded by: Harold Stahl
- Succeeded by: Paul Angstadt

Personal details
- Born: August 21, 1946 (age 79) Reading, Pennsylvania
- Party: Democratic

Harold L. Brown (born August 21, 1946) is a former Democratic member of the Pennsylvania House of Representatives.
