= Henry D. Green =

American politician

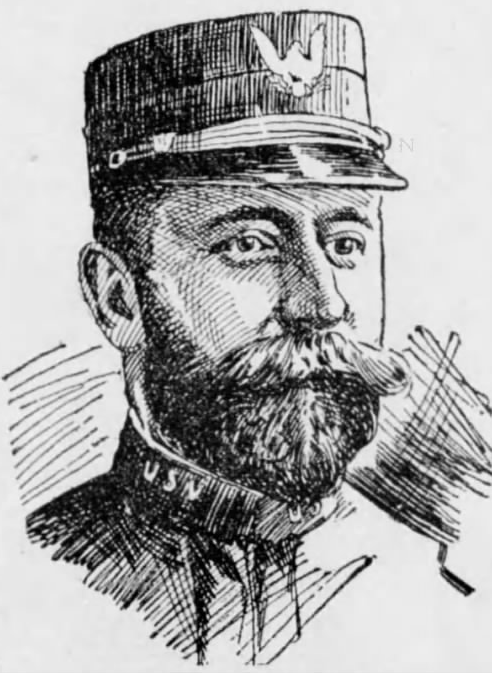
- An illustration of Green in 1899 in The Philadelphia Times

Member of the U.S. House of Representatives from Pennsylvania's 9th district
- In office November 7, 1899 – March 3, 1903
- Preceded by: Daniel Ermentrout
- Succeeded by: Henry B. Cassel

Member of the Pennsylvania House of Representatives for the Berks County district
- In office 1883-1886

Member of the Pennsylvania Senate for the 11th district
- In office 1889-1896
- Preceded by: Frank R. Brunner
- Succeeded by: Edwin M. Herbst

Personal details
- Born: May 3, 1857 Reading, Pennsylvania, US
- Died: December 29, 1929 (aged 72) Reading, Pennsylvania, US
- Party: Democratic
- Education: Yale University

Military service
- Allegiance: United States
- Branch/service: United States Army
- Rank: Captain
- Battles/wars: Spanish–American War

Henry Dickinson Green (May 3, 1857 – December 29, 1929) was an American politician who served as a Democratic member of the U.S. House of Representatives for Pennsylvania's 9th congressional district from 1899 to 1903.

== Early life and education ==
Henry D. Green was born in Reading, Pennsylvania. He attended the public schools, and graduated from Reading High School in 1872 and Yale College in 1877. He studied law, was admitted to the Berks County, Pennsylvania bar in 1879, and commenced practice in Reading.

== Career ==
He was a member of the Pennsylvania State House of Representatives for the Berks County district from 1883 to 1886. He served as a member of the Pennsylvania State Senate for the 11th district from 1889 to 1896. During the Spanish–American War, he served as captain of Company G, Ninth Regiment, Pennsylvania Volunteers. He was a delegate to the 1900 Democratic National Convention.

Green was elected as a Democrat to the Fifty-sixth Congress to fill the vacancy caused by the death of Daniel Ermentrout. He was reelected to the Fifty-seventh Congress. He was not a candidate for renomination in 1902. He worked as editor of the Reading Telegram from 1903 to 1912 and of the Reading Times from 1911 to 1913. He resumed the practice of law in Reading, and was also admitted to the bar in Texas in 1920. He became engaged in oil operation in the Mid-continent Oil Field. He died in Reading in 1929. He was interred in Arlington National Cemetery.

== Notes ==
Pennsylvania House of Representatives
Preceded by	Member of the Pennsylvania House of Representatives for the Berks County district 1883-1886	Succeeded by
Pennsylvania State Senate
Preceded by Frank R. Brunner	Member of the Pennsylvania Senate for the 11th district 1889-1896	Succeeded by Edwin M. Herbst
U.S. House of Representatives
Preceded by Daniel Ermentrout	Member of the U.S. House of Representatives from Pennsylvania's 9th congressional district 1899–1903	Succeeded by Henry B. Cassel
