= Hessian Camp =

18th Century Pennsylvania POW Camp

- Location: Mount Penn, Pennsylvania, Reading, PA
- Status: Inactive
- Population: 1100 (approximate peak population in 1781)
- Opened: 1776
- Closed: 1783

Notable prisoners
- Sgt.-Maj. Samuel Vaupel

Hessian Camp also known as Mt. Penn Hessian Camp was a large prisoner of war camp located in the city of Reading, on Mt Penn during the American Revolutionary War. The camp was active from 1776 to 1783 and held up to 1100 prisoners at its most active point in 1781.

== Background ==
The camp was created following the Battle of Trenton on December 26, 1776, to hold Hessian and British prisoners captured during the battle.

It was located originally on the banks of the Schuylkill River, where the prisoners of war were housed in huts along the riverbank. These huts were not properly built, and this caused many problems that would later affect the camp's operation.

During the winter of 1776–77, sickness spread widely among the prisoners and a large number died. These dead were buried at a burial site located at Potter's Field, in mass graves where many men were buried after the waves of sickness swept through the camp.

Following the Battle of Saratoga, it was announced that a new shipment of prisoners was to be brought to the Reading camp. This angered the people of the city, and they demanded that a safer and more secured camp be built further away from the city.

The camp was soon relocated to the southern slopes of the nearby Mt. Penn, where a new, larger prison camp would be constructed with proper barracks and better placement, to ensure safety to the people of Reading, but also to provide more proper shelter for the prison population, which had originally numbered around 1000 (comparable to the population of the city of Reading at the time) prior to the winter flu outbreak in 1776–77.

This new campsite, a 12-acre patch of land with a freshwater spring and bountiful lumber, was soon established and huts were constructed to house the remaining prisoners from the Schuylkill camps.

In 1780, the population of the camp was only about 100 people, both prisoners and personnel, following the devastation from a flu outbreak that ravaged the camp in 1777. This swiftly changed when in 1781, a large group of captured Hessians and British, numbering 1050 individuals, were brought to Hessian Camp. The prisoners arrived in Reading, guarded by the York County Militia and a few other local militias to ensure a safe escort to the camp.

On Christmas Day in 1781, a group of prisoners fled the camp after being harassed by a small group of Indians. A court martial was filed, but no one was punished.

In August 1783, the camp was officially de-established, and the prisoners currently held there were taken to prisons in Lancaster, escorted by local militias.

== Present ==
Today, the camp no longer exists, and all the barracks have since been reclaimed by the elements. The last account of structures from the camp on Mt. Penn was in 1840. In 1976, for the United States Bicentennial, the Carpenters and Joiners of America erected multiple reconstruction cabins and huts at the site of the camp. These reconstructions were heavily vandalized and no longer stand. The historic location of the prison is now a small community, aptly named Hessian Camp, PA. A Pennsylvania Historical Marker was dedicated near the site of the old camp in October 1949.
