= Harold Stahl =

American politician

H. John Stahl, Jr.

Member of the Pennsylvania House of Representatives from the 126th district
- In office 1973–1976
- Preceded by: Michael O'Pake
- Succeeded by: Harold L. Brown

Personal details
- Born: November 16, 1944 (age 81) Baltimore, Maryland
- Party: Republican

Harold John Stahl, Jr. (born November 16, 1944) is a former Republican member of the Pennsylvania House of Representatives.
