= Paul Angstadt =

American politician (1939–2022)

Paul J. Angstadt

Member of the Pennsylvania House of Representatives from the 126th district
- In office 1983–1992
- Preceded by: Harold L. Brown
- Succeeded by: Dante Santoni

Mayor of Reading, Pennsylvania
- In office January 1, 1996 – January 3, 2000
- Preceded by: Warren Haggerty
- Succeeded by: Joseph Eppihimer

Personal details
- Born: February 12, 1939 Reading, Pennsylvania
- Died: June 20, 2022 (aged 83) Berks County, Pennsylvania
- Party: Republican

Paul J. Angstadt (February 12, 1939 – June 20, 2022) was an American politician and member of the Republican who served in the Pennsylvania House of Representatives from 1983 to 1992.

== Biography ==
Angstadt was elected Mayor of Reading, Pennsylvania in 1995, defeating Democratic state Rep. Thomas Caltagirone in the mayoral election. He was the first Republican elected as Reading's mayor since Eugene Shirk won re-election to a second term in 1971. Angstadt became Reading's first strong mayor under the city's new home rule form of government, which took effect on January 1, 1996, the day of Angstadt's inauguration.

On January 25, 1999, Mayor Angstadt announced that he would not seek re-election to a second term. He was succeeded by Democrat Joseph Eppihimer.

== Death ==
On June 20, 2022, Angstadt died at the age of 83 in Berks County.
