= Penn Street Bridge =

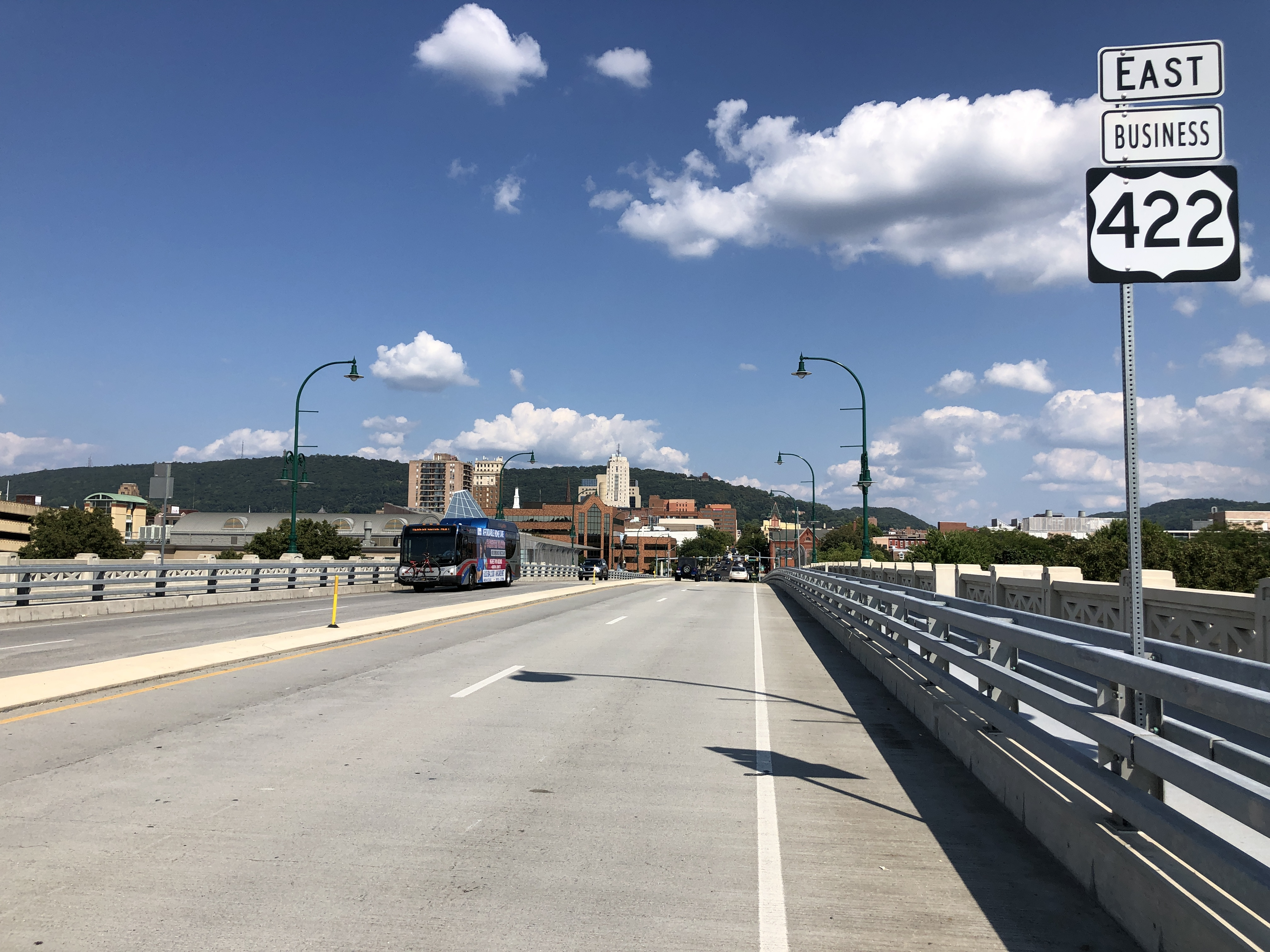
- Deck of Penn Street Bridge in Reading, Pennsylvania, August 2022
- Coordinates: 40°20′07″N 75°56′12″W
- Carries: 4 lanes of Penn Street
- Crosses: Schuylkill River
- Locale: Reading, Pennsylvania
- Other name(s): Penn Street Viaduct "Gateway to Reading"
- Maintained by: Pennsylvania Department of Transportation (PennDOT)

Characteristics
- Design: Open-spandrel concrete arch
- Total length: 1,337 feet (408 m)
- Width: 80 feet (24 m)
- Height: 36 feet (11 m)
- Longest span: 110 feet (34 m)
- No. of spans: 5 Main Spans and 22 Approach Spans

History
- Architect: Benjamin Herman Davis
- Constructed by: L. H. Focht & Son
- Opened: November 14, 1913; 112 years ago

Statistics
- Daily traffic: 34,000

The Penn Street Bridge, also known as the Penn Street Viaduct, is a historic bridge crossing the Schuylkill River into Reading, Pennsylvania, the largest city in Berks County and fourth-largest city in the state. The bridge is considered to be the primary gateway to downtown Reading, leading directly onto Penn Street, the main thoroughfare of the city. The opposite end of the bridge leads into the borough of West Reading and connects with an interchange onto the West Shore Bypass section of U.S. Route 422. As a result of the bridge's prominent location, it has an average daily traffic volume of nearly 34,000. Constructed in 1913, the bridge is one of the oldest examples in the region of an open-spandrel concrete arch bridge, and it retains good historic integrity including original ornate concrete railings; it was determined eligible for listing in the National Register of Historic Places in 2007 and reevaluated in 2019.

== History ==
=== Before the bridge (before 1816) ===
Prior to the presence of any local bridge crossing the Schuylkill River, people would ford (cross) the river by foot or by using a vehicle with large wheels at shallow spots of the river. There was also a ferry service that ran from one side of the river to the other.

In 1796, a movement to build a bridge across the river took hold and the Berks County government voted to build a stone bridge over the Schuylkill at Penn Street. With the initial $32,000 provided by the county being inadequate, a lottery scheme was authorized in an attempt to raise $60,000 for the bridge's construction. This scheme failed and the project was canceled in 1798, with the funds raised via the lottery being returned. Another petition was brought forward in 1801 asking for the erection of a wooden bridge upon stone piers in the same area. This was approved and the county appropriated $16,000 for the project.

The county entered an agreement with Obediah Osborn of York County to build the bridge; however, in 1804, after spending $30,000 and only constructing four stone pillars, Osborn abandoned the contract, assigned all his property to the county, and left the State. Following these events, and despite the county government approving further work on the bridge following another petition by county residents in January 1805, the site of the proposed bridge was left abandoned for nearly a decade, causing the masonry of the pillars, as well as the timber on hand, to suffer from neglect.

In the 1810s, work began on two canals - the Schuylkill Canal and the Union Canal - to allow for the cheap and efficient transport of cargo between the cities of Philadelphia, Reading, and Harrisburg. This resulted in the Schuylkill River being dammed for canal boats, resulting in the new need of a bridge to cross the river. By legislative enactment in 1812 and 1814, the Berks County Commissioners were given permission to resume construction on the bridge. The commissioners formed a contract with Lewis Wernwag and Joseph Johnson to build the bridge out of wood upon the stone pillars erected previously by Osborn.

=== Original three bridges (1816-1911) ===
==== The wooden covered bridges (1816-1884) ====
In January 1816, although technically still under construction, the original wooden covered bridge was deemed complete enough for it to be opened for public travel. Construction on the bridge was officially completed in 1818, costing approximately $50,000 in total. The bridge was well constructed and contained various external ornamentations, including two wood-carved effigies symbolizing commerce and agriculture being placed upon the pediments at the opposing ends of the bridge. A toll was initially charged for the bridge, with those traversing by foot paying one cent each while animals and animal-drawn vehicles paid more.

Throughout the following decades, a series of floods caused a great amount of damage to bridges crossing the Schuylkill River throughout Berks County, including the Penn Street Bridge. In January 1839, flooding along the river (up to 17 feet high) swept away the nearby Poplar Neck Bridge and severely damaging the nearby Lancaster Bridge; the Penn Street Bridge managed to withstand the force of the waters, but did suffer from minor damage due to canal boats hitting the structure as the water rose to within two feet of the bridge's floor. More considerable damage was caused by higher (19 feet) floods in January 1841 and in July 1850. In September 1850, a catastrophic twenty-five feet flood swept away the Penn Street Bridge and every other bridge across the Schuylkill River within Berks County, completely destroying the original Penn Street Bridge.

In 1851, legislation was passed authorizing the rebuilding of the bridges, and the county commissioners contracted Hoyer & Bitner to reconstruct the Penn Street Bridge at a cost of $17,000. This second bridge, another wooden covered bridge similar in style - although of a slightly updated design - to the first bridge, proved to be sturdier than the original bridge, as a twenty-three foot flood in October 1869 had caused no harm to the Penn Street Bridge, even as the nearby Lancaster and Poplar Neck bridges saw minor damage. In 1883, the total amount of money collected by tolls on the bridges crossing the Schuylkill River had exceeded the total cost of the bridges themselves; as such, all Berks County bridges over the Schuylkill became exempt from toll, and the Penn Street bridge was declared free (an earlier effort to get the bridge declared free had failed in 1848).

==== The steel bridge (1884-1911) ====
In 1884, the Pennsylvania Railroad Company, seeking to compete with the Reading Railroad, constructed the Schuylkill Branch alongside the Schuylkill River, part of which ran under the Penn Street Bridge. In order to facilitate right of way, and due to concerns that trains traveling below the wooden structure would ignite it, the company removed the wooden covered bridge and replaced it with a steel Pratt truss bridge. The total cost of the project was around $100,000, with the railroad company paying two-thirds of that amount and the Berks County government paying the remainder. This project also saw the eastern approach of the bridge get lengthened and elevated, making the eastern approach similar to that of the bridge today.

Construction of the steel truss bridge was completed in 1885. This bridge was primarily designed to accommodate the average amount of horse and buggy traffic expected in the late 1800s; however, an increasing amount of development to the west of the river, along with automobile traffic becoming more common towards the turn of the century, saw a considerable increase in the amount of strain placed on the bridge. In 1895, the Reading Traction Company sought to take advantage of the increased usage of the bridge by running trolley cars across it. The company, having received permission from the county government to lay tracks and run cars across the bridge, took minor steps to repair and strengthen the bridge for such use. These measures, however, proved inadequate in reducing the amount of stress placed on the bridge.

In the Spring of 1909, employees of the Reading Traction Company were making repairs to the tracks on the bridge when they noticed that the bridge's girders, or support beams, over the section of the bridge that crossed the Pennsylvania Railroad tracks had deteriorated to such an extent that it was unsafe to cross. The county government quickly took steps to replace the girders, yet rumors of the potential dangerous conditions of the bridge persisted. In August 1910, the county government ordered County Engineer Charles F. Sanders to investigate the bridge, which showed that the bridge was seriously overstressed and unsafe for high levels of use. The county subsequently restricted the bridge to ordinary highway traffic, banning trolley cars from crossing the bridge and placing watchmen at the bridge to monitor traffic and prevent overstraining. After having to close the bridge in September 1910 for minor repairs and adjustments, the bridge was reopened at its still-restricted capacity in October 1910. In January 1911, the construction of a reinforced concrete viaduct to replace the steel bridge was approved.

=== Constructing the current bridge (1911-1913) ===
After receiving approval to construct the bridge in January 1911, the Berks County Commissioners began holding a series of conferences involving officials from the City of Reading and the State Waterway Commission as well as corporate representatives from the Reading Traction Company, the Pennsylvania Railroad Company, the Philadelphia and Reading Railway Company, and the Schuylkill Navigation Company. The commissioners hired Benjamin Herman Davis of New York to work as a consulting engineer and designer, working alongside County Engineer Sanders and several other engineers to design the bridge. A tentative draft of the bridge was approved by the county commissioners in March 1911, and a final plan was adopted by city and county officials at a joint conference on April 28, 1911.

The final plan involved the laying of a sixty-foot street on both sides of the bridge's eastern approach, pushing back the property on the sides of the bridge leading into the city. The county paid for seventy-five percent of the two streets - including the compensation to the property owners, with the City of Reading paying for the remaining twenty-five percent. The final plan also involved raising Penn Street approximately eighteen inches at its intersection with Second Street, where the Easter approach of the bridge began. This required the relaying and re-macadamizing parts of Second Street as well as the replacing of gas and water pipes and sewers along parts of Second and Penn streets; the county agreed to pay the entire cost for this.

On July 25, 1911, the county awarded a contract to the Allentown Portland Cement Company in Evansville, Berks County to provide cement for the project. On September 14, 1911, the county awarded a contract to L. H. Focht & Son to build the bridge. Work on the bridge began on October 16, 1911.

The county issued $475,000 of bonds at 3.5% interest to secure funding for the bridge. The bonds were printed by the National Bank Note Company of Philadelphia and placed on sale at the Reading National Bank on March 15, 1912. Despite concerns of local officials that the bonds would not sell due to the deteriorating condition of the bond market at the time, the residents of Berks County - excited about the bridge project - bought the bonds more rapidly than the money was needed.

Although the construction was slower than expected, there were no major incidents to occur during the construction process. One source of delay was the difficulty in finding suitable foundations for the bridge pillars, with the construction crew boring thirty to thirty-five feet deeper in some areas than expected. As the bridge was designed to be much wider than the steel bridge it was replacing, arrangements were made to keep the old bridge in place until the southern third of the newer bridge was built, at which point a temporary floor was placed and one-third of the bridge - still under construction - was opened to traffic. This occurred on November 21, 1912, following which the old steel bridge was removed and construction proceeded on the remaining two-thirds of the bridge.

The bridge was officially opened on Friday, November 14, 1913. The first vehicle to cross the completed bridge was a trolley car starting from the east side at 5:14 PM, following which the bridge was opened to all traffic.

=== Since opening (1914-present) ===
The original roadway of the current bridge contained two standard gauge electric railway tracks used by the Reading Traction Company to provide trolley car service across the bridge. As busses replaced streetcars as the main vehicle of public transportation throughout Berks County, trolley usage declined and all trolley service within the county ceased on January 7, 1952. The tracks on the Penn Street Bridge were subsequently removed.

Minor renovations to the bridge were carried out in 1958 to allow for an interchange onto the West Shore Bypass section of U.S. Route 422 to join with the bridge. Around this time, the reticulated balustrades and outlooks on the sides of the bridge were closed due to deterioration.

Further renovations to the bridge were made in the 1970s, with the biggest change being the replacement of the gaslights and obelisks with ornamental electric lighting.

In 2013, the local community hosted a 100th birthday party for the bridge alongside the Schuylkill River. The party was attended by representatives from PennDOT, who brought supplies for children to build model bridges.

From 2016 to 2019, PennDOT led a $43 million renovation and rehabilitation project for the bridge. The project involved replacing the bridge's floor beams, repaving the roadway, and restoring the crumbling concrete railings. Designers used the original plans from 1911 during the project and focused heavily on preserving the bridge's original historic character. The project was done in stages that allowed for three of the bridge's four lanes to remain open at any given time, minimizing disruption to traffic and preventing greater congestion within the city street grid. The project narrowed each lane from thirteen feet wide to eleven feet wide to deter vehicles from speeding and to expand the shoulders to five feet wide each with bicycle-safe grates, allowing for the easy creation of bike lanes should the city wish to add them. The added barriers also protect the 7 feet wide sidewalks on both sides. Energy-efficient LED lighting was also added to the bridge, showcasing the open-spandrel arches and allowing for city officials to change the colors of the bridge's lighting for holiday celebrations and civic events.

On December 12, 2019, the PennDOT-led renovation and rehabilitation project was officially completed and a ribbon-cutting ceremony was held at the bridge. The project had finished four weeks ahead of schedule and within two percent of the original budget. In April 2020, PennDOT won an award for their preservation work on the bridge.

== Characteristics of the bridge ==
The bridge is a relatively old example of an open-spandrel concrete arch bridge. There are five main arches with a span of 110 feet and nine supporting arches with a span of 48 feet. Each main arch span is made up of three arch ribs tied together with transverse spandrel walls, with the walls being used to support the floor system of the bridge. The eastern approach is made with reinforced concrete and supported on columns, while the arches at the western end of the bridge connect directly with the street grade.

The original ornate concrete railings remain, with some restoration work being performed on them from 2016 to 2019. The railings consist of concrete reticulated balustrades with sections for outlooks. The current lighting of the bridge, which sits on the railings, was designed in the 1970s and replaced the original gaslights on obelisks. Two of the original obelisks were reconstructed and added back to the eastern end of the bridge in 2018.

== Traffic ==
=== Road ===
The bridge carries four lanes of Penn Street across the Schuylkill River, connecting downtown Reading, PA to the neighboring borough of West Reading. The western approach of the bridge connects with an interchange onto the West Shore Bypass section of U.S. Route 422. Due to the prominent location of the bridge within Berks County, it sees an average daily traffic volume of nearly 34,000.

=== Pedestrians and cyclists ===
There are barrier protected seven feet wide sidewalks on both sides of the bridge, allowing pedestrians to cross the bridge. The 2016-19 rehabilitation project expanded each shoulder to five feet wide and added bicycle-safe grates, allowing the city government to easily create bike lanes should officials wish to add them.

=== Public transit ===
The original roadway of the current bridge contained two standard gauge electric railway tracks used by the Reading Traction Company to provide trolley car service across the bridge. These tracks were removed around the time that trolley service ended county-wide, and the bridge is now used on bus routes operated by BARTA, or the Berks Area Regional Transportation Authority.
