= Michael O'Pake =

American politician

Michael A. O'Pake

Member of the Pennsylvania Senate from the 11th district
- In office January 2, 1973 – December 27, 2010
- Preceded by: Robert Gerhart
- Succeeded by: Judy Schwank

Member of the Pennsylvania House of Representatives from the 126th district
- In office January 7, 1969 – November 30, 1972
- Preceded by: District Created
- Succeeded by: Harold Stahl

Democratic Whip of the Pennsylvania Senate
- In office January 2, 2001 – December 27, 2010
- Preceded by: Leonard Bodack
- Succeeded by: Anthony Williams

Personal details
- Born: February 2, 1940 Reading, Pennsylvania, U.S.
- Died: December 27, 2010 (aged 70) Reading, Pennsylvania, U.S.
- Party: Democratic
- Education: Saint Joseph's University (AB); University of Pennsylvania (JD)
- Profession: Attorney

Michael A. O'Pake (February 2, 1940 – December 27, 2010) was an American politician who served as a Democratic member of the Pennsylvania State Senate for the 11th District from 1973 to 2010. He served as the Democratic Whip in Pennsylvania from 2000 to 2010.

== Early life and education ==
O'Pake was born on February 2, 1940, in Reading, Pennsylvania to Michael E. and Anna M. O'Pake. He graduated from Reading Central Catholic High School in 1957. He received an A.B. from St. Joseph's University in 1961 and a J.D. from the University of Pennsylvania Law School in 1964. O'Pake was described as a devout Catholic.

== Career ==
O'Pake was elected to the General Assembly of the Pennsylvania House of Representatives in 1968.

In 1972, O'Pake was elected to represent the 11th district in the Pennsylvania State Senate. In November 2000, he was chosen as the Democratic Whip for the Pennsylvania State Senate. He was reelected to the Whip position for the 2011-2012 legislative term. He served as the first chairman of the Senate Aging and Youth Committee and wrote the Child Protective Services law to help victims of child abuse.

== Death ==
O'Pake died on December 27, 2010, at age 70, following complications from heart bypass surgery. In 2011, Saint Joseph's University named their sports complex the O'Pake Recreational Center in O'Pake's honor.

Pennsylvania State Senate
Preceded by Robert Gerhart	Member of the Pennsylvania Senate for the 11th District; 1973–2010	Succeeded by Judy Schwank
Pennsylvania House of Representatives
Preceded by District Created	Member of the Pennsylvania House of Representatives for the 126th District; 1969–1972	Succeeded by Harold Stahl
Party political offices
Preceded by Leonard Bodack	Democratic Whip of the Pennsylvania Senate; 2001–2010	Succeeded by Anthony Williams
Preceded by None; Position made elected	Democratic nominee for Attorney General of Pennsylvania; 1980	Succeeded by Allen Ertel
