= John F. Lutz Furniture Co. & Funerary =

- U.S. National Register of Historic Places
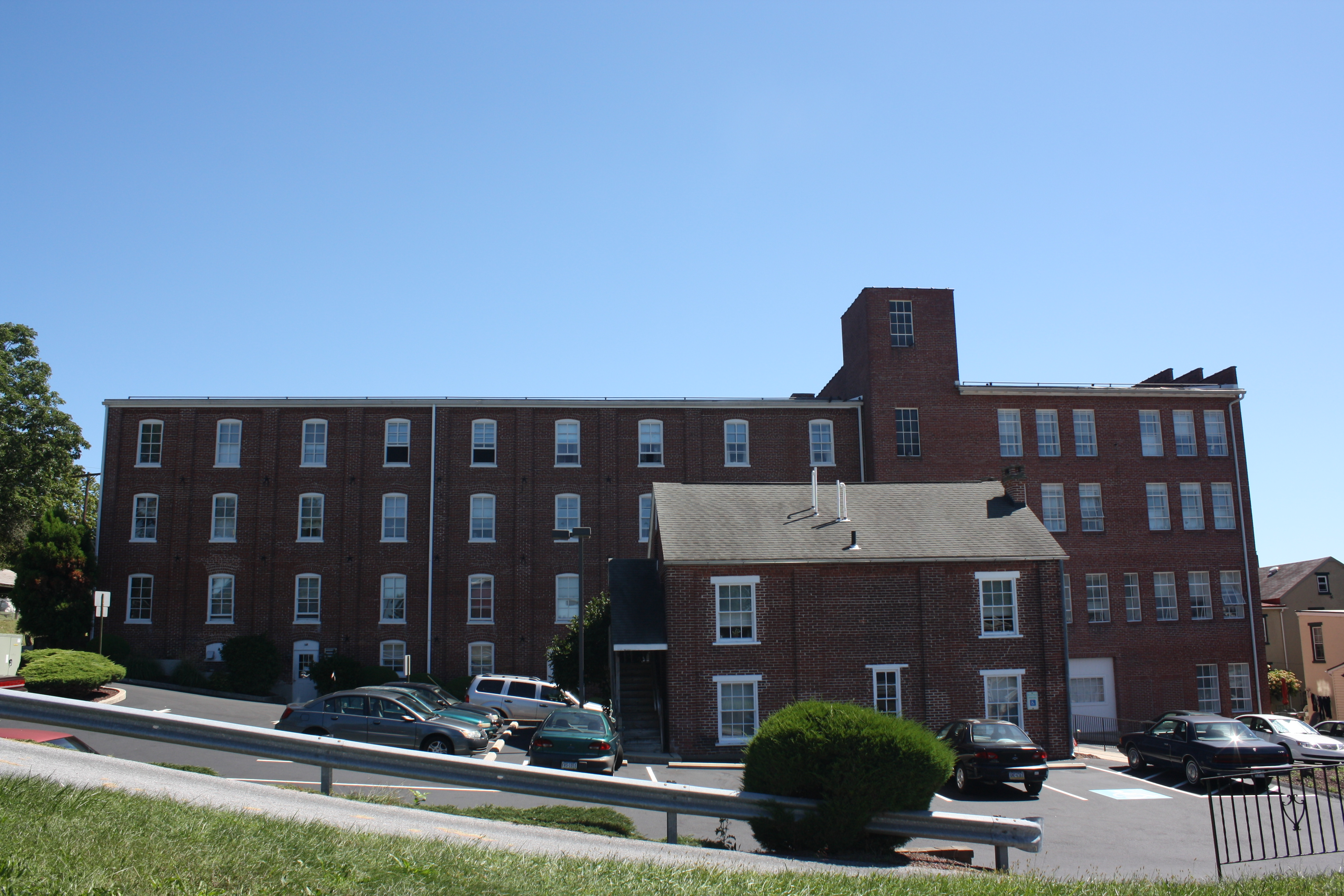
- Warehouse and Carriage House. September 2013.

- Location within Pennsylvania Location within the United States
- Location: 3559 & 3561 St. Lawrence Ave., St. Lawrence, Pennsylvania
- Coordinates: 40°19′33″N 75°51′51″W
- Area: less than one acre
- Built: 1878, 1885, 1896, 1900, 1910, 1928, 1955
- Architectural style: Italianate
- NRHP reference No.: 96000085
- Added to NRHP: February 16, 1996

The John F. Lutz Furniture Co. & Funerary is a historic building complex that is located in St. Lawrence, Berks County, Pennsylvania.

It was added to the National Register of Historic Places in 1996.

== History and architectural features ==
The complex consists of a combination house/shop, warehouse/showroom, and carriage house. The combination house/shop was built in 1878, and is a two-story, brick and frame building that was designed in the Italianate style. Two small, two-story, frame additions were built in 1885 and 1910.

The John F. Lutz Furniture warehouse/showroom building was built in 1900, and is a four-story building, and was also designed in the Italianate style. A four-story brick addition was built in 1928 and a two-story, concrete block addition in 1955. The two-story, brick carriage house was built in 1896, and was also designed in the Italianate style.

John F. Lutz (1863-1936) was a furniture maker, who also built coffins. As such, he also learned to be an undertaker and operated a funerary business. The John F. Lutz Co. remained in business until 1968, after which a furniture outlet occupied the warehouse/showroom building until 1990.

== Gallery ==
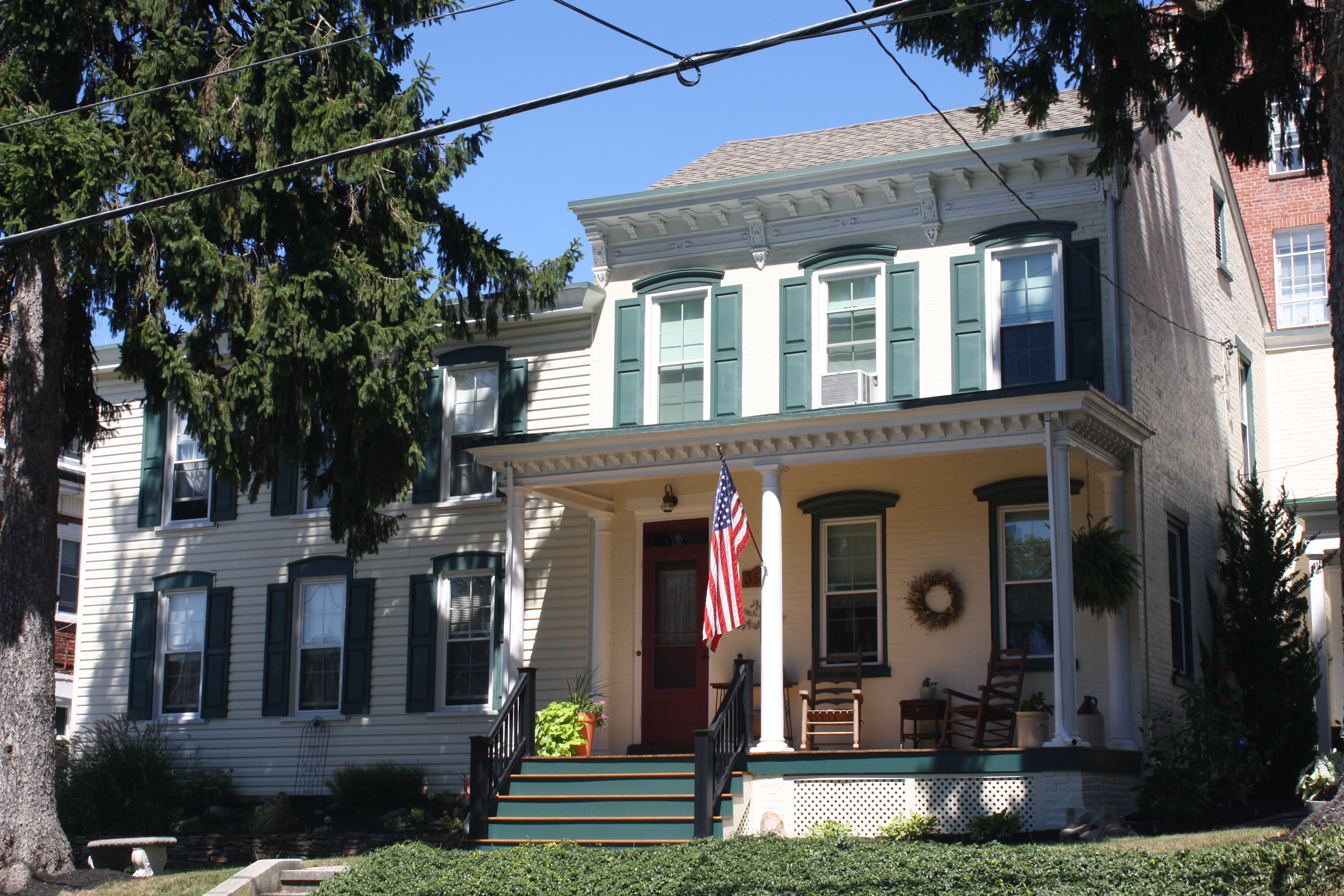
House

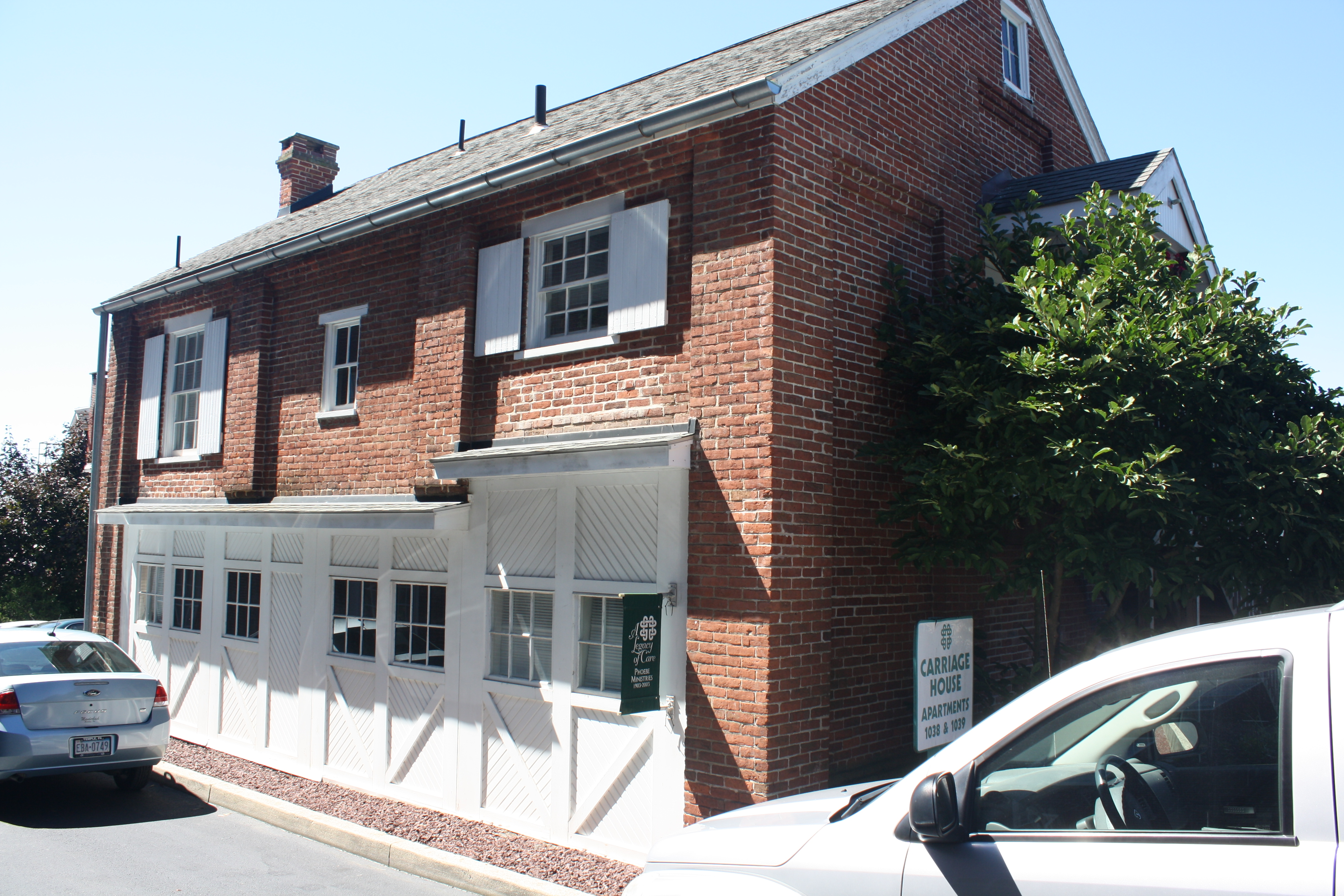
Carriage House

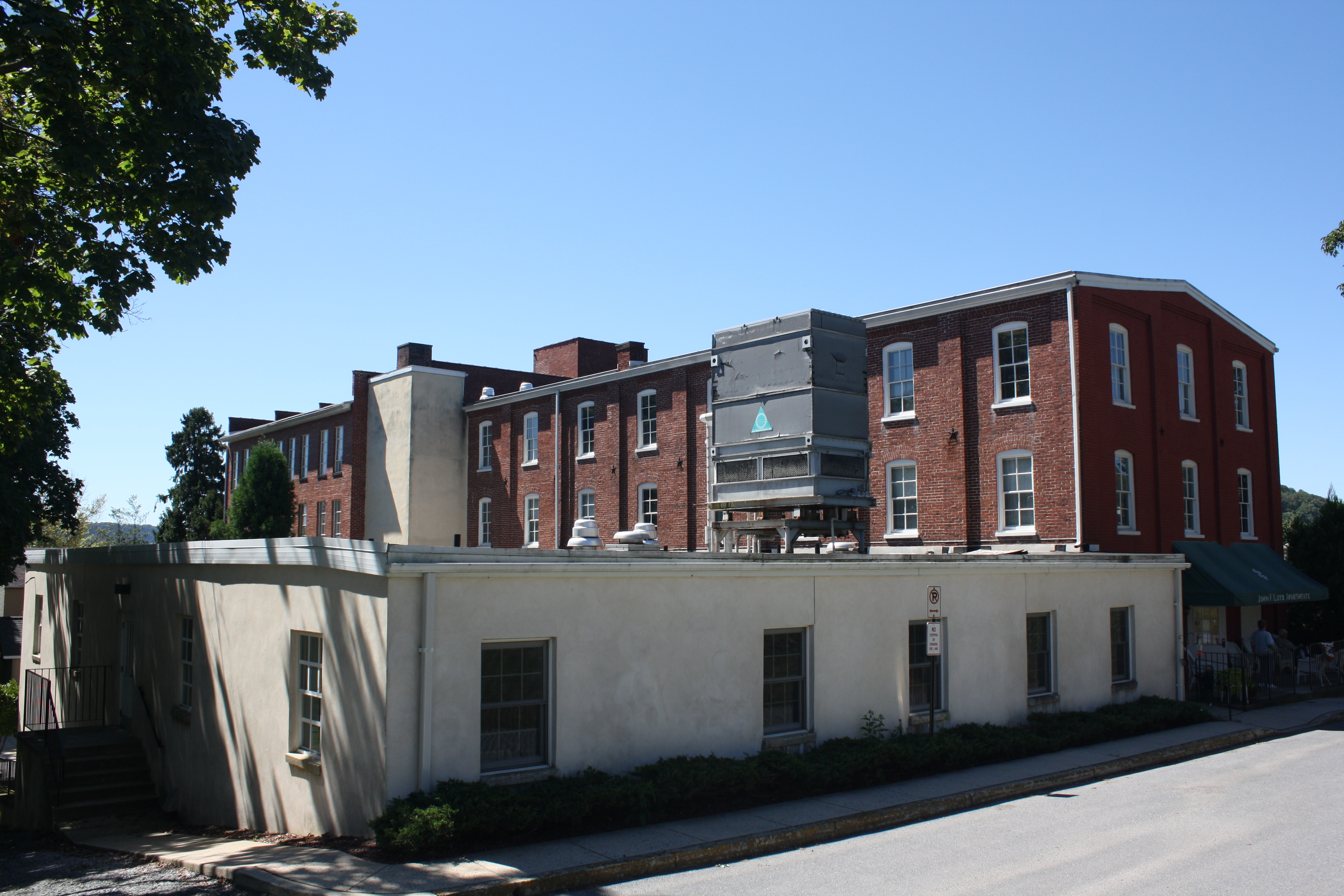
Warehouse and concrete additions on east side.

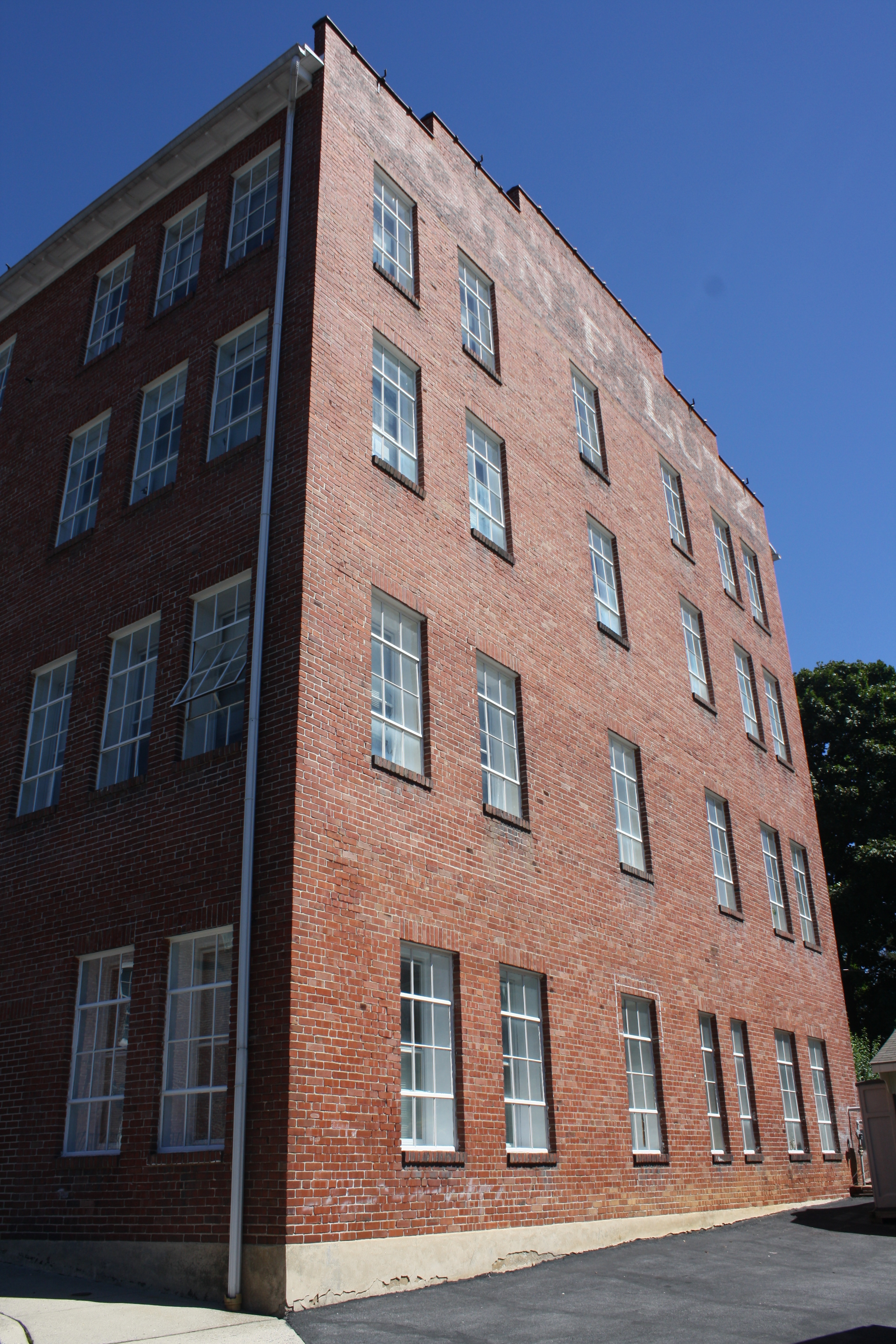
South wall of the Warehouse.

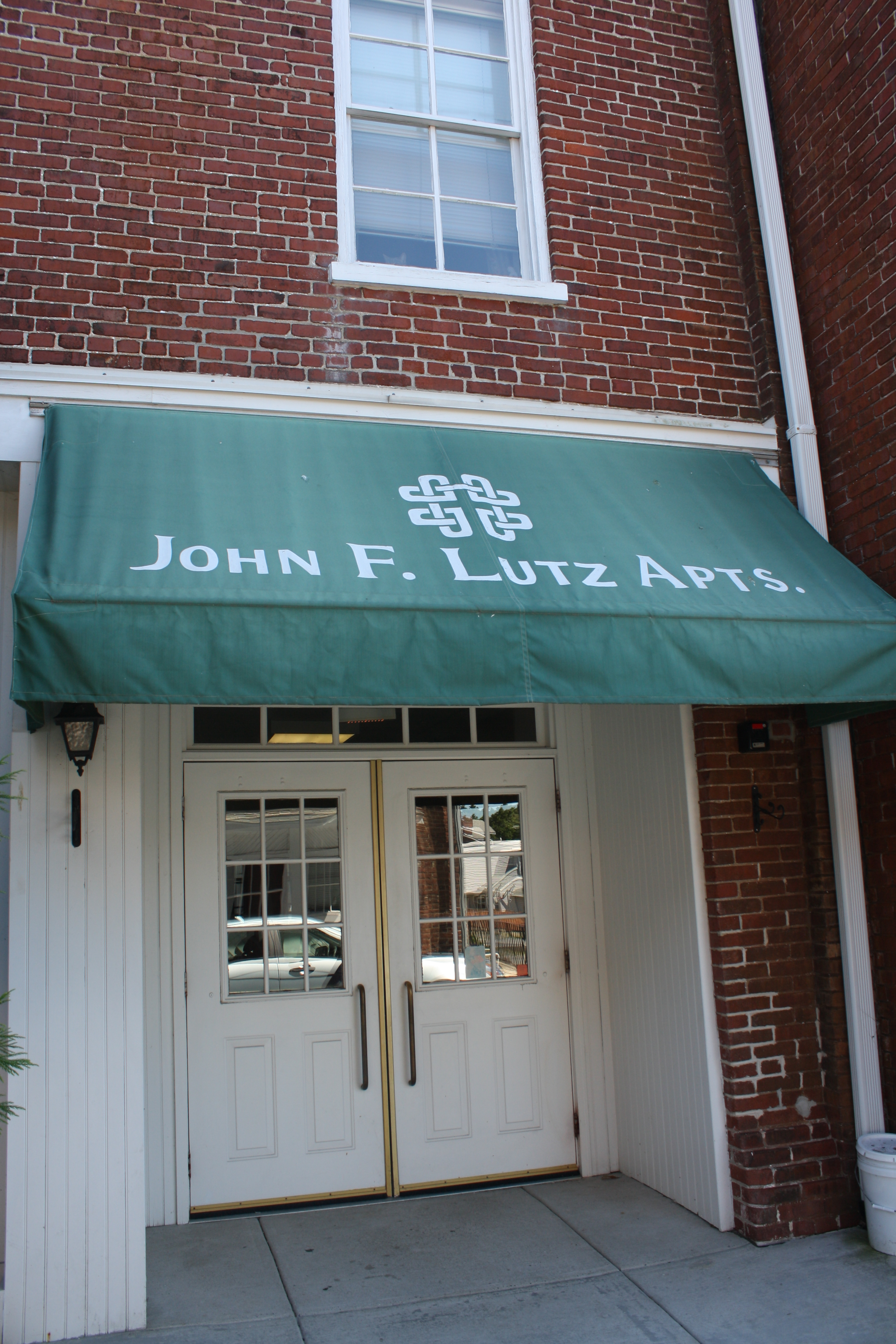
Warehouse entrance.
