= Judy Schwank =

American politician

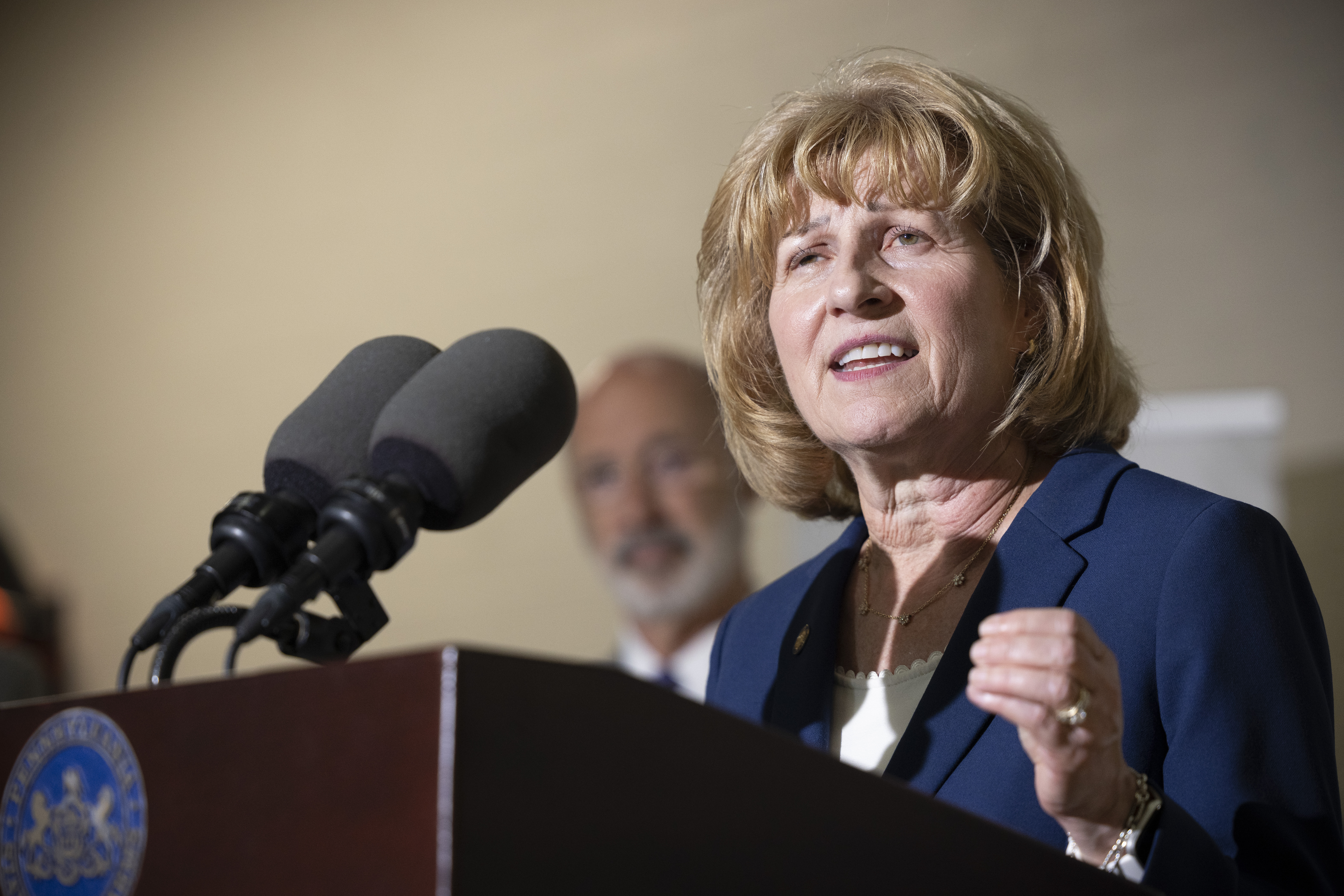

Member of the Pennsylvania Senate from the 11th district
- Incumbent
- Assumed office April 5, 2011
- Preceded by: Michael O'Pake

Member of the Berks County Board of Commissioners
- In office January 3, 2000 – January 7, 2008
- Preceded by: Anthony Carabello
- Succeeded by: Kevin Barnhardt

Personal details
- Party: Democratic
- Spouse: Jim
- Children: 3
- Education: Pennsylvania State University; Harvard University

Judith Schwank (born 1951) is an American politician. A Democrat, she was elected to the Pennsylvania Senate from the 11th district in a special election on March 15, 2011, to succeed the late Michael O'Pake. The district includes the city of Reading and most of eastern Berks County.

== Education ==
Schwank attended the Pennsylvania State University, where she earned a B.S. and M.Ed. in agricultural education. She continued her studies at Harvard University, where she completed the Executive Leadership Program through the Institute for Conservation Leadership and the Institute for the Management of Life-Long Education.

== Career ==
Schwank then worked as a Berks County horticultural agent with the Penn State Cooperative Extension for 19 years, during which time she established the Master Gardener Program. In 1991, she became the first female director of the Berks County Cooperative Extension Program, a position she held until 1999.

From 2000 to 2007, Schwank served two terms as an elected Berks County Commissioner. She also served as the Commission chair from 2004 to 2007. ""I always thought Berks County was property-tax central," said state Sen. Judy Schwank, a Democrat whose district is in Berks County." In 2004, she was appointed by Governor Ed Rendell as chair of the Pennsylvania State Planning Board. She later served as president and CEO of 10,000 Friends of Pennsylvania, a statewide non-profit organization that promotes responsible land use and development. In January 2010, she was appointed Dean of Agriculture and Environmental Sciences at Delaware Valley College.

== Pennsylvania Senate ==
=== 2011 special election ===
On December 27, 2010, longtime Democratic State Senator Michael O'Pake died from complications following heart surgery. A special election was announced to fill the remaining two years in O'Pake's four-year term. On January 22, 2011, Schwank was nominated by the Berks County Democratic Committee and subsequently approved by the state committee.

Her Republican opponent was Larry Medaglia, the Berks County register of wills. On March 15, Schwank defeated Medaglia by a margin of 58%-42%. She received 20,124 votes to Medaglia's 14,794.

=== Committee assignments ===
- Agriculture & Rural Affairs, Minority Chair
- Appropriations
- Game & Fisheries
- Health & Human Services

For the 2025-2026 Session, Schwank serves as the Minority Caucus Administrator.
