= Reiffton, Pennsylvania =

Unincorporated community in Pennsylvania, US

- Census-designated place
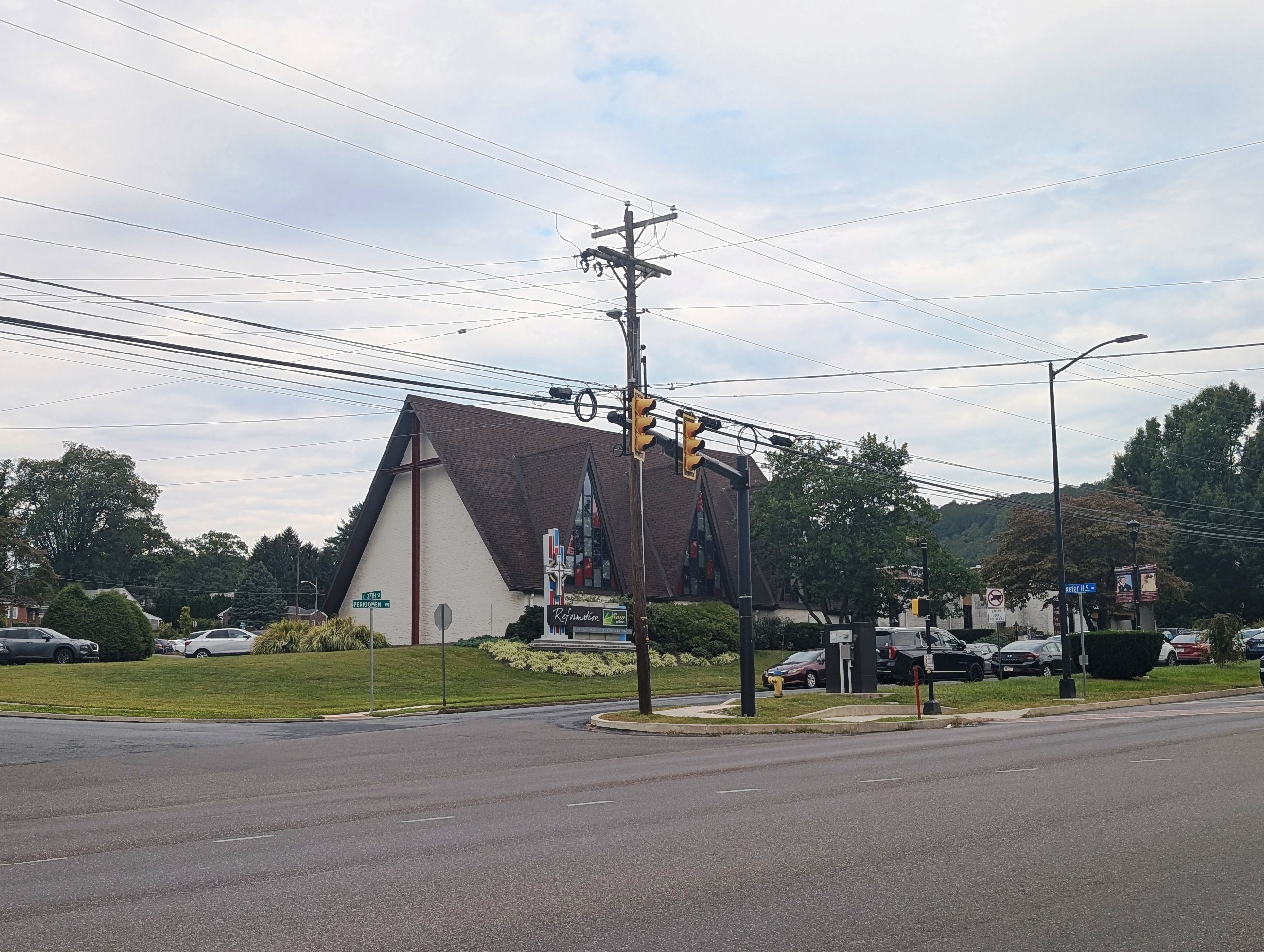
- Reformation Evangelical Lutheran Church in Reiffton

- Location in Pennsylvania and the United States Reiffton (the United States)
- Coordinates: 40°18′56″N 75°52′20″W
- Country: United States
- State: Pennsylvania
- County: Berks
- Township: Exeter

Area
  - Total: 1.91 sq mi (4.95 km^{2})
  - Land: 1.91 sq mi (4.94 km^{2})
  - Water: 0 sq mi (0.00 km^{2})
- Elevation: 397 ft (121 m)

Population (2020)
  - Total: 4,274
  - Density: 2,238.9/sq mi (864.44/km^{2})
- Time zone: UTC-5 (EST)
  - Summer (DST): UTC-4 (EDT)
- ZIP code: 19606
- Area codes: 610 and 484
- FIPS code: 42-64072

Reiffton is a census-designated place (CDP) in Exeter Township, Berks County, Pennsylvania, United States. The population was 4,178 at the 2010 census.

== Geography ==
Reiffton is located at 40°18′56″N 75°52′20″W (40.315642, -75.872337).

According to the United States Census Bureau, the CDP has a total area of 1.6 square miles (4.1 km^{2}), all land.

== Demographics ==
Historical population
Census	Pop.	Note	%±
2020	4,274		—
U.S. Decennial Census

=== 2020 census ===
As of the 2020 census, Reiffton had a population of 4,274. The median age was 45.7 years. 19.4% of residents were under the age of 18 and 22.9% of residents were 65 years of age or older. For every 100 females there were 94.1 males, and for every 100 females age 18 and over there were 92.1 males age 18 and over.

100.0% of residents lived in urban areas, while 0.0% lived in rural areas.

There were 1,601 households in Reiffton, of which 29.0% had children under the age of 18 living in them. Of all households, 60.7% were married-couple households, 13.1% were households with a male householder and no spouse or partner present, and 20.3% were households with a female householder and no spouse or partner present. About 23.0% of all households were made up of individuals and 12.9% had someone living alone who was 65 years of age or older.

There were 1,645 housing units, of which 2.7% were vacant. The homeowner vacancy rate was 0.6% and the rental vacancy rate was 5.6%.

Racial composition as of the 2020 census
Race	Number	Percent
White	3,610	84.5%
Black or African American	153	3.6%
American Indian and Alaska Native	14	0.3%
Asian	123	2.9%
Native Hawaiian and Other Pacific Islander	0	0.0%
Some other race	131	3.1%
Two or more races	243	5.7%
Hispanic or Latino (of any race)	321	7.5%

=== 2000 census ===
At the 2000 census there were 2,888 people, 1,079 households, and 854 families living in the CDP. The population density was 1,780.2 inhabitants per square mile (687.3/km^{2}). There were 1,099 housing units at an average density of 677.5 per square mile (261.6/km^{2}). The racial makeup of the CDP was 97.13% White, 1.11% African American, 0.03% Native American, 1.11% Asian, 0.21% from other races, and 0.42% from two or more races. Hispanic or Latino of any race were 0.97%.

There were 1,079 households, 30.0% had children under the age of 18 living with them, 69.3% were married couples living together, 7.1% had a female householder with no husband present, and 20.8% were non-families. 18.0% of households were made up of individuals, and 9.9% were one person aged 65 or older. The average household size was 2.56 and the average family size was 2.89.

The age distribution was 22.1% under the age of 18, 4.3% from 18 to 24, 22.7% from 25 to 44, 27.8% from 45 to 64, and 23.1% 65 or older. The median age was 46 years. For every 100 females, there were 91.8 males. For every 100 females age 18 and over, there were 88.1 males.

The median household income was $60,893 and the median family income was $68,444. Males had a median income of $50,833 versus $36,970 for females. The per capita income for the CDP was $25,866. About 1.0% of families and 1.4% of the population were below the poverty line, including none of those under age 18 and 5.7% of those age 65 or over.
