= St. Lawrence, Pennsylvania =

Borough in Pennsylvania, US

- Borough
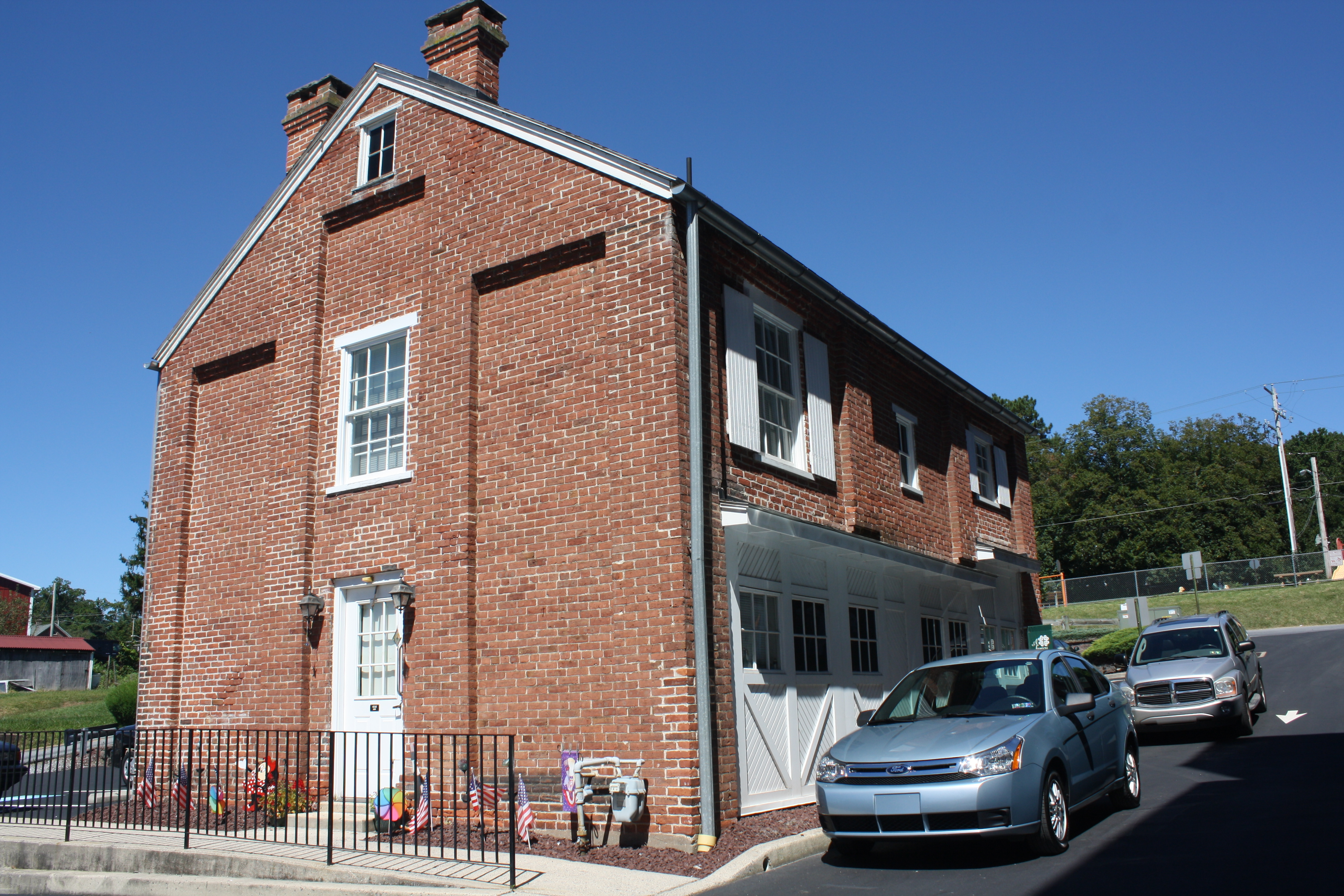
- John F. Lutz Furniture Co. Carriage House

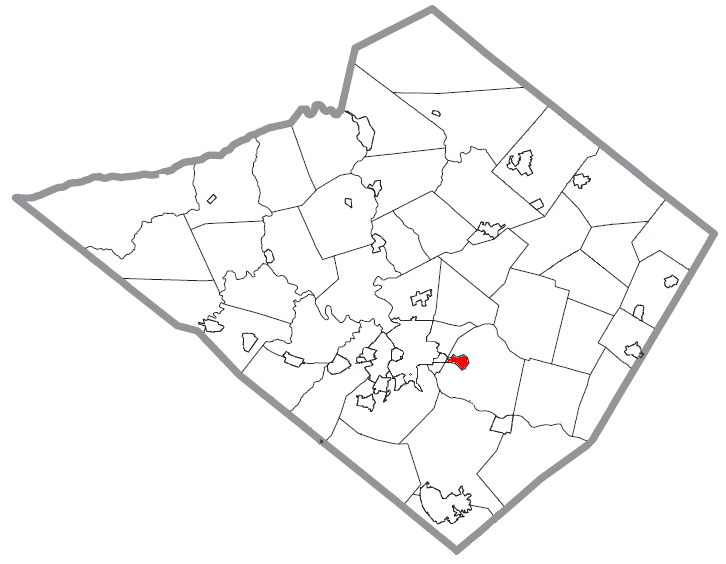
- Location of St. Lawrence in Berks County, Pennsylvania.

- Location of St. Lawrence in Pennsylvania St. Lawrence (the United States)
- Coordinates: 40°19′33″N 75°52′03″W
- Country: United States
- State: Pennsylvania
- County: Berks

Area
  - Total: 0.90 sq mi (2.32 km^{2})
  - Land: 0.90 sq mi (2.32 km^{2})
  - Water: 0 sq mi (0.00 km^{2})
- Elevation: 400 ft (120 m)

Population (2020)
  - Total: 1,892
  - Density: 2,110.3/sq mi (814.81/km^{2})
- Time zone: UTC-5 (EST)
  - Summer (DST): UTC-4 (EDT)
- ZIP code: 19606
- Area codes: 610 and 484
- FIPS code: 42-67304
- Website: stlawboro.us

St. Lawrence, is a borough in Berks County, Pennsylvania, United States. The population was 1,892 at the 2020 census. It sits just east of Mount Penn and Reading. It is served by the Exeter Township School District.

== History ==
The John F. Lutz Furniture Co. & Funerary buildings was added to the National Register of Historic Places in 1996.

== Geography ==
St. Lawrence, PA is located in south-central Berks County at 40°19′33″N 75°52′3″W (40.325814, -75.867418). It is bordered by the borough of Mount Penn to the west and by Exeter Township to the north, east, and south. A little farther East of 422, is the City of Reading via Penn Street and farther Penn Avenue. (West Reading) The unincorporated communities of Pennside, Jacksonwald, and Reiffton border the borough on the northwest, east, and south, respectively.

According to the United States Census Bureau, St. Lawrence has a total area of 0.9 square miles (2.3 km^{2}), all land.

== Transportation ==
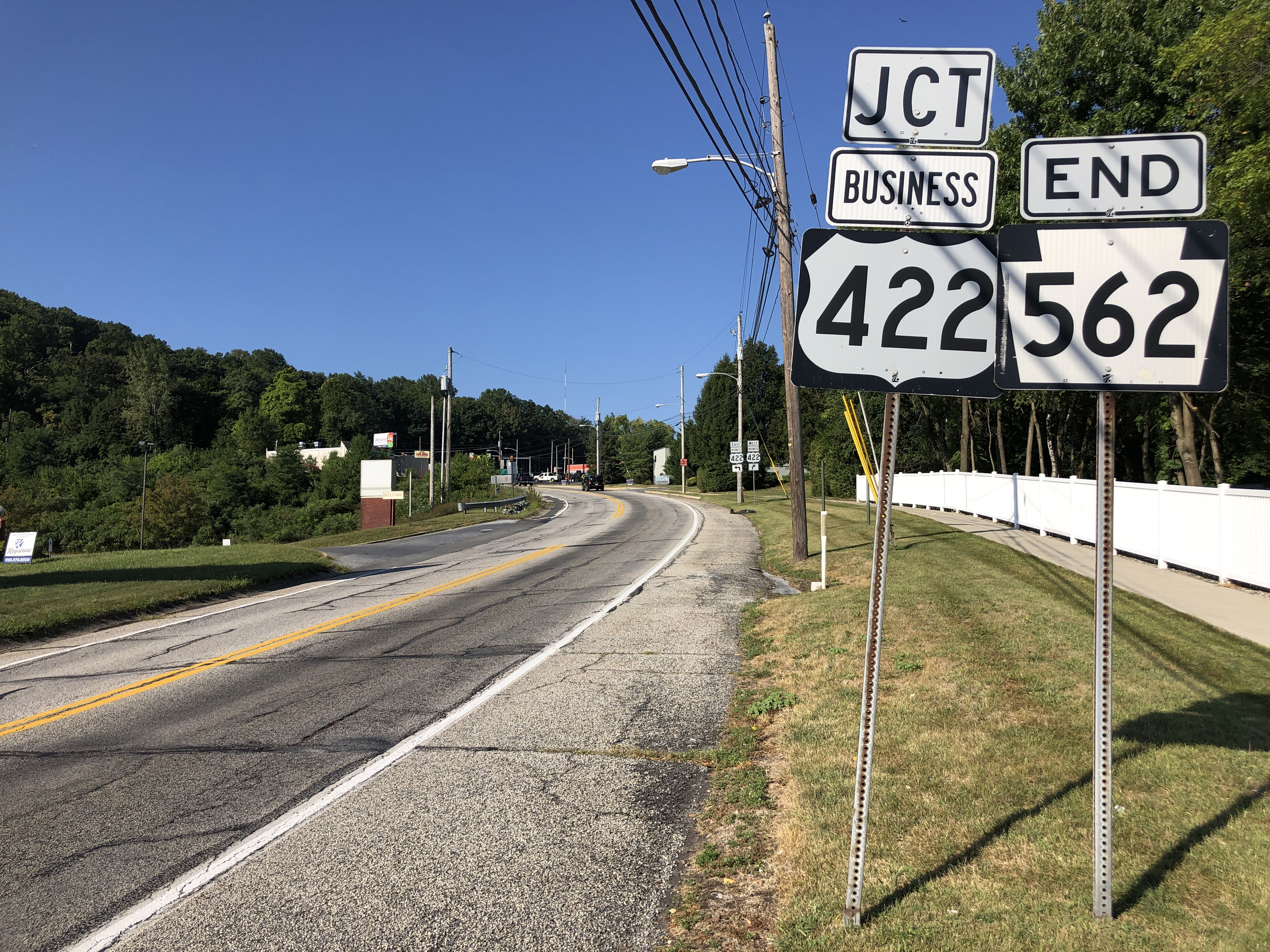
PA 562 westbound approaching US 422 Business in St. Lawrence

As of 2007, there were 7.59 miles (12.21 km) of public roads in St. Lawrence, of which 2.40 miles (3.86 km) were maintained by the Pennsylvania Department of Transportation (PennDOT) and 5.19 miles (8.35 km) were maintained by the borough.

U.S. Route 422 Business and Pennsylvania Route 562 are the numbered highways serving St. Lawrence. PA 562 follows St. Lawrence Avenue from its western terminus at US 422 Business eastward through the heart of the borough, leading east to Boyertown. US 422 Business follows Perkiomen Avenue along a northwest-southeast alignment through the western edge of the borough. It continues west through Mount Penn into the city of Reading, and heads southeast to join mainline US 422 to continue on to Pottstown. It is located approximately 51 miles northwest of Philadelphia.

== Demographics ==
Historical population
Census	Pop.	Note	%±
1920	1,270		—
1930	1,771		39.4%
1940	1,861		5.1%
1950	1,982		6.5%
1960	2,244		13.2%
1970	2,862		27.5%
1980	2,617		−8.6%
1990	2,467		−5.7%
2000	2,639		7.0%
2010	1,809		−31.5%
2020	1,892		4.6%
U.S. Decennial Census

As of the census of 2000, there were 1,812 people, 757 households, and 517 families living in the borough. The population density was 1,996.8 inhabitants per square mile (771.0/km^{2}). There were 781 housing units at an average density of 860.7 per square mile (332.3/km^{2}). The racial makeup of the borough was 95.47% White, 2.15% African American, 0.77% Asian, 0.06% from other races, and 1.55% from two or more races. Hispanic or Latino of any race were 1.82% of the population.

There were 757 households, out of which 31.4% had children under the age of 18 living with them, 54.8% were married couples living together, 9.0% had a female householder with no husband present, and 31.7% were non-families. 26.3% of all households were made up of individuals, and 11.8% had someone living alone who was 65 years of age or older. The average household size was 2.39 and the average family size was 2.90.

In the borough the population was spread out, with 24.3% under the age of 18, 5.5% from 18 to 24, 30.5% from 25 to 44, 23.5% from 45 to 64, and 16.3% who were 65 years of age or older. The median age was 38 years. For every 100 females there were 93.0 males. For every 100 females age 18 and over, there were 86.9 males.

The median income for a household in the borough was $47,400, and the median income for a family was $56,679. Males had a median income of $37,583 versus $27,539 for females. The per capita income for the borough was $22,088. About 4.5% of families and 6.6% of the population were below the poverty line, including 12.1% of those under age 18 and 5.1% of those age 65 or over.

== More information ==
Incorporated in 1927, the borough is named for the St. Lawrence Woolen Mill, founded by William Brumbach, which once operated in town. St. Lawrence was previously known as Esterly, named for Frank Esterly, the keeper of the defunct Black Bear Hotel.

The Oley Turnpike ran through the town, which was the last privately owned toll road in Pennsylvania.
