= Muhlenberg High School =

Location
- 400 Sharp Avenue; Laureldale, Pennsylvania; United States; 40.3929°N 75.9256°W

Information
- Type: Public
- School district: Muhlenberg School District
- Principal: Haniff Skeete
- Teaching staff: 66.00 (FTE)
- Grades: 10th - 12th
- Enrollment: 1,169 (2023–2024)
- Student to teacher ratio: 17.71
- Color
- Team name: Muhls
- Website: https://mhs.muhlsdk12.org/

Muhlenberg High School is a midsized, public high school in Laureldale, Berks County, Pennsylvania. In the 2018–2019 school year, Muhlenberg High School's enrollment was 911 pupils (10–12th).

== Extracurriculars ==
Muhlenberg School District offers a variety of clubs, activities and an extensive sports program.

Muhlenberg School District has an extensive athletics staff including: Athletic Director, Head Athletic Trainer, Assistant Athletic Trainer, Aquatics Director, Director of Youth and Age Group Programs and an Equipment Manager.

=== Sports ===
The district funds:

Boys

- Baseball - AAAA
- Basketball- AAAA
- Bowling - AAAA
- Cross Country - AAA
- Football - AAA
- Golf - AAAA
- Soccer - AAA
- Swimming and Diving - AAA
- Tennis - AAA
- Track and Field - AAA
- Water Polo - AAAA
- Wrestling - AAA

Girls

- Basketball - AAAA
- Bowling - AAAA
- Cheerleading
- Cross Country - AAA
- Field Hockey - AAA
- Golf - AAA
- Soccer (Fall) - AAA
- Softball - AAA
- Swimming and Diving - AAA
- Girls' Tennis -AAA
- Track and Field - AAA
- Volleyball - AAA
- Water Polo - AAAA

According to PIAA directory July 2013

== Notable alumni ==
- Doug Clemens, former professional baseball player, Chicago Cubs, Philadelphia Phillies, and St. Louis Cardinals
