= Mount Penn, Pennsylvania =

Borough in Pennsylvania, US

- Borough
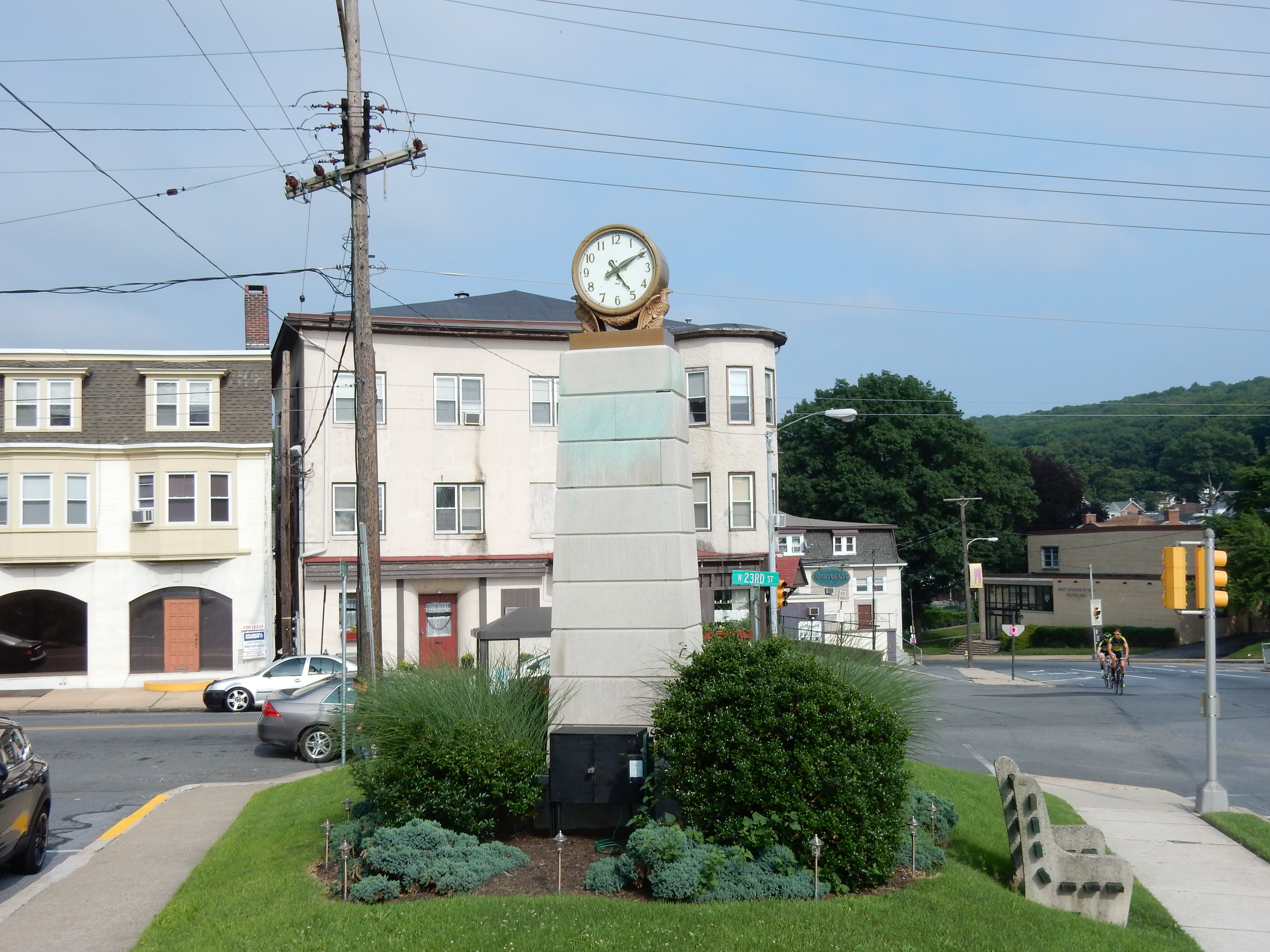

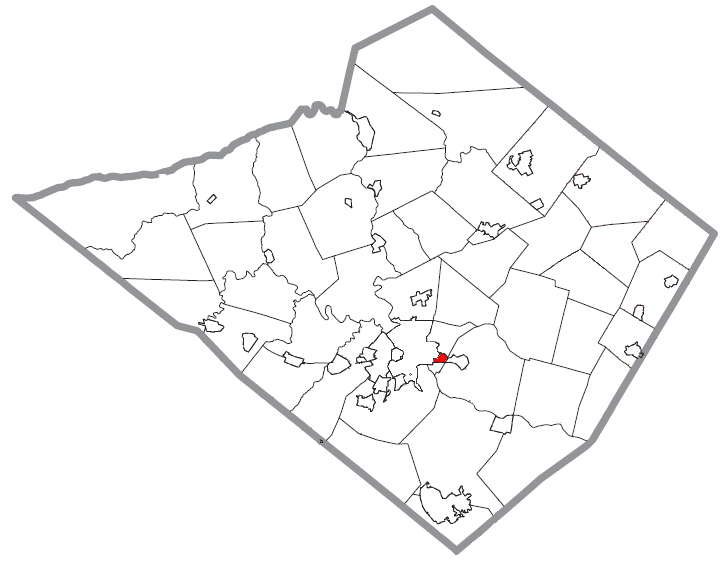
- Location of Mount Penn in Berks County, Pennsylvania.

- Location of Mount Penn in Pennsylvania Mount Penn (the United States)
- Coordinates: 40°19′46″N 75°53′26″W
- Country: United States
- State: Pennsylvania
- County: Berks

Area
  - Total: 0.41 sq mi (1.06 km^{2})
  - Land: 0.41 sq mi (1.06 km^{2})
  - Water: 0 sq mi (0.00 km^{2})
- Elevation: 482 ft (147 m)

Population (2020)
  - Total: 3,240
  - Density: 7,894.0/sq mi (3,047.88/km^{2})
- Time zone: UTC-5 (EST)
  - Summer (DST): UTC-4 (EDT)
- ZIP code: 19606
- Area codes: 610 and 484
- FIPS code: 42-51760
- Website: mtpennborough.com

Mount Penn is a borough in Berks County, Pennsylvania, United States. The population was 3,240 at the 2020 census. The borough shares a name with a 1,120-foot-high (340 m) mountain that rises to the north and overlooks the city of Reading. The peak is sometimes recognized as the southern end of the Reading Prong group of mountains. It was the site of the Mt. Penn Hessian Camp.

== Geography ==
Mount Penn Borough is located in central Berks County at 40°19′46″N 75°53′26″W (40.329359, -75.890691), bordered by the city of Reading to the west. The borough of St. Lawrence borders Mount Penn to the east. The unincorporated community of Pennside lies to the north in Lower Alsace Township. A non-contiguous piece of Lower Alsace Township also borders the south side of Mount Penn.

The borough is in a small saddle between the peak of Mount Penn to the north and 900-foot-high (270 m) Neversink Mountain to the south.

According to the United States Census Bureau, the borough has a total area of 0.42 square miles (1.1 km^{2}), all land.

The Mount Penn Preserve is an area that covers the Mount Penn slopes, north of the borough. Attractions in the Preserve include the Pagoda, the William Penn Memorial Fire Tower, Antietam Lake Park, and numerous businesses and restaurants.

== Demographics ==
Historical population
Census	Pop.	Note	%±
1910	785		—
1920	1,370		74.5%
1930	3,017		120.2%
1940	3,654		21.1%
1950	3,635		−0.5%
1960	3,574		−1.7%
1970	3,465		−3.0%
1980	3,025		−12.7%
1990	2,883		−4.7%
2000	3,016		4.6%
2010	3,106		3.0%
2020	3,240		4.3%

=== 2020 census ===
As of the 2020 census, Mount Penn had a population of 3,240. The median age was 35.2 years. 26.3% of residents were under the age of 18 and 13.9% of residents were 65 years of age or older. For every 100 females there were 98.4 males, and for every 100 females age 18 and over there were 93.0 males age 18 and over.

100.0% of residents lived in urban areas, while 0.0% lived in rural areas.

There were 1,300 households in Mount Penn, of which 34.2% had children under the age of 18 living in them. Of all households, 35.8% were married-couple households, 21.5% were households with a male householder and no spouse or partner present, and 32.2% were households with a female householder and no spouse or partner present. About 31.2% of all households were made up of individuals and 12.5% had someone living alone who was 65 years of age or older.

There were 1,366 housing units, of which 4.8% were vacant. The homeowner vacancy rate was 2.5% and the rental vacancy rate was 3.1%.

Racial composition as of the 2020 census
Race	Number	Percent
White	2,059	63.5%
Black or African American	238	7.3%
American Indian and Alaska Native	20	0.6%
Asian	22	0.7%
Native Hawaiian and Other Pacific Islander	0	0.0%
Some other race	484	14.9%
Two or more races	417	12.9%
Hispanic or Latino (of any race)	1,015	31.3%

=== 2000 census ===
As of the 2000 census, there were 3,016 people, 1,278 households, and 829 families residing in the borough. The population density was 7,076.8 inhabitants per square mile (2,732.4/km^{2}). There were 1,335 housing units at an average density of 3,132.5 per square mile (1,209.5/km^{2}). The racial makeup of the borough was 96.45% White, 1.06% African American, 0.03% Native American, 1.06% Asian, 0.50% from other races, and 0.90% from two or more races. Hispanic or Latino of any race were 3.38% of the population.

There were 1,278 households, out of which 30.2% had children under the age of 18 living with them, 50.4% were married couples living together, 11.2% had a female householder with no husband present, and 35.1% were non-families. 29.6% of all households were made up of individuals, and 13.7% had someone living alone who was 65 years of age or older. The average household size was 2.35 and the average family size was 2.93.

In the borough the population was spread out, with 24.5% under the age of 18, 6.8% from 18 to 24, 30.7% from 25 to 44, 21.6% from 45 to 64, and 16.3% who were 65 years of age or older. The median age was 37 years. For every 100 females there were 91.6 males. For every 100 females age 18 and over, there were 85.9 males.

The median income for a household in the borough was $41,326, and the median income for a family was $47,917. Males had a median income of $40,603 versus $26,890 for females. The per capita income for the borough was $21,738. About 2.4% of families and 4.4% of the population were below the poverty line, including 4.8% of those under age 18 and 9.5% of those age 65 or over.

== Government ==
Mount Penn is governed by an elected mayor and seven-member borough council. The current mayor is Ryan Maurer.

The members of council are

Troy Goodman, President

Richard Lombardo, Vice President

James Cocuzza, Council Member

Michael Kindlick, Council Member

Roger Stief, Council Member

Christine Dise, Council Member

Jason Tuan Duong, Council Member

== Transportation ==
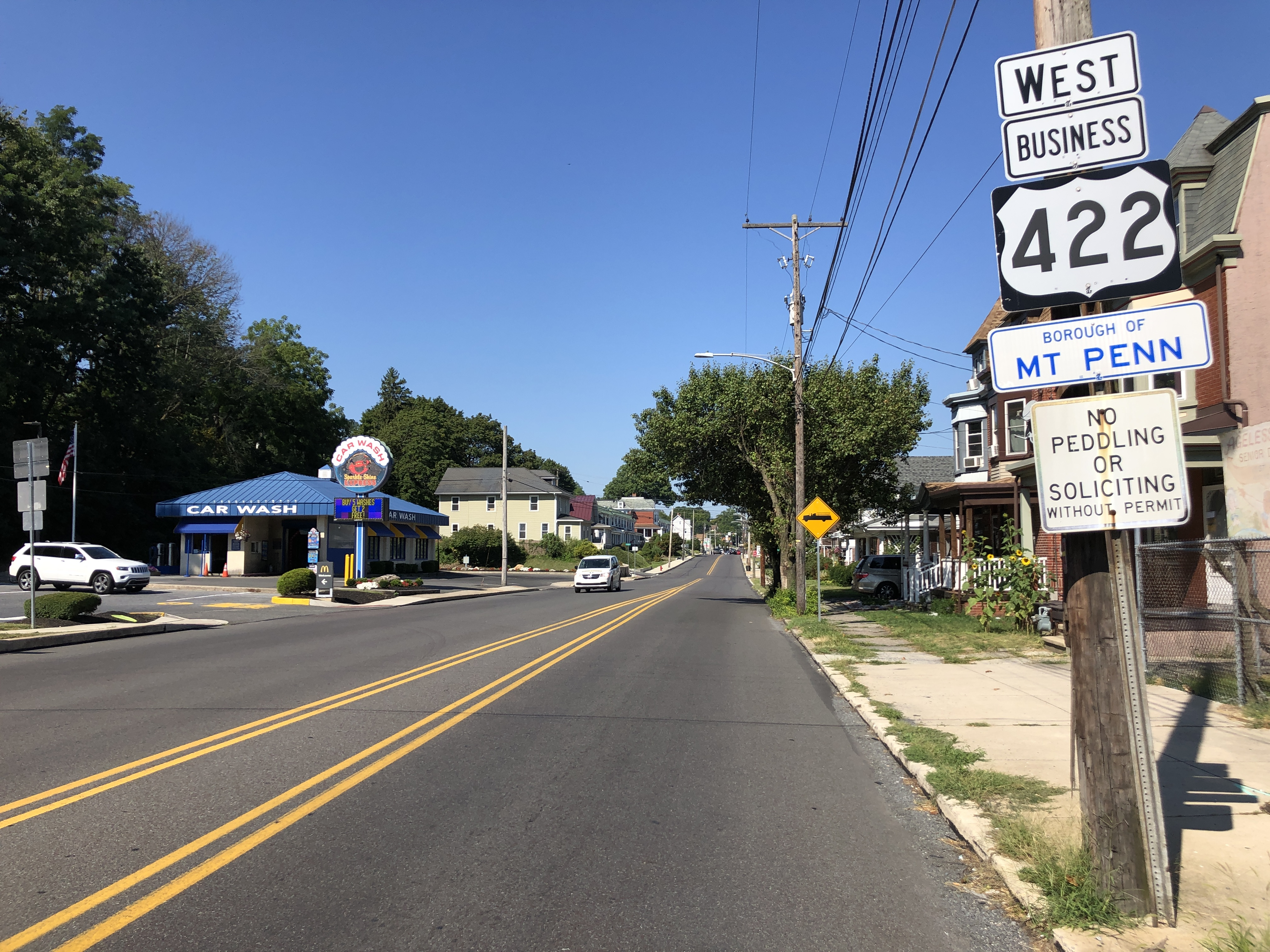
US 422 Business entering Mount Penn

As of 2012, there were 9.82 miles (15.80 km) of public roads in Mount Penn, of which 2.08 miles (3.35 km) were maintained by the Pennsylvania Department of Transportation (PennDOT) and 7.74 miles (12.46 km) were maintained by the borough.

U.S. Route 422 Business is the only numbered highway serving Mount Penn. It follows Perkiomen Avenue through the center of the borough, leading west into downtown Reading and southeast to Pottstown.

== Notable people ==
- Lew Bloom, vaudeville performer
- Charlie Shoemaker, MLB player (Kansas City Athletics)
- James Phyrillas, YouTuber of the channel Schaffrillas Productions
