= Berks County Community Foundation =

Public benefit organization in Pennsylvania, United States

Berks County Community Foundation is a public benefit organization located in Reading, Pennsylvania. The Foundation's mission is to promote philanthropy and improve the quality of life for the residents of Berks County, Pennsylvania.

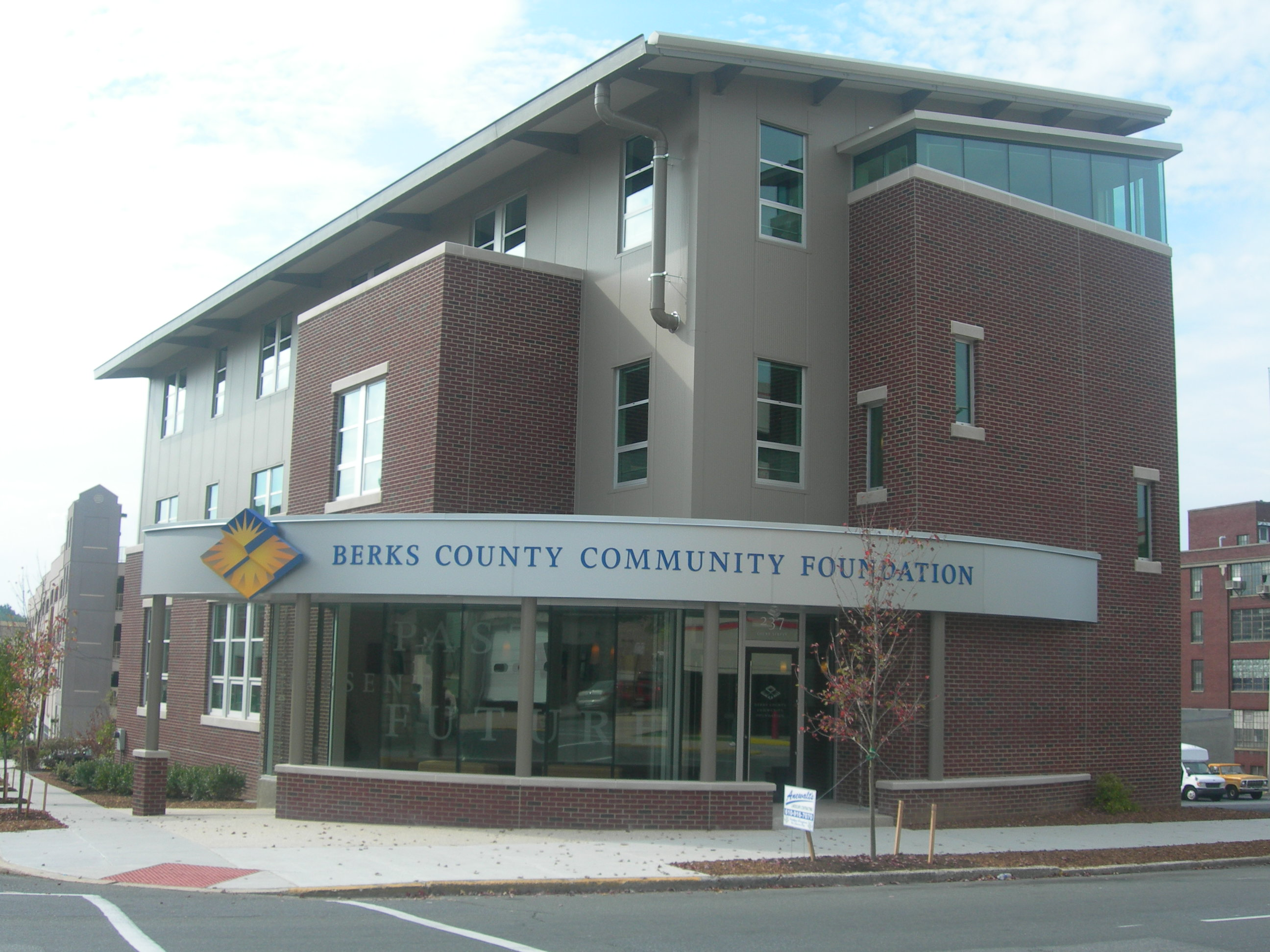
Berks County Community Foundation's platinum LEED-certified green building in Reading, Pa.

Berks County Community Foundation is a member of the Council on Foundations.

== History ==
The foundation was started in 1994 with grants from the Wyomissing Foundation, a local private foundation. Like other community foundations, it works with people, businesses and organizations to set up charitable funds that make grants to causes they care about. It manages hundreds of charitable funds, Some people create funds while they are alive, others in their will.

The foundation's articles of incorporation were filed June 7, 1994. The Wyomissing Foundation gave the fledgling Community Foundation $1 million in initial operating funds. The United Way of Berks County housed the Community Foundation for more than two years until the Community Foundation could afford its own space.

Kevin Murphy was hired as the Foundation's first employee in 1994 and has remained president ever since.

In 2015, a $100,000 grant from the Community Foundation's Hawley and Myrtle Quier Fund to the Reading Downtown Improvement District started the free Downtown Alive outdoor concert series . n.

In 2021, Berks County Community Foundation received a gift of $25 million to establish the Berks Nature Endowment Fund. It is the largest designated fund administered by Berks County Community Foundation.
