= Reading, Pennsylvania =

City in Pennsylvania, US

Reading Reddin (Pennsylvania German)
- City
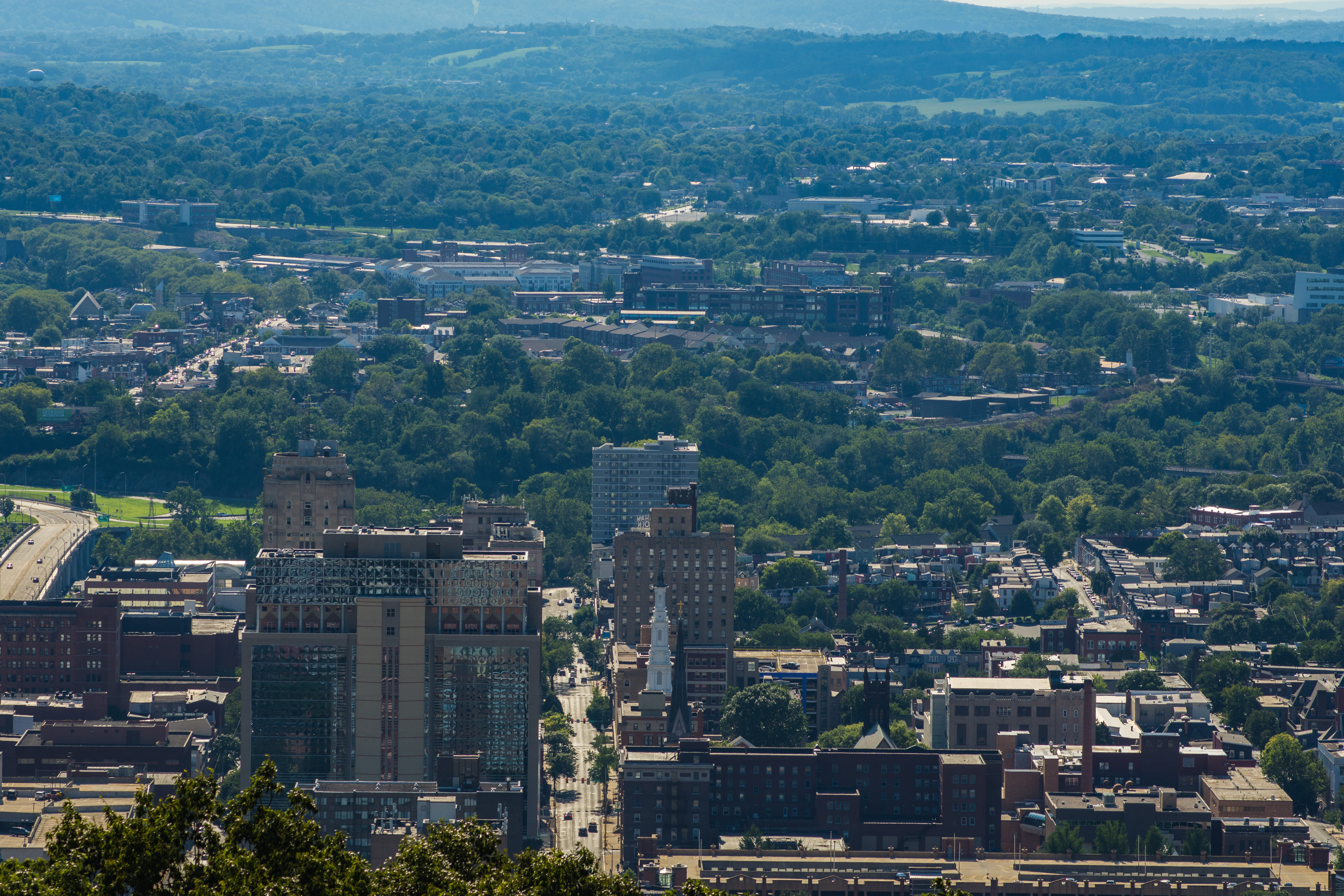
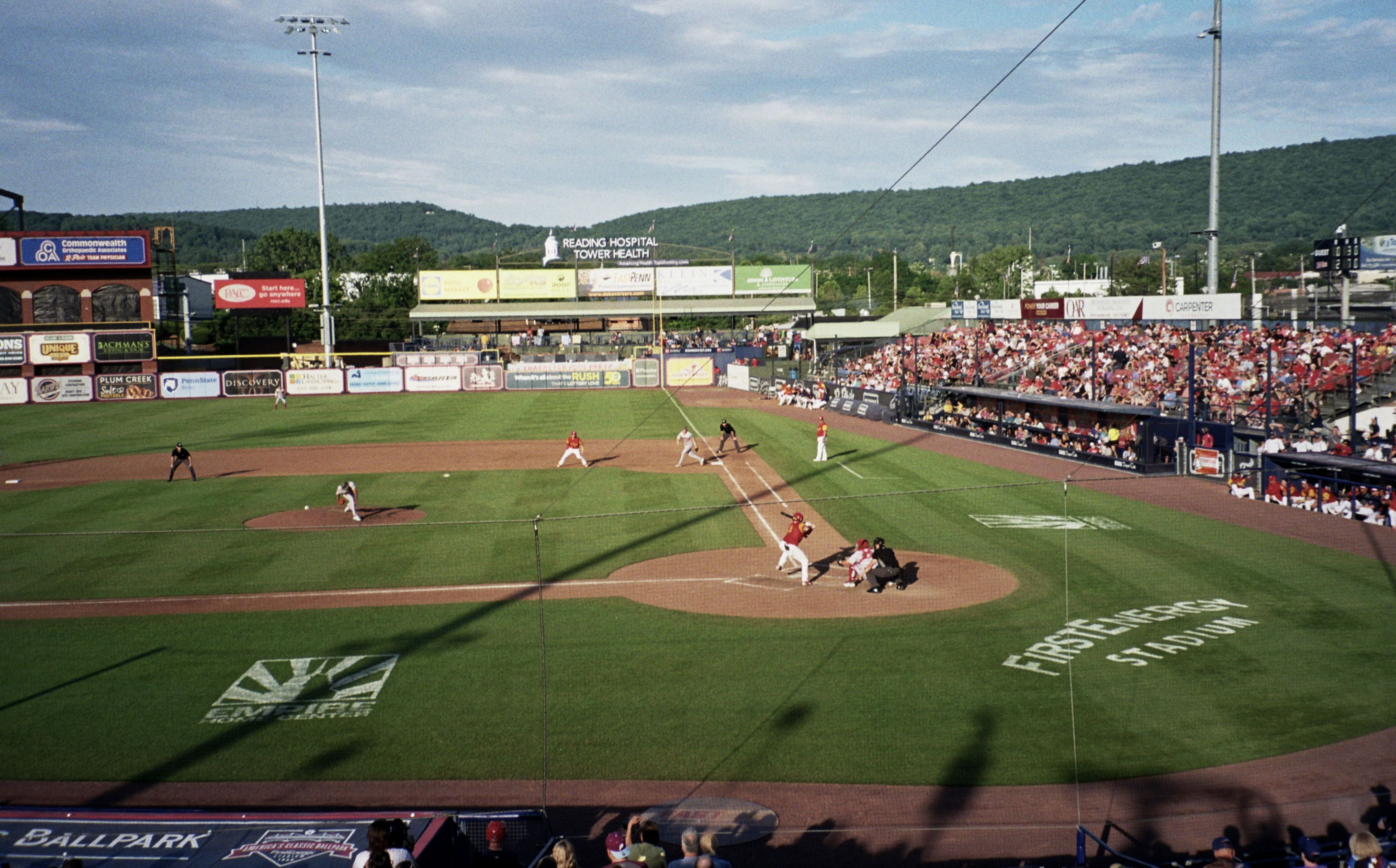
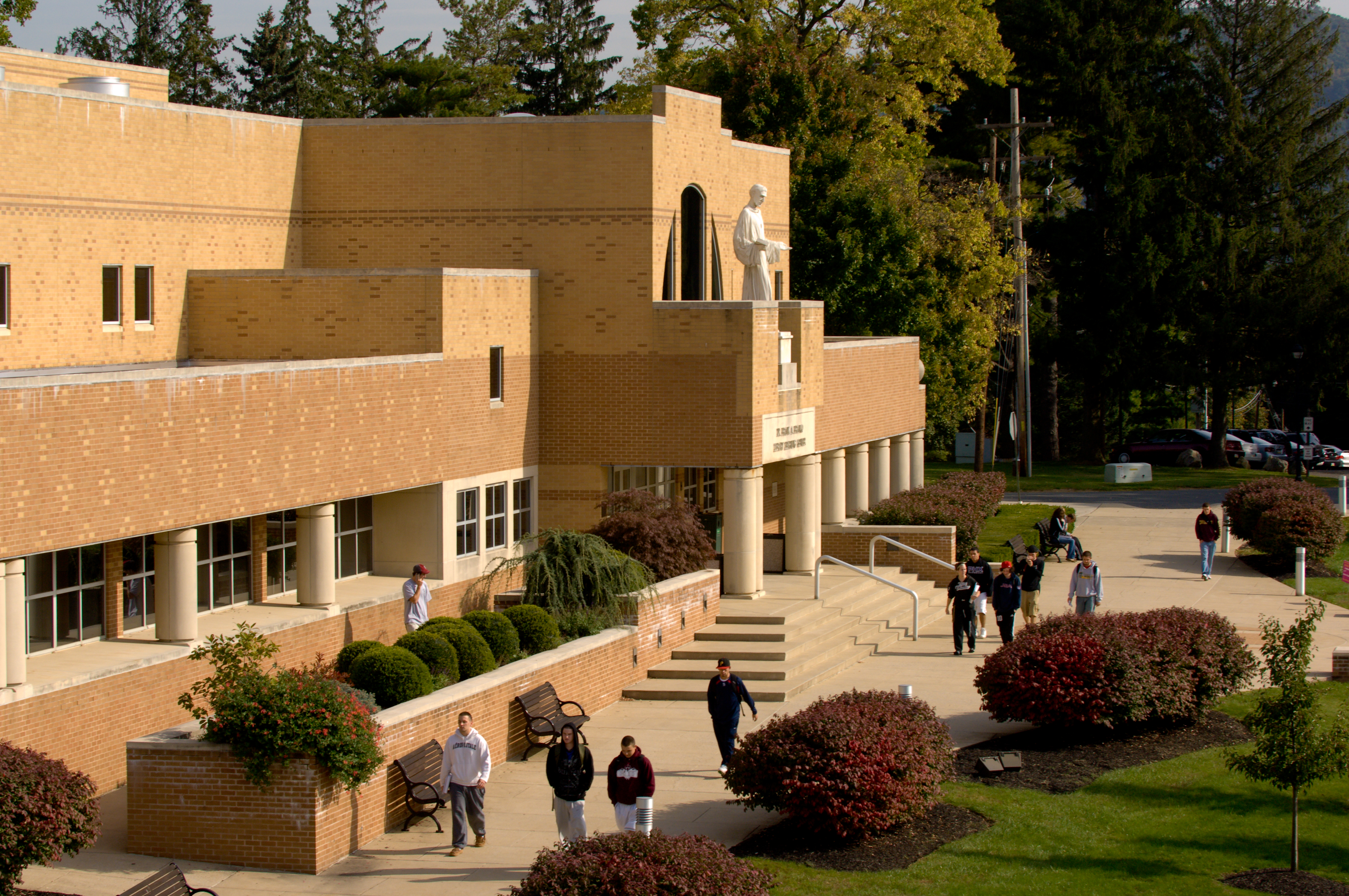
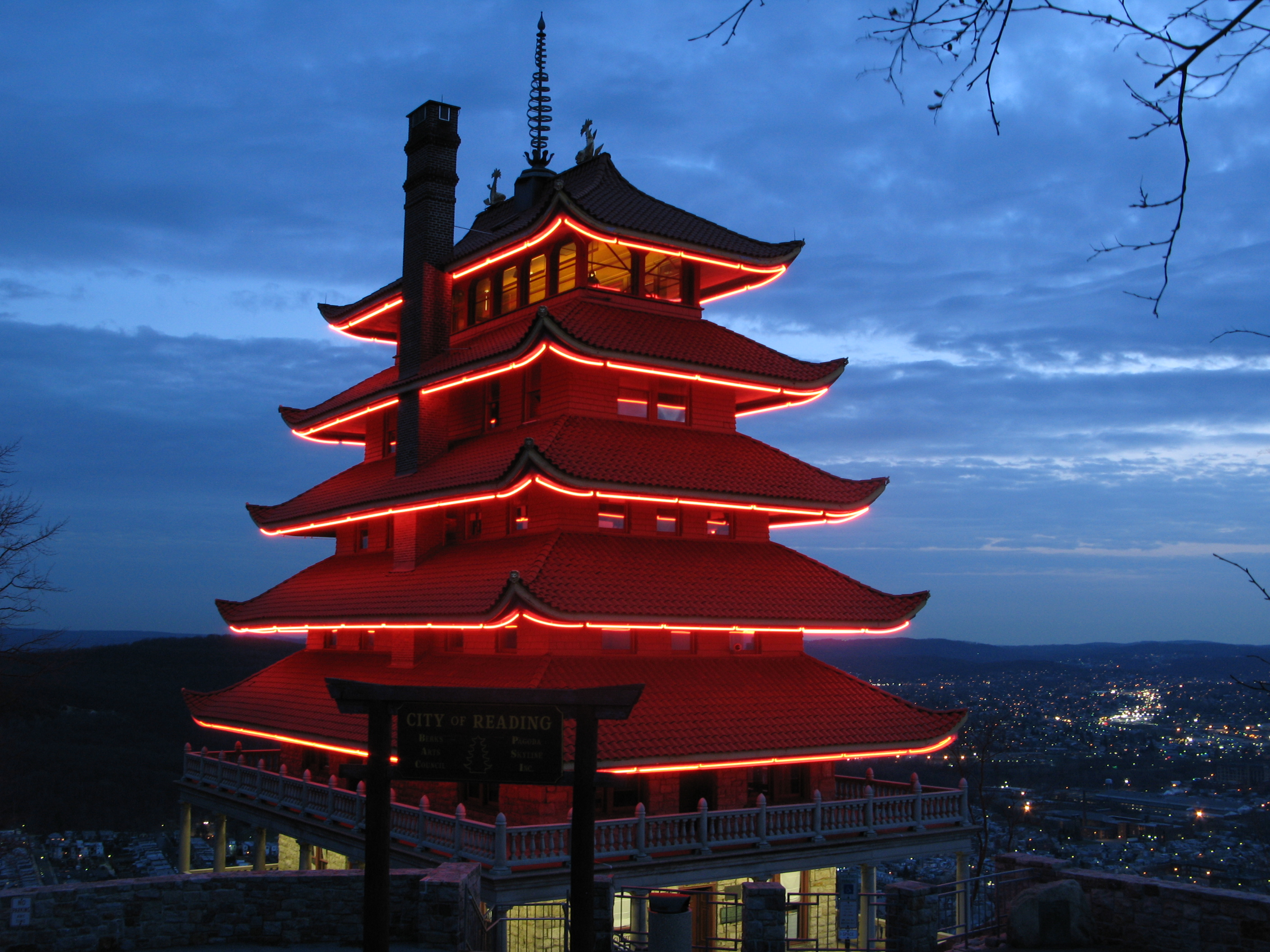
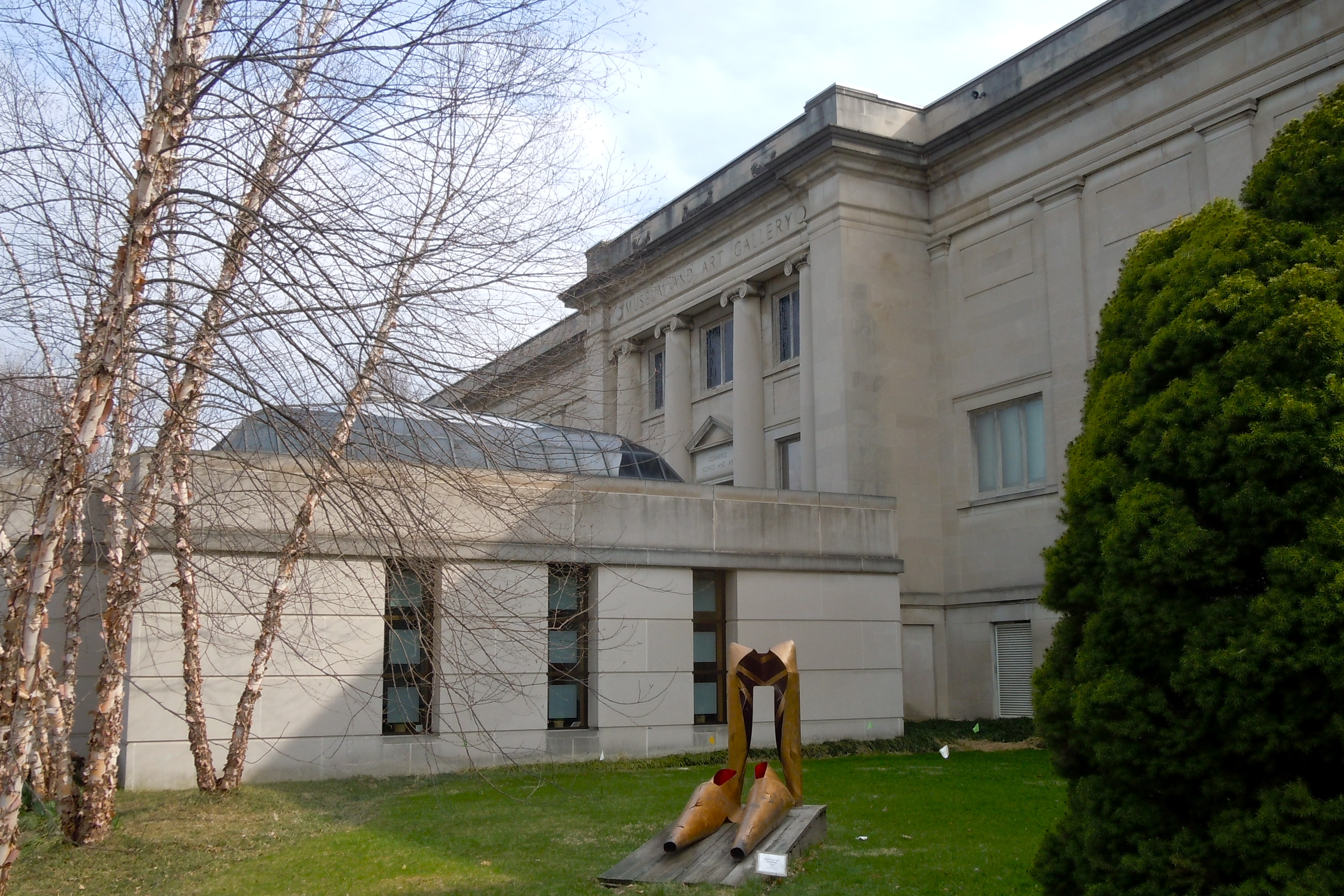
- Reading viewed from the Pagoda FirstEnergy Stadium Alvernia University Pagoda Reading Public Museum

- Flag Seal Logo
- Nicknames: Pretzel Capital of the World, Pretzel City
- Interactive map of Reading
- Location within Pennsylvania Location within the United States Location within North America
- Coordinates: 40°20′30″N 75°55′35″W
- Country: United States
- State: Pennsylvania
- County: Berks
- Founded: 1748
- Incorporated (borough): September 15, 1783
- Incorporated (city): March 16, 1847
- Named for: Reading, England

Government
  - Mayor: Eddie Moran (D)

Area
  - City: 10.08 sq mi (26.11 km^{2})
  - Land: 9.84 sq mi (25.49 km^{2})
  - Water: 0.24 sq mi (0.62 km^{2})
- Elevation: 305 ft (93 m)

Population (2020)
  - City: 95,112
  - Estimate (2022): 94,858 ▼
  - Density: 9,664/sq mi (3,731/km^{2})
  - Urban: 276,278 (US: 149th)
  - Urban density: 2,874/sq mi (1,109.8/km^{2})
  - Metro: 428,849 (US: 126th)
- Demonym(s): Readingite, Redingensian
- Time zone: UTC−5 (EST)
  - Summer (DST): UTC−4 (EDT)
- ZIP Codes: 19601–19612, 19632, 19640
- Area codes: 610, 484
- FIPS code: 42-63624
- Website: www.readingpa.gov

Pennsylvania Historical Marker
- Designated: 1948

Reading (/ˈrɛdɪŋ/ RED-ing; Pennsylvania German: Reddin) is a city in Berks County, Pennsylvania, United States, and its county seat. The city had a population of 95,112 at the 2020 census and is the fourth-most populous city in Pennsylvania after Philadelphia, Pittsburgh, and Allentown.

Reading is located in the southeastern part of the state, 38.8 miles (62.4 km) southwest of Allentown and 50 miles (80 km) northwest of Philadelphia. It is the principal city of the Greater Reading area, which had 420,152 residents in 2020.

Reading gave its name to the now-defunct Reading Company, also known as the Reading Railroad and since acquired by Conrail, that played a vital role in transporting anthracite coal from Pennsylvania's Coal Region to major East Coast markets through the Port of Philadelphia for much of the 19th and 20th centuries. The Reading Railroad is one of the four railroad properties in the classic U.S. version of the Monopoly board game. Reading was one of the first localities where outlet shopping became a tourist industry. It has been known as "The Pretzel City" because numerous local pretzel bakeries are based in the city and its suburbs; currently, Bachman, Dieffenbach, Tom Sturgis, and Unique Pretzel bakeries call the Reading area home. In recent years, the Reading area has become a destination for cyclists with more than 125 miles (201 km) of trails in five major preserves; the region is an International Mountain Bicycling Association ride center.

According to 2010 census data, Reading had the highest share of citizens living in poverty in the nation among cities with populations exceeding 65,000. Reading's poverty rate fell over the next decade. Reading's poverty rate in the five-year American Community Survey, published in 2018, showed that 35.4% of the city's residents were below the poverty line, or less "than the infamous 41.3% from 2011, when Reading was declared the poorest small city in the nation."

== History ==
=== 18th century ===
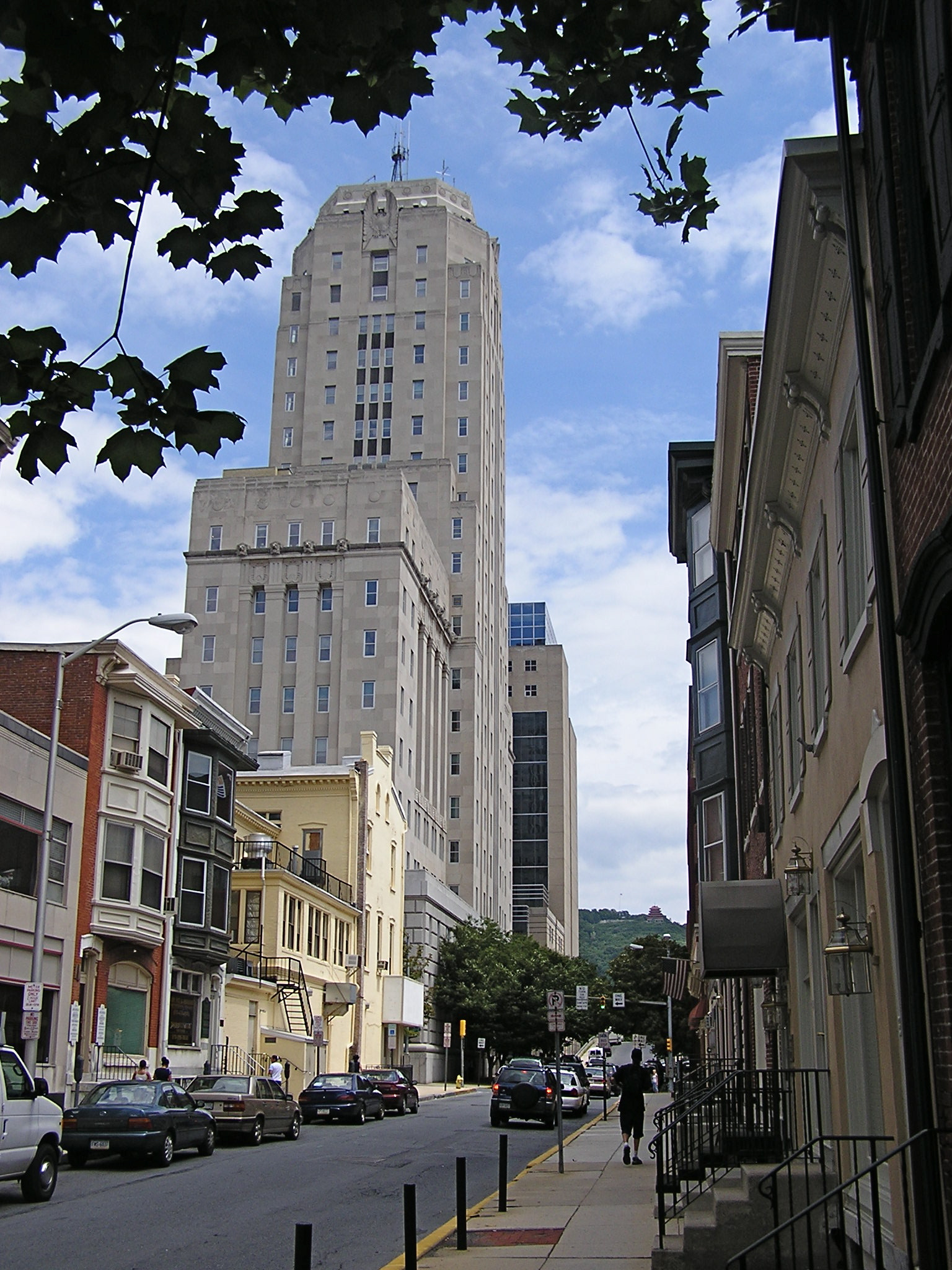
The 500-block of Court Street in Downtown Reading, with the Berks County Courthouse on left

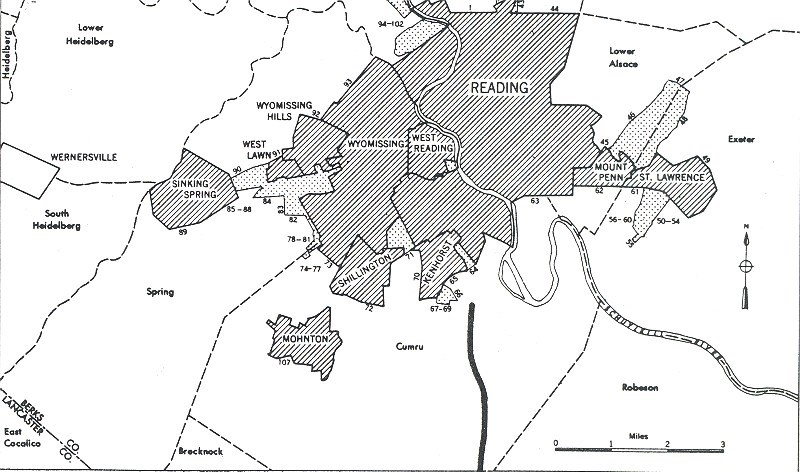
Part of Reading's urbanized area in 1950

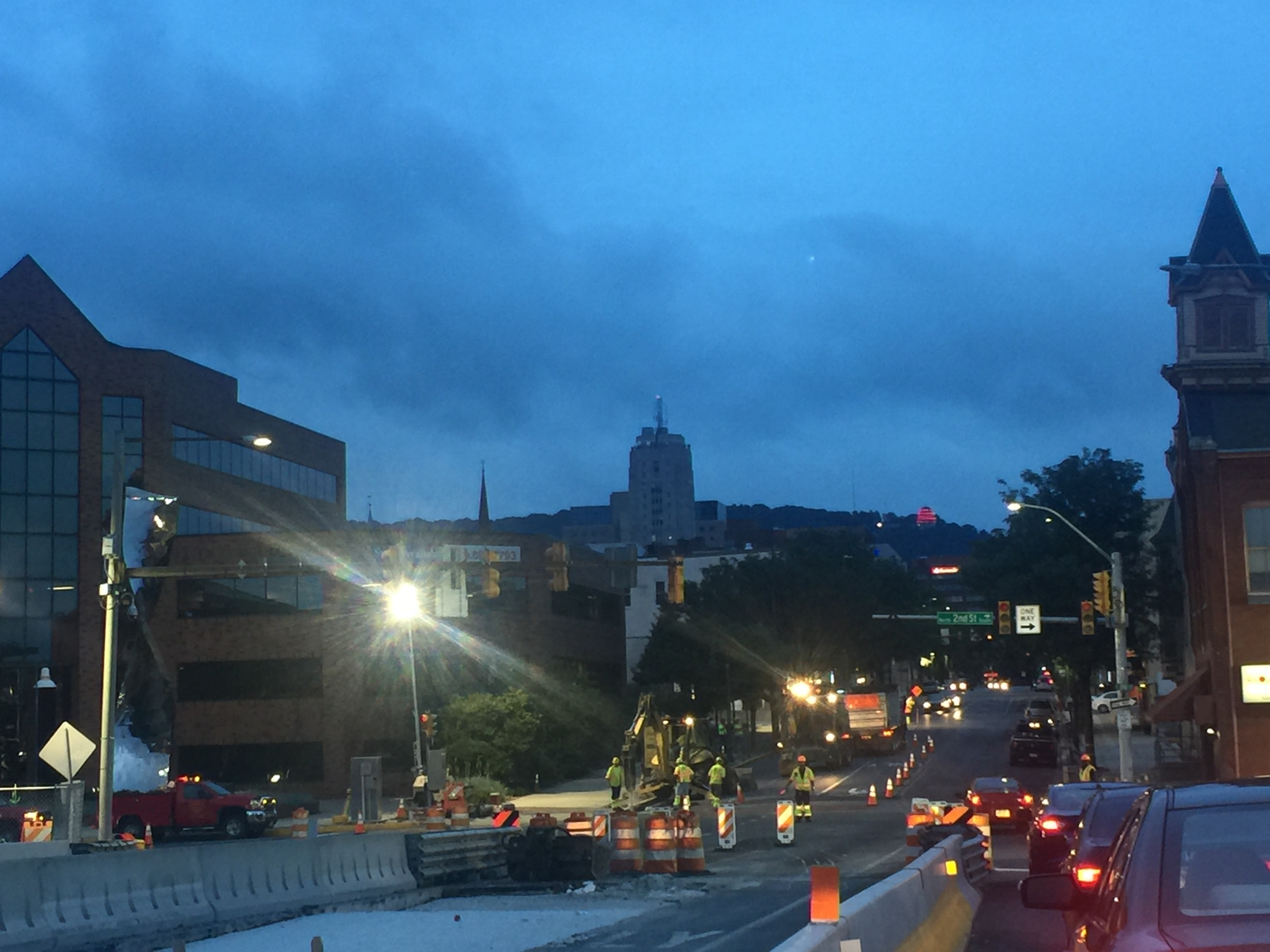
Downtown Reading from Penn and 2nd streets

Lenape people, also known as Delaware Indians, inhabited the Reading area prior to European settlement of the region in the 17th century. The Colony of Pennsylvania was a 1680 land grant from King Charles II of England to William Penn. Comprising more than 45,000 square miles (120,000 km^{2}), it was named for his father, William Penn.

In 1743, Richard and Thomas Penn, both sons of William Penn, mapped out the town of Reading with Pennsylvania German pioneer Conrad Weiser. Taking its name from Reading, Berkshire, England, the town was established in 1748. Upon the creation of Berks County in 1752, Reading became the county seat. The region was settled by emigrants from southern and western Germany, who bought land from the Penns. The first Amish community in the New World was established in Greater Reading, Berks County. The Pennsylvanian German dialect Pennsylvania Dutch was spoken in the area well into the 1950s.

During the French and Indian War, Reading was a military base for a chain of forts along the Blue Mountain.

Scottish American Founding Father James Wilson practiced law in Reading from 1767 until 1775.

By the time of the American Revolution, the area's iron industry had a total production exceeding England's. There were several prominent Ironmasters like Samuel Van Leer who helped supply George Washington's troops with cannons, rifles, and ammunition in the Revolutionary War. During the early period of the conflict, Reading was again a depot for military supply. Hessian prisoners from the Battle of Trenton were also detained here.

Philadelphia was the nation's capital at the time of the 1793 Philadelphia yellow fever epidemic. President George Washington traveled to Reading, and considered making it the emergency national capital, but chose Germantown nearer Philadelphia instead.

=== 19th century ===
In 1809, domestic servant Susanna Cox was tried and convicted for infanticide in Reading. Her case attracted tremendous sympathy; 20,000 spectators came to view her hanging, swamping the 3,000 inhabitants.

According to census data, Reading was among the nation's most-populous 100 cities in the nation from 1810 to 1950.

The Schuylkill Canal, a north–south canal completed in 1825, paralleled the Schuylkill River and connected Reading with Philadelphia and the Delaware River. The Union Canal, an east–west canal completed in 1828, connected the Schuylkill and Susquehanna Rivers, and ran from Reading to Middletown, Pennsylvania, a few miles south of Harrisburg, the state capital. Railroads forced the abandonment of the canals by the 1880s.

Future Supreme Court Justice William Strong lived and practiced law in Reading from 1832 to 1857.

The Philadelphia and Reading Railroad (P&R) was incorporated in 1833. During the Long Depression following the Panic of 1873, a statewide railroad strike in 1877 over delayed wages led to a violent protest and clash with the National Guard in which six Reading men were killed. The Reading Brewing Company was also established around this same time, and was officially chartered in 1886.

The Charles Evans Cemetery is the non-sectarian cemetery where many of the city's prominent business and community leaders have been buried since the cemetery's opening in the 1840s. Established through the donation of land by Reading attorney and philanthropist Charles Evans and a subsequent financial endowment upon his death in 1847, which provided for future improvements to the grounds, the cemetery became a primary gathering point for annual Memorial Day activities from the late 19th through the late 20th centuries due to the presence of the Grand Army of the Republic monument, which was dedicated there in 1887.

=== 20th century ===
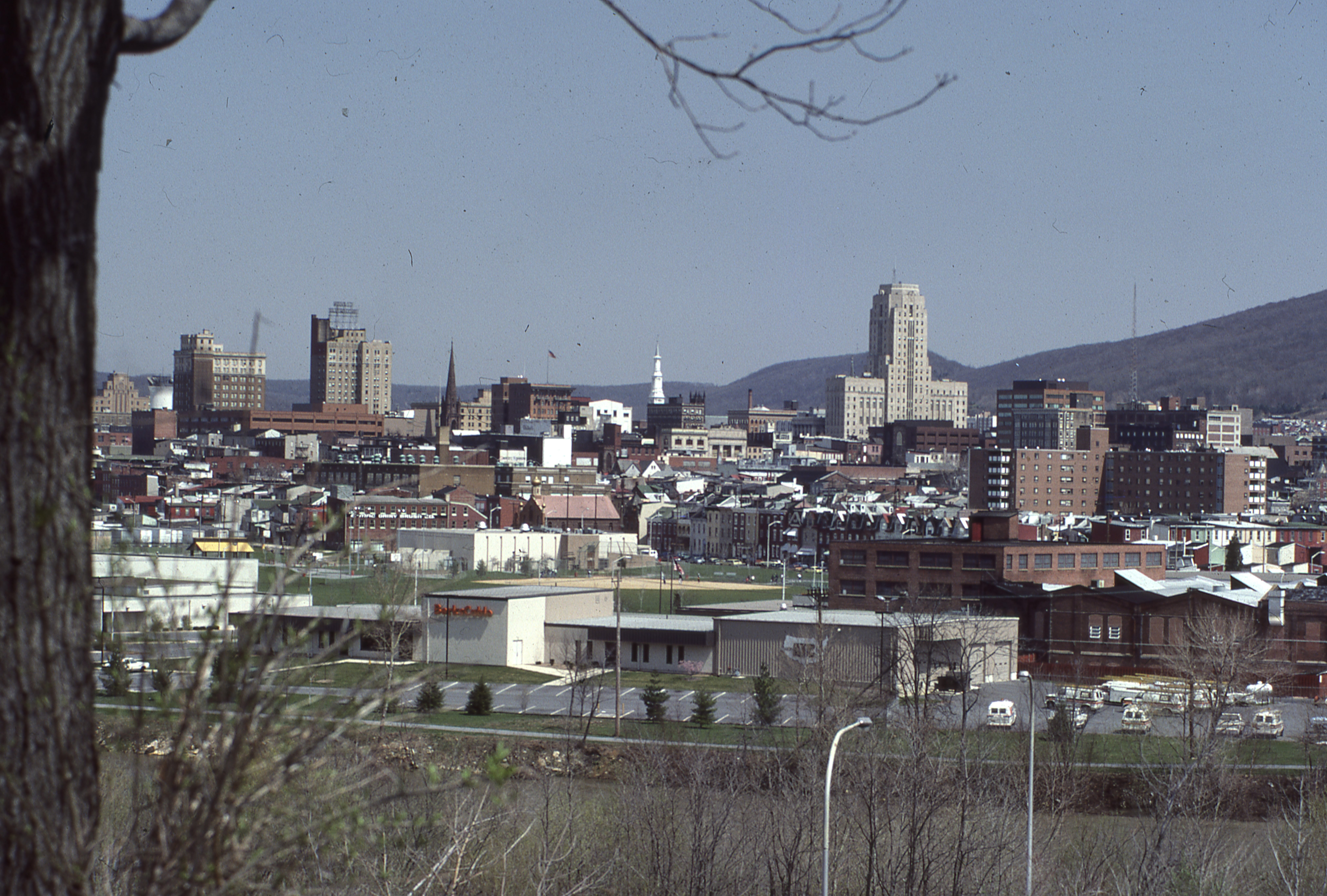
A slide photograph of Reading developed in May 1983

In the early 20th century, the city participated in the burgeoning automobile and motorcycle industry as home to the pioneer "Brass Era" companies, Daniels Motor Company, Duryea Motor Wagon Company, and Reading-Standard Company.

Reading experienced continuous growth until the 1930s, when its population reached nearly 120,000. From the 1940s to the 1970s, however, the city saw a sharp downturn in prosperity, largely owing to the decline of the heavy industry and railroads, on which Reading had been built, and a national trend of urban decline.

Following more than a century of prosperity, the Reading Company was forced to file for bankruptcy protection in 1971. The bankruptcy was a result of dwindling coal shipping revenues and strict government regulations that denied railroads the ability to set competitive prices, required high taxes, and forced the railroads to continue to operate money-losing passenger service lines. On April 1, 1976, the Reading Company sold its current railroad interests to the newly formed Consolidated Railroad Corporation (Conrail). That same month, the Reading Brewing Company closed. In 1972, Hurricane Agnes caused extensive flooding in the city, not the last time the lower precincts of Reading were inundated by the Schuylkill River. A similar, though not as devastating, flood occurred during June 2006.

=== 21st century ===
In December 2007, NBC's Today show featured Reading as one of the top four "Up and Coming Neighborhoods" in the U.S. as showing potential for a real estate boom. The interviewee, Barbara Corcoran, chose the city by looking for areas of big change, renovations, cleanups of parks, waterfronts, and warehouses. Corcoran also noted Reading's proximity to Philadelphia, New York City, and other cities.

== Geography ==
Reading is located at 40°20′30″N 75°55′35″W (40.341692, −75.926301) in southeastern Pennsylvania, roughly 65 miles (105 km) northwest of Philadelphia. According to the United States Census Bureau, the city has a total area of 10.1 square miles (26 km^{2}). 9.8 square miles (25 km^{2}) of it is land and 0.2 square miles (0.52 km^{2}) of it, or 2.39%, is water. The city is largely bounded on the west by the Schuylkill River, on the east by Mount Penn, and on the south by Neversink Mountain. The Reading Prong, the mountain formation stretching northeast into New Jersey, has come to be associated with naturally occurring radon gas; however, homes in Reading are not particularly affected. The surrounding county is home to a number of family-owned farms.

=== Climate ===
Reading, Pennsylvania

Climate chart (precipitation, max. and min. temperature)
J	F	M	A	M	J	J	A	S	O	N	D
3 39 23	2.6 42 24	3.5 51 32	3.4 63 42	3.5 74 52	4.8 82 61	4.8 87 66	4.5 84 64	4.9 77 57	3.8 65 45	3 54 35	3.5 43 28
- █ Average max. and min. temperatures in °F
- █ Precipitation totals in inches
- Source: NOAA
Metric conversion
J	F	M	A	M	J	J	A	S	O	N	D
75 4 −5	66 6 −4	90 11 0	85 17 5	89 23 11	121 28 16	121 30 19	114 29 18	124 25 14	97 19 7	77 12 2	89 6 −2
- █ Average max. and min. temperatures in °C
- █ Precipitation totals in mm

The climate in and around Reading is variable, but relatively mild compared to areas further north. The Reading area falls under the southern periphery of the hot-summer humid continental climate (Dfa), with areas just to the south designated as a humid subtropical climate zone (Köppen Cfa). Summers are warm and humid with average July highs around 86.5 °F (30.3 °C). Extended periods of heat and high humidity occur. On average, there are 27 days per year where the temperature exceeds 90 °F (32 °C). Reading becomes milder in the autumn, as the heat and humidity of summer relent to lower humidity and temperatures. The first killing frost generally occurs in late October.

Winters bring freezing temperatures, but usually move above freezing during the day's warmest point. The average January high is 38.6 °F (3.7 °C); the average January low is 23.0 °F (−5.0 °C), but it is quite common for winter temperatures to undergo much variance from the averages. The all-time record low air temperature (not including wind chill) was −20 °F (−29 °C) during a widespread cold wave in January 1994. Annual snowfall is variable, but averages around 25 inches (64 cm). Spring temperatures vary widely between freezing temperatures and the 80s or even 90s (around 30 °C) later in spring. The last killing frost usually is in early to mid April. Total precipitation for the entire year is 45.21 inches (114.8 cm).

January is the only month averaging below freezing, while two to three months average above 22 °C (71.6 °F) and seven months average above 50 °F (10 °C).

Climate data for Reading, PA (Reading Regional Airport) 1991–2020 normals, extremes 1888–present
Month	Jan	Feb	Mar	Apr	May	Jun	Jul	Aug	Sep	Oct	Nov	Dec	Year
Record high °F (°C)	77 (25)	82 (28)	88 (31)	97 (36)	96 (36)	102 (39)	106 (41)	105 (41)	102 (39)	94 (34)	84 (29)	77 (25)	106 (41)
Mean daily maximum °F (°C)	38.6 (3.7)	41.9 (5.5)	51.0 (10.6)	63.4 (17.4)	73.5 (23.1)	82.0 (27.8)	86.5 (30.3)	84.4 (29.1)	77.1 (25.1)	65.4 (18.6)	53.8 (12.1)	43.4 (6.3)	63.4 (17.4)
Daily mean °F (°C)	30.8 (−0.7)	33.1 (0.6)	41.5 (5.3)	52.5 (11.4)	62.5 (16.9)	71.6 (22.0)	76.1 (24.5)	74.3 (23.5)	66.9 (19.4)	55.2 (12.9)	44.6 (7.0)	35.7 (2.1)	53.7 (12.1)
Mean daily minimum °F (°C)	23.0 (−5.0)	24.4 (−4.2)	31.9 (−0.1)	41.7 (5.4)	51.5 (10.8)	61.2 (16.2)	65.8 (18.8)	64.1 (17.8)	56.6 (13.7)	45.0 (7.2)	35.4 (1.9)	28.0 (−2.2)	44.1 (6.7)
Record low °F (°C)	−20 (−29)	−13 (−25)	−2 (−19)	12 (−11)	26 (−3)	36 (2)	43 (6)	39 (4)	30 (−1)	20 (−7)	8 (−13)	−6 (−21)	−20 (−29)
Average precipitation inches (mm)	2.97 (75)	2.61 (66)	3.53 (90)	3.35 (85)	3.51 (89)	4.77 (121)	4.77 (121)	4.49 (114)	4.88 (124)	3.80 (97)	3.02 (77)	3.51 (89)	45.21 (1,148)
Average snowfall inches (cm)	8.2 (21)	8.8 (22)	5.0 (13)	0.3 (0.76)	0.0 (0.0)	0.0 (0.0)	0.0 (0.0)	0.0 (0.0)	0.0 (0.0)	0.3 (0.76)	1.1 (2.8)	4.8 (12)	28.5 (72.32)
Average precipitation days (≥ 0.01 in)	10.3	10.2	10.7	11.6	12.5	12.4	10.7	11.2	9.1	10.1	8.9	10.8	128.5
Source: NOAA

=== Neighborhoods ===
Name	Area	Population
Center City	0.381 sq. mi	5,374
Callowhill	0.751 sq. mi	7,289
Centre Park	0.615 sq. mi	10,781
College Heights	1.295 sq. mi	14,903
East Reading	2.230 sq. mi	34,572
Eastside	1.849 sq. mi	29,198
Glenside	2.303 sq. mi	11,837
Hampden Heights	3.144 sq. mi	44,101
Millmont	1.024 sq. mi	5,298
North Riverside	0.955 sq. mi	12,674
Northmont	0.035 sq. mi	697
Northside	0.187 sq. mi	1,822
Oakbrook/Wyomissing Park	1.197 sq. mi	5,947
Outlet District	0.554 sq. mi	14,295
Penn's Commons	0.796 sq. mi	15,891
Prince Historic District	0.123 sq. mi	2,002
Queen Anne Historic District	0.330 sq. mi	6,359
Southside	1.486 sq. mi	10,317
South of Penn	1.122 sq. mi	8,483

== Demographics ==
Historical population
Census	Pop.	Note	%±
1790	2,225		—
1800	2,386		7.2%
1810	3,462		45.1%
1820	4,332		25.1%
1830	5,856		35.2%
1840	8,410		43.6%
1850	15,743		87.2%
1860	23,162		47.1%
1870	33,930		46.5%
1880	43,278		27.6%
1890	58,661		35.5%
1900	78,961		34.6%
1910	96,071		21.7%
1920	107,784		12.2%
1930	111,171		3.1%
1940	110,568		−0.5%
1950	109,320		−1.1%
1960	98,061		−10.3%
1970	87,643		−10.6%
1980	78,686		−10.2%
1990	78,380		−0.4%
2000	81,207		3.6%
2010	88,082		8.5%
2020	95,112		8.0%
2025 (est.)	95,832		0.8%
U.S. Decennial Census

As of the 2020 census, Reading had a population of 95,112.

=== Racial and ethnic composition ===
Reading, Pennsylvania – racial and ethnic composition Note: the US Census treats Hispanic/Latino as an ethnic category. This table excludes Latinos from the racial categories and assigns them to a separate category. Hispanics/Latinos may be of any race.
Race / ethnicity (NH = Non-Hispanic)	Pop 1950	Pop 1960	Pop 1970	Pop 1980	Pop 1990	Pop 2000	Pop 2010	Pop 2020	% 1950	% 1960	% 1970	% 1980	% 1990	% 2000	% 2010	% 2020
White alone (NH)	106,384	93,949	81,653	64,208	56,091	39,038	25,258	17,999	97.31%	95.69%	93.17%	81.60%	71.56%	48.07%	28.68%	18.92%
Black or African American alone (NH)	2,883	4,171	5,744	6,013	6,925	8,799	8,774	8,125	2.64%	4.25%	6.55%	7.64%	8.84%	10.84%	9.96%	8.54%
Native American or Alaska Native alone (NH)	7	11	30	80	74	174	183	123	0.01%	0.01%	0.03%	0.10%	0.09%	0.21%	0.21%	0.13%
Asian alone (NH)	23	36	81	494	717	1,233	958	726	0.02%	0.04%	0.09%	0.63%	0.91	1.52%	1.09%	0.76%
Native Hawaiian or Pacific Islander alone (NH)	23	36	81	494	717	14	20	15	0.02%	0.04%	0.09%	0.63%	0.91	0.02%	0.02%	0.02%
Other race alone (NH)	23	10	135	128	87	123	142	503	0.02%	0.01%	0.15%	0.16%	0.11%	0.15%	0.16%	0.53%
Mixed-race or multiracial (NH)	N/A	N/A	N/A	N/A	N/A	1,524	1,517	2,030	N/A	N/A	N/A	N/A	N/A	1.88%	1.72%	2.13%
Hispanic or Latino (any race)	N/A	N/A	N/A	7,763	14,486	30,302	51,230	65,591	N/A	N/A	N/A	9.87%	18.48%	37.31%	58.16%	68.96%
Total	109,320	98,177	87,643	78,686	78,380	81,207	88,082	95,112	100.00%	100.00%	100.00%	100.00%	100.00%	100.00%	100.00%	100.00%

=== 2020 census ===
The median age was 31.4 years, with 28.4% of residents under the age of 18 and 11.4% 65 years of age or older; for every 100 females there were 92.9 males and 89.1 males age 18 and over.

Of the population, 68.9% were Hispanic or Latino, 18.9% were non-Hispanic White, 8.5% were non-Hispanic Black, 0.7% were Asian, 0.1% were Native American or Pacific Islander, and 2.9% were of two or more races.

Racial composition as of the 2020 census
Race	Number	Percent
White	28,519	30.0%
Black or African American	10,799	11.4%
American Indian and Alaska Native	1,446	1.5%
Asian	807	0.8%
Native Hawaiian and Other Pacific Islander	71	0.1%
Some other race	35,747	37.6%
Two or more races	17,723	18.6%
Hispanic or Latino (of any race)	65,591	69.0%

99.9% of residents lived in urban areas, while 0.1% lived in rural areas.

There were 32,669 households in Reading, of which 38.9% had children under the age of 18 living in them. Of all households, 28.2% were married-couple households, 23.8% were households with a male householder and no spouse or partner present, and 37.5% were households with a female householder and no spouse or partner present. About 28.4% of all households were made up of individuals and 10.7% had someone living alone who was 65 years of age or older.

There were 35,617 housing units, of which 8.3% were vacant. The homeowner vacancy rate was 2.5% and the rental vacancy rate was 5.5%.

=== 2010 census ===
As of the 2010 census, the city was 48.4% White, 13.2% Black or African American, 0.9% Native American, 1.2% Asian, 0.1% Native Hawaiian, and 6.1% were two or more races. 58.2% of the population were of Hispanic or Latino ancestry.

=== 2000 census ===
As of the census of 2000, there were 30,113 households, out of which 33.7% had children under the age of 18 living with them, 34.4% were married couples living together, 20.2% had a female householder with no husband present, and 38.8% were non-families. 31.7% of all households were made up of individuals, and 12.4% had someone living alone who was 65 years of age or older. The average household size was 2.63 and the average family size was 3.33.

In the city, the population was spread out, with 29.9% under the age of 18, 11.7% from 18 to 24, 28.9% from 25 to 44, 17.0% from 45 to 64, and 12.4% who were 65 years of age or older. The median age was 31 years. For every 100 females, there were 93.3 males. For every 100 females age 18 and over, there were 88.5 males.

The median income for a household in the city was $26,698, and the median income for a family was $31,067. Males had a median income of $28,114 versus $21,993 for females. The per capita income for the city was $13,086. 26.1% of the population and 22.3% of families were below the poverty line. 36.5% of those under the age of 18 and 15.6% of those 65 and older were living below the poverty line.

=== Estimates ===
According to the U.S. Census Bureau, 32.9% of all residents live below the poverty level, including 45.7% of those under 18. Reading's unemployment rate in May 2010 was 14.7%, while Berks County's unemployment rate was 9.9%.

== Economy ==
Large employers based in Reading and surrounding communities include Boscov's, EnerSys, Carpenter, Penske Truck Leasing, and Redner's Markets. Jump Start Incubator, a program of Berks County Community Foundation, and Berks LaunchBox, a project of Penn State Berks, are programs intended to provide office space and support to entrepreneurs in the area.

According to the Greater Reading Chamber of Commerce and Industry, the largest employers in the Berks county area as of 2017 were:

#	Employer	No. of employees
1	Reading Hospital	6,878
2	East Penn Manufacturing Co.	6,851
3	Carpenter Technology Corporation	2,432
4	County of Berks	2,370
5	Reading School District	1,903
6	Pennsylvania Government	1,886
7	Wal-Mart	1,818
8	Boscov's	1,740
9	Penn State Milton S. Hershey Medical Center	1,566
10	Penske Truck Leasing	1,535

== Arts and culture ==
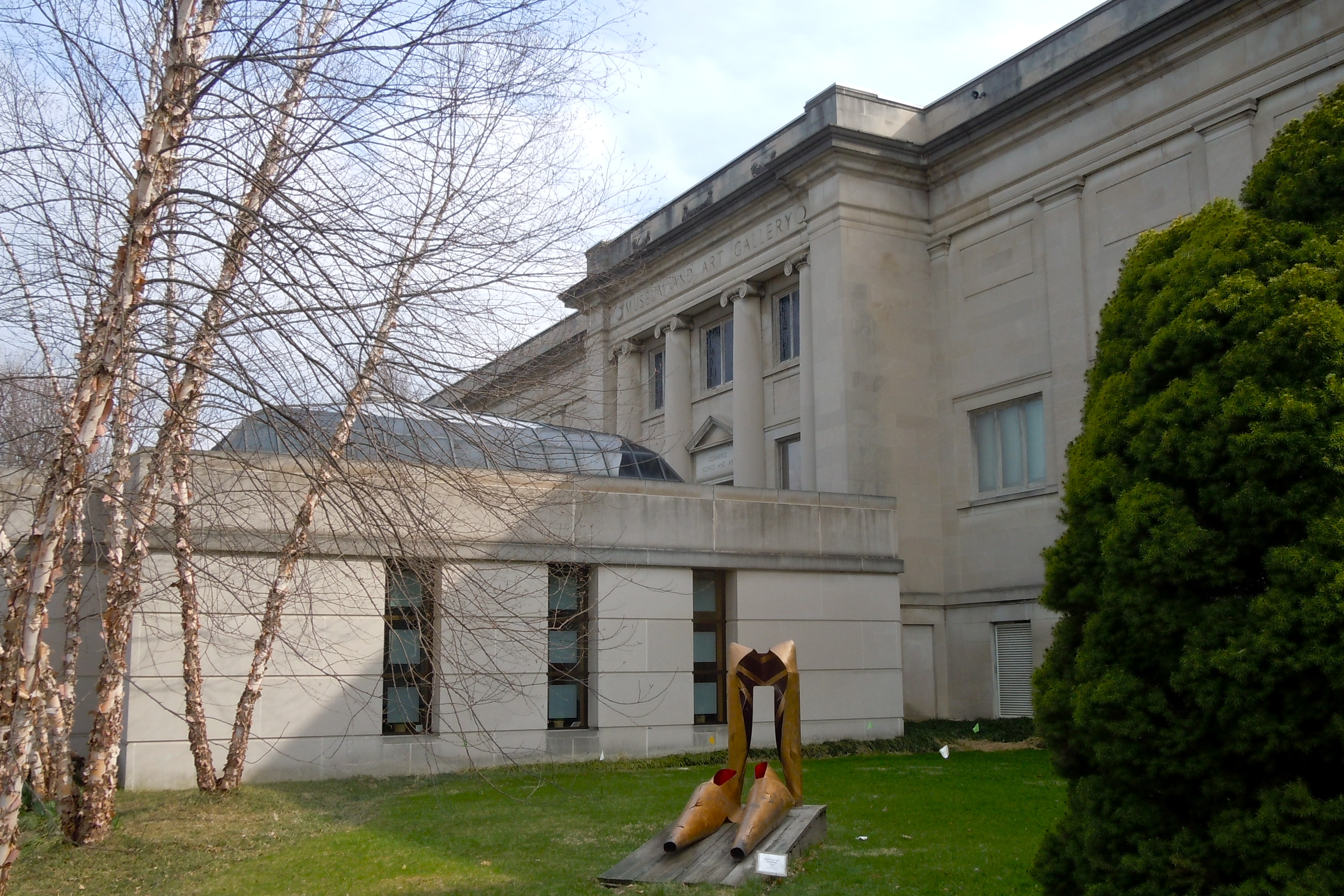
Reading Public Museum in April 2011

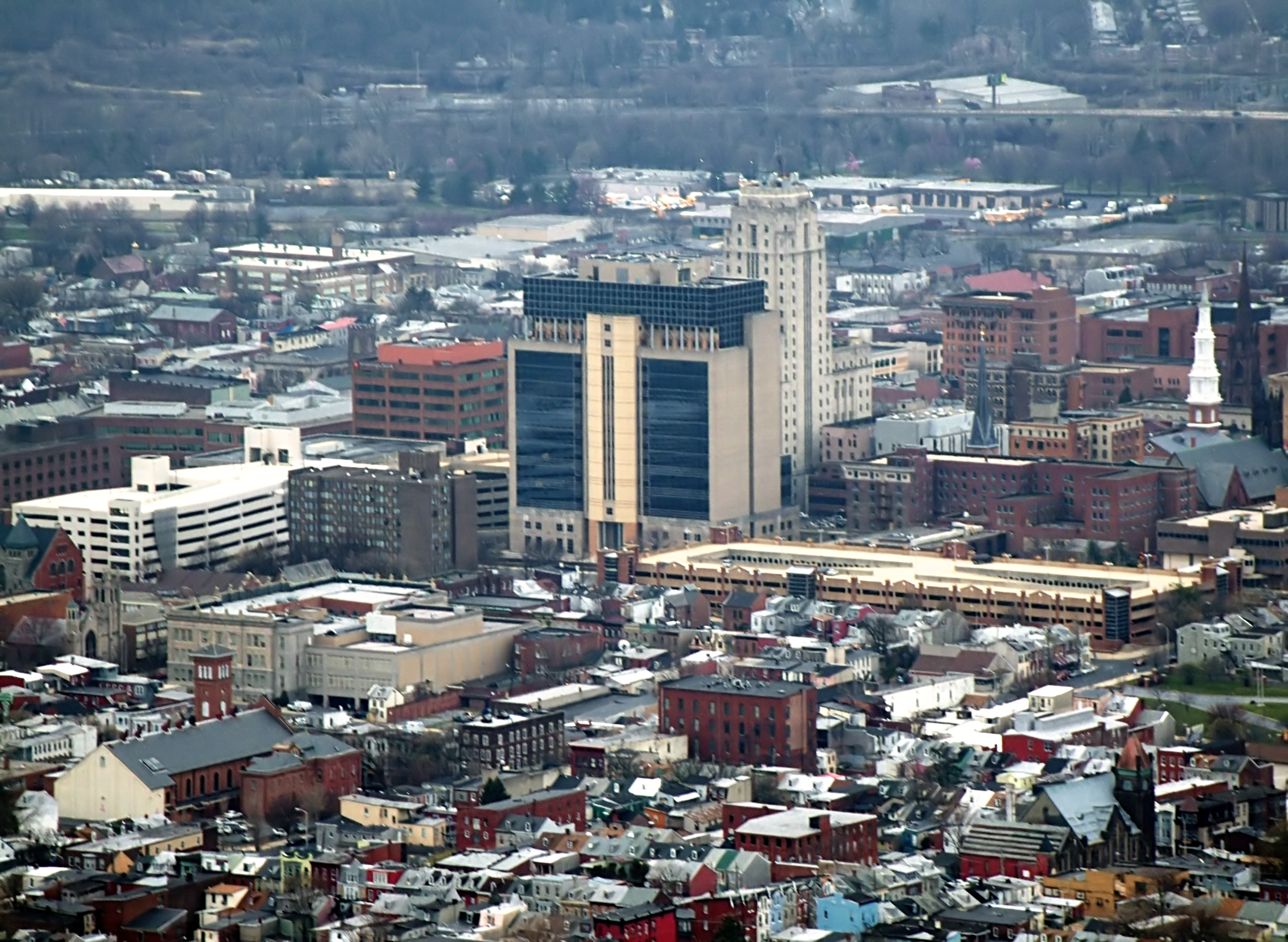
Downtown Reading in April 2011

The city's cultural institutions include the Reading Symphony Orchestra and its education project the Reading Symphony Youth Orchestra, the Reading Choral Society, Opus One: Berks Chamber Choir, Berks Sinfonietta Chamber Orchestra, Vox Philia Chamber Choir, the GoggleWorks Art Gallery, the Reading Public Museum and the Historical Society of Berks County.

Reading is the birthplace of graphic artist Jim Steranko, guitar virtuoso Richie Kotzen, novelist and poet John Updike, and poet Wallace Stevens. Marching band composer and writer John Philip Sousa, the March King, died in Reading's Abraham Lincoln Hotel in 1932. Artist Keith Haring was born in Reading.

In 1935, comedian Jackie Gleason began his professional career in Tiny's Chateau Nightclub, located inside Reading's Black Bear Inn.

Reading is home to the 17-time DCA world champion drum and bugle corps, The Reading Buccaneers.

In 1914, one of the anchors of the Battleship Maine was delivered from the Washington Navy Yard to City Park, off of Perkiomen Avenue. The anchor was dedicated during a ceremony presided over by Franklin D. Roosevelt, who was then assistant secretary of the navy.

Reading was home to several movie and theater palaces in the early 20th century. The Astor, Embassy, Loew's Colonial, and Rajah Shrine Theater were grand monuments of architecture and entertainment. Today, after depression, recession, and urban renewal, the Rajah is the only one to remain. The Astor Theater was demolished in 1998 to make way for The Sovereign Center. Certain steps were taken to retain mementos of the Astor, including its ornate Art Deco chandelier and gates. These are on display and in use inside the arena corridors, allowing insight into the ambiance of the former movie house. In 2000, the Rajah was purchased from the Shriners. After a much needed restoration, it was renamed the Sovereign Performing Arts Center. In 2013 the theatre and arena were rebranded as the Santander Performing Arts Center and Santander Arena respectively after Santander Bank purchased Sovereign.

The Mid-Atlantic Air Museum is a membership-supported museum and restoration facility located at Carl A. Spaatz Field. The museum actively displays and restores historic and rare war aircraft and civilian airliners. Most notable to their collection is a Northrop P-61 Black Widow under active restoration since its recovery from Mount Cyclops, New Guinea in 1989. Beginning in 1990, the museum has hosted "World War II Weekend Air Show", scheduled to coincide with D-Day. On display are period wartime aircraft (many of which fly throughout the show) vehicles, and weapons.

The mechanical ice cream scoop was invented in Reading by William Clewell in 1876. The 5th Avenue candy bar and York Peppermint Pattie were invented in Reading.

=== Attractions ===
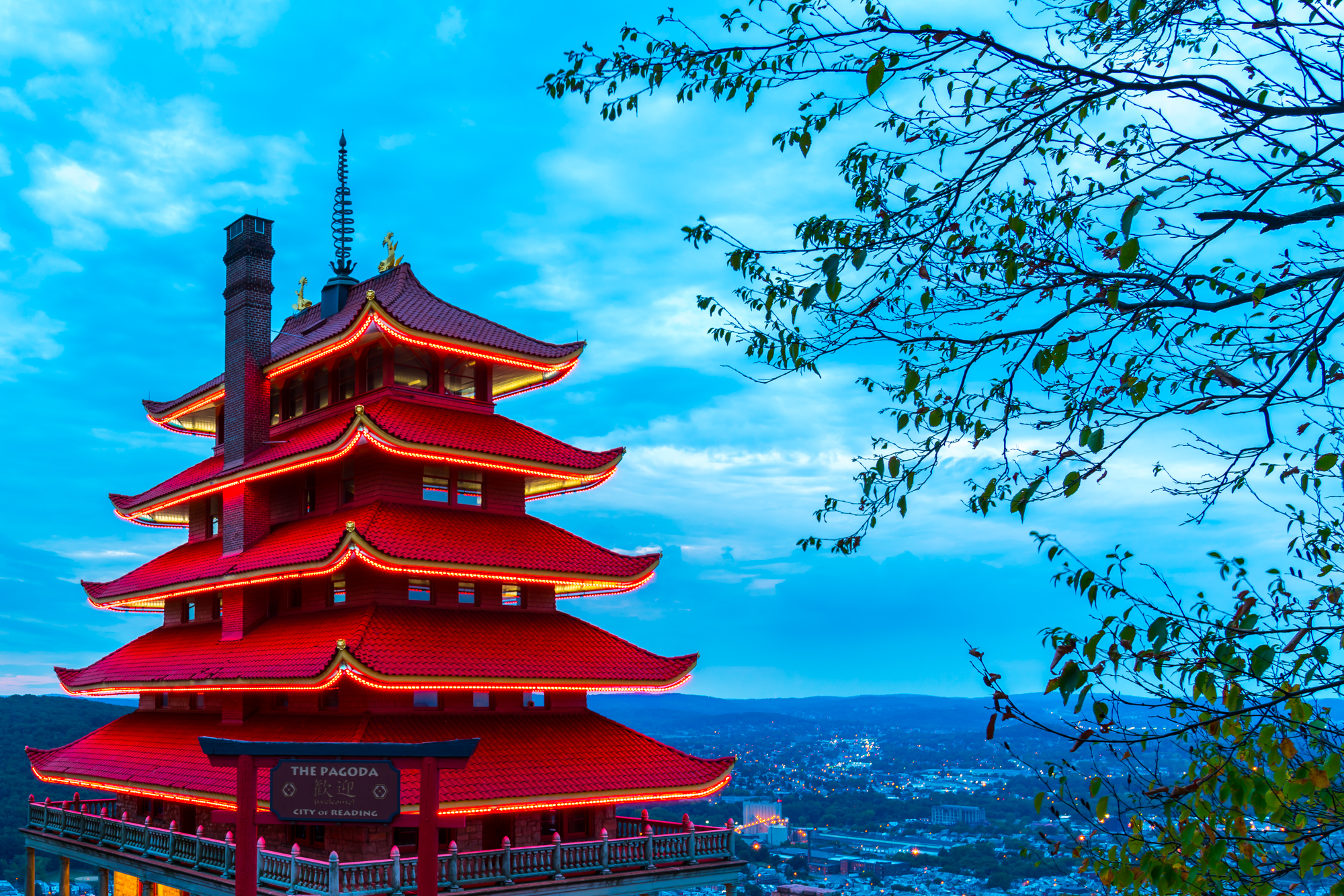
Reading's Pagoda

In 1908, a Japanese-style pagoda was built on Mount Penn, where it overlooks the city and is visible from almost everywhere in town. The Pagoda remains a popular tourist attraction.

Reading's City Park is home to several monuments and works of public art, including the Frederick Lauer Monument.

Another fixture in Reading's skyline is the William Penn Memorial Fire Tower, one mile from the Pagoda on Skyline Drive. Built in 1939 for fire department and forestry observation, the tower is 120 feet tall, and rises 950 feet above the intersection of fifth and Penn streets. From the top of the tower, it offers a 60-mile panoramic view.

The Reading Glove and Mitten Manufacturing Company founded in 1899, just outside Reading city limits, in West Reading and Wyomissing boroughs changed its name to Vanity Fair in 1911 and is now the major clothing manufacturer VF Corporation. In the early 1970s, the original factories were developed to create the VF Outlet Village, the first outlet mall in the United States. The VF Outlet closed in 2020.

GoggleWorks Center for the Arts is a community art and cultural resource center located in Reading, Pennsylvania. The mission of the GoggleWorks is "to transform lives through unique interactions with art." Located in the former Willson Goggle Factory building, GoggleWorks Center for the Arts features eight teaching studios in ceramics, hot and warm glass, metalsmithing, photography, printmaking, woodworking and virtual reality; 35 juried artist studios; and headquarters of over 40 cultural organizations. GoggleWorks also includes several exhibition galleries, a 130-seat film theatre, a bar/restaurant, and store featuring handcrafted works by over 200 artists working within the building and beyond. Admission and parking are always free. The building was added to the National Register of Historic Places in 2006.

== Sports ==
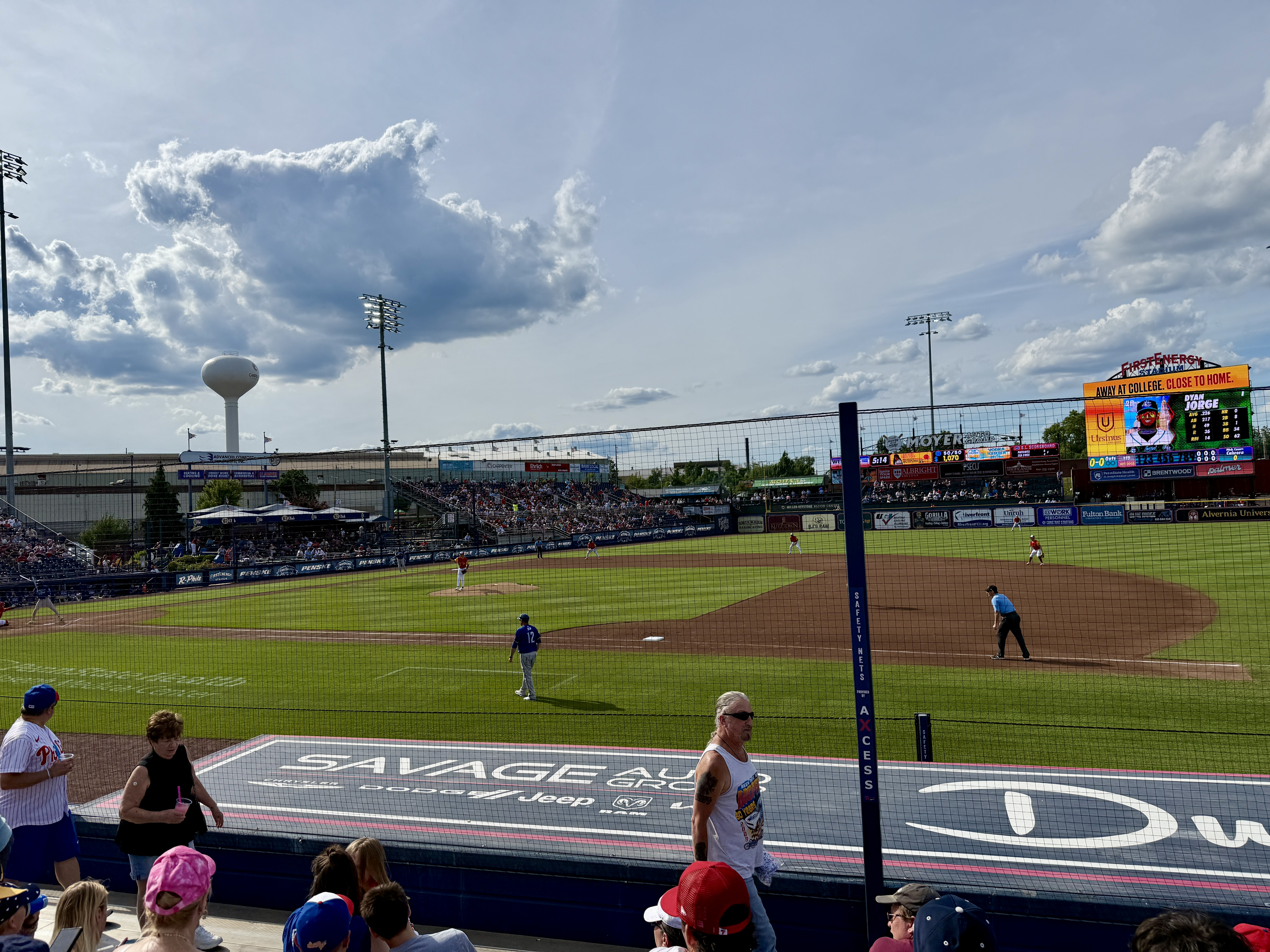
FirstEnergy Stadium, the home field of the Reading Fightin Phils, the Double-A affiliate of the Philadelphia Phillies, in 2026

The Reading Fightin Phils, minor league affiliate of the Philadelphia Phillies, play at FirstEnergy Stadium. Notable alumni are Larry Bowa, Ryne Sandberg, Mike Schmidt, Ryan Howard, and Jimmy Rollins.

The Reading Royals are a professional ice hockey team that currently plays in the ECHL. The team participates in the North Division of the ECHL's Eastern Conference and are a minor league affiliate of the Philadelphia Flyers. The Royals play their home games at the Santander Arena located in downtown Reading

Reading United AC, USL League Two affiliate of the Philadelphia Union, are considered one of the top amateur soccer teams in the United States. The team most recently played in the first PDL Championship in team history in 2018. Notable alumni include multiple players with United States men's national soccer team experience, including Matt Hedges, Alex Bono, CJ Sapong, Ben Sweat, and Keegan Rosenberry. Over 110 alumni from the team have gone on to play soccer professionally.

The city has been the residence of numerous professional athletes. Among these native to Reading are Brooklyn Dodgers outfielder Carl Furillo, Baltimore Colts running back Lenny Moore, and Philadelphia 76ers forward Donyell Marshall. Pro golfer Betsy King, a member of the World Golf Hall of Fame, was born in Reading.

The open-wheel racing portion of Penske Racing had been based in Reading, Pennsylvania since 1973 with the cars, during the F1 and CART era, being constructed in Poole, Dorset, England as well as being the base for the F1 team. On October 31, 2005, Penske Racing announced after the 2006 IRL season, they would consolidate IRL and NASCAR operations at the team's Mooresville, North Carolina facility; with the flooding in Pennsylvania in 2006, the team's operations were moved to Mooresville earlier than expected. Penske Truck Leasing is still based in Reading.

Maple Grove Raceway opened in 1962 and hosts a NHRA Camping World Drag Racing Series event since 1985.

Duryea Drive, which ascends Mount Penn in a series of switchbacks, was a testing place for early automobiles and was named for Charles Duryea. The Blue Mountain Region Sports Car Club of America hosts the Duryea Hill Climb, the longest in the Pennsylvania Hillclimb Association series, which follows the same route the automaker used to test his cars.

Reading played host to a stop on the PGA Tour, the Reading Open, in the late 1940s and early 1950s.

Club	Sport	League	Venue	Established	Championships
Reading Fightin Phils	Baseball	Eastern League	FirstEnergy Stadium	1967	4
Reading Royals	Ice hockey	ECHL	Santander Arena	2001	1
Reading United AC	Soccer	USL League Two	Gurski Stadium	1996	0
Reading Rebels	Basketball	94x50 League	Alvernia University	2022	0

== Government and politics ==
Steve Lutz won five seats on the Reading city council in the 1911 election and their mayoral candidate, Elwood Leffler, almost won, resulting in accusations of election fraud conducted against him. The Republican and Democratic parties united against the Socialists in the 1917 local elections. Reading became the third city in the United States to have a local government controlled by the Socialists after the 1927 election, with the election of J. Henry Stump as mayor and James H. Maurer to the city council. After the 1929 election, the Socialists gained control over the city council. The Socialists lost support during the Great Depression and were defeated by a united Republican and Democratic ticket in the 1931 election. Stump was defeated by Heber Ermentrout and the party was reduced to two seats on the city council. The Socialists lost their two seats on the city council in the 1933 election.

== Education ==
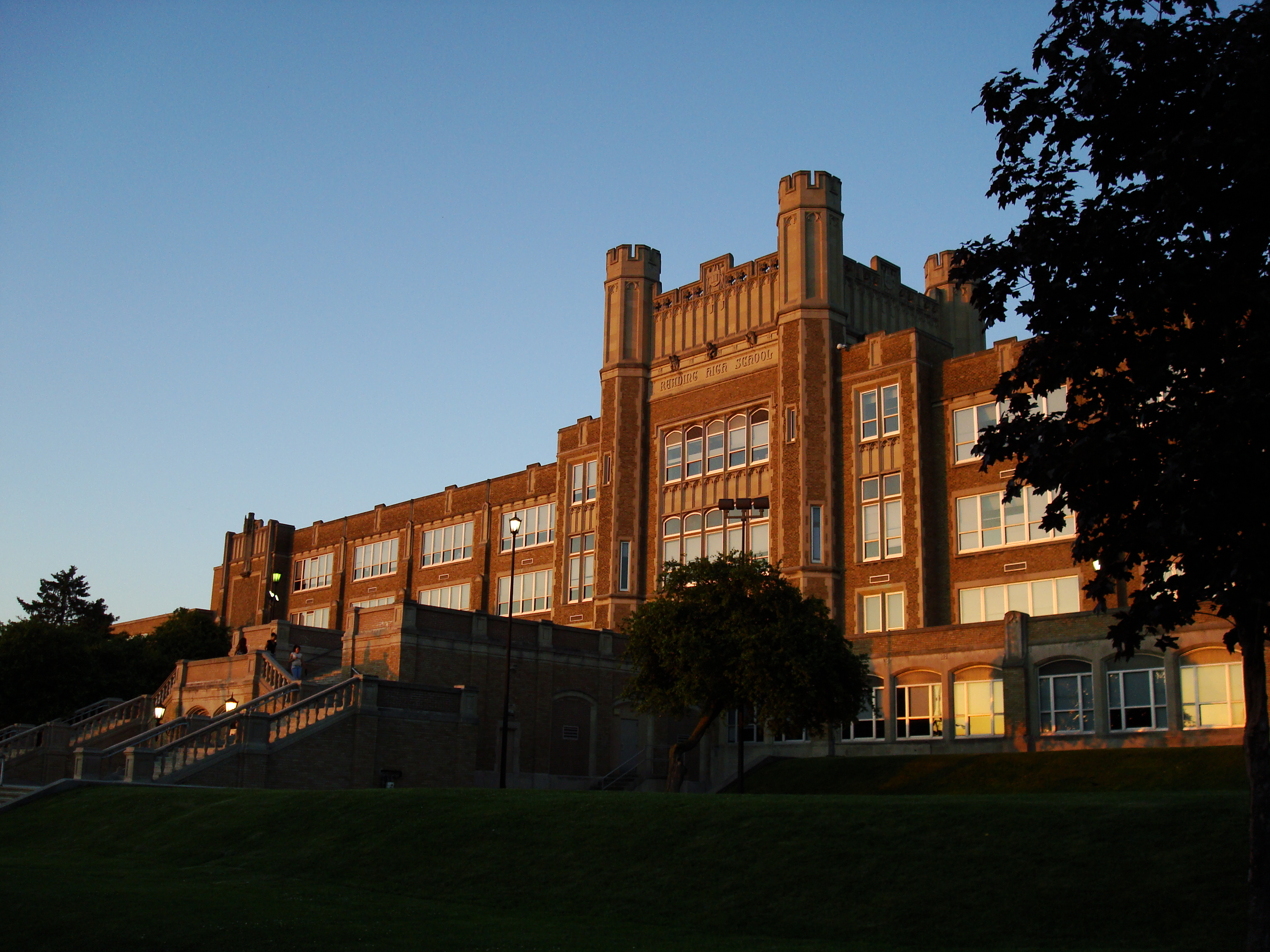
Reading Senior High School in May 2008

Reading School District provides elementary and middle schools for the city's children. As of 2023, Reading Senior High School, serving grades nine through 12, is the largest traditional high school in Pennsylvania with a student population of 5,498.

Three high schools serve the city:

- Berks Catholic High School (grades 9–12)
- Reading Senior High School (grades 9–12)
- Reading Intermediate High School (grade 8)

As of 2012, according to a report in The New York Times, approximately eight percent of Reading's residents had a college degree, compared to a national average of 28 percent.

Four institutions of higher learning are located in Reading:

- Albright College
- Alvernia University
- Penn State Berks
- Reading Area Community College

== Infrastructure ==
=== Roads and highways ===
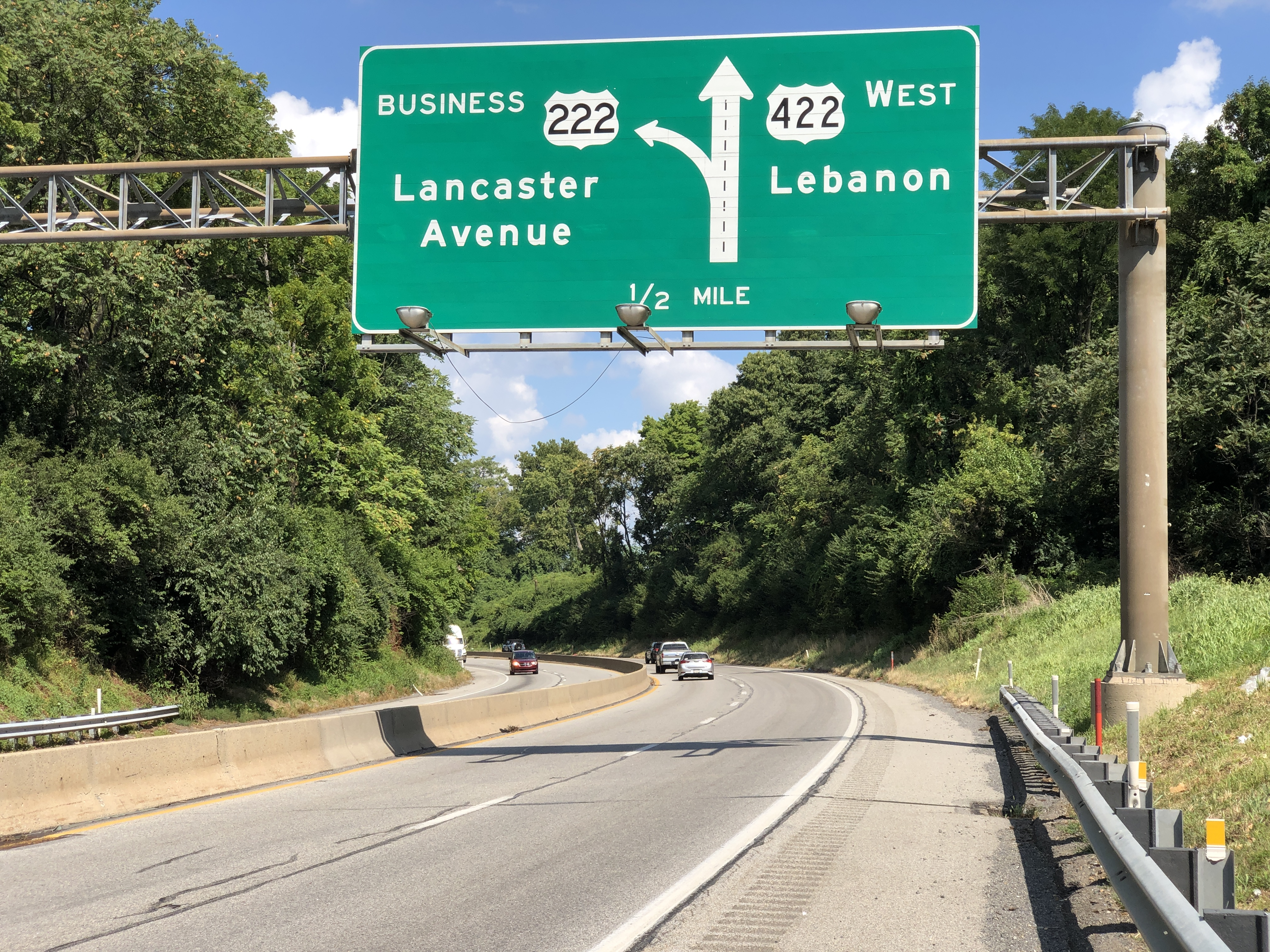
US 422 westbound in Reading

As of 2013, there were 157.48 miles (253.44 km) of public roads in Reading, of which 25.33 miles (40.76 km) were maintained by the Pennsylvania Department of Transportation (PennDOT) and 132.15 miles (212.67 km) were maintained by the city.

A number of federal and state highways allow entry to and egress from Reading. U.S. Route 422, the major east–west artery, circles the western edge of the city and is known locally as The West Shore Bypass. Various interchanges allow for vehicles on US 422 to enter the City of Reading and vice versa, with the most notable interchange bringing vehicles on and off of the Penn Street Bridge, a historic bridge considered to be the primary gateway to downtown Reading. US 422 leads west to Lebanon and east to Pottstown. U.S. Route 222 bypasses the city to the west, leading southwest to Lancaster and northeast to Allentown. Interstate 176 heads south from US 422 near Reading and leads to the Pennsylvania Turnpike (Interstate 76) in Morgantown. Pennsylvania Route 12 is known as the Warren Street Bypass, as it bypasses downtown Reading to the northwest. PA 12 begins at US 422/US 222 in Wyomissing and heads northeast on the Warren Street Bypass before becoming Pricetown Road and leading northeast to Pricetown. Pennsylvania Route 10 is known as Morgantown Road and heads south from Reading parallel to I-176 to Morgantown. Pennsylvania Route 61 heads north from Reading on Centre Avenue and leads to Pottsville. Pennsylvania Route 183 heads northwest from Reading on Schuylkill Avenue and Bernville Road, leading to Bernville. U.S. Route 222 Business is designated as Lancaster Avenue, Bingaman Street, South 4th Street, and 5th Street through Reading. U.S. Route 422 Business is designated as Penn Street, Washington Street (westbound), Franklin Street (eastbound), and Perkiomen Avenue through Reading.

=== Public transportation ===
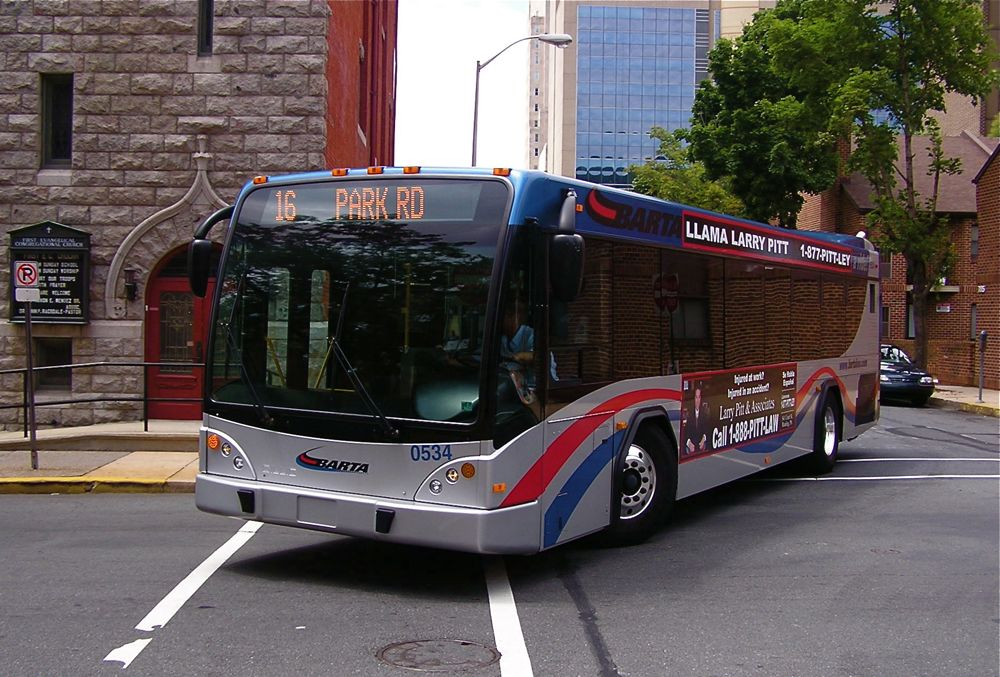
A BARTA bus in downtown Reading

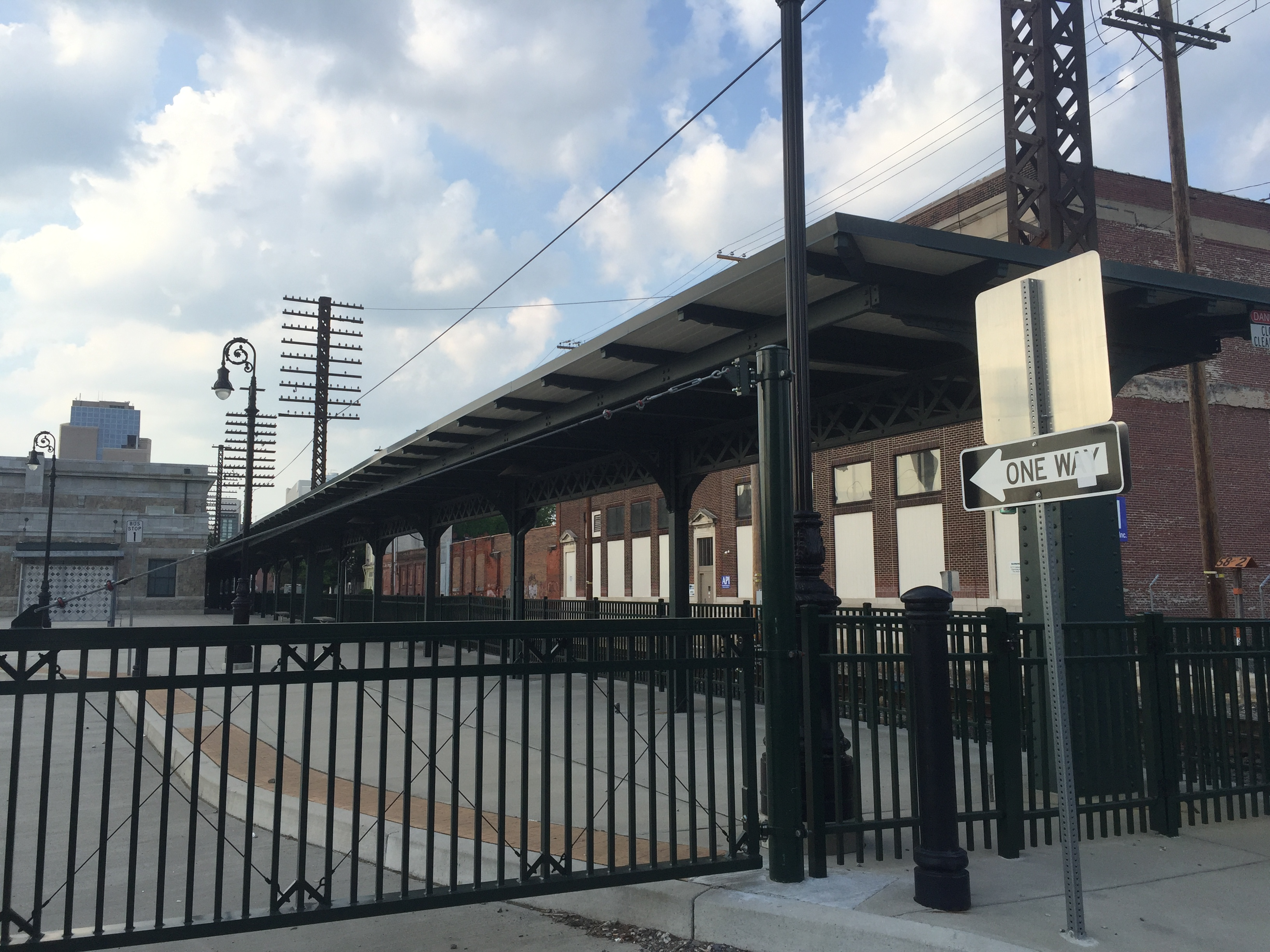
Franklin Street station at Franklin and 7th streets

Public transit in Reading and its surrounding communities has been provided since 1973 by the Berks Area Regional Transportation Authority (BARTA). BARTA operates a fleet of 50 buses (all hybrid electric buses) serving 20 routes, mostly originating at the BARTA Transportation Center in Downtown Reading. BARTA also provides paratransit service in addition to fixed route service. The former Reading Railroad Franklin Street Station was refurbished and reopened to bus service on September 9, 2013, with buses running the express route back and forth to Lebanon Transit. The route to Lebanon was discontinued after a short period, resulting in the refurbished station sitting vacant.

Klein Transportation provides bus service to Reading from a stop in downtown Reading and a stop at the Boscov's at the former Fairgrounds Square Mall to Douglassville, Kutztown, Wescosville, Hellertown, and Midtown Manhattan in New York City. Transport Azumah provides bus service from the InterCity Bus Terminal to New York City. Amtrak Thruway bus service operated by Krapf Coaches ran from the BARTA Transportation Center in Reading to 30th Street Station in Philadelphia, with an intermediate stop in Pottstown, until it was discontinued on March 18, 2025. The Uptown Vans network offers service to Newark, New Jersey, Union City, New Jersey, and New York City.

Reading and the surrounding area is serviced by the Reading Regional Airport, a general aviation airfield. The three-letter airport code for Reading is RDG. Scheduled commercial airline service to Reading ended in 2004, when the last airline, USAir stopped flying into Reading.

Freight rail service in Reading is provided by the Norfolk Southern Railway, the Reading Blue Mountain and Northern Railroad, and the East Penn Railroad. Norfolk Southern Railway serves Reading along the Harrisburg Line, which runs east to Philadelphia and west to Harrisburg, and the Reading Line, which runs northeast to Allentown. Norfolk Southern Railway operates the Reading Yard in Reading. The Reading Blue Mountain and Northern Railroad operates the Reading Division line from an interchange with the Norfolk Southern Railway in Reading north to Port Clinton and Packerton. The East Penn Railroad operates the Lancaster Northern line from Sinking Spring southwest to Ephrata, using trackage rights along Norfolk Southern Railway east from Sinking Spring to an interchange with the Norfolk Southern Railway in Reading.

Passenger trains ran between Pottsville, Reading, Pottstown, and Philadelphia along the Pottsville Line until July 27, 1981, when transit operator SEPTA curtailed commuter service to electrified lines. Since then, there have been repeated calls for the resumption of the services.

In the late 1990s and up to 2003, SEPTA, in cooperation with Reading-based BARTA, funded a study called the Schuylkill Valley Metro which included plans to extend SEPTA's R6 passenger line to Pottstown, Reading, and Wyomissing, Pennsylvania. The project suffered a major setback when it was rejected by the Federal Transit Administration New Starts program, which cited doubts about the ridership projections and financing assumptions used by the study. With the recent surge in gasoline prices and ever-increasing traffic, the planning commissions of Montgomery County and Berks County have teamed to study the feasibility of a simple diesel shuttle train between the Manayunk/Norristown Line and Pottstown/Reading. In 2018, a panel led by the Greater Reading Chamber Alliance pushed for an extension of the Manayunk/Norristown Line to Reading along existing Norfolk Southern freight railroad tracks, with service terminating either at the Franklin Street Station in Reading or in Wyomissing. In 2020, the Pennsylvania Department of Transportation conducted a feasibility study on passenger train service from Reading to Philadelphia. In 2021, Amtrak announced a plan to implement intercity train service from Reading to Philadelphia and New York City, mostly following the Norfolk Southern line between Reading and Philadelphia and the Northeast Corridor between Philadelphia and New York City. In April 2022, the commissions of Berks, Chester, and Montgomery County voted to establish the Schuylkill River Passenger Rail Authority to oversee the restoration of Philadelphia-Reading passenger rail service on the former Reading Railroad right-of-way.

=== Utilities ===
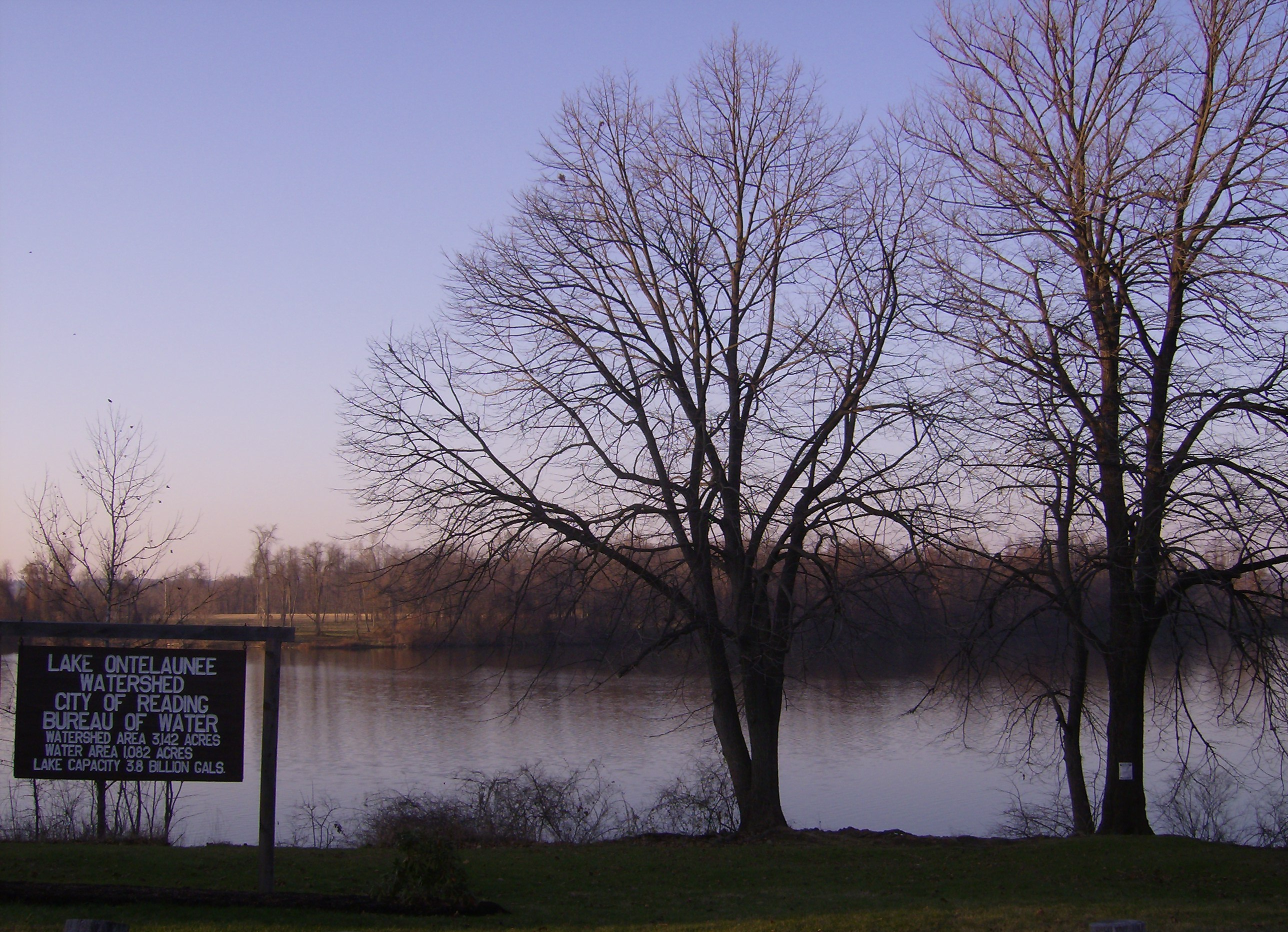
Lake Ontelaunee, a primary water supplier to Reading

Electricity in Reading is provided by Met-Ed, a subsidiary of FirstEnergy. Natural gas service in the city is provided by UGI Utilities. The Reading Area Water Authority provides water to the city, with the city's water supply coming from Lake Ontelaunee and the city's water treated at the Maidencreek Filter Plant. The Reading Water Company was founded in 1821 to supply water to the city. The Reading Area Water Authority was established on May 20, 1994, to take over the water system in the city. Sewer service is provided by the city's Public Works department, with a wastewater treatment plant owned by the city located on Fritz Island. The city's Public Works department provides trash and recycling collection to Reading.

=== Health care ===
Hospitals serving the Reading area include Reading Hospital in West Reading and Penn State Health St. Joseph in Bern Township. Reading Hospital offers an emergency department with a Level I trauma center and various services including Cancer Care, Heart Center, Orthopedic Services, Pediatrics, Primary Care, and Women's Health. Penn State Health St. Joseph offers an emergency department, heart institute, cancer center, stroke center, wound center, orthopedics, and primary care physicians.

=== Fire department ===
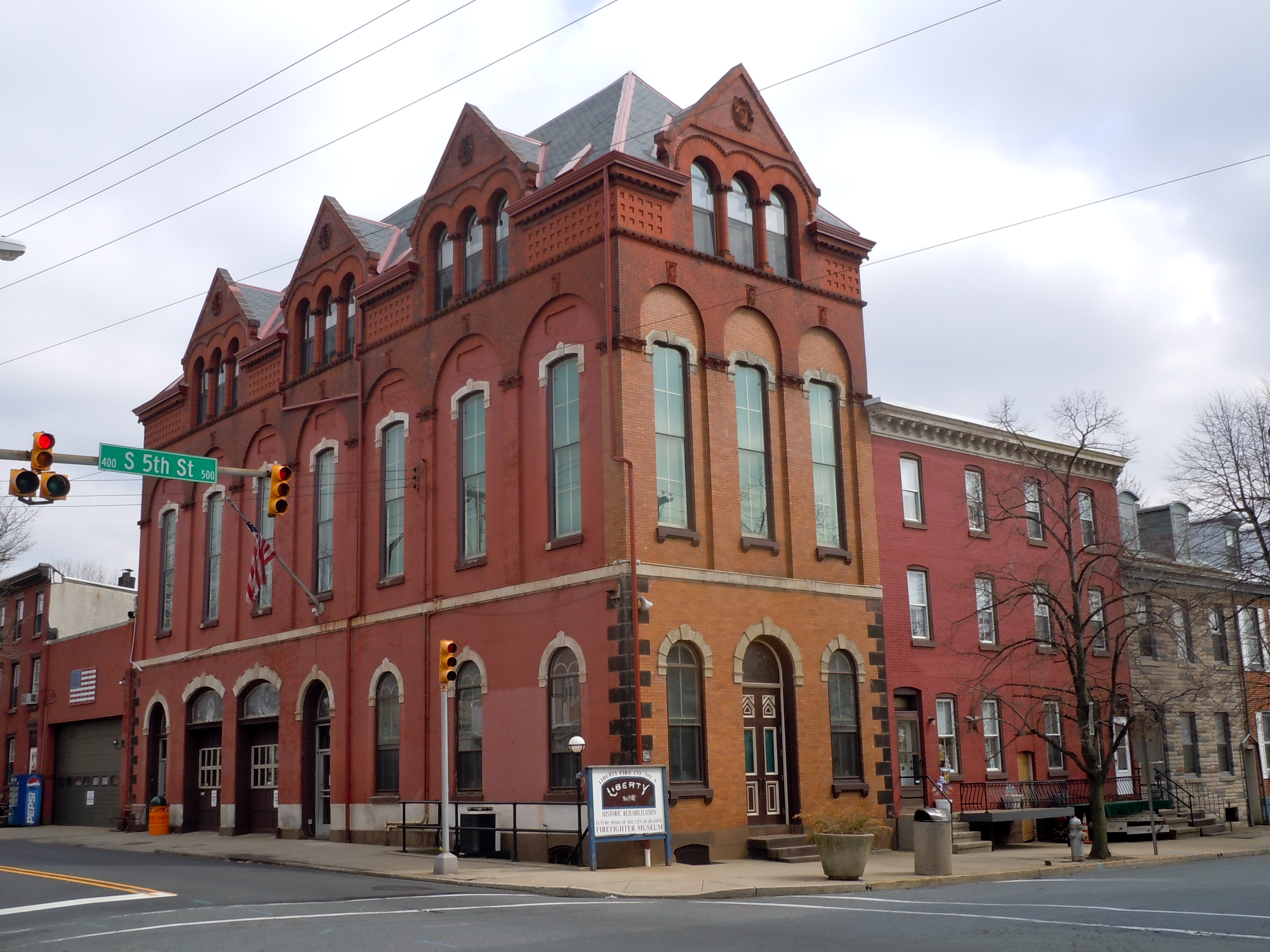
Reading Fire Museum

The city of Reading is protected by the 135 firefighters and paramedics of the Reading Fire and EMS Department (RFD). The RFD operates out of seven fire stations throughout the city. The RFD operates a fire apparatus fleet of five engine companies, three ladder companies, one rescue company, brush unit, and four front-line medic ambulances. In 2018, fire units responded to 9,992 incidents. EMS responses totaled 19,505 calls for service. Department staffing is only two firefighters per apparatus.

== In popular culture ==
- The Pulitzer Prize winning play Sweat by Lynn Nottage is set in Reading.

== Sister city ==
Reading and Reutlingen, Germany are sister cities which participate in student exchanges. Students from Reading Senior High School can apply to become a part of the exchange and travel to Reutlingen for two weeks (mid-September to early October) and in return host German exchange students in the spring. Kutztown University of Pennsylvania in Kutztown, Pennsylvania also has a program with Reutlingen.

Reading is twinned with:

- Reutlingen, Baden-Württemberg, Germany, since 1998
- Changzhi, Shanxi, China, since 1992
