= Wyomissing Foundation =

- Formation: 1928
- Type: Private foundation Educational organization
- Headquarters: Wyomissing, PA, United States
- President: Karen Rightmire
- Key people: Virginia Rush; Patricia Swavely; Patricia Giles
- Revenue: $2,552,425 (2015)
- Expenses: $1,750,714 (2015)
- Website: www.wyomissingfoundation.org

Wyomissing Foundation is a private 501(c)(3) foundation in Wyomissing, Pennsylvania, United States. It was established in 1928 by three local businesspeople who had founded hosiery manufacturing company Berkshire Knitting Mills, later known as Wyomissing Industries. Grants from the foundation helped establish the Berks County Community Foundation, which was founded in 1994. In 2001, the Wyomissing Foundation donated a copy of Saving Pennsylvania, a video about the dangers of urban sprawl, to every public library in Pennsylvania. In 2008, the Foundation also helped support development of the Berks County Citizens Academy, a project to educate potential volunteer members of county and municipal advisory boards and authorities about local and county government issues.

The foundation's offices are located in a renovated historic mill. Earlier grants by the foundation included one in the early 1930s to help pay for a memorial in Krefeld, Germany, to early German settlers in what is now the United States and, in 1953, financial support for an exhibit of 90 American paintings in Germany.
