= Pagoda (Reading, Pennsylvania) =

Novelty building in Reading, Pennsylvania, US

- Reading Pagoda
- U.S. National Register of Historic Places
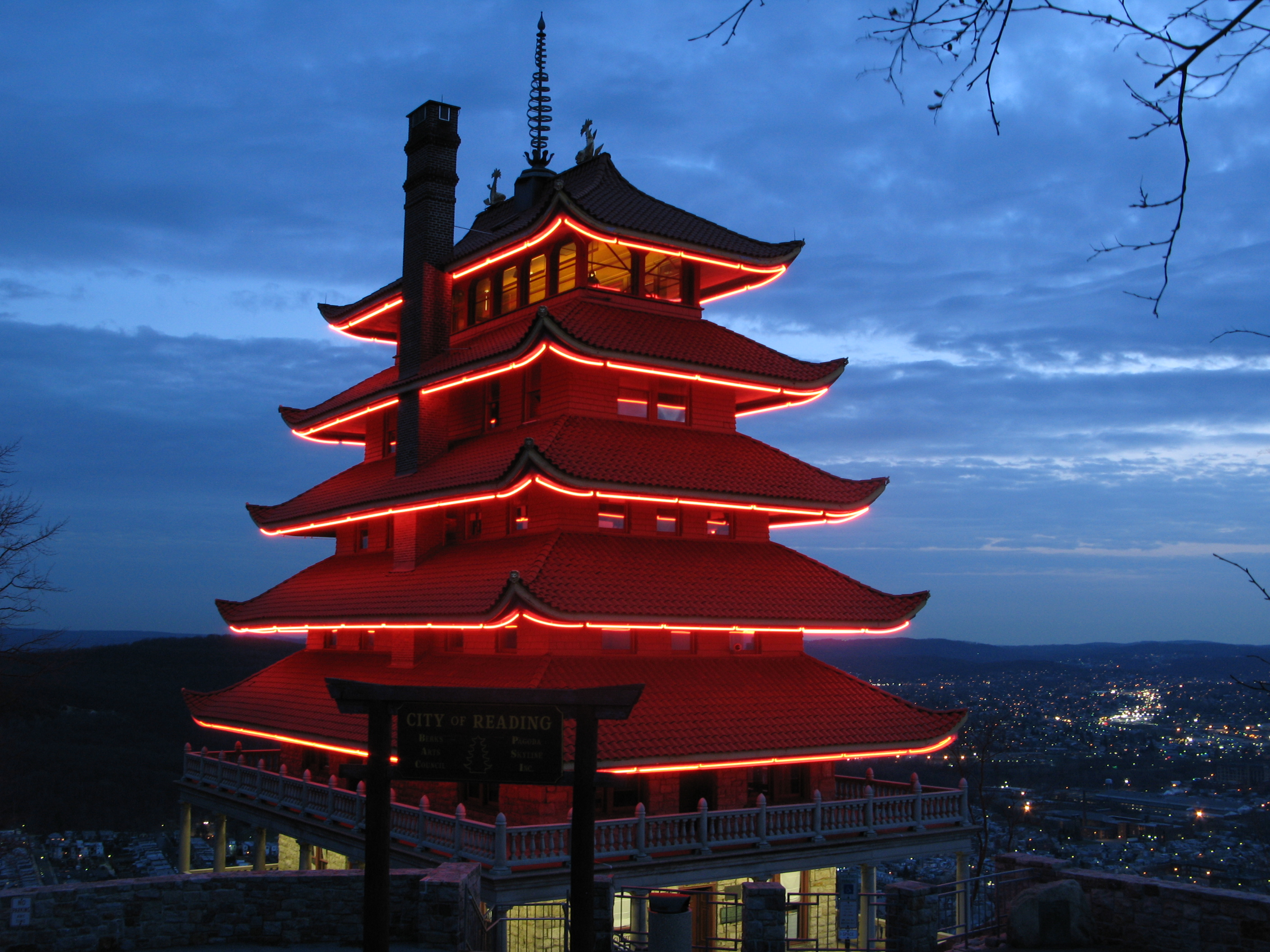
- the Pagoda Logo for the building by the Foundation for the Reading Pagoda

- Location within Pennsylvania Location within the United States
- Location: 98 Duryea Drive, Reading, Pennsylvania, U.S.
- Coordinates: 40°20′9″N 75°54′22″W
- Built: 1907-08
- NRHP reference No.: 72001093
- Added to NRHP: November 7, 1972

The Reading Pagoda is a novelty building, built atop the south end of Mount Penn overlooking Reading, Pennsylvania, United States. It has been a symbol of the city for more than a century.

== History ==
The pagoda was completed in 1908 at a cost of $50,000, intended to be the hotel/restaurant centerpiece of a luxury resort. When plans for the rest of the resort were abandoned, the 7-story wooden building on 10 acres (4.0 ha) of land was donated to Reading in 1911. It is now part of the municipally owned 1,595-acre (645 ha) Mount Penn Preserve.

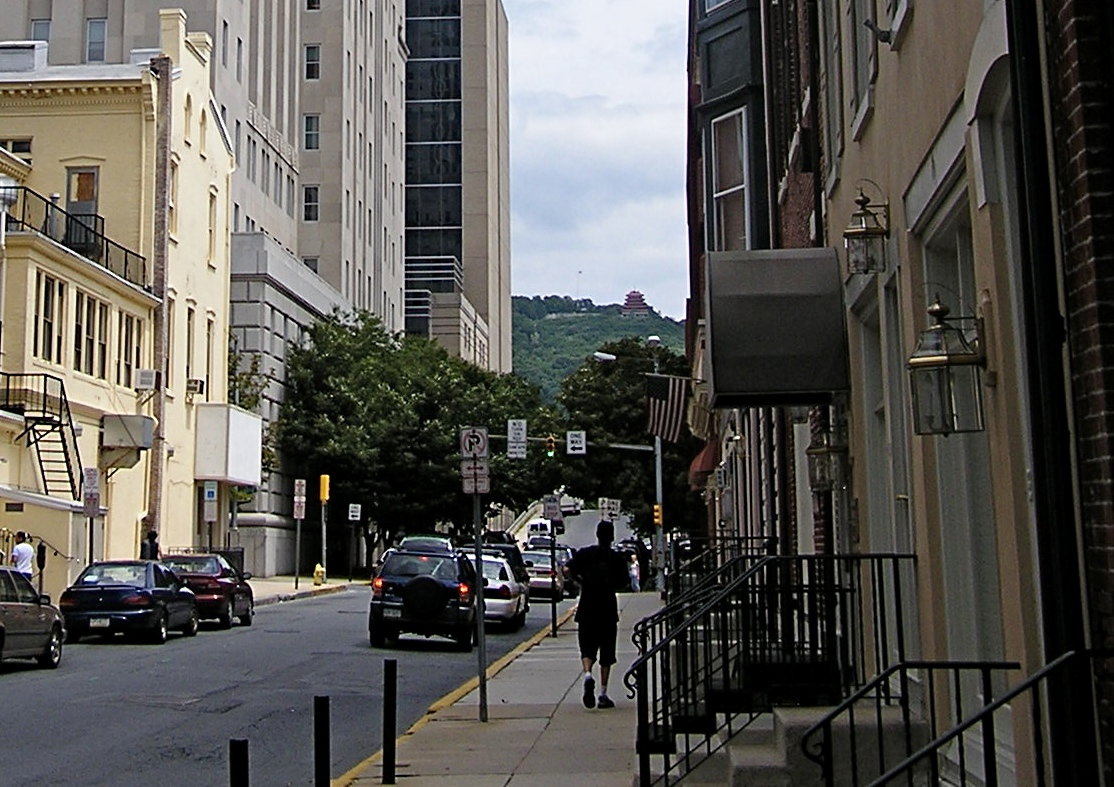
Court Street in downtown Reading, with the Pagoda in the background

The Pagoda is 28 feet (8.5 m) wide, 50 feet (15 m) long, and 72 feet (22 m) tall. Perched on the edge of a cliff, 620 feet (190 m) above the city and 886 feet (270 m) above sea level, it offers a 30-mile (48 km) panoramic view of the city and the surrounding countryside.

Within the top story hangs a tocsin, a massive bell cast in Obata, Mie Prefecture, Japan, in 1739, and formerly installed in a Buddhist temple in either Ogose or Hannō, Saitama Prefecture, just north of Tokyo. Listed on the bell's sides in Japanese characters are the names of its 48 donors and a prophecy about the end of time. The temple was closed in 1881, and later destroyed.

Anti-Japanese sentiment was rampant during World War II, and there were calls to demolish the building. But it was restored in 1949, with the lower story and balconies rebuilt in stone. In 1960, neon lights were installed outlining its roofs. In the 1970s, the Japanese garden was restored, and Japanese cherry trees were planted around the building. LED lights were installed in 2008-09. A webcam on its third floor periodically records and publishes the weather atop Mount Penn.

The Pagoda is owned by the City of Reading but is managed and preserved by the Foundation for the Reading Pagoda. It functions as an icon for the City of Reading. The Pagoda is also the home of Pagoda Skyline, Inc., a non-profit volunteer organization formed in 1969 to help with the restoration and preservation of the Pagoda, the William Penn Memorial Fire Tower and Skyline Drive.

It was added to the National Register of Historic Places in 1972.

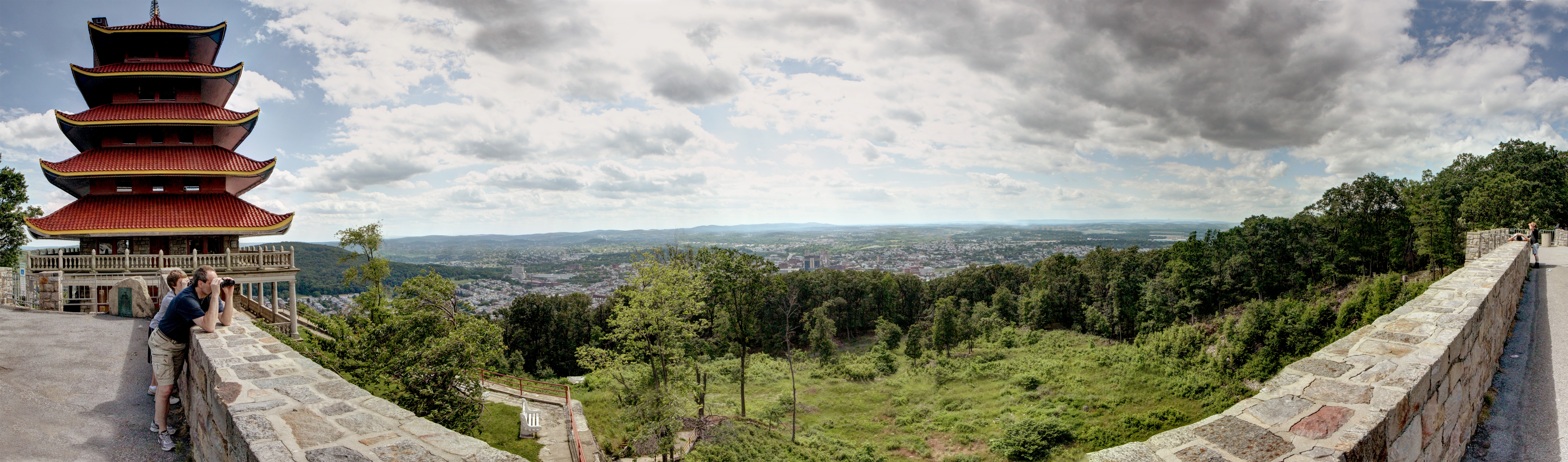
Panorama of the Pagoda area and nearby Reading

== See also ==
- National Register of Historic Places listings in Berks County, Pennsylvania
