= William Penn Memorial Fire Tower =

Fire lookout tower in Pennsylvania, United States

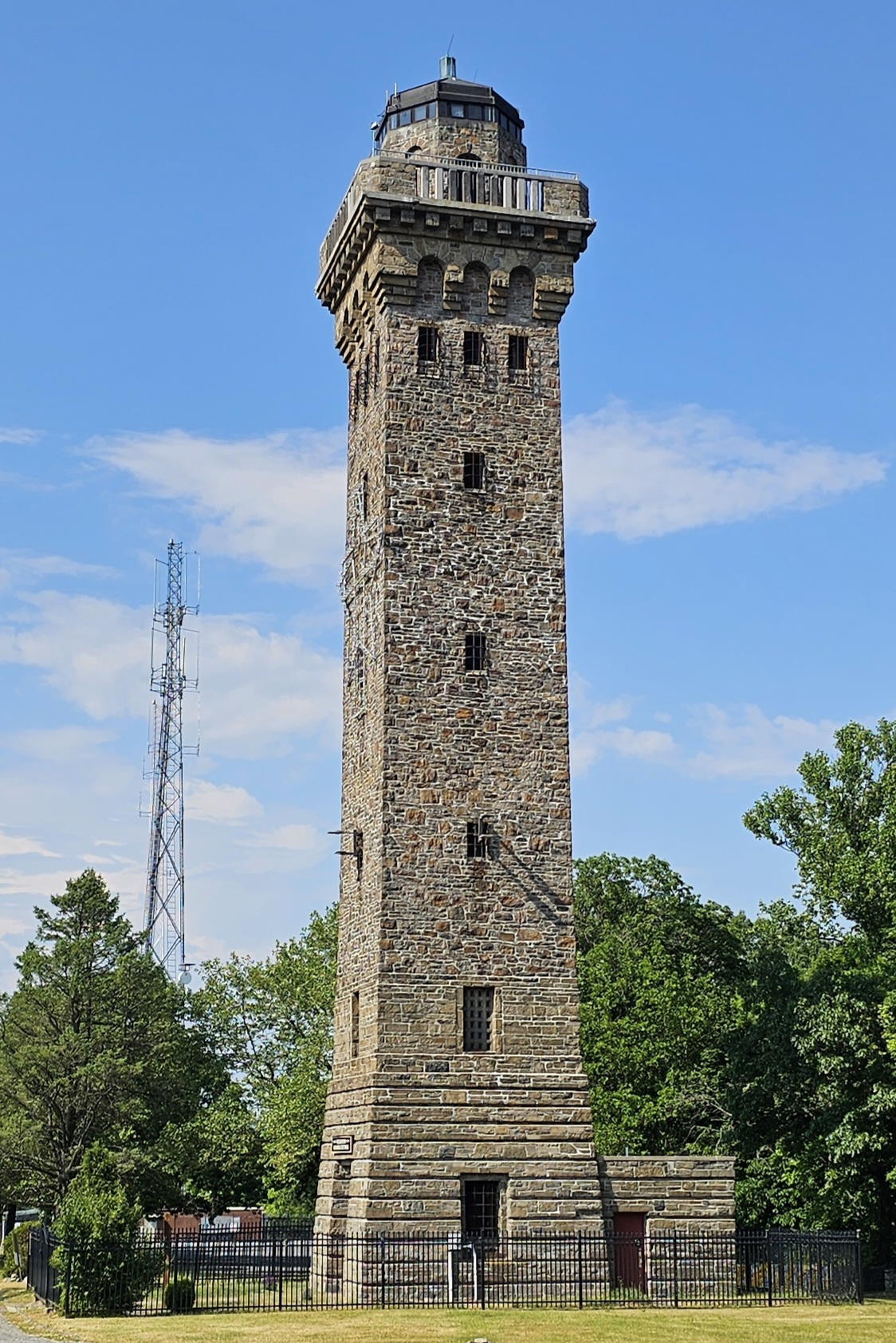
- The tower in 2023
- Interactive map of the William Penn Memorial Fire Tower area

General information
- Type: Fire lookout tower
- Location: Lower Alsace Township, Pennsylvania, U.S., 2500 Skyline Drive
- Coordinates: 40°20′50.1″N 75°54′8.7″W
- Construction started: December 9, 1938
- Completed: August 1939
- Opened: October 28, 1939; October 28, 2004 (reopening)
- Renovated: 2000
- Closed: September 1988
- Cost: $33,536

Height
- Height: 120 ft (37 m)

Design and construction
- Architect: Grover Cleveland Freeman

The William Penn Memorial Fire Tower is a fire lookout tower located on Mount Penn in Lower Alsace Township, Pennsylvania. Named after William Penn, the structure is owned by the city government of nearby Reading, Pennsylvania, which the tower overlooks. Work on the structure began in late 1938 as a project of the Works Progress Administration (WPA), with the tower completed the following year. The tower remained in regular use, both as a tourist attraction and as a legitimate lookout tower, for the next several decades, although deterioration to the building caused it to be closed in 1988.

Starting in the late 1990s, a local nonprofit group began working to restore the tower, and it was reopened in 2004. The tower is listed on the National Historic Lookout Register, having been added in 1999.

== Site ==
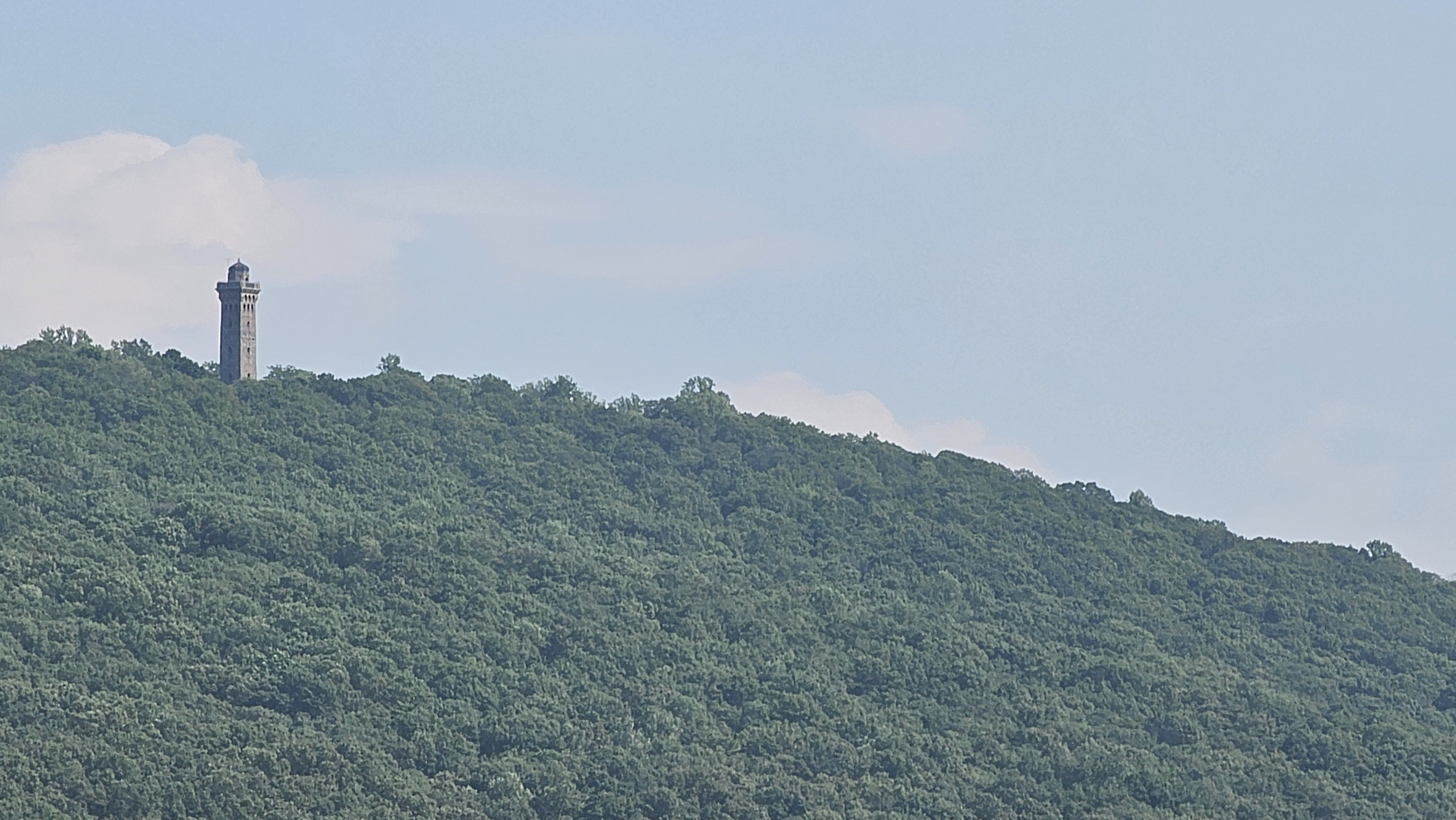
The tower on Mount Penn in 2023

The tower is located at 2500 Skyline Drive in the Mount Penn Preserve of Lower Alsace Township, Pennsylvania. Located near the summit of Mount Penn at 1,239 ft (378 m) above sea level, the tower offers a 60-mile (97 km) radius view of the surrounding area, which, in addition to the nearby city of Reading, includes the Blue Mountain, the Delaware Water Gap, and Valley Forge.

The tower is owned by the city government of Reading, although it does not own the surrounding property, which includes a perimeter fence. It is approximately 1 mi (1.6 km) down the street from the Pagoda, a notable nearby landmark.

The site of the tower is the location of a former tower that had been built by the Mount Penn Gravity Railroad Company in 1889. The company operated a scenic railway tour along the mountain ridge and the tower had been constructed as a tourist attraction, offering scenic vistas. A hotel was also constructed during this time and stood from 1891 to 1959, when it was razed. The site of the hotel is today a cement platform near the current tower. The original tower operated from 1890 to 1923, when the wooden structure was destroyed in a purported act of arson.

== Architecture ==
The tower stands 120 ft (37 m) tall and is made entirely of fireproof material, primarily concrete, stone, and steel. The interior of the tower includes a 168-step steel stairway leading to the top, which consists of a glass-walled observation room equipped with 16 spotlights. This glass wall is surrounded by an exterior iron observation deck and is capped by a round copper dome. Decorative elements inside the tower include stained-glass windows and a Moravian tile decoration of the Penn family crest. The exterior of the tower includes a perimeter fence and a walkway that has a piece of decorative art depicting William Penn holding the Pennsylvania Charter.

== History ==
=== Construction ===
The idea for the fire lookout tower began in the late 1930s as part of an effort by Reading, Pennsylvania to create jobs in the midst of the Great Depression, as well as out of concern for the safety of the forest land that was owned by the city and county. On September 15, 1938, the city received a grant from the federal government of $15,091 through the Works Progress Administration to help fund the construction of the tower. An additional $18,445 was provided by the city government of Reading, for a total construction cost of $33,536. In addition to the tower, the WPA financing helped with the construction of a stone wall along Skyline Drive. The architect for the project was Grover Cleveland Freeman of Lower Alsace Township. He drew design inspiration for the tower by studying over half a dozen other fire lookout towers, including one from Saint Paul, Minnesota. Construction began on December 9, 1938, reutilizing the foundation for the previous tower built by the Gravity Railroad company. Ironwork was completed by the Bachman Iron Works of Reading, and all stone used in the tower's erection was quarried from the mountain. The highest paid workers on the project, consisting of engineers and iron workers, received an hourly rate of $1.37 ($29 in 2022). The construction of the tower came during a boom period of fire lookout tower construction in Pennsylvania, with a total of 150 such towers standing in the state by the late 1940s.

=== Opening ===
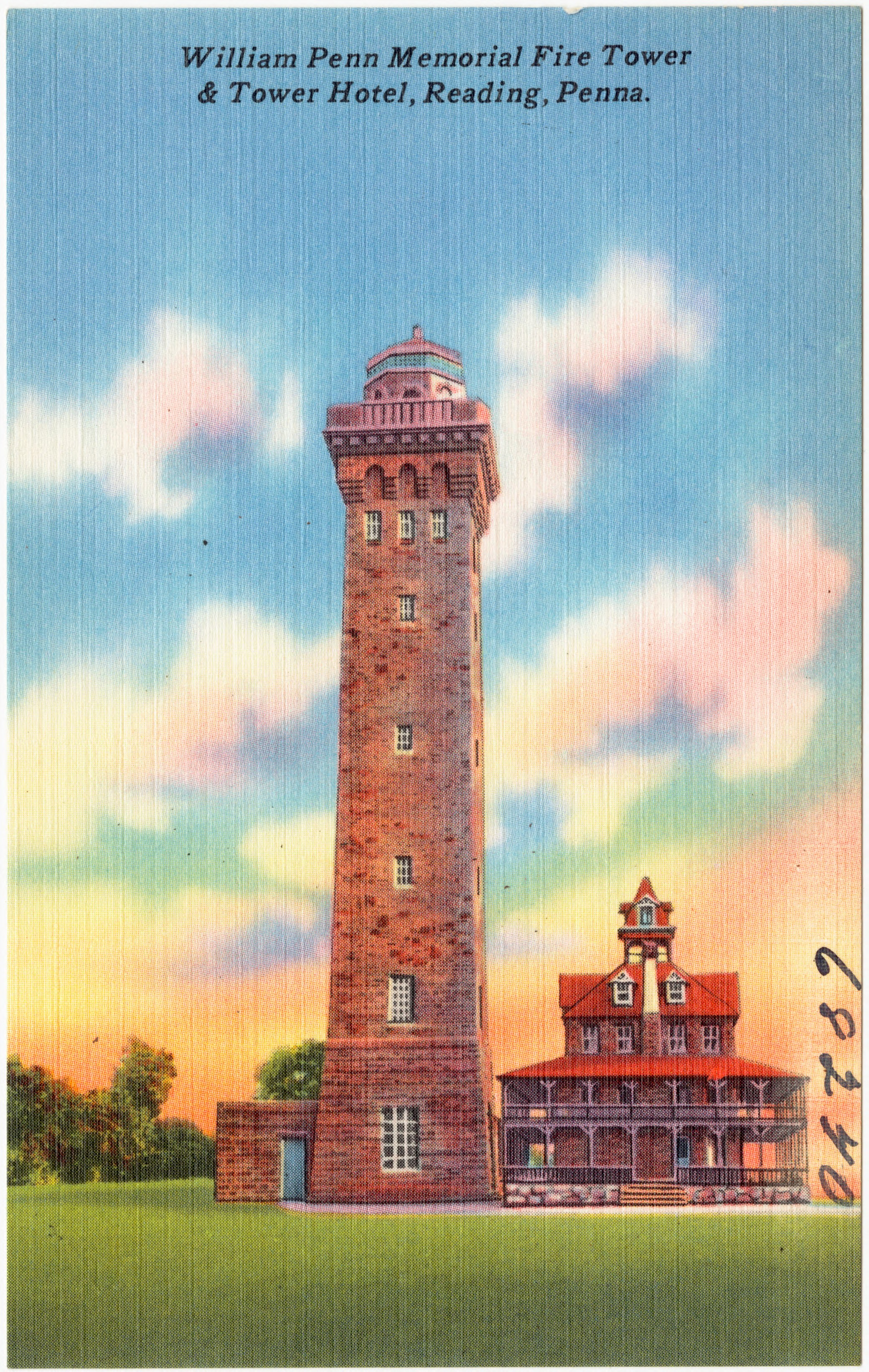
Postcard for the lookout tower and nearby hotel, c. 1945

Construction on the tower was completed in August 1939. Prior to the tower's opening, a naming contest was held which was won by Tony Pietrovito, who stated that he came up with the name after watching a play about William Penn performed by students at Reading Senior High School. The tower officially opened to the public on October 28, 1939. The tower proved to be a popular tourist destination, as within its first two months of operation, over 80,000 people visited, with contemporary claims that there had been visitors from every U.S. state. For many years after its opening, the Walker family served as caretakers and wardens for the tower, which saw regular usage by the Pennsylvania Department of Conservation and Natural Resources (DCNR). In later years, decorative elements, such as stained glass and tile mosaics, were added to the tower.

=== Disrepair and restoration ===
In the years following its opening, the tower began to decline in popularity as a tourist attraction, and advances in communication led to a decline in the importance of the tower as a fire safety measure. Additionally, with minimal upkeep, the tower began to fall into a state of disrepair. In September 1988, one month short of the tower's 49th anniversary, the state government announced that it would close the tower to the public and stop using it for fire safety after a person was trapped in the tower following a stair collapse.

In the late 1990s, calls to restore the nearby Pagoda led to renewed interest in also restoring the fire tower. In 1998, Pagoda-Skyline, Inc., a nonprofit group dedicated to preserving the Pagoda, began to investigate efforts to restore the tower, with initial cost estimates of about $1 million ($1800000 in 2022). By this point, much of the existing stairway had rusted to the point of no longer being usable. The following year, on October 30, the tower was listed on the National Historic Lookout Register. In 2000, Pagoda-Skyline began to raise funds to restore the tower, and later that year, the stairs were replaced. Much of the masonry work for the restoration was performed by the Eshbach Brothers, while Bachman Iron Works, who had worked on the tower during its original construction, again did the iron working.

On October 28, 2004, on the tower's 65th anniversary, the building was reopened to the public on a limited basis. Since then, Pagoda-Skyline has partnered with many local groups, such as the Baird Ornithological Club and the DCNR, to hold events at the tower. It is also a popular site for geocaching. In 2014, a new fence was added around the tower. In 2019, Berks Community Television reported that the main issue facing continued preservation to the tower is moisture, as the tower is unheated and moisture accumulation in the tower poses a threat to the metal stairs. In 2020, the city of Reading closed the tower to the general public due to the COVID-19 pandemic. In 2023, the metal fence surrounding the property was damaged by vandals who drove through the fence.
