= Opus One: Berks Chamber Choir =

Opus One: Berks Chamber Choir is a non-profit community choral ensemble based in Reading, Pennsylvania.

The SATB Choir is Opus One's flagship ensemble. It is composed of 20-25 singers and performs repertoire of various genres, languages, and time periods. The group not only tackles unaccompanied selections but normally features a large work with chamber orchestra. The season for this ensemble runs from August through May and includes four main concerts in addition to run-out performances and other scheduled events. The Opus One Women's Choir is an all female ensemble of about 15-20 singers that runs from June to August. Since 2012, Opus One has performed several large works with orchestra including Schütz's Musikalische Exequien, Vivaldi's Magnificat, Bach's Ihr Tore zu Zion, Handel's Messiah, Haydn's Missa in angustiis, Schubert's Mass in G, Mendelssohn's Te Deum, Vaughan Williams' Magnificat, and Karl Jenkins' The Armed Man: A Mass for Peace. In May 2015, Opus One performed the world premiere of Philadelphia-based composer Heidi Jacobs' Sanctus from her Mass for a Time of War.

Opus One: Berks Chamber Choir is currently under the direction of Christopher Hoster.
