= Stan Wentzel =

American baseball player

- Center fielder
- Born: January 13, 1917; Lorane, Pennsylvania, U.S.
- Died: November 28, 1991 (aged 74); St. Lawrence, Pennsylvania, U.S.
- Batted: Right Threw: Right

MLB debut
- September 23, 1945, for the Boston Braves

Last MLB appearance
- September 30, 1945, for the Boston Braves

MLB statistics
- Batting average: .211
- Home runs: 0
- Runs batted in: 6
- Stats at Baseball Reference

Teams
- Boston Braves (1945)

Stanley Aaron Wentzel (January 13, 1917 – November 28, 1991) was an American professional baseball player. A longtime minor league outfielder and, later, a manager, Wentzel's only stint in Major League Baseball came at the end of the 1945 season, when he appeared in four games in center field for the Boston Braves. The 28-year-old rookie was a native of Lorane, Pennsylvania. He threw and batted right-handed, stood 6 feet 1 inch (1.85 m) tall and weighed 200 pounds (91 kg).

Wentzel is one of many ball players who only appeared in the Major Leagues during the World War II period. After batting .321 with the Indianapolis Indians of the top-level American Association — where he was named an All-Star and the league's Most Valuable Player — he was called up by Boston and started four games for the Braves in the last week of the season, all against the New York Giants. He got only four hits in 19 at bats (.211), but had six runs batted in. He also scored three runs. In the field, Wentzel recorded eight putouts with no errors.

Wentzel returned to Indianapolis for 1946 and after that season, on September 30, he was included in a multiplayer trade that sent him to the Pittsburgh Pirates with future Hall of Fame second baseman Billy Herman, pitcher Elmer Singleton and infielder Whitey Wietelmann for third baseman Bob Elliott and catcher Hank Camelli. Herman was promptly named playing manager of the 1947 Pirates, but he was aghast at the cost — Elliott — the Pirates had paid for him. "Why, they've gone and traded the whole team on me", he said. Elliott would win the 1947 National League Most Valuable Player award and lead Boston to the 1948 National League pennant. Herman's 1947 Pirates lost 92 games and finished tied for seventh in the NL, and he resigned before the season's final game.

Wentzel never appeared in a game for the Pirates, but he played and managed in the Pittsburgh farm system through 1958. He died at the age of 74 in St. Lawrence, Pennsylvania.
