= Lower Alsace Township, Pennsylvania =

Township in Pennsylvania, US

Lower Alsace Township
- Township
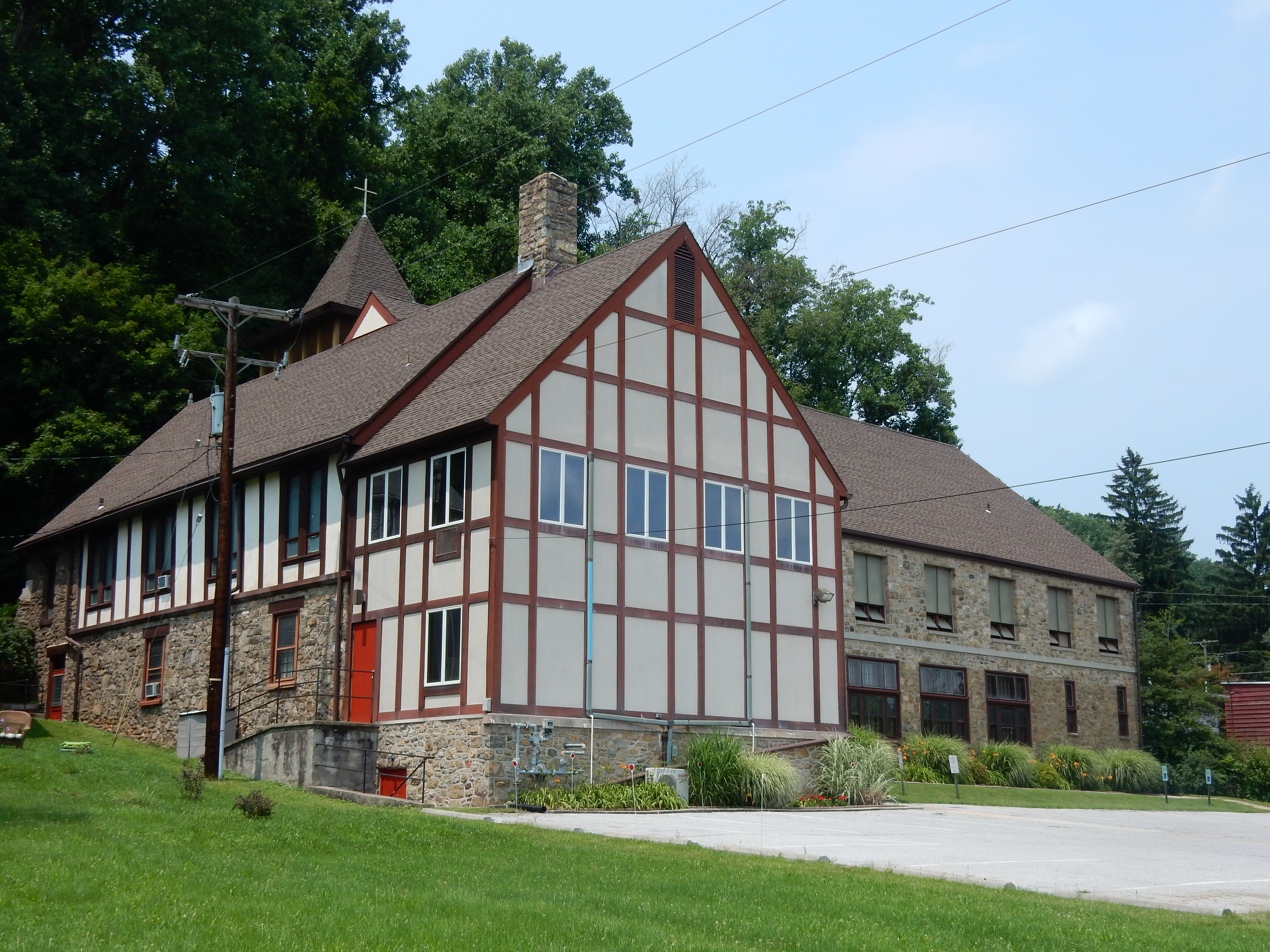
- Bethany Evangelical Lutheran Church (1914). Stony Creek Mills. July 2015.

- Location of Lower Alsace Township in Pennsylvania Lower Alsace Township (the United States)
- Coordinates: 40°21′30″N 75°52′09″W
- Country: United States
- State: Pennsylvania
- County: Berks

Area
  - Total: 4.79 sq mi (12.41 km^{2})
  - Land: 4.75 sq mi (12.30 km^{2})
  - Water: 0.039 sq mi (0.10 km^{2})
- Elevation: 597 ft (182 m)

Population (2020)
  - Total: 4,743
  - Estimate (2023): 4,836
  - Density: 939.2/sq mi (362.62/km^{2})
- Time zone: UTC-5 (EST)
  - Summer (DST): UTC-4 (EDT)
- Area code: 610
- FIPS code: 42-011-44840
- Website: https://latownship.org/

Lower Alsace Township is a township in Berks County, Pennsylvania, United States. The population was 4,716 at the 2020 census. By area, it is the smallest township in Berks County.

== Geography ==
According to the U.S. Census Bureau, the township has a total area of 4.79 square miles (12.41 km^{2}), of which 4.75 square miles (12.30 km^{2}) is land and 0.04 square miles is water (0.10 km^{2}).

Adjacent townships

- Alsace Township (north)
- Exeter Township (east)
- Cumru Township (south)

Adjacent cities and boroughs

- Reading (west)
- Mt. Penn (middle)

Census-designated places within the township

- Stony Creek Mills (CDP boundaries also include portions of adjacent Exeter Township)
- Pennside (CDP boundaries also include portions of adjacent Exeter Township)

== Demographics ==
Historical population
Census	Pop.	Note	%±
1980	4,906		—
1990	4,627		−5.7%
2000	4,478		−3.2%
2010	4,475		−0.1%
2020	4,716		5.4%
2023 (est.)	4,836		2.5%
Source: US Census Bureau

As of the 2020 census, of there were 4,716 people and 1,849 households. The population density was 985 inhabitants per square mile (380/km^{2}). There were 2,055 housing units at an average density of 419 per square mile (162/km^{2}). The racial makeup of the township was 80.28% White, 2.28% African American, 0.25% Asian, 3.94% from other races, and 13.25% from two or more races. Hispanic or Latino of any race were 20.12% of the population.

There were 1,849 households, out of which 22.6% had children under the age of 18 living with them, 50.2% were married couples living together, 17.5% had a female householder with no husband present while 23.5% had a male householder with no wife present, and 8.8% were non-families. The average family size was 3.24.

In the township, the population was spread out, with 25.4% being 18 or under, 3.67% from 19 to 24, 26.4% from 25 to 44, 27.0% from 45 to 64, and 17.53% who were 65 years of age or older. The median age was 40 years.

The median income for a household in the township was $68,789, and the median income for a family was $84,211. Males had a median income of $37,253 versus $25,891 for females.

== Transportation ==
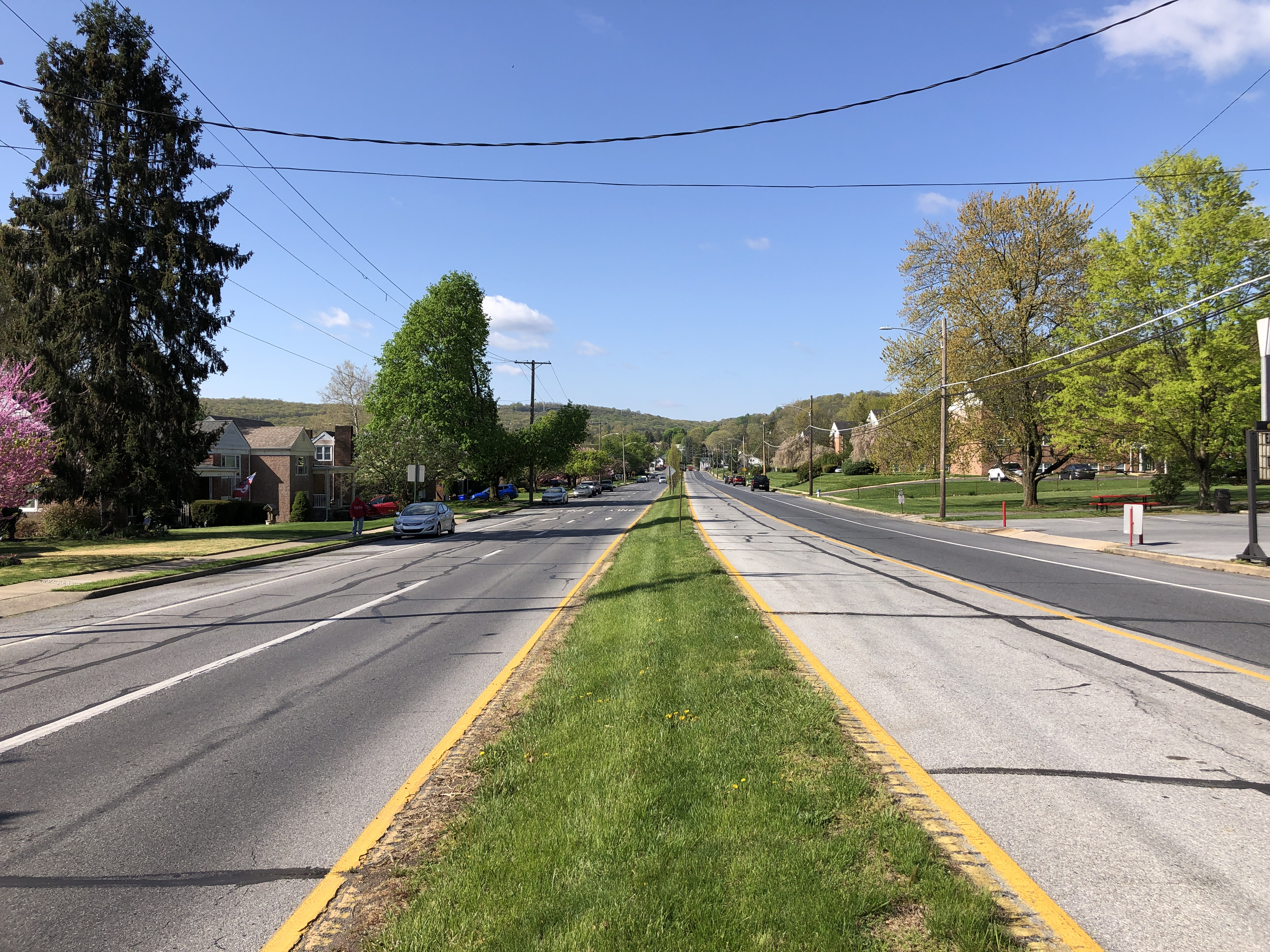
Carsonia Avenue in Lower Alsace Township

As of 2016, there were 29.19 miles (46.98 km) of public roads in Lower Alsace Township, of which 5.51 miles (8.87 km) were maintained by the Pennsylvania Department of Transportation (PennDOT) and 23.68 miles (38.11 km) were maintained by the township.

No numbered highways pass through Lower Alsace Township. Main thoroughfares in the township include Carsonia Avenue, Friedensburg Road and Antietam Road.

== Gallery ==
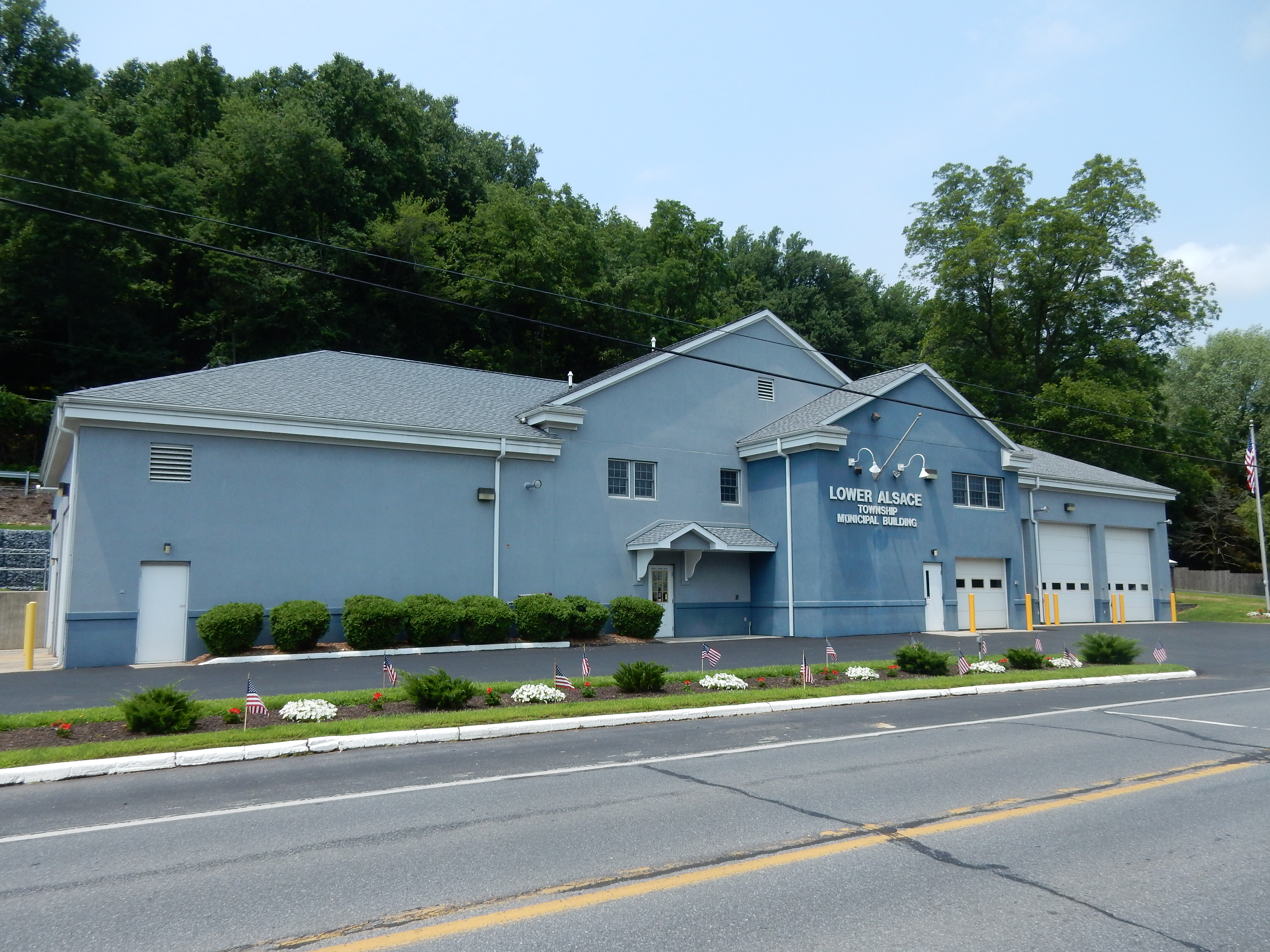
Township Municipal Bldg.

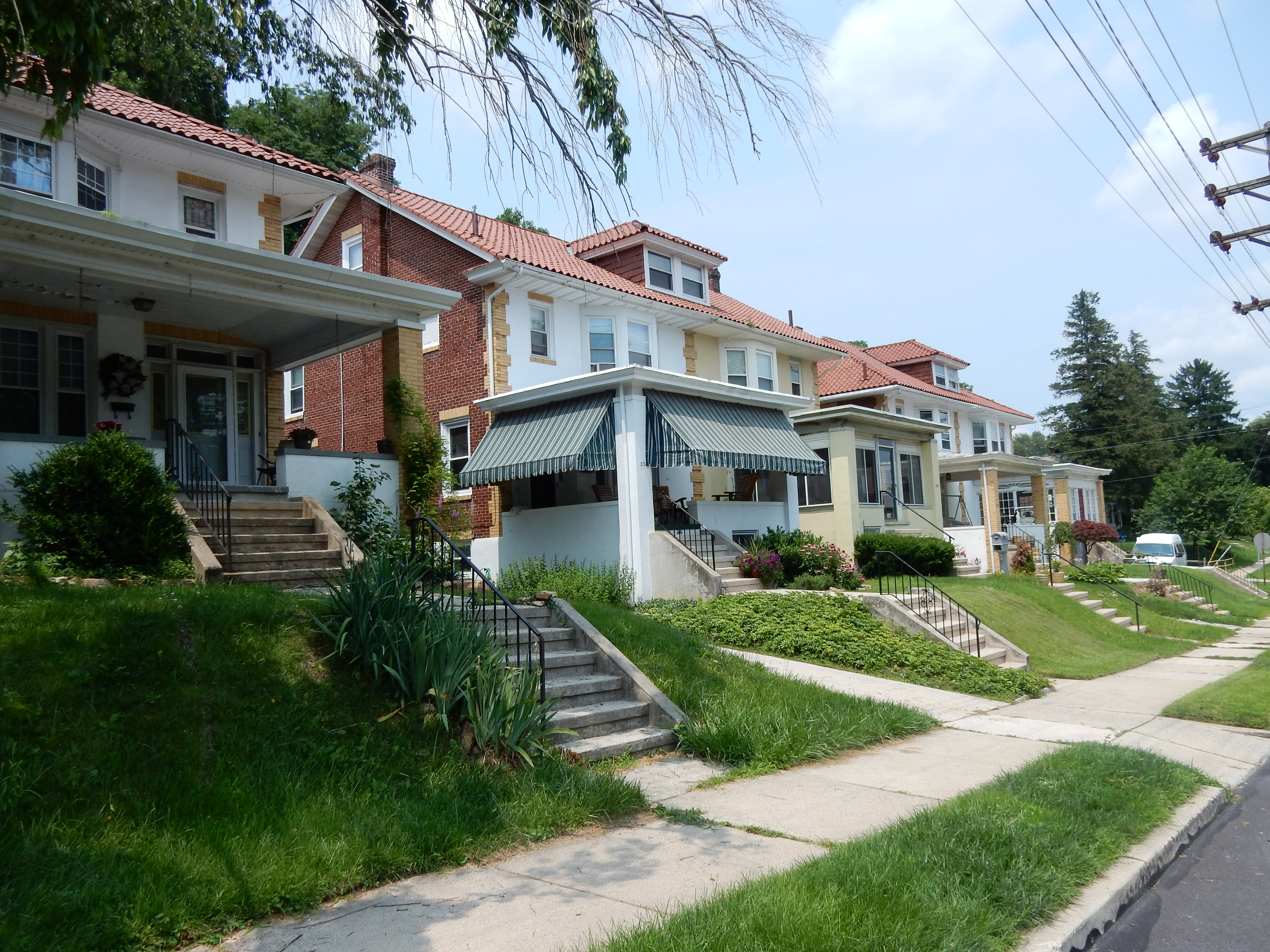
Carsonia Ave. at Stony Creek Mills.

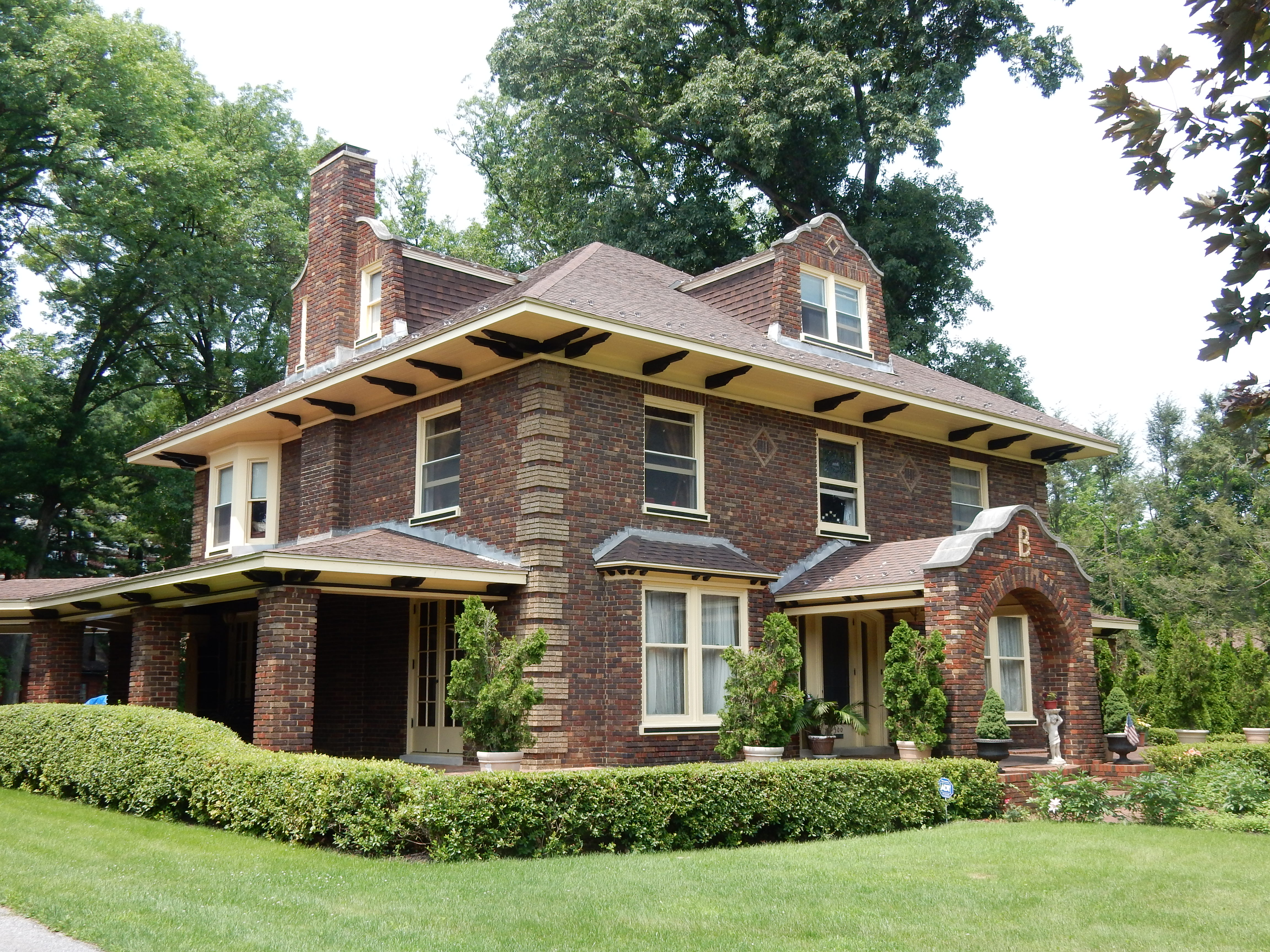
Carsonia Ave. at Stony Creek Mills.

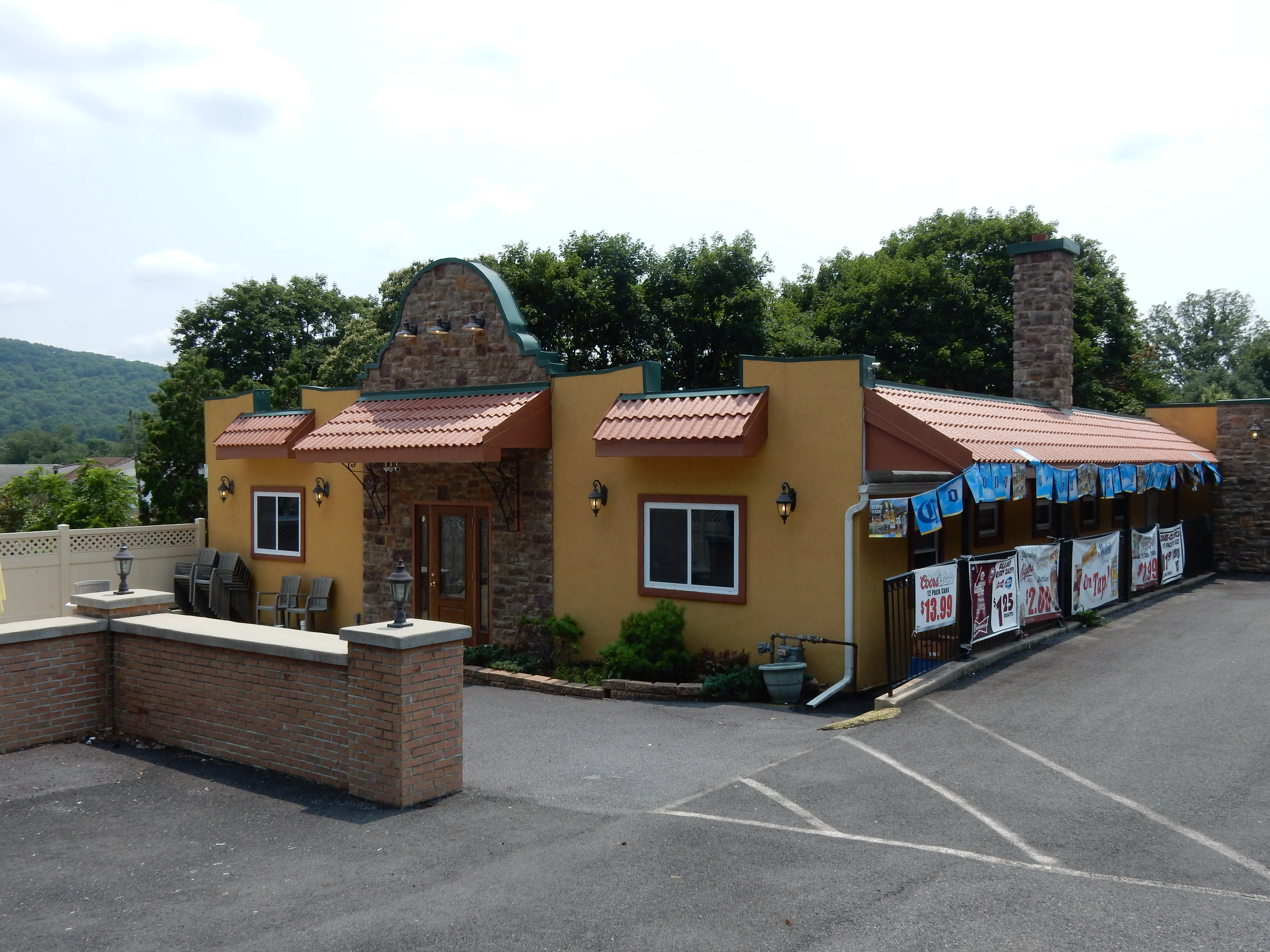
Fiesta Mexicana.

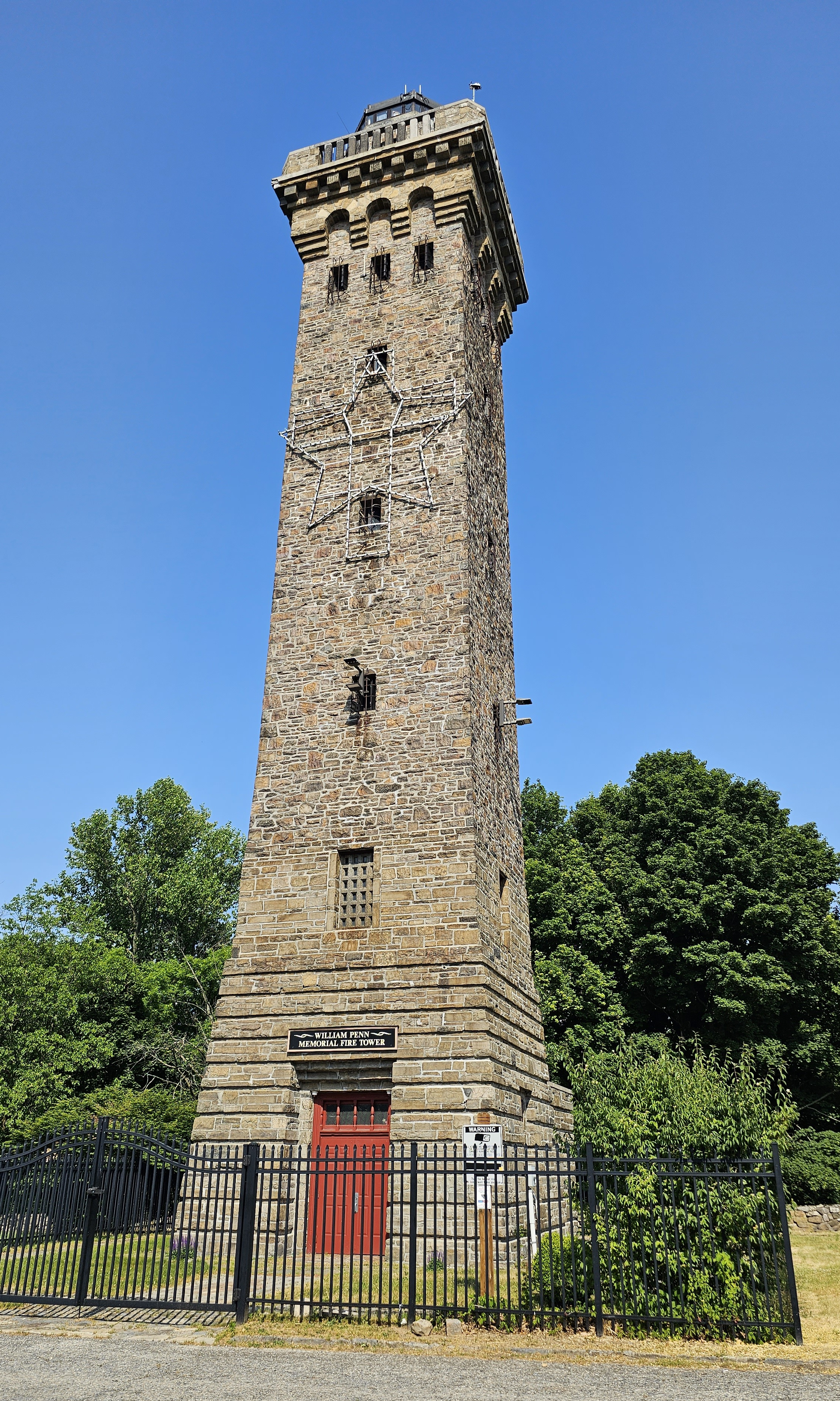
William Penn Memorial Fire Tower
