= John Bishop House =

Historic house in Pennsylvania, United States

- U.S. National Register of Historic Places
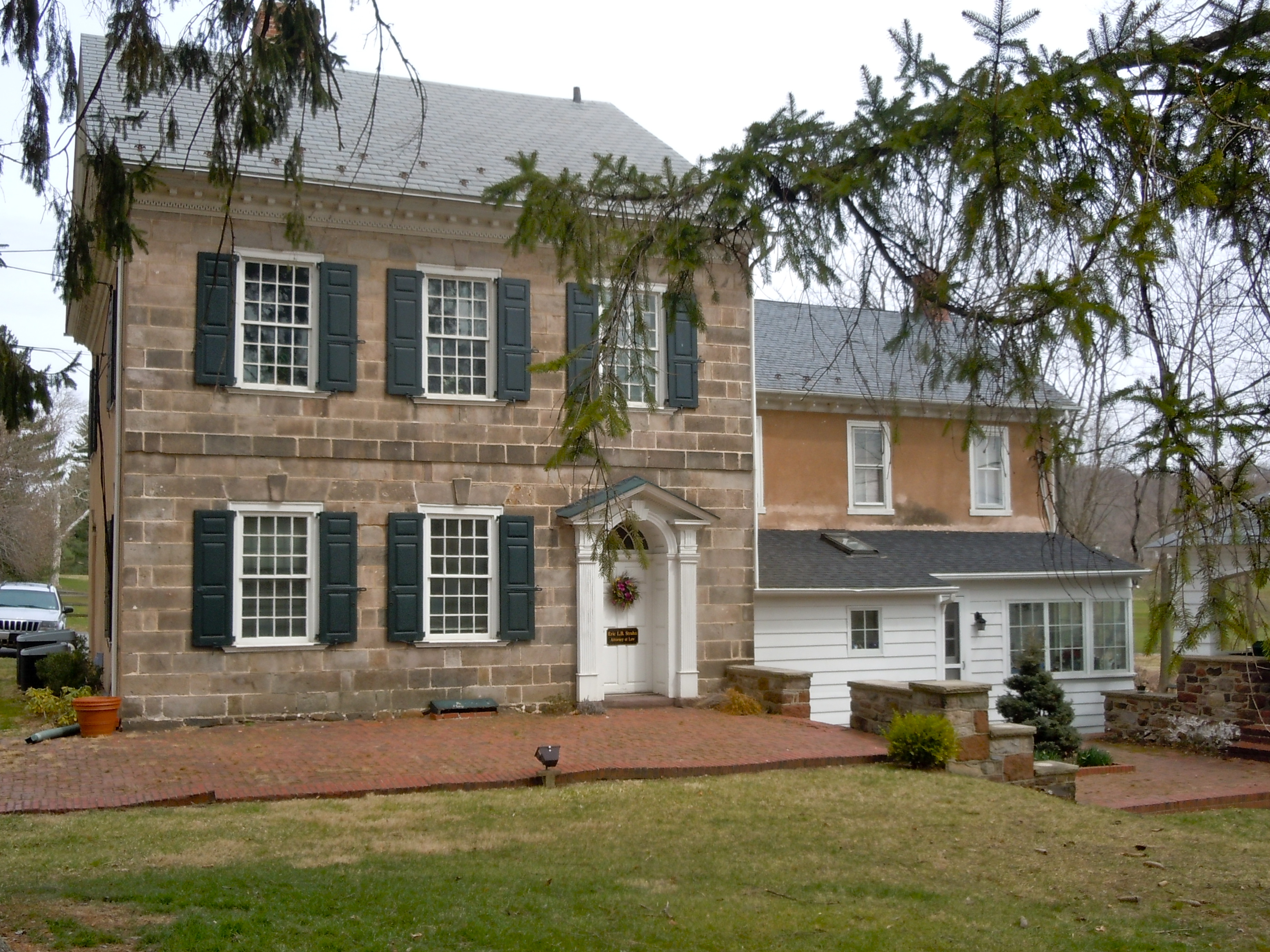
- John Bishop House, March 2011

- Location within Pennsylvania Location within the United States
- Location: Perkiomen Avenue east of Reading, Exeter Township, Pennsylvania
- Coordinates: 40°18′2″N 75°50′56″W
- Area: 1 acre (0.40 ha)
- Built: c. 1770
- Architectural style: Colonial Revival, Other, Palladian Colonial Revival
- NRHP reference No.: 85001390
- Added to NRHP: June 27, 1985

John Bishop House is a historic home located in Exeter Township, Berks County, Pennsylvania. It is a colonial Georgian dwelling in the Palladian style. It was built about 1770, and is a 2 1/2-story stone dwelling with a gable roof and two-story addition. It features a cut stone facade, Georgian entryway, and open staircase rising three stories.

It was listed on the National Register of Historic Places in 1985.
