= Stony Creek Mills, Pennsylvania =

Unincorporated community in Pennsylvania, US

- Census-designated place
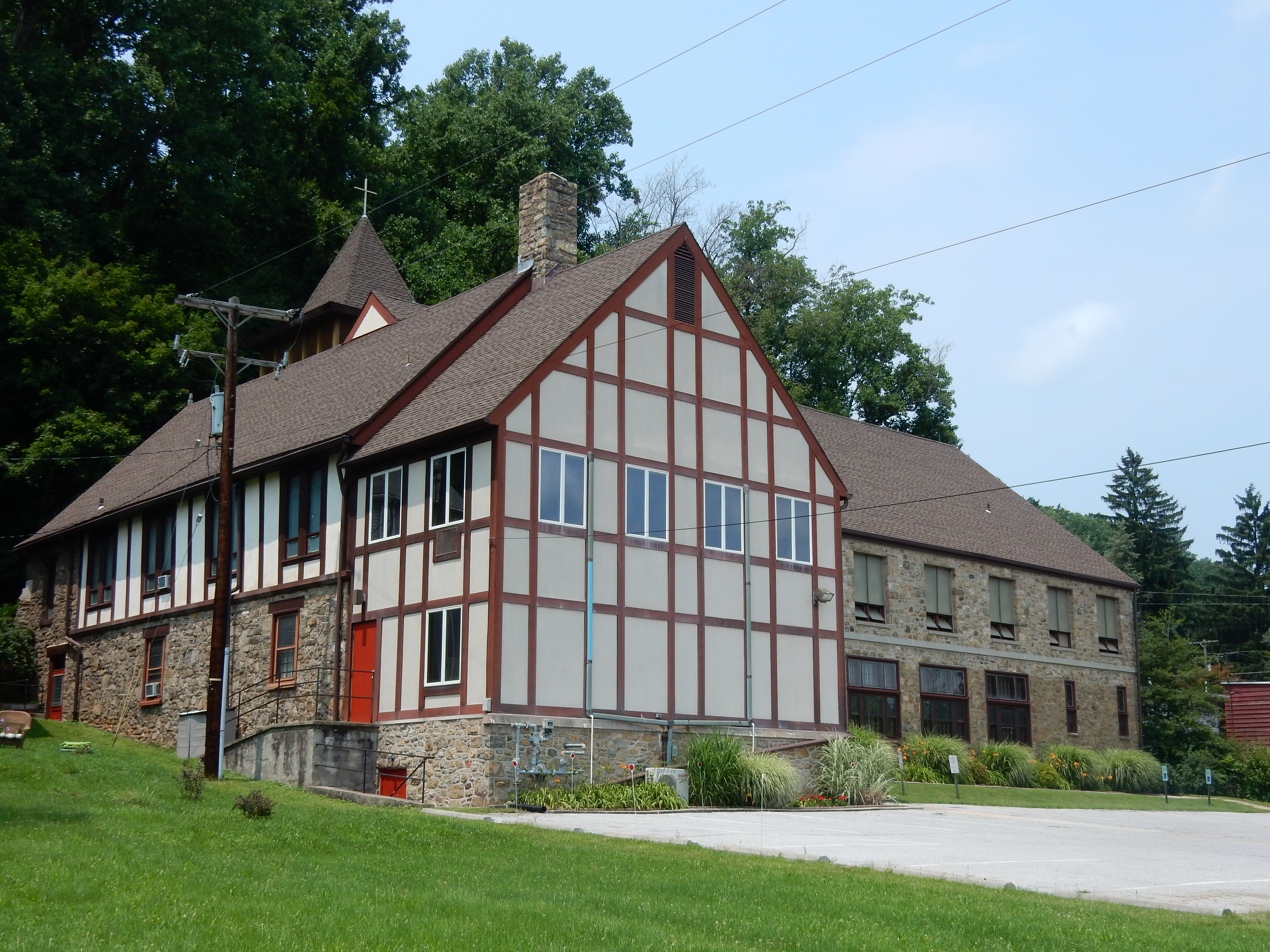
- Bethany Evangelical Lutheran Church in Stony Creek Mills

- Location within Pennsylvania Location within the United States
- Coordinates: 40°20′58″N 75°51′52″W
- Country: United States
- State: Pennsylvania
- County: Berks
- Townships: Lower Alsace, Exeter
- Elevation: 410 ft (120 m)

Population (2010)
  - Total: 1,045
- Time zone: UTC-5 (Eastern (EST))
  - Summer (DST): UTC-4 (EDT)
- ZIP code: 19606
- Area codes: 484, 610 and 835
- GNIS feature ID: 2631308

Stony Creek Mills is a census-designated place in Lower Alsace and Exeter Townships in Berks County, Pennsylvania. It is located approximately five miles east of the city of Reading. As of the 2010 census, the population was 1,045 residents.

== Notable person ==
- Carl Furillo, professional baseball outfielder for the Brooklyn/Los Angeles Dodgers
