= Boonecroft =

Historic house in Pennsylvania, United States

- U.S. National Register of Historic Places
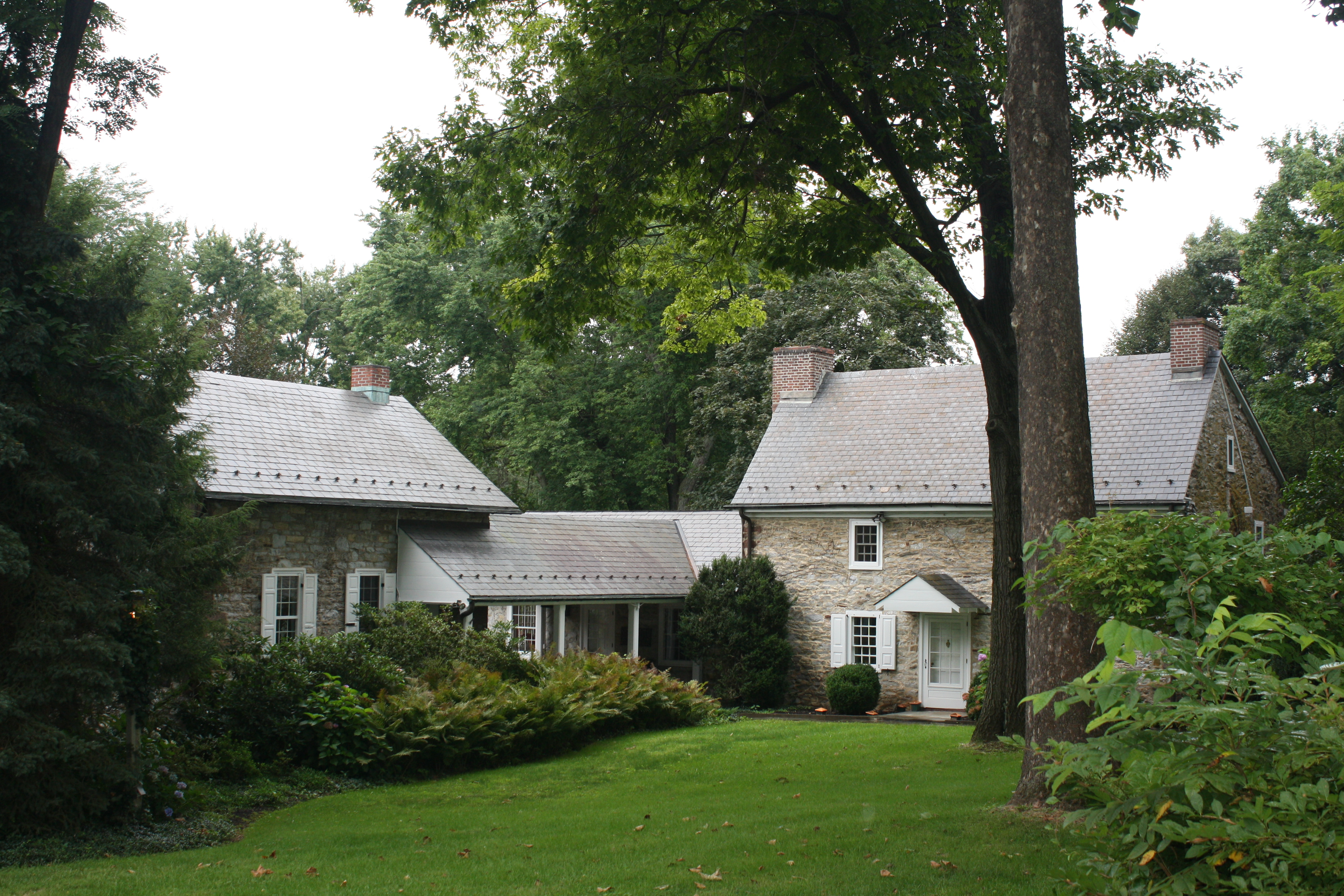
- Boonecroft. August 2013.

- Location within Pennsylvania Location within the United States
- Location: Oley Line Road near Limekiln, Exeter Township, Pennsylvania
- Coordinates: 40°19′56″N 75°48′10″W
- Area: 25 acres (10 ha)
- Built: 1720, 1733
- Built by: Boone, George III
- Architectural style: Colonial
- NRHP reference No.: 82003758
- Added to NRHP: July 26, 1982

Boonecroft is an historic homestead which is located in Exeter Township, Berks County, Pennsylvania.

It was added to the National Register of Historic Places in 1982.

== History and architectural features ==
This historic property includes the remains of the log cabin that was built in 1720 by Quaker settler George Boone III. These remains consist of a chimney and fireplace, and are marked by a stone marker that was erected in 1925, the year after log cabin burned down.

The adjacent stone farmhouse was built in 1733, and is a two-and-one-half-story Colonial English-style structure that is built from fieldstone with sandstone quoins. It has a slate-covered gable roof, and also has a one-story stone addition.

Also located on the property are the contributing guesthouse/spring house, smokehouse, and barn. The property is considered the ancestral home of the Boone family in America, which includes frontiersman Daniel Boone, grandson of George Boone III. Daniel Boone was born at the nearby Daniel Boone Homestead.

It was added to the National Register of Historic Places in 1982.
