= Mill Tract Farm =

- U.S. National Register of Historic Places
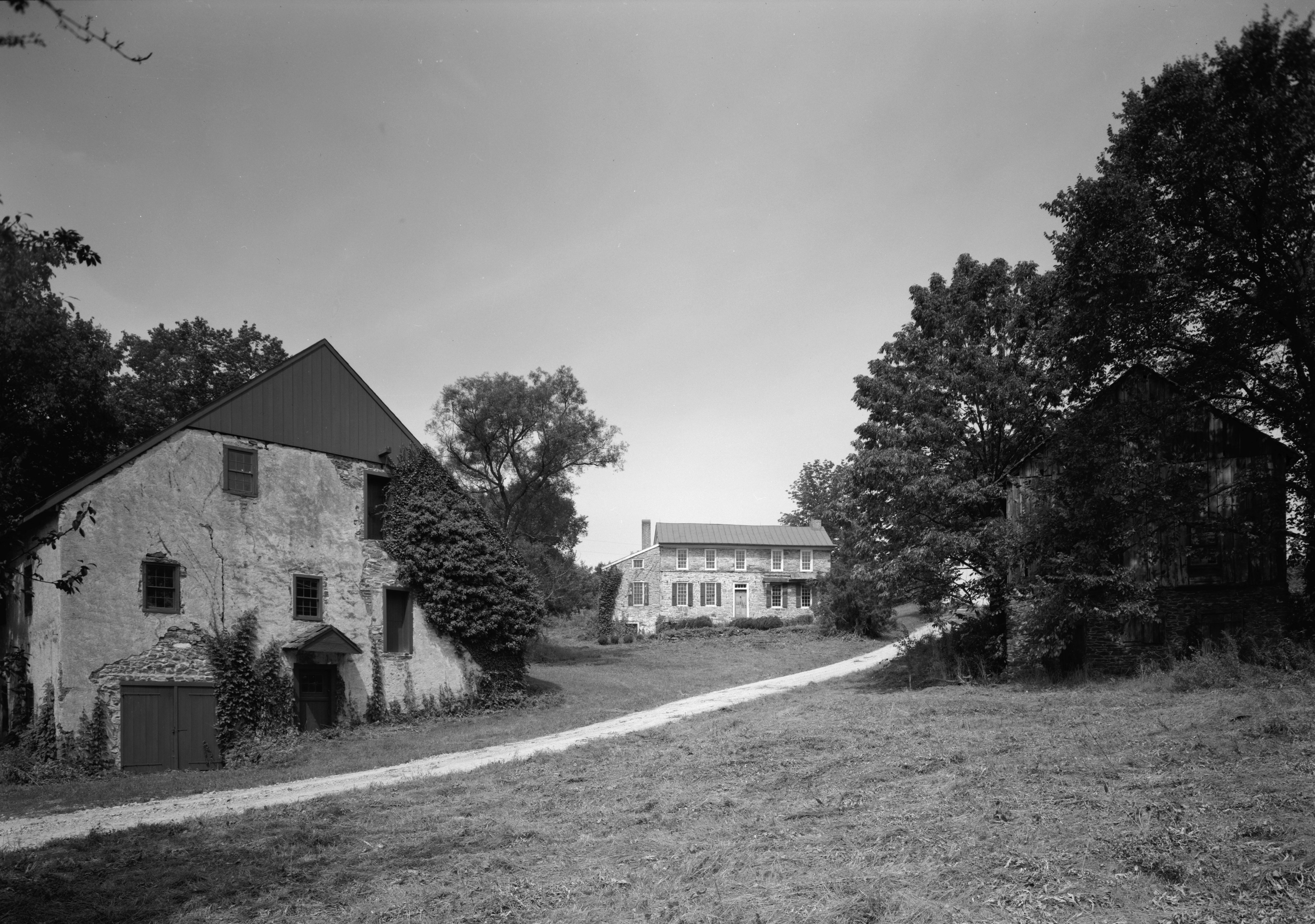
- Mill Tract Farm, September 1958 (HABS Photo)

- Location within Pennsylvania Location within the United States
- Location: Northeast of Stonersville on Mill Road, Exeter Township, Pennsylvania
- Coordinates: 40°19′30″N 75°47′26″W
- Area: 127 acres (51 ha)
- Built: c. 1728, c. 1750, 1790-1820
- Built by: Boone, George
- Architectural style: Georgian
- NRHP reference No.: 77001124
- Added to NRHP: September 22, 1977

The Mill Tract Farm, also known as the George Boone Homestead, is an historic house and farm complex in Exeter Township, Berks County, Pennsylvania, United States.

It was listed on the National Register of Historic Places in 1978.

== History and architectural features ==
The original section of this historic house was built circa 1750, with a western addition built circa 1790 and rear additions completed between 1790 and 1820. It is a two-story, five-bay, L-shaped, fieldstone dwelling that was designed in the Georgian style. Also located on the property are a 2 1/2-story, stone grist mill (c. 1728), an early-nineteenth-century, 2 1/2-story, fieldstone, tenant house, a large, late-eighteenth-century stone-and-frame barn, a stone pig pen, and a two-story, stone horse barn. The grist mill was purportedly built by George Boone III, the grandfather of frontiersman Daniel Boone, who received the original land grant.

It was listed on the National Register of Historic Places in 1978.
