= Levan Farm =

- U.S. National Register of Historic Places
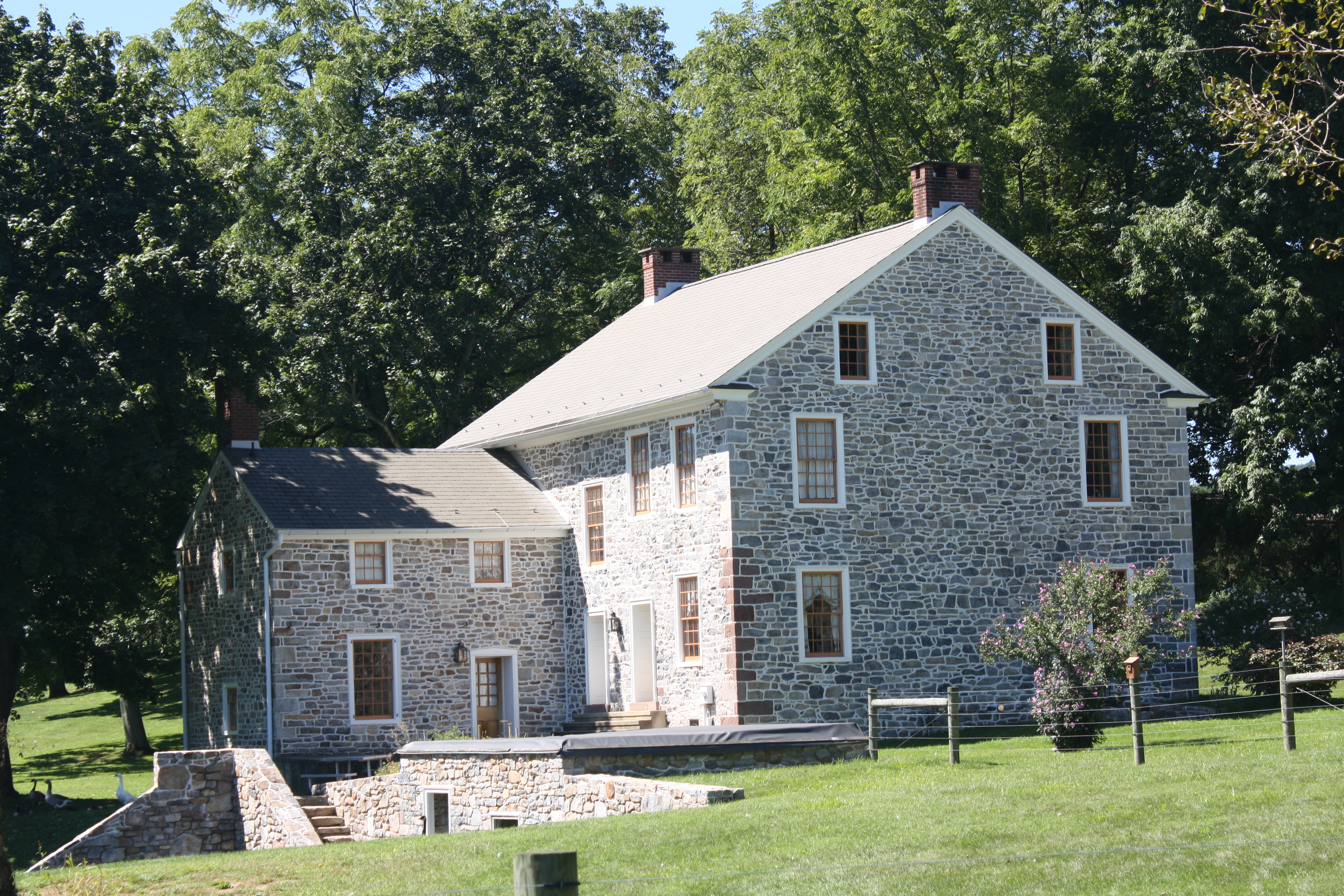
- Levan Farmhouse. September 2013.

- Location within Pennsylvania Location within the United States
- Location: PA 562, Exeter Township, Pennsylvania
- Coordinates: 40°19′12.1″N 75°51′34.4″W
- Area: 54 acres (22 ha)
- Built: 1730
- Architectural style: Georgian
- NRHP reference No.: 78002348
- Added to NRHP: December 19, 1978

The Levan Farm, also known as the Issac Levan Tract and Jacob Levan Farm, is an historic house and farm complex in Exeter Township, Berks County, Pennsylvania, United States.

It was listed on the National Register of Historic Places in 1978.

== History and architectural features ==
This historic house was built in 1837, and is a two-story, five-bay by two-bay, stone dwelling that was designed in the Georgian style. It was built using fieldstone with light colored and red sandstone quoins. It has a later, 1 1/2-story rear addition. Also located on the property are a stone and wood frame bank barn, spring house, lime kilns, granary, corn crib, and wagon shed. The Levan Farm was established by Isaac Levan circa 1730 with a land grant from William Penn.

It was listed on the National Register of Historic Places in 1978.

== Gallery ==
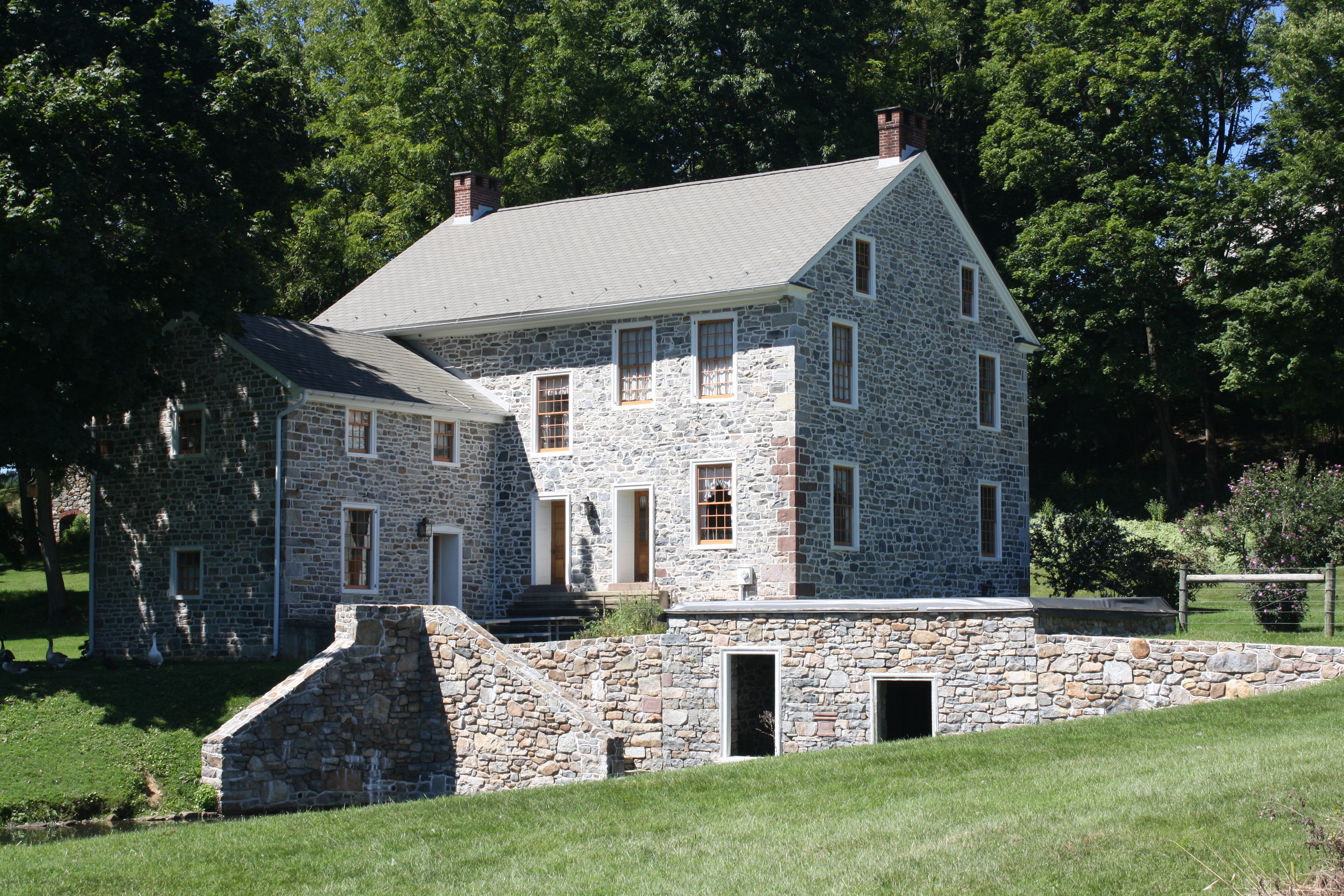
Farmhouse

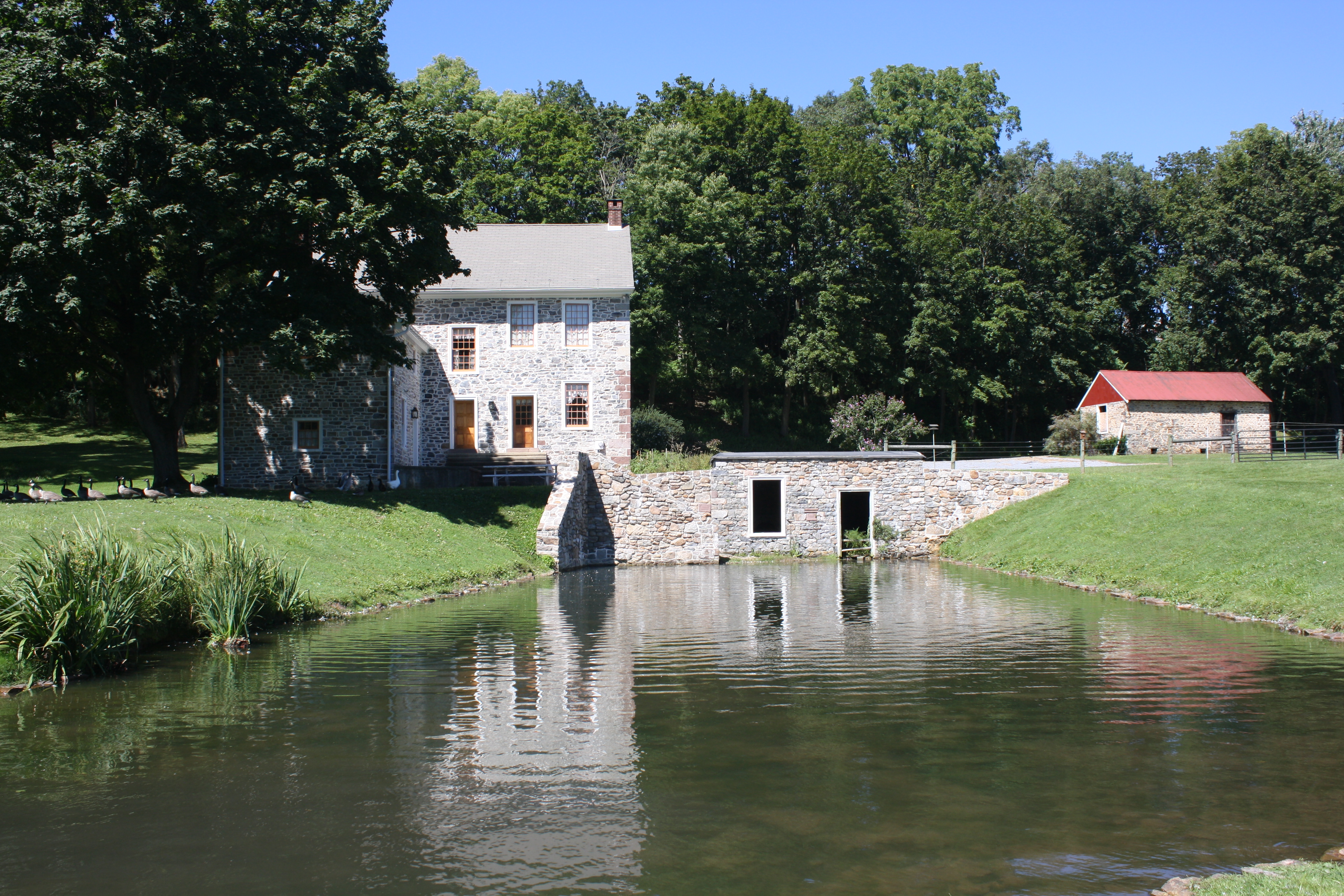
Farmhouse and pond

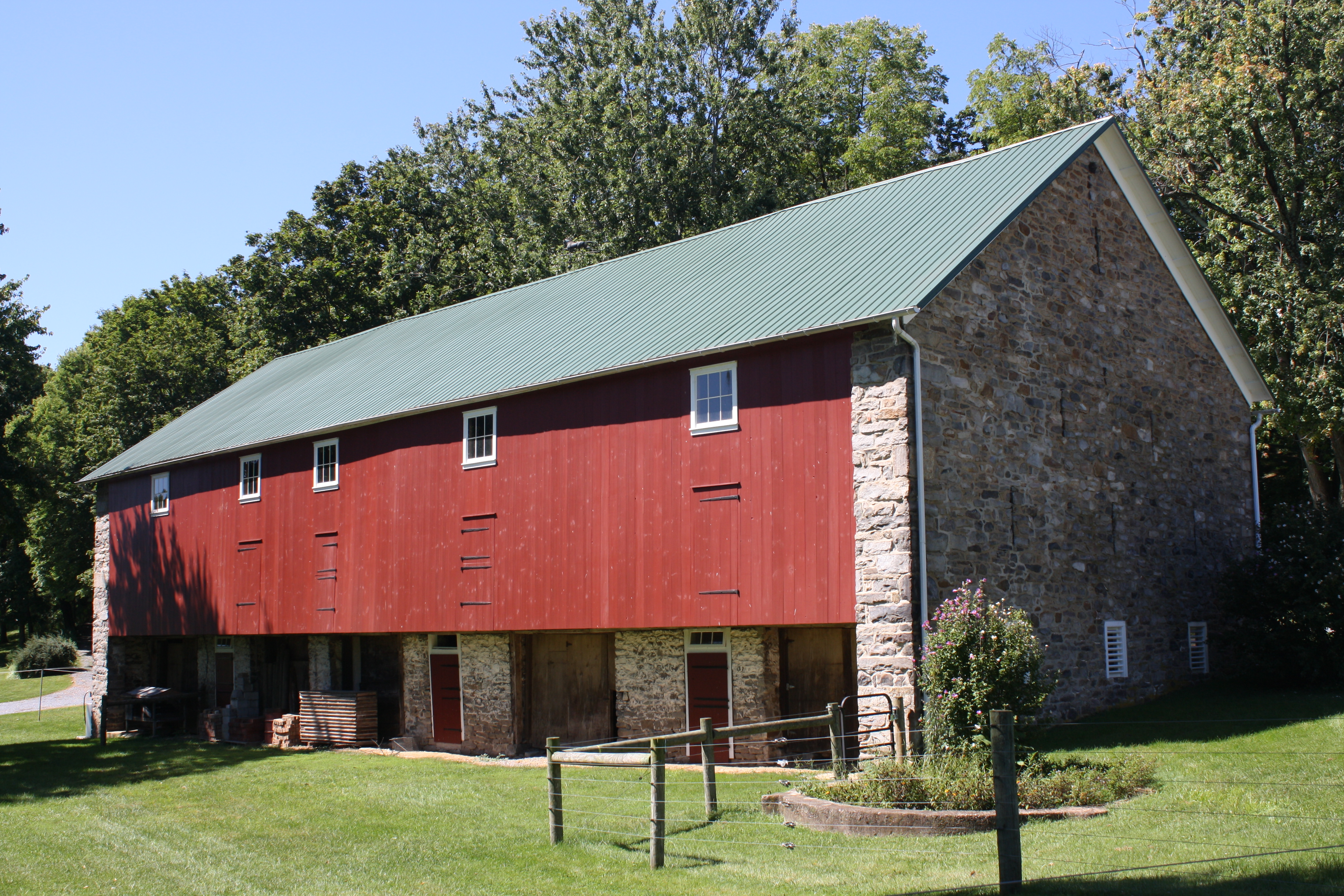
Barn

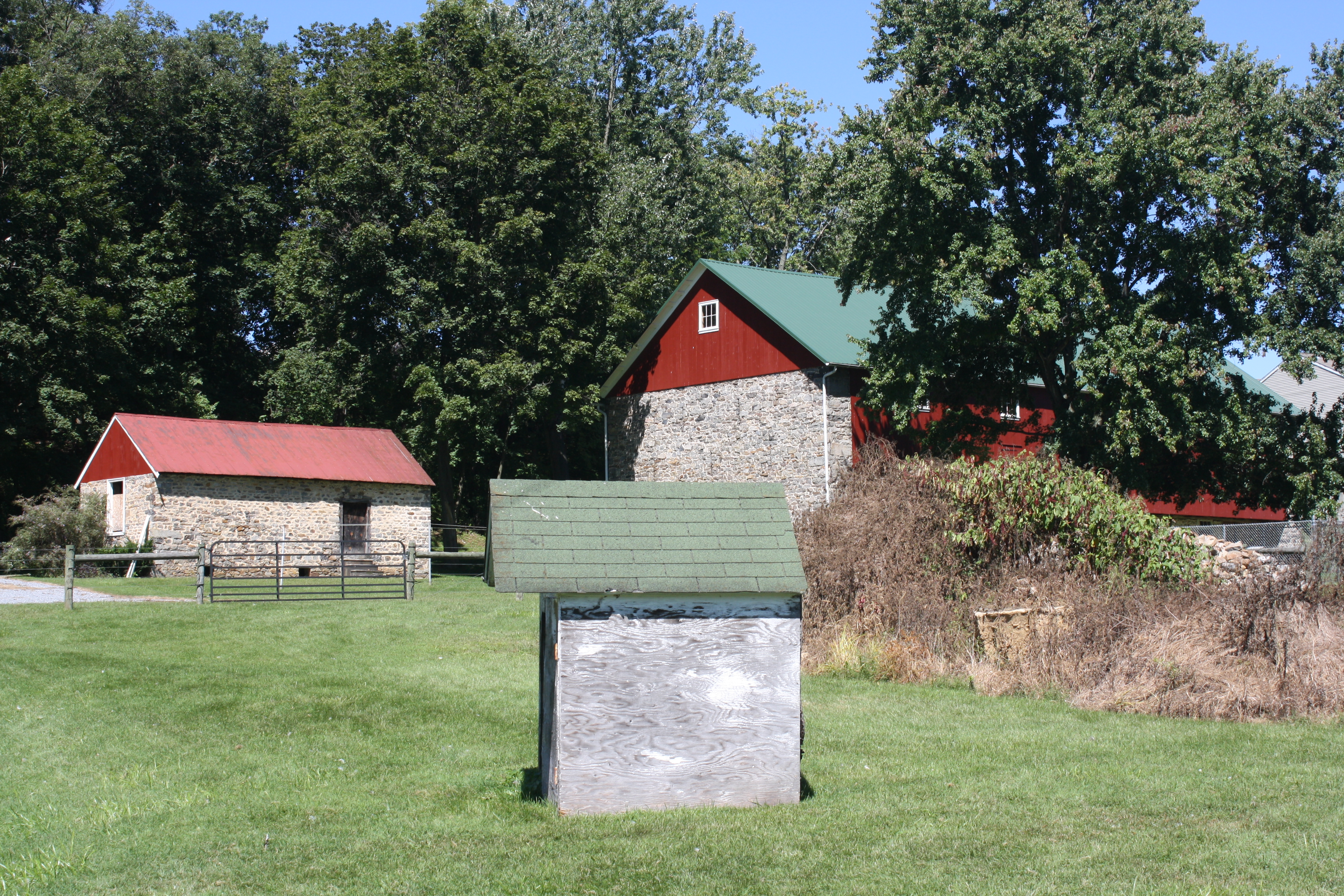
Wagon shed and Barn

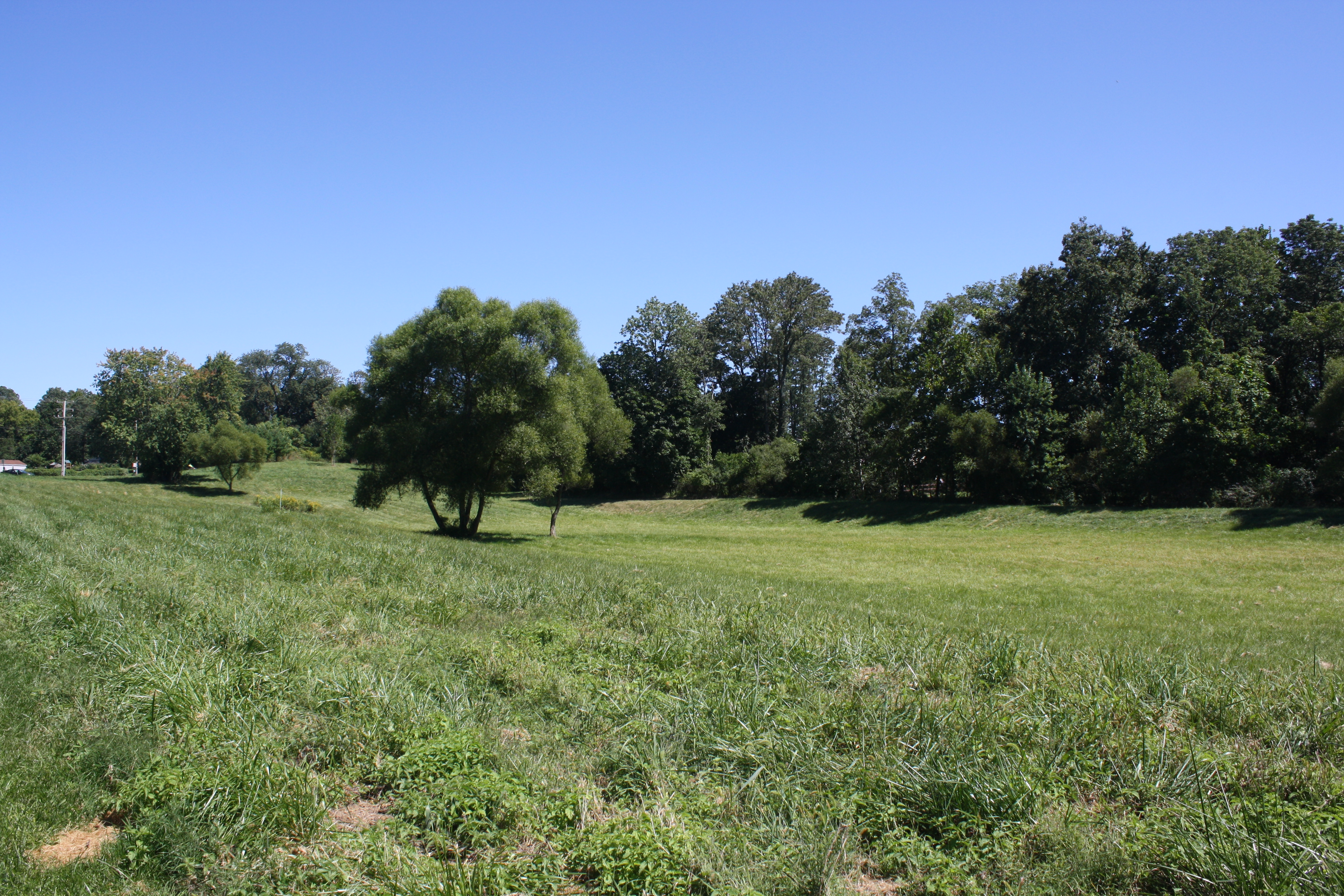
Meadow
