= Pennside, Pennsylvania =

Unincorporated community in Pennsylvania, US

- Census-designated place
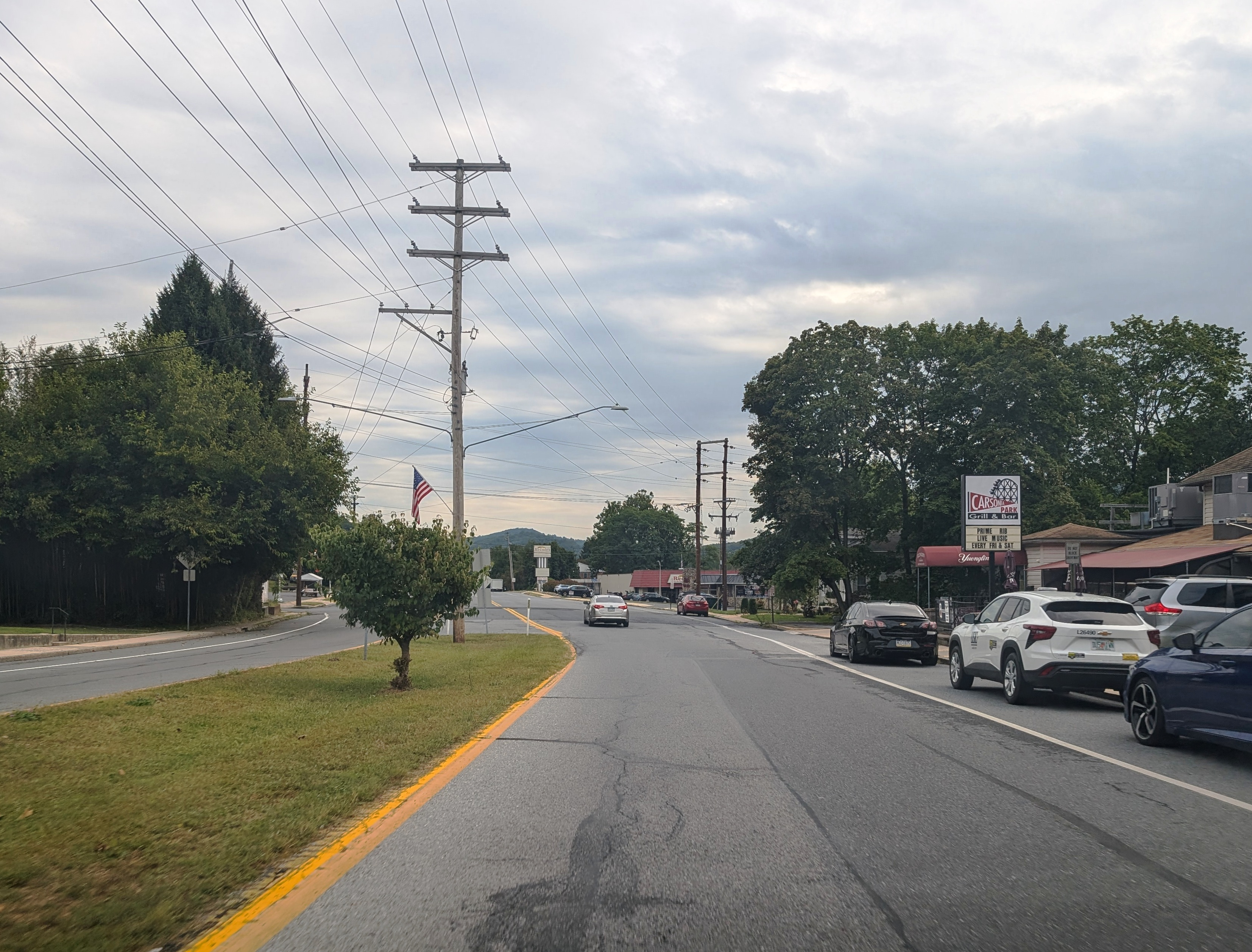
- Carsonia Avenue northbound through Pennside

- Location within Pennsylvania Location within the United States
- Coordinates: 40°20′14″N 75°52′43″W
- Country: United States
- State: Pennsylvania
- County: Berks
- Townships: Lower Alsace, Exeter

Area
  - Total: 1.02 sq mi (2.65 km^{2})
  - Land: 1.02 sq mi (2.63 km^{2})
  - Water: 0.012 sq mi (0.03 km^{2})

Population (2020)
  - Total: 5,190
  - Density: 5,117.5/sq mi (1,975.89/km^{2})
- Time zone: UTC-5 (Eastern (EST))
  - Summer (DST): UTC-4 (EDT)
- ZIP code: 19606
- Area codes: 484, 610 and 835
- FIPS code: 42-59176

Pennside is a census-designated place in Lower Alsace and Exeter Townships in Berks County, Pennsylvania, United States. It is located approximately four miles (6.4 km) east of the city of Reading. As of the 2010 census, the population was 4,215 residents.

== Demographics ==
Historical population
Census	Pop.	Note	%±
2020	5,190		—
U.S. Decennial Census
