= Baumstown, Pennsylvania =

Unincorporated community in Pennsylvania, US

- Census-designated place
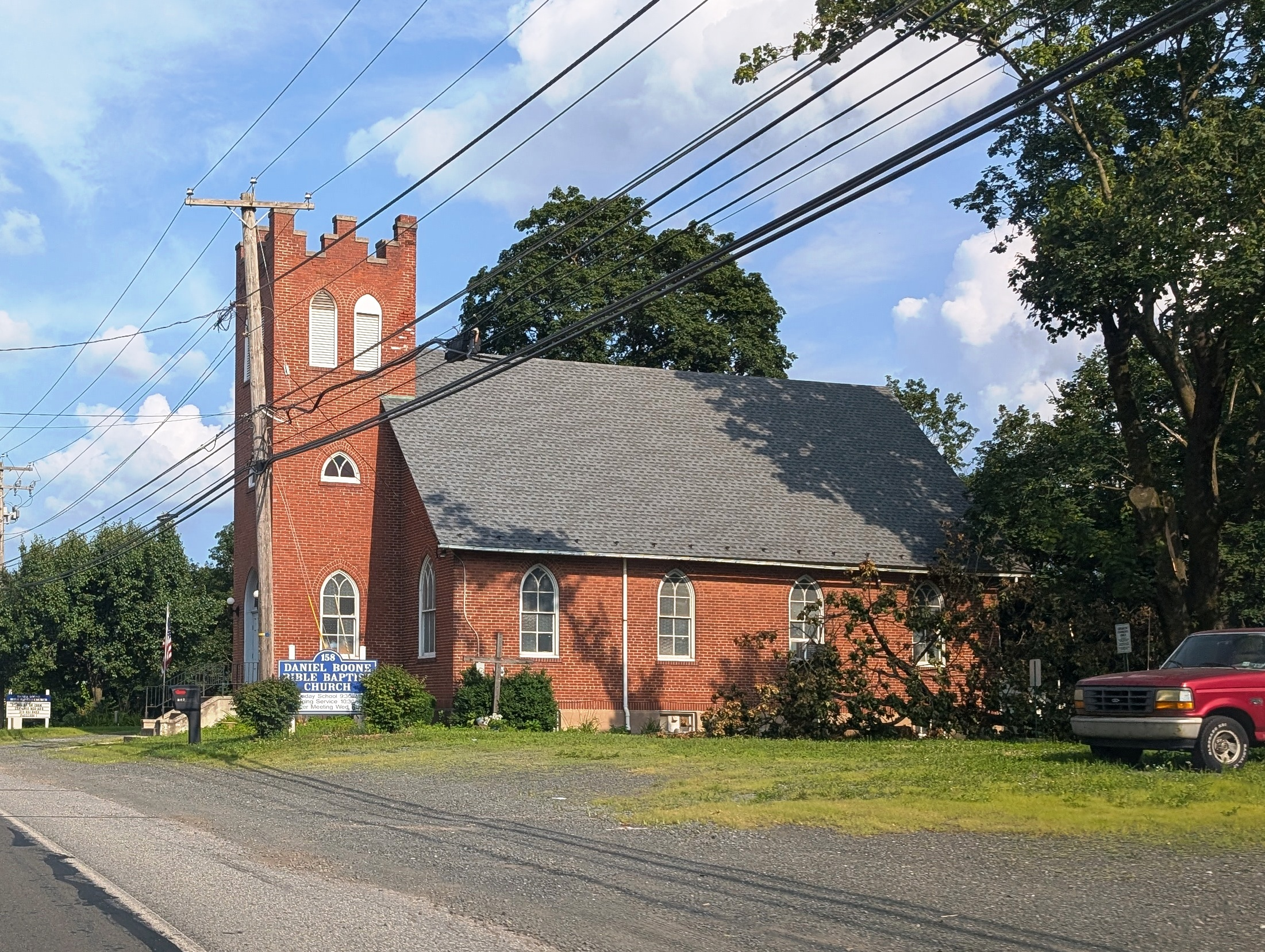
- Daniel Boone Bible Baptist Church in Baumstown

- Location within Pennsylvania Location within the United States
- Coordinates: 40°16′49″N 75°48′18″W
- Country: United States
- State: Pennsylvania
- County: Berks
- Township: Exeter

Area
  - Total: 1.00 sq mi (2.59 km^{2})
  - Land: 1.00 sq mi (2.59 km^{2})
  - Water: 0 sq mi (0.00 km^{2})
- Elevation: 289 ft (88 m)

Population (2020)
  - Total: 346
  - Density: 346.0/sq mi (133.58/km^{2})
- Time zone: UTC-5 (Eastern (EST))
  - Summer (DST): UTC-4 (EDT)
- ZIP code: 19508
- Area codes: 610 and 484
- FIPS code: 42-04488
- GNIS feature ID: 1203033

Baumstown is a census-designated place in Exeter Township, Berks County, Pennsylvania, United States, located near the borough of Birdsboro. It is located at the junction of U.S. Highway 422 and Pennsylvania Route 345. As of the 2020 census the population of Baumstown was 346 residents.

Historical population
Census	Pop.	Note	%±
2020	346		—
U.S. Decennial Census
