= Daniel Boone Homestead =

Historic house in Pennsylvania, United States

- Daniel Boone Homestead Site and Bertolet Cabin
- U.S. National Register of Historic Places
- Pennsylvania state historical marker
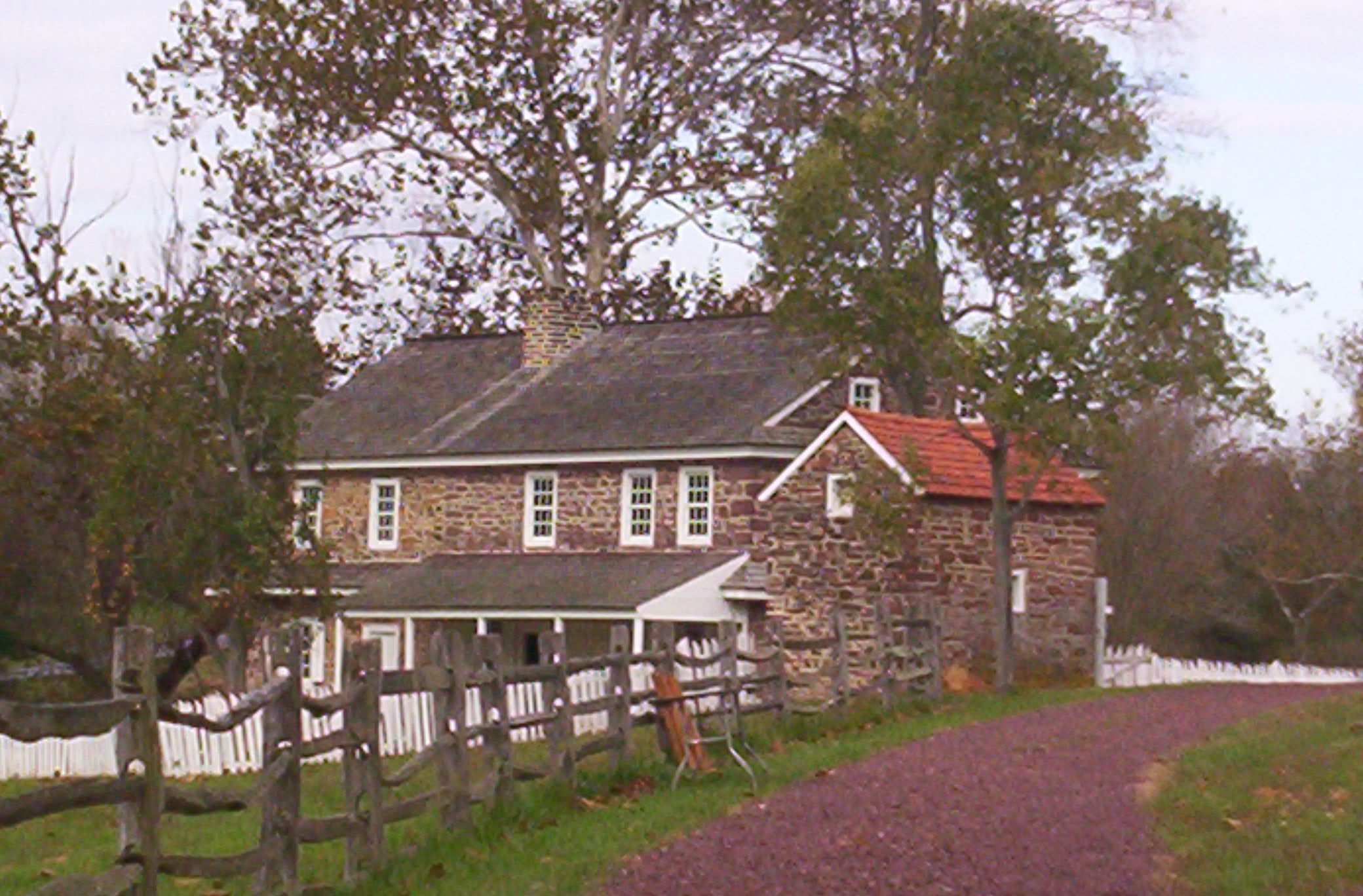
- This house stands over the site of the log cabin that Daniel Boone was born in. The basement in the house is original to the log cabin.

- Location within Pennsylvania Location within the United States
- Interactive map showing the location of Daniel Boone Homestead
- Nearest city: Birdsboro, Pennsylvania, U.S.
- Coordinates: 40°17′53″N 75°47′52″W
- Area: 577 acres (234 ha)
- Built: 1730
- NRHP reference No.: 72001090
- Added to NRHP: March 24, 1972

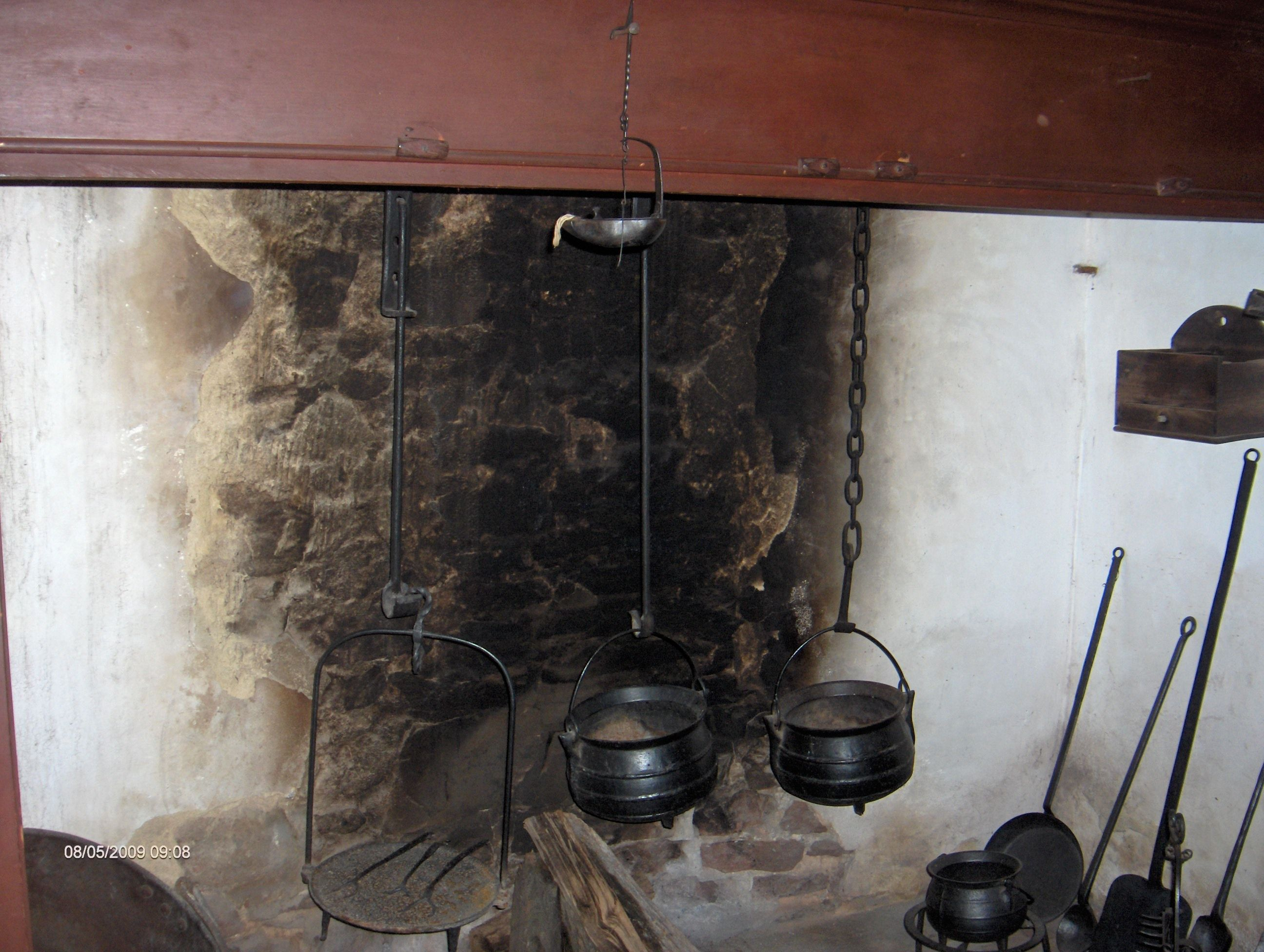
Fireplace in the Daniel Boone Homestead kitchen

The Daniel Boone Homestead, the birthplace of American frontiersman Daniel Boone, is a museum and historic house that is administered by the Friends of the Daniel Boone Homestead near Birdsboro in Berks County, Pennsylvania. It is located on nearly 600 acres (2.4 km^{2}) and is the largest site owned by the Pennsylvania Historical and Museum Commission. The staff at Daniel Boone Homestead interpret the lives of the three main families that lived at the Homestead: the Boones, the Maugridges and the DeTurks. The park is just off U.S. Route 422 north of Birdsboro in Exeter Township.

== Homestead ==
=== Squire Boone ===
In 1730, Squire Boone, Daniel Boone's father, built a log cabin in the Oley Valley in what is now Berks County near present-day Reading. Daniel Boone was born in the 1 1/2-story log house. One wall was built of native stone. The basement of the house served as a spring house. It provided easy access to water for cleaning, cooking and drinking. The springhouse also was useful for cold storage.

Squire Boone expanded his property in 1741 when he purchased 25 acres (100,000 m^{2}) of land for use as a pasture for his dairy cattle. Squire Boone was a blacksmith and weaver. The responsibility for tending the cattle was given to Daniel. During the summer months he stayed in a rustic cabin at the edge of the pasture. From there he was able to protect the cattle from predators such as the black bear, bobcat, and mountain lions.

The Boone family became a source of controversy in the local Quaker community. In 1742, Boone's parents were compelled to publicly apologize after their eldest child Sarah married a non-Quaker. When Boone's oldest brother Israel also married a non-Quaker in 1747, Squire Boone stood by his son and was therefore expelled from the Quakers, although his wife continued to attend monthly meetings with her children. Perhaps as a result of this controversy, in 1750 Squire sold his land and moved the family south. The Boones eventually settled on the Yadkin River, in what is now Davie County, North Carolina, about two miles (3 km) west of Mocksville.

=== Maugridge and DeTurk ===
Ownership of the Daniel Boone Homestead was transferred in 1750 to William Maugridge, a relative of the Boones from Philadelphia and an associate of Benjamin Franklin. He was a shipwright and carpenter. The home underwent an expansion either just before or just after the time that it was transferred to Maugridge. This addition created a two-story house. The house featured a typical hall and parlor as well as a "bible closet".

Maugridge died in 1766 and the property was then purchased by John DeTurk. DeTurk remodeled the house completely. He removed the walls of the log cabin and had them rebuilt with stone. DeTurk may have also built the smokehouse that can be seen today at the park. Several other farmers owned the land in the years following DeTurk's death before an effort to preserve it for historical purposes was undertaken in 1926.

=== Restoration ===
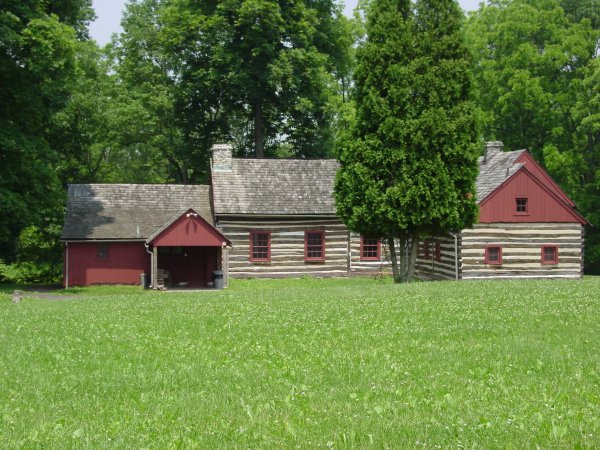
The Wayside Lodge at Daniel Boone Homestead. Built in 1940.

The Reverend A. B. Vossler of nearby Birdsboro, Pennsylvania purchased the farm with the help of William C. Foote of East Orange, New Jersey in 1926. They later sold it to the Commonwealth of Pennsylvania in 1937 in order to preserve and protect the homestead of Daniel Boone. Restoration began soon afterward and many examples of colonial life in the Oley Valley have been moved to the site of the Daniel Boone Homestead. A circa 1769 blacksmith's shop has been restored at the park as well as the "Bertolet House," an example of early 18th-century Pennsylvania German architecture.

== Daniel Boone's youth ==
Daniel Boone was born on October 22, 1734. Because the Gregorian calendar was adopted during Boone's lifetime, his birth date is given as November 2, 1734 (the "New Style" date), although Boone always used the October date. He was the sixth of eleven children in a family of Quakers. His father, Squire Boone (1696–1765), had immigrated to Pennsylvania from the small town of Bradninch, England in 1713. Squire Boone's parents George and Mary Boone followed their son to Pennsylvania in 1717, and in 1720 built a log cabin at Boonecroft. In 1720, Squire, who worked primarily as a weaver and a blacksmith, married Sarah Morgan (1700–1777), whose family members were Quakers from Wales.

Boone spent his early years on what was then the western edge of the Pennsylvania frontier. The pacifist Quakers generally had good relations with the Native Americans—but the steady growth of the white population compelled many Indians to relocate further west. Boone received his first rifle in 1749, beginning his lifelong love of hunting. Folk tales often emphasized Boone's skills as a hunter. In one story, the young Boone is hunting in the woods with some other boys. The scream of a panther scatters the boys, except for Boone, who calmly cocks his squirrel gun and shoots the animal through the heart just as it leaps at him. As with so many tales about Boone, the story may or may not be true, but it was told so often that it became part of the popular image of the man.

== See also ==
- Open-air museum
