= Carl Furillo =

American baseball player (1922–1989)

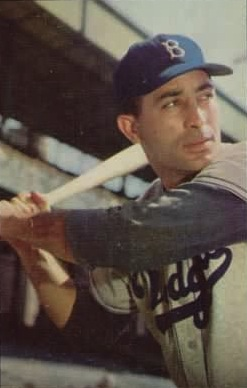
- Furillo, c. 1953
- Outfielder
- Born: March 8, 1922; Stony Creek Mills, Pennsylvania, U.S.
- Died: January 21, 1989 (aged 66); Stony Creek Mills, Pennsylvania, U.S.
- Batted: Right Threw: Right

MLB debut
- April 16, 1946, for the Brooklyn Dodgers

Last MLB appearance
- May 7, 1960, for the Los Angeles Dodgers

MLB statistics
- Batting average: .299
- Home runs: 192
- Runs batted in: 1,058
- Stats at Baseball Reference

Teams
- Brooklyn / Los Angeles Dodgers (1946–1960)

Career highlights and awards
- 2× All-Star (1952, 1953); 2× World Series champion (1955, 1959); NL batting champion (1953)

Carl Anthony Furillo (March 8, 1922 – January 21, 1989), nicknamed "the Reading Rifle" and "Skoonj", was an American professional baseball player who played in Major League Baseball (MLB), spending his entire career with the Brooklyn/Los Angeles Dodgers, primarily as a right fielder.

A member of seven National League (NL) champion teams between 1947 and 1959, Furillo batted over .300 five times, winning the 1953 batting title, with a .344 average—then the highest by a right-handed hitting Dodger since 1900. Noted for his strong and accurate throwing arm, he recorded ten or more assists in nine consecutive seasons, leading the league twice, and retired with the fifth-most games in right field (1,408) in NL history.

== Early years ==
Furillo was born in Stony Creek Mills, Pennsylvania. He was born from Italian immigrants from Campania. His father was from the province of Caserta and his mother was from the province of Benevento.

He was affectionately called "Skoonj", a nickname derived from the Italian word scungilli ("conch"), which was his favorite dish.

Furillo dropped out of school in the eighth grade and began working in various jobs, including apple-picking and work in a woolen mill. He continued to play baseball in his spare time. After the death of his mother, when he was eighteen, he decided to pursue baseball professionally.

== Professional career ==
=== Minor leagues and military service ===
In 1940, Furillo signed with the Reading Chicks of the Interstate League, earning one of his nicknames with his powerful arm: "the Reading Rifle"; the Dodgers were sufficiently impressed by his ability that they purchased the entire minor league franchise to acquire him. Following the 1941 season with the Reading Brooks (renamed after being acquired by the Dodgers), he was assigned to the Montreal Royals of the International League where he batted .281 in 129 games.

Furillo's career was interrupted by the Second World War. In 1942, he enlisted in the United States Army and served for three years. He served in combat in the Pacific Theater, receiving three battle stars and the Purple Heart for being wounded in action.

=== Major leagues ===
Upon returning from the army, Furillo reported to the Dodgers camp in Sanford, Florida for "advanced training" which had been designed for returning servicemen. He made the major leagues in 1946. The following season, he batted .295 for the 1947 NL pennant winners, finishing the year ninth in the league with 88 runs batted in.

Furillo was one of the key members on the Dodgers' 1949 champions, hitting .322 (4th in the NL) with 18 home runs, and placing among the league's top ten players in RBI (106), slugging average (.506), hits (177), runs (95), triples (10) and total bases (278); he finished sixth in the voting for the MVP Award. In 1950 he batted .305 (7th in the league) with 18 home runs, 106 RBI, and a career-high 99 runs. He achieved a personal best with 197 hits, finishing third in the NL for the second year in a row, for the 1951 team which lost a legendary pennant playoff to the New York Giants; he also batted .295 (9th in the NL) with 91 RBI and 93 runs.

He became skilled at negotiating balls hit off the high right-field wall at Ebbets Field, and after he led the NL in assists in both 1950 (18) and 1951 (24), opposing runners were increasingly reluctant to challenge his arm. On August 27, 1951, he threw out Pittsburgh Pirates pitcher Mel Queen by two feet at first base after Queen had apparently singled into right field. During spring training of 1952, the New York Journal-American called Furillo "one of the best players in the game," calling his style one of "close mechanical perfection."

Furillo batted only .247 for the 1952 pennant winners, though he was selected to his first All-Star team. Diagnosed with cataracts, he had surgery in the offseason and returned with perhaps his best season, winning the batting title and collecting 21 home runs and 92 RBI with a career-best 38 doubles (3rd in the NL). His .344 average was the highest by a right-handed Dodgers hitter since Oyster Burns hit .354 in 1894; Tommy Davis bettered him with a .346 mark in 1962. He was again named an All-Star, ending the year fifth in the league in slugging (.580), and finished ninth in the MVP balloting.

Furillo's season ended on September 6 against the Giants – he was batting against Rubén Gómez in the second inning, and opposing manager Leo Durocher was yelling for Gomez to "stick it in his ear"; Furillo was hit on the wrist by a pitch, and proceeded to first base, but with a 3–2 count on the next batter, Durocher and Furillo charged towards each other. Furillo got Durocher in a headlock, and in the ensuing brawl, Monte Irvin of the Giants stepped on Furillo's hand, fracturing a knuckle on his little finger.

For the 1955 champions he was seventh in the league with a .314 average, along with 95 RBI and a career high of 26 homers. With the 1956 team which repeated as NL champions, earning the team's seventh pennant in ten years, he slipped to a .289 average but maintained solid power totals with 21 homers, 83 RBI and 30 doubles. He hit .306 in the Dodgers' last season in Brooklyn in 1957, and batted .290 in their first year in Los Angeles, finishing eighth in the league with 83 RBI. With the 1959 pennant team, his playing time was reduced to only 50 games, with just 25 of them in the outfield. But he had one last highlight in the playoff series against the Milwaukee Braves when he beat out a ground ball in the 12th inning of the second and final game, with Gil Hodges scoring from second base to win the NL pennant.

The Dodgers released Furillo in May 1960 while he was injured with a torn calf muscle; he sued the team, claiming they released him to avoid both the higher pension due a 15-year player and medical expenses, eventually collecting $21,000. He later maintained he was blackballed as a result and was unable to find a job within the sport – a charge denied by Commissioner Ford Frick.

=== World Series exploits ===
Furillo had an excellent 1947 World Series, batting .353 in a seven-game loss; he had two RBI and scored a run in a 9–8 Game 3 victory, and scored the run which gave Brooklyn the lead for good in an 8–6 win in Game 6. He preserved a 6–5 victory in Game 5 of the 1952 World Series when he made a spectacular catch over the fence of an apparent home run by Johnny Mize – who had already homered three times in the Series – with one out in the eleventh inning.

In the 1953 World Series he hit .333, and drove in the tying run in the seventh inning of Game 1, though Brooklyn went on to lose; in the final Game 6, his 2-run homer with one out in the ninth tied the game 3–3, but New York scored in the bottom of the inning to win the game and the Series.

In the victorious 1955 Series he started the scoring with a solo home run in his first at bat of Game 1, which New York won 6–5. In Game 7, he advanced Roy Campanella to third base on a groundout in the fourth inning, with Campanella later scoring, and was walked intentionally with one out and runners on second and third in the sixth, with another run following on a sacrifice fly by Hodges. The two runs held up for a 2–0 victory, and Brooklyn earned the only World Series title in franchise history.

== Statistical summary ==
In his 15-year career, Furillo batted .299 with 192 home runs, 1,910 hits, 1,058 RBI, 895 runs, 324 doubles, 56 triples, 48 stolen bases, a .458 slugging average and 514 walks for a .355 on-base percentage. As an outfielder, he had 3,322 putouts, 151 assists, 34 double plays and 74 errors for 3,547 total chances and a .979 fielding percentage. If he had one more hit in his career, he would have statistically had a .300 batting average.

Furillo played in seven World Series with the Dodgers, six of them against the New York Yankees, winning in 1955 and in 1959 against the Chicago White Sox. In 40 World Series games, he batted .266 (34-for-128) with 13 runs, 9 doubles, 2 home runs, 13 RBI and 13 walks.

Category	G	BA	AB	R	H	2B	3B	HR	RBI	SB	CS	BB	SO	OBP	SLG	OPS	TB	PO	A	DP	E	FLD%	Ref.
Total	1,806	.299	6,378	895	1,910	324	56	192	1,058	48	50	514	436	.355	.458	.813	2,922	3,322	151	34	74	.979	

== After baseball ==
After retiring as a player, Furillo left the sport for good. While writing his 1972 book The Boys of Summer about the 1952 and 1953 pennant-winning teams, author Roger Kahn located Furillo installing elevators at the World Trade Center. During the mid-1960s, he owned and operated a deli in Flushing, Queens. Furillo later worked as a night watchman.

It was later reported by former teammates that Furillo overcame his bitterness towards baseball and became a regular attender of fantasy baseball camps at Dodgertown in Vero Beach, Florida, towards the end of his life.

Furillo developed leukemia, and died in Stony Creek Mills, Pennsylvania, at 66 years of age of an apparent heart attack. He was survived by his wife Fern (née Reichart), his two sisters, his sons, and five grandchildren. He is interred at Forest Hills Memorial Park in Reiffton, Pennsylvania. Although Furillo felt that baseball completely forgot about him and his accomplishments, his funeral was attended by a number of his former Dodger teammates, including Hall of Famer Sandy Koufax who was once Furillo's roommate as a young pitcher.

== See also ==
- List of Major League Baseball batting champions
- List of Major League Baseball career assists as a right fielder leaders
- List of Major League Baseball career double plays as a right fielder leaders
- List of Major League Baseball career putouts as a right fielder leaders
- List of Major League Baseball career runs batted in leaders
- List of Major League Baseball players who spent their entire career with one franchise
