= Exeter Township, Berks County, Pennsylvania =

Township in Pennsylvania, US

Exeter Township
- Township
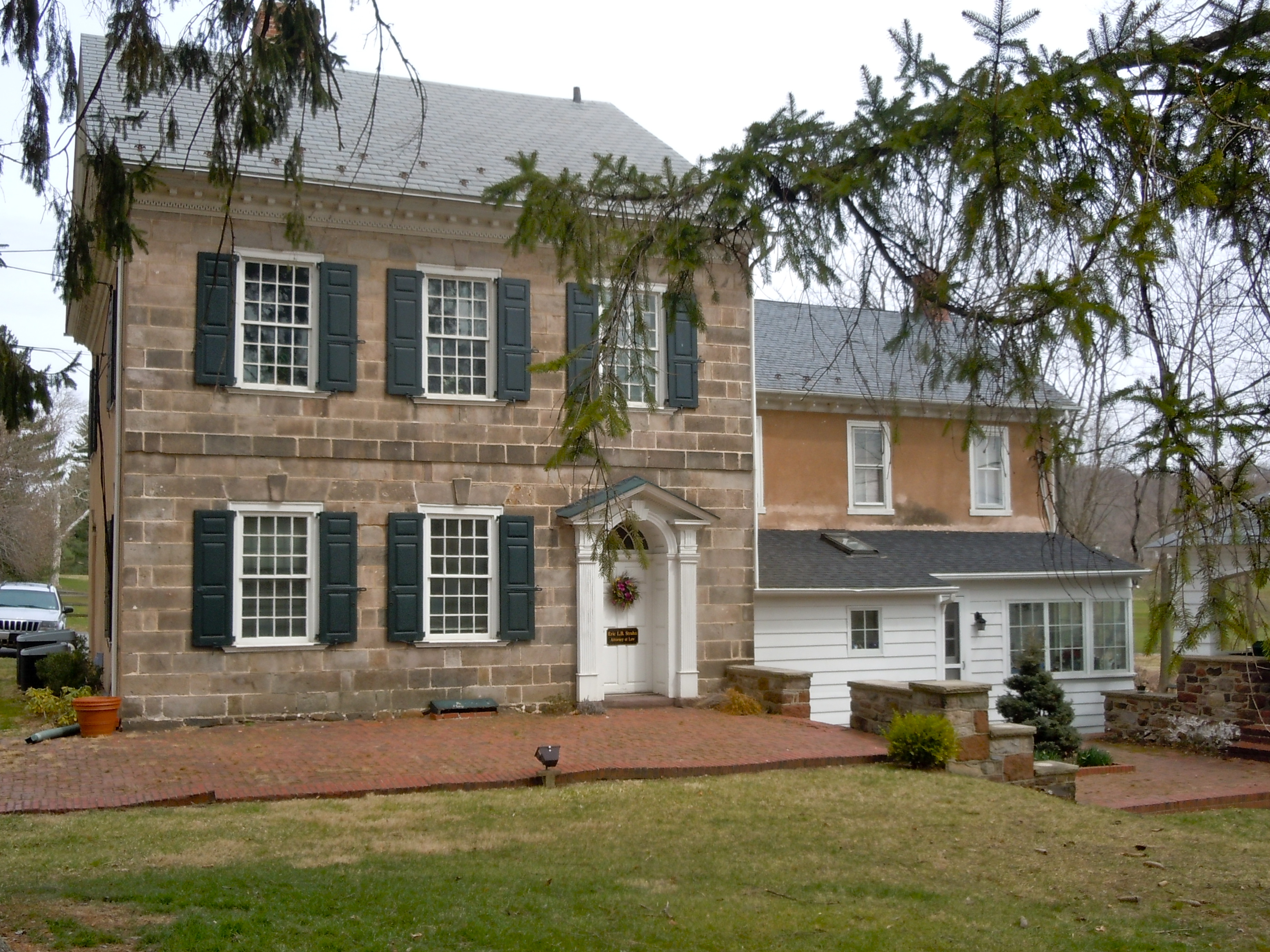
- John Bishop House

- Seal

- Location of Exeter Township in Berks County, Pennsylvania (left) and of Berks County in Pennsylvania (right)

- Location of Exeter Township in Pennsylvania Exeter Township (the United States)
- Coordinates: 40°18′48″N 75°51′12″W
- Country: United States
- State: Pennsylvania
- County: Berks

Area
  - Total: 24.59 sq mi (63.69 km^{2})
  - Land: 24.26 sq mi (62.83 km^{2})
  - Water: 0.33 sq mi (0.85 km^{2})
- Elevation: 279 ft (85 m)

Population (2020)
  - Total: 25,500 ▼
  - Estimate (2021): 25,483
  - Density: 1,063.4/sq mi (410.57/km^{2})
- Time zone: UTC-5 (EST)
  - Summer (DST): UTC-4 (EDT)
- Area codes: 610
- FIPS code: 42-011-24384
- Website: www.exetertownship.com

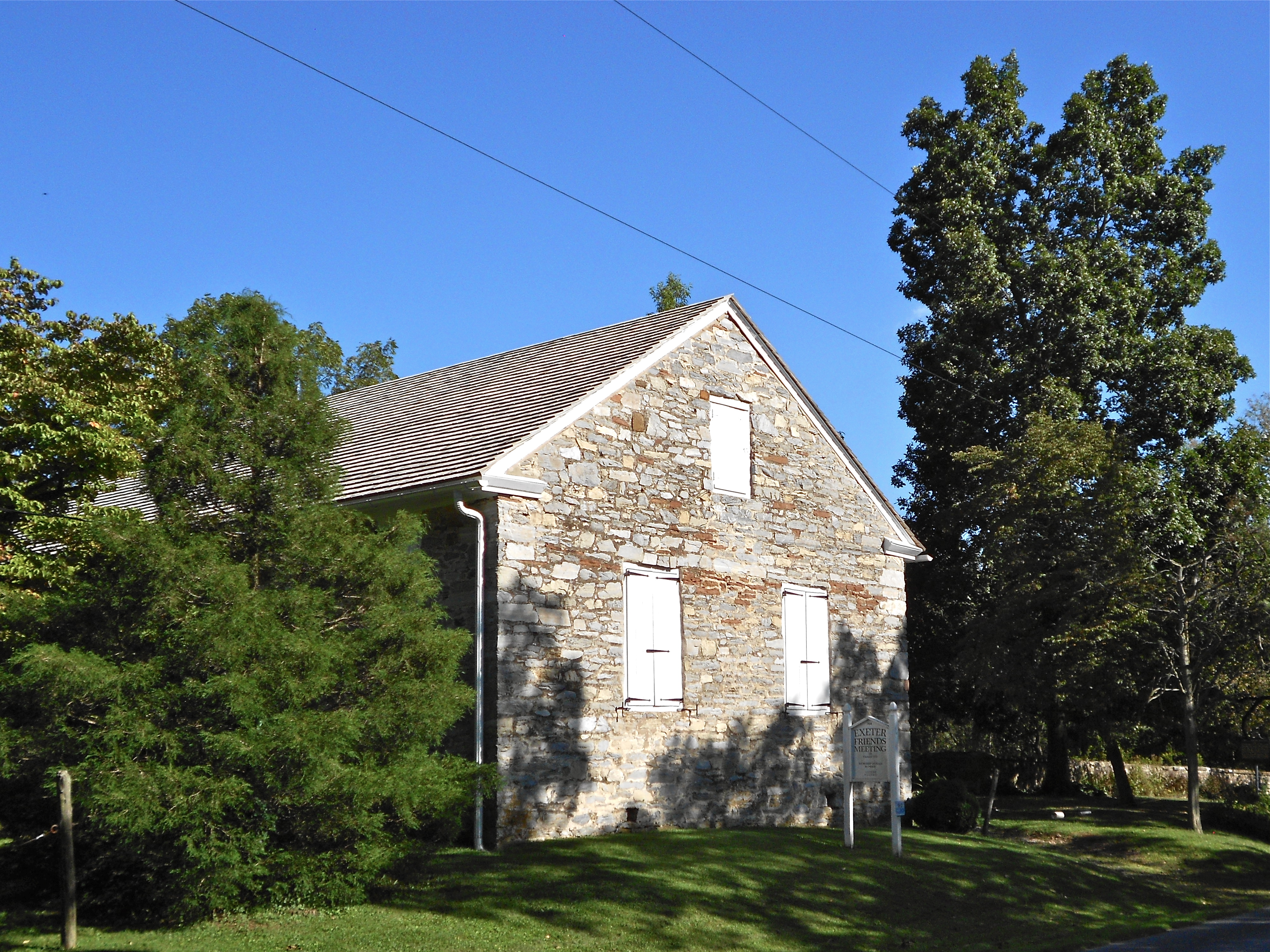
Exeter Friends Meeting House in Exeter Township where the ancestors of Daniel Boone and Abraham Lincoln were mutual Quaker church members

Exeter Township is a township in Berks County, Pennsylvania, United States. The population was 25,500 as of the 2020 census, making it the third-most populous municipality in Berks County after the city of Reading and Spring Township. Daniel Boone Homestead is within its borders. This formerly rural township is now made up of mostly sprawl-oriented developments along U.S. Route 422 (Perkiomen Avenue) and Route 562 (St. Lawrence Avenue/Boyertown Pike).

== History ==
The name Exeter derives from the town of Exeter in Devon, England. Numerous other places have also been given the name Exeter.

The John Bishop House, Boonecroft, Exeter Friends Meeting House, Levan Farm, Mordecai Lincoln House, Mill Tract Farm, and Snyder Mill are listed on the National Register of Historic Places.

== Origin ==
Exeter Township is believed to have been first settled in 1701. Swedes, relocating from the Philadelphia and Delaware River areas, settled in what is now Amity Township. In 1712, Isaac DeTurk moved from Esopus, New York to Oley and began a settlement there. It was a mix of French Huguenots, Germans, Quakers and Swiss. In 1740, they petitioned Philadelphia County for Oley to become its own Township. Exeter Township was founded December 7, 1741. Previously considered part of Oley Township, the area's residents petitioned Philadelphia County to become a separate Township six months after the establishment of Oley. The petitioners were: James Boone, Benjamin Boone, John Boone, Squire Boone, John Hughes, William Hughes, Francis Yarnell, Peter Yarnell, Michael Warren, Peter Huyett, Peter Higo, David Gerrad, Ezekiel Mathias, Roger Rogers, Joseph Brown, Jacob Vetter, and Ellis Hughes. These petitioners represent our Quaker background, and mostly resided in the area around the Quaker Meetinghouse and the Monocacy and Limekiln creeks. The actual name of the Township, "Exeter", is generally credited to the George Boone family. That family was from a town called Bradninch, England, just outside the town of Exeter. Many similarities still exist between the two cities, among them being the geography, soil type, and proximity to a town called St. Lawrence.

== Early residents and communities ==
The first community created in Exeter was called Snydersville. It was populated mostly by relatives of Hans Schneider from the Limekiln area. It contained stores, schools, mills, and even a hotel. Some of the other communities that developed early were: Baumstown, Black Bear, Jacksonwald, St. Lawrence, Stonersville, Stonetown, Lorane, and Neversink Station.

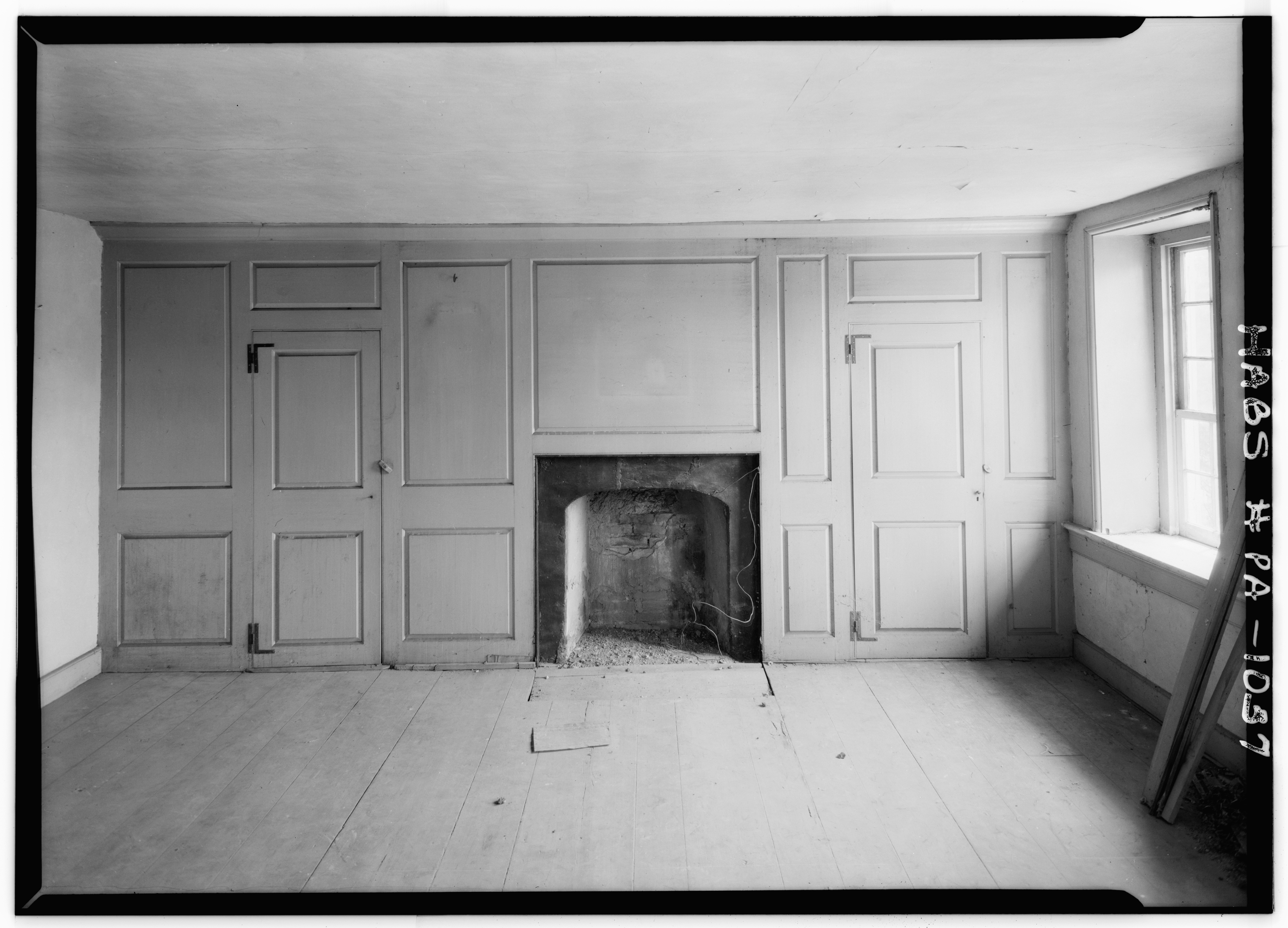
Photo of an apartment in Stonersville, August 1958. Taken by Cervin Robinson.

George Boone and family were one of the most influential families in Exeter. At one time they owned over 1,000 acres (4 km^{2}) of land in the Township and were among the petitioners to form the Township. Of course there's Daniel Boone as well, who we know grew up in Exeter and went on to become famous in his journeys from Kentucky to Missouri. Another important name is Lincoln. Abraham Lincoln's great-great grandfather, Mordecai had a homestead that is still standing along Heister's creek.

== Growth ==
Through the 19th and 20th centuries, Exeter began to grow due to the need for connections, between the city of Reading, Oley, Boyertown, Birdsboro, and King of Prussia. Trolley lines pushed through the Township, in the Farming Ridge area on its way to Boyertown and in the Reiffton area headed towards Birdsboro. Suburban sprawl following World War II booster Exeter's population. The Route 422 Expy to King of Prussia was completed in the 1980s.

== Geography ==
According to the U.S. Census Bureau, the township has a total area of 24.6 square miles (64 km^{2}), of which 24.4 square miles (63 km^{2}) is land and 0.2 square miles (0.52 km^{2}) (0.77%) is water. It is drained by the Schuylkill River, which forms its natural southern boundary. While areas closer to the river are low-lying, the northwestern area of the township is in the South Mountains and exceeds 250 metres (820 feet) at its highest elevation.

Adjacent townships and boroughs

- Lower Alsace Township (west)
- Alsace Township (north)
- Oley Township (northeast)
- Amity Township (east)
- Robeson Township (south)
- Cumru Township (southwest)
- St. Lawrence (west)
- Birdsboro (southeast)

Unincorporated communities in the township include Baumstown, Five Points (also in Alsace Township,) Jacksonwald, Limekiln (also in Oley Township,) Lorane, Neversink, Pennside (also in Lower Alsace Township,) Reiffton, Stony Creek Mills (also in Lower Alsace Township,) Stonersville, and Stonetown.

=== Climate ===
Exeter Township has a hot-summer humid continental climate (Dfa) and average monthly temperatures in Jacksonwald range from 29.9 °F in January to 74.7 °F in July. The hardiness zone is 6b.

== Transportation ==
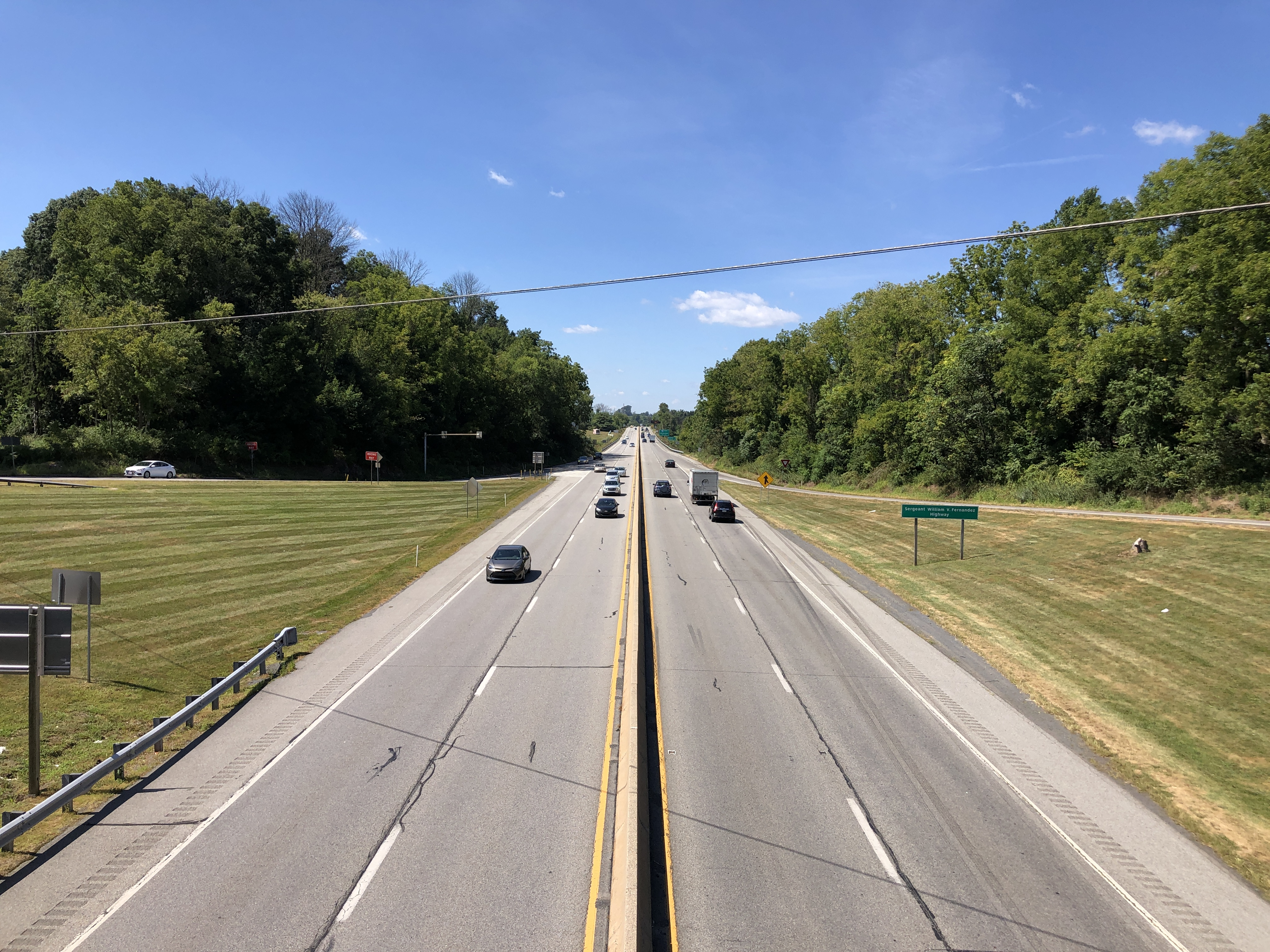
US 422 westbound in Exeter Township

As of 2019, there were 137.33 miles (221.01 km) of public roads in Exeter Township, of which 21.45 miles (34.52 km) were maintained by the Pennsylvania Department of Transportation (PennDOT) and 115.88 miles (186.49 km) were maintained by the township.

U.S. Route 422 and Pennsylvania Route 562 are east-to-west routes across the township. U.S. Route 422 Business splits off US 422 in western Exeter Township, runs northwest to St. Lawrence where PA 562 ends, then turns west for Reading, while US 422 becomes the West Shore Expressway. Major north-to-south roads include Butter Lane, Daniel Boone Road, East Neversink Road, Limekiln Road, Schoffers Road/Stonetown Road, Shelbourne Road, West Neversink Road, and Pennsylvania Route 345, which crosses the river from US 422 in Baumstown south to Birdsboro and Chester County. Oley Turnpike heads NE across the township from PA 562 just east of St. Lawrence.

Exeter Township is served by Berks Area Regional Transportation Authority (BARTA) bus routes 7 and 8, which serve residential and business areas in the township and connect the township to the BARTA Transportation Center in Reading and other points in Berks County.

== Demographics ==
Historical population
Census	Pop.	Note	%±
1980	14,419		—
1990	17,260		19.7%
2000	21,161		22.6%
2010	25,550		20.7%
2020	25,500		−0.2%
2021 (est.)	25,483		−0.1%
Source: US Census Bureau

As of the 2000 census, there were 21,161 people, 7,934 households, and 6,061 families residing in the township. The population density was 867.6 inhabitants per square mile (335.0/km^{2}). There were 8,208 housing units at an average density of 336.5 per square mile (129.9/km^{2}). The racial makeup of the township was 95.37% White, 2.05% African American, 0.10% Native American, 1.16% Asian, 0.01% Pacific Islander, 0.55% from other races, and 0.76% from two or more races. Hispanic or Latino of any race were 1.77% of the population.

There were 7,934 households, out of which 34.7% had children under the age of 18 living with them, 65.7% were married couples living together, 7.5% had a female householder with no husband present, and 23.6% were non-families. 19.3% of all households were made up of individuals, and 7.8% had someone living alone who was 65 years of age or older. The average household size was 2.64 and the average family size was 3.03.

In the township, the population was spread out, with 25.2% under the age of 18, 5.9% from 18 to 24, 30.2% from 25 to 44, 25.0% from 45 to 64, and 13.8% who were 65 years of age or older. The median age was 39 years. For every 100 females there were 95.8 males. For every 100 females age 18 and over, there were 92.2 males.

The median income for a household in the township was $56,956, and the median income for a family was $65,061. Males had a median income of $46,067 versus $31,149 for females. The per capita income for the township was $25,071. About 2.3% of families and 3.3% of the population were below the poverty line, including 3.5% of those under age 18 and 5.1% of those age 65 or over.

== School district ==
The Exeter Township School District is made up of three K-4 grade elementary schools: Lorane, Owatin Creek, and Jacksonwald; one 5-6 grade middle school: Reiffton Elementary School; one 7-8 grade junior high: Exeter Junior High School; and one 9-12 grade senior high: Exeter Township Senior High School. The school district also contains the adjacent borough of St. Lawrence.

== Parks and Recreation ==
The Parks and Recreation department is responsible for park facility maintenance, recreation activities for the community, and special Township events.

== Board of supervisors ==
Exeter Township is a second class township and governed by a board of five supervisors. Supervisors can be elected up to a six-year term. Each are compensated at the rate of $82.50 for each meeting attended with a maximum annual compensation of $4,125.

== Notable people ==
- Daniel Boone, frontiersman
- Betsy King, golfer
- Mordecai Lincoln, great-great grandfather of U.S. President Abraham Lincoln
- Jim Boscov, nephew of Albert "Albie" Boscov
- Michal Menet, 2021 NFL Draft Pick for the Arizona Cardinals
