= Lorane, Pennsylvania =

Unincorporated community in Pennsylvania, US

- Census-designated place
- Location in Pennsylvania and the United States Lorane (the United States)
- Coordinates: 40°17′40″N 75°51′10″W
- Country: United States
- State: Pennsylvania
- County: Berks
- Township: Exeter

Area
  - Total: 1.78 sq mi (4.61 km^{2})
  - Land: 1.78 sq mi (4.61 km^{2})
  - Water: 0.0039 sq mi (0.01 km^{2})
- Elevation: 203 ft (62 m)

Population (2020)
  - Total: 4,290
  - Density: 2,411.7/sq mi (931.16/km^{2})
- Time zone: UTC-5 (EST)
  - Summer (DST): UTC-4 (EDT)
- Area code: 610
- FIPS code: 42-44672

Lorane is a census-designated place (CDP) in Exeter Township, Berks County, Pennsylvania. The population was 4,236 at the 2010 census. Located on the Schuylkill River, US Route 422 runs through the town.

== History ==
Lorane was originally called Exeter Station, until the great Exeter train wreck of 1899 prompted a name change. The present name most likely was derived from Lorraine, in France. A post office was established at Exeter Station in 1861, the post office was renamed Lorane in 1900, and remained in operation until it was discontinued in 1955.

== Geography ==
Lorane is located at 40°17′40″N 75°51′10″W (40.294389, -75.852656). According to the U.S. Census Bureau, Lorane has a total area of 1.6 square miles (4.1 km^{2}), all land.

== Demographics ==
Historical population
Census	Pop.	Note	%±
2020	4,290		—
U.S. Decennial Census

=== 2020 census ===
As of the 2020 census, Lorane had a population of 4,290. The median age was 45.7 years. 18.6% of residents were under the age of 18 and 22.8% of residents were 65 years of age or older. For every 100 females there were 93.3 males, and for every 100 females age 18 and over there were 90.7 males age 18 and over.

99.3% of residents lived in urban areas, while 0.7% lived in rural areas.

There were 1,717 households in Lorane, of which 24.9% had children under the age of 18 living in them. Of all households, 54.6% were married-couple households, 15.7% were households with a male householder and no spouse or partner present, and 22.8% were households with a female householder and no spouse or partner present. About 25.3% of all households were made up of individuals and 13.9% had someone living alone who was 65 years of age or older.

There were 1,799 housing units, of which 4.6% were vacant. The homeowner vacancy rate was 1.2% and the rental vacancy rate was 7.6%.

Racial composition as of the 2020 census
Race	Number	Percent
White	3,606	84.1%
Black or African American	151	3.5%
American Indian and Alaska Native	7	0.2%
Asian	121	2.8%
Native Hawaiian and Other Pacific Islander	0	0.0%
Some other race	109	2.5%
Two or more races	296	6.9%
Hispanic or Latino (of any race)	345	8.0%

=== 2000 census ===
At the 2000 census, there were 2,994 people, 1,160 households, and 864 families living in the CDP. The population density was 1,899.6 inhabitants per square mile (733.4/km^{2}). There were 1,206 housing units at an average density of 765.2 per square mile (295.4/km^{2}). The racial makeup of the CDP was 96.46% White, 1.97% African American, 0.10% Native American, 0.60% Asian, 0.03% Pacific Islander, 0.13% from other races, and 0.70% from two or more races. Hispanic or Latino of any race were 1.34%.

There were 1,160 households, 31.7% had children under the age of 18 living with them, 64.3% were married couples living together, 7.0% had a female householder with no husband present, and 25.5% were non-families. 21.4% of households were made up of individuals, and 11.4% were one person aged 65 or older. The average household size was 2.58 and the average family size was 3.01.

The age distribution was 23.6% under the age of 18, 6.5% from 18 to 24, 29.2% from 25 to 44, 26.0% from 45 to 64, and 14.7% 65 or older. The median age was 40 years. For every 100 females, there were 95.7 males. For every 100 females age 18 and over, there were 92.9 males.

The median household income was $56,303 and the median family income was $61,673. Males had a median income of $40,821 versus $34,327 for females. The per capita income for the CDP was $22,920. About 2.5% of families and 4.3% of the population were below the poverty line, including 4.3% of those under age 18 and 8.6% of those age 65 or over.

== Parks and Recreation ==
Lorane's only park is Lorane Hollow Park on Lorane Hollow Park Drive.
