= Bipolar II disorder =

Bipolar spectrum disorder

- Other names: BD-II, type two bipolar, bipolar type two, manic-depressive illness
- Specialty: Psychiatry, clinical psychology
- Complications: Suicide, self-harm
- Causes: Environmental and genetic
- Risk factors: Family history, child abuse, long term stress
- Differential diagnosis: Bipolar I disorder, bipolar disorder not otherwise specified
- Treatment: Medication; psychotherapy
- Medication: Mood stabilizers; antipsychotics
- Frequency: 1%
- Deaths: 15-20% die by suicide

Bipolar II disorder (BD-II) is a mood disorder on the bipolar spectrum, characterized by at least one episode of hypomania and at least one episode of major depression. Diagnosis for BD-II requires that the individual must never have experienced a full manic episode. Otherwise, one manic episode meets the criteria for bipolar I disorder (BD-I).

Bipolar II Disorder is a mood disorder characterized by alternating periods of depression and hypomania, a less severe form of mania. Individuals with Bipolar II experience episodes of major depression, marked by symptoms like persistent sadness, fatigue, and loss of interest in activities, as well as episodes of hypomania, which involve elevated mood, increased energy, and impulsivity, but without distinguished manic episodes which are seen in Bipolar I Disorder.

The disorder is often underdiagnosed due to its hypomanic episodes not being as disruptive as the full mania seen in Bipolar I. Bipolar II tends to be chronic and can significantly impact a person's social, professional, and emotional life. Though the causes are not fully understood, a combination of genetic, environmental, and neurobiological factors is believed to play a role.

Bipolar II is typically managed through a combination of medication, such as mood stabilizers, atypical antipsychotics, as well as psychotherapy. Antidepressant use in bipolar disorder is controversial, with some studies finding benefit, while others find risks of switching to hypomania or worsening of rapid cycling.

Early diagnosis and treatment can help mitigate the intensity and frequency of mood episodes. Hypomania is a sustained state of elevated or irritable mood that is less severe than mania yet may still significantly affect the quality of life and result in permanent consequences including reckless spending, damaged relationships and poor judgment. Unlike mania, hypomania cannot include psychosis. The hypomanic episodes associated with BD-II must last for at least four days.

Commonly, depressive episodes are more frequent and more intense than hypomanic episodes. Additionally, when compared to BD-I, type II presents more frequent depressive episodes and shorter intervals of well-being. The course of BD-II is more chronic and consists of more frequent cycling than the course of BD-I. Finally, BD-II is associated with a greater risk of suicidal thoughts and behaviors than BD-I or unipolar depression. BD-II is no less severe than BD-I, and types I and II present equally severe burdens.

BD-II is notoriously difficult to diagnose. Patients usually seek help when they are in a depressed state, or when their hypomanic symptoms manifest themselves in unwanted effects, such as high levels of anxiety, or the seeming inability to focus on tasks. Because many of the symptoms of hypomania are often mistaken for high-functioning behavior or simply attributed to personality, patients are typically not aware of their hypomanic symptoms. In addition, many people with BD-II have periods of normal affect. As a result, when patients seek help, they are very often unable to provide their doctor with all the information needed for an accurate assessment; these individuals are often misdiagnosed with unipolar depression.

BD-II is more common than BD-I, while BD-II and major depressive disorder have about the same rate of diagnosis. Substance use disorders (which have high co-morbidity with BD-II) and periods of mixed depression may also make it more difficult to accurately identify BD-II. Despite the difficulties, it is important that BD-II individuals be correctly assessed so that they can receive the proper treatment. Antidepressant use, in the absence of mood stabilizers, is correlated with worsening BD-II symptoms.

== Signs and symptoms ==
Bipolar disorder is characterized by marked swings in mood, activity, and behavior. BP-II features periods of hypomania, which may occur before, after, or independently of a depressive episode. Of the two polarities experienced in BP-II, depression typically predominates.

=== Hypomania ===
Hypomania is the signature characteristic of BP-II, defined by an experience of elevated mood. A patient's mood is typically cheerful, enthusiastic, euphoric, or irritable. In addition, they can present with symptoms of inflated self-esteem or grandiosity, decreased need for sleep, talkativeness or pressured speech, flight of ideas or rapid cycling of thoughts, distractibility, increased goal-directed activity, psychomotor agitation, and/or excessive involvement in activities that have a high potential for painful consequences (engaging in unrestrained buying sprees, sexual indiscretions, or foolish business investments.)

Hypomania is distinct from mania. During a typical hypomanic episode, patients may present as upbeat, may show signs of poor judgment or display signs of increased energy despite lack of sleep, but do not meet the full criteria for an acute manic episode. Patients may display elevated confidence, but do not express delusional thoughts as in mania. They can experience increase in goal-directed activity and creativity, but do not reach the severity of aimlessness and disorganization. Speech may be rapid, but interruptible. Patients with hypomania never present with psychotic symptoms and do not reach the severity to require psychiatric hospitalization.

For these reasons, hypomania commonly goes unnoticed. Individuals often will only seek treatment during a depressive episode, and their history of hypomania may go undiagnosed. Although hypomania may increase functioning, episodes require treatment as they may indicate increasing instability and can precipitate a depressive episode.

=== Depressive episodes ===
It is during depressive episodes that BP-II patients often seek help. Symptoms may be syndromal or subsyndromal. Of the two polarities, depression typically predominates in BP-II, potentially in as high a ratio as 39:1, though the true ratio may be lower due to under-recognition of hypomanic episodes or symptoms. Research involving clinician-adjusted daily mood journaling has produced a lower estimate of approximately 4:1.

Depressive episodes in BP-II can present similarly to those experienced in unipolar depressive disorders. Patients characteristically experience a depressed mood and may describe themselves as feeling sad, gloomy, down in the dumps, or hopeless, for most of the day, nearly every day. In children, this can present with an irritable mood. Most patients report significant fatigue, loss of energy, or tiredness. Patients or their family members may note diminished interest in usual activities such as sex, hobbies, or daily routines. Many patients report a change in appetite along with associated weight change. Sleep disturbances may be present, and can manifest as problems falling or staying asleep, frequent awakenings, excessive sleep, or difficulties getting up in the morning.

Around half of depressed patients develop changes in psychomotor activity, described as slowness in thinking, speaking, or movement. Conversely, they may also present with agitation, with inability to sit still or wringing their hands. Other signs and symptoms include changes in posture and facial expression, slowed speech, poor hygiene, unkempt appearance, feelings of guilt, shame, or helplessness, diminished ability to concentrate, nihilistic thoughts, and suicidal ideation.

Many experts in the field have attempted to find reliable differences between BP-II depressive episodes and episodes of major depressive disorder (MDD), but the data is inconsistent. However, some clinicians report that patients who came in with a depressive episode, but were later diagnosed as having bipolar disorder often presented with hypersomnia, increased appetite, psychomotor retardation, and a history of antidepressant-induced hypomania. Evidence also suggests that unlike MDD depressive episodes, BP-II depressive episodes tend to include symptoms more commonly associated with atypical depression, such as overeating or oversleeping. Other factors that can distinguish BP-II from MDD are age of onset, which is lower for BP, the frequency of recurrence, which is greater for BP-II, and bipolar disorder family history (both type 1 and 2).

=== Mood episodes with mixed features ===
A mixed episode is defined by the presence of a hypomanic or depressive episode that is accompanied by symptoms of the opposite polarity. This is commonly referred to as a mood episode with mixed features (e.g. depression with mixed features or hypomania with mixed features), but can also be referred to as mixed episodes or mixed states. For example, a patient with depression with mixed features may have a depressed mood, but has simultaneous symptoms of rapid speech, increased energy, and flight of ideas. Conversely, a patient with hypomania with mixed features will present with the full criteria for a hypomanic episode, but with concurrent symptoms of decreased appetite, loss of interest, and low energy.

Episodes with mixed features can last up to several months. They occur more frequently in patients with an earlier onset of bipolar disorder, are associated with higher frequency of episodes, and are associated with a greater risk of substance use, anxiety disorders, and suicidality. In addition, they are associated with increased treatment resistance compared to non-mixed episodes.

=== Psychosis ===
An estimated 20% of people with bipolar II disorder have experienced psychosis. Symptoms of psychosis include delusions, hallucinations, or both. Delusions are more common than hallucinations in bipolar disorder. In general, having psychotic episodes means the illness is more severe. People with psychosis have poor insight and more agitation, anxiety, and hostility.

In contrast to bipolar II, in bipolar I, more than 50% of people have experienced psychosis. Psychosis is more common during manic episodes than depressive episodes, so psychotic symptoms are more common in bipolar type I compared to bipolar type II.

=== Dissociation ===
People with bipolar disorder may develop dissociation to match each mood they experience. For some, this is done more or less intentionally, and may represent a means by which to escape trauma or pain from a depressive period, or simply to better organize one's life by setting boundaries for one's perceptions and behaviors.

== Causes ==
Multiple factors contribute to the development of bipolar spectrum disorders, although there have been very few studies conducted to examine the possible causes of BP-II specifically. While no identifiable single dysfunctions in specific neurotransmitters have been found, preliminary data has shown that calcium signal transmission, the glutamatergic system, and hormonal regulation play a role in the pathophysiology of the disease. The cause of Bipolar disorder can be attributed to misfiring neurotransmitters that overstimulate the amygdala, which in turn causes the prefrontal cortex to stop working properly. The bipolar patient becomes overwhelmed with emotional stimulation with no way of understanding it, which can trigger mania and exacerbate the effects of depression.

== Diagnosis ==
BP-II is diagnosed according to the criteria established in the American Psychiatric Association's Diagnostic and Statistical Manual of Mental Disorders, Fifth Edition (DSM-5). In addition, alternative diagnostic criteria is established in the World Health Organization's International Classification of Diseases-11th Revision (ICD-11)]. The diagnostic criteria are established from self-reported experiences from patients or their family members, the psychiatric assessment, and the mental status examination. In addition, Screening instruments like the Mood Disorders Questionnaire are helpful tools in determining a patient's status on the bipolar spectrum. In addition, certain features have been shown to increase the chances that depressed patients have a bipolar disorder, including atypical symptoms of depression like hypersomnia and hyperphagia, a family history of bipolar disorder, medication-induced hypomania, recurrent or psychotic depression, antidepressant refractory depression, and early or postpartum depression.

=== DSM-5 criteria ===
According to the DSM-5, a patient diagnosed with BP-II will have experienced at least one hypomanic episode, at least one major depressive episode, and no manic episode. Furthermore, the occurrence of the mood episodes are not better explained by schizoaffective disorder, schizophrenia, delusional disorder, or other specified or unspecified schizophrenia spectrum and other psychotic disorder. The final criteria that must be met is that the mood episodes cause clinically significant distress or impairment in social, occupational, or other important areas of functioning (from the depressive symptoms or the unpredictability of cycling between periods of depression and hypomania).

A hypomanic episode is established if a patient's symptoms last for most of the day each day for at least four days. Furthermore, three or more of the following symptoms must be present: Inflated sense of self-esteem or grandiose thoughts, feeling well rested despite getting low amounts of sleep (3 hours), talkativeness, racing thoughts, distractibility, and increase in goal-directed activity or psychomotor agitation, or excessive involvement in activities with high risk of painful consequences. Per DSM-5 criteria, a major depressive episode consists of the presence of a depressed mood or loss of interest/pleasure in activities (anhedonia). In addition to the former symptoms, five out of the nine following symptoms must occur for more than two weeks (to the extent in which it impairs functioning): weight loss/gain, insomnia or hypersomnia, psychomotor agitation or retardation, fatigue, feelings of worthlessness/inappropriate guilt, decreased concentration, or thoughts of death/suicide.

Specifiers:

- With current or most recent episode hypomanic or depressed
- With partial remission or full remission
- With mild, moderate, or severe severity
- With anxious distress
- With catatonic features
- With mood congruent psychotic features
- With peripartum onset
- With seasonal pattern (applies only to the pattern of major depressive episodes)
- With rapid cycling.

=== ICD-11 ===
According to the ICD-11, a BP-II patient will have experienced episodic experiences of one or more hypomanic episode and one or more major depressive episode, and no history of a manic episode or mixed episode. These symptoms cannot be explained by other diagnoses such as:

- Cyclothymia
- ADHD
- Oppositional Defiant Disorder
- Schizophrenia and other primary psychotic disorders
- Substance-Use Disorder
- Personality Disorders
- Other Mental illness
- Physical issues such as a brain tumor

The specifiers are the same as the DSM-5 with the exception of catatonic features and if symptoms have occurred with or without psychosis about 6 weeks after childbirth.

=== Differential diagnoses ===
The signs and symptoms of BP-II may overlap significantly with those of other conditions. Thus, a comprehensive history, medication review, and laboratory work are key to diagnosing BP-II and differentiating it from other conditions. The differential diagnosis of BP-II is as follows: unipolar major depression, borderline personality disorder, post traumatic stress disorder, substance use disorders, and attention deficit hyperactivity disorder.

Major differences between BP-I and BP-II have been identified in their clinical features, comorbidity rates and family histories. During depressive episodes, BP-II patients tend to show higher rates of psychomotor agitation, guilt, shame, suicidal ideation, and suicide attempts. BP-II patients have shown higher lifetime comorbidity rates of phobias, anxiety disorders, substance use, and eating disorders. In addition, there is a higher correlation between BP-II patients and family history of psychiatric illness, including major depression and substance-related disorders compared to BP-I. The occurrence rate of psychiatric illness in first degree relatives of BP-II patients was 26.5%, versus 15.4% in BP-I patients.

== Management ==
Although BP-II is a prevalent condition associated with morbidity and mortality, there has been an absence of robust clinical trials and systematic reviews that investigate the efficacy of pharmacologic treatments for the hypomanic and depressive phases of BP-II. Thus, the current treatment guidelines for the symptoms of BP-II are derived and extrapolated from the treatment guidelines in BP-I, along with limited randomized controlled trials published in the literature.

The treatment of BP-II consists of the following: treatment of hypomania, treatment of major depression, and maintenance therapy for the prevention of relapse of hypomania or depression. As BP-II is a chronic condition, the goal of treatment is to achieve remission of symptoms and prevention of self-harm in patients. Treatment modalities of BP-II include medication-based pharmacotherapy, along with various forms of psychotherapy.

=== Medications ===
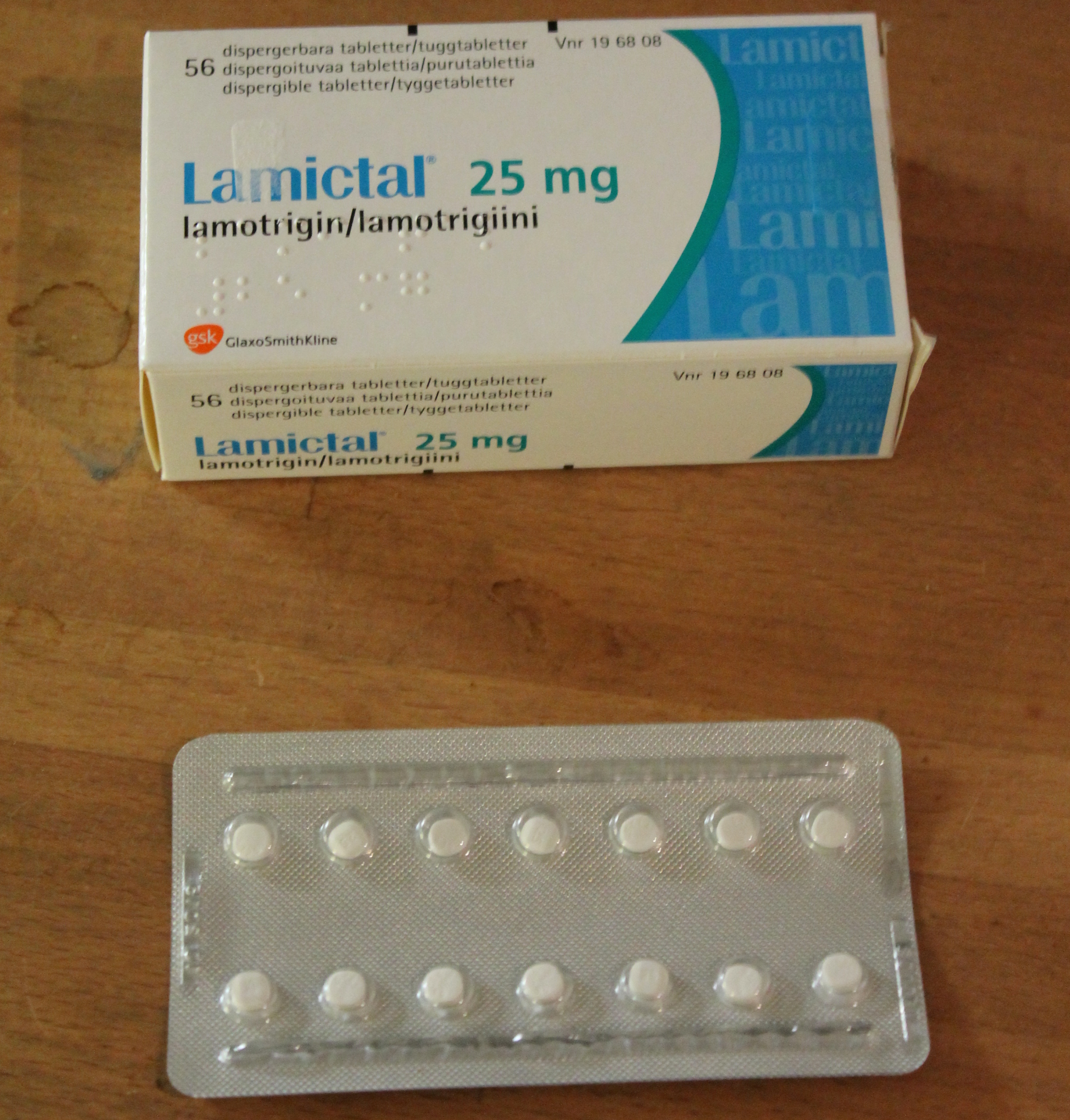
Lamotrigine (Lamictal) is an anticonvulsant that can be used as a mood stabilizer to treat BP-II.

The most common pharmacologic agents utilized in the treatment of BP-II includes mood stabilizers, atypical antipsychotics, and antidepressants, though antidepressant use in bipolar disorder is controversial.

==== Mood stabilizers ====
Mood stabilizers used in the treatment of hypomanic and depressive episodes of BP-II include lithium, and the anticonvulsant medications valproate, carbamazepine, lamotrigine, and topiramate.

There is strong evidence that lithium is effective in treating both the depressive and hypomanic symptoms in BP-II, along with the reduction of hypomanic switch in patients treated with antidepressants. Furthermore, lithium is the only mood stabilizer to demonstrate a decrease in suicide and self-harm in patients with mood disorders. In addition to preventing suicide, lithium also decreases death from all causes in people with mood disorders. Due to lithium's narrow therapeutic index, lithium levels must be monitored regularly for prevention of lithium toxicity.

There is also evidence that the anticonvulsants valproate, lamotrigine, carbamazepine, and topiramate are effective in the reduction of symptoms of hypomanic and depressive episodes of bipolar disorder. Potential mechanisms contributing to these effects include a decrease in brain excitation due to blockage of low-voltage sodium-gated channels, decrease in glutamate and excitatory amino acids, and potentiation of levels of GABA. There is evidence that lamotrigine decreases the risk of relapse in rapid-cycling BP-II. It is more effective in BP-II than BP-I, suggesting that lamotrigine is more effective for the treatment of depressive rather than manic episodes. Doses ranging from 100 to 200 mg have been reported to have the most efficacy, while experimental doses of 400 mg have rendered little response. A large, multicenter trial comparing carbamazepine and lithium over two and a half years found that carbamazepine was superior in terms of preventing future episodes of BP-II, although lithium was superior in individuals with BP-I. There is also some evidence for the use of valproate and topiramate, although the results for the use of gabapentin have been disappointing.

==== Antipsychotics ====
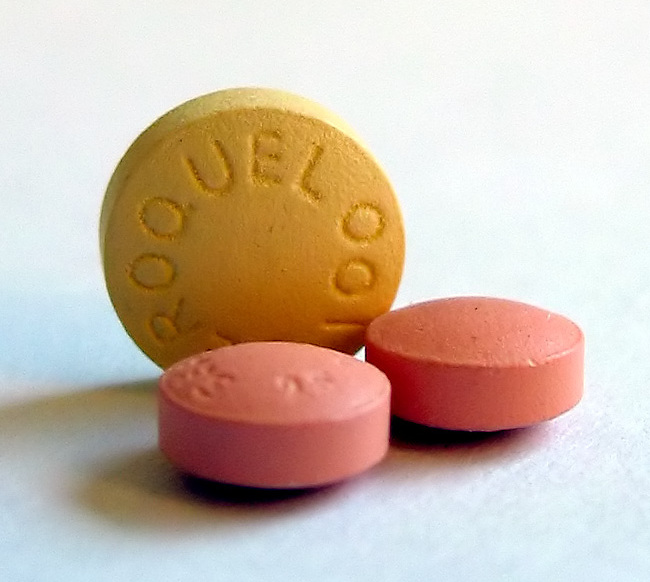
Quetiapine (Seroquel) is an atypical antipsychotic that is used to treat acute BP-II depression

Atypical antipsychotics are utilized as a second line option for hypomanic episodes, typically indicated patients who do not respond to mood stabilizers. However, quetiapine is the only antipsychotic that has demonstrated efficacy in multiple meta-analyses of randomized controlled trials for treating acute BP-II depression, and is a first-line option for patients with BP-II depression. Other atypical antipsychotics that are used to treat BP-II include lurasidone, olanzapine, cariprazine, aripiprazole, asenapine, paliperidone, risperidone, ziprasidone. First generation antipsychotics used for treatment are haloperidol and chlorpromazine. As a class, the first generation antipsychotics are associated with movement disorders, along with anticholinergic side effects compared to second generation antipsychotics (atypical antipsychotics).

==== Antidepressants ====
There is evidence to support the use of SSRI and SNRI antidepressants in BP-II, but the use of these treatments is controversial. Potential risks of antidepressant pharmacotherapy in patients with bipolar disorder include increased mood cycling, development of rapid cycling, dysphoria, and switch to hypomania. In addition, the evidence for their efficacy in bipolar depression is mixed. Thus, in most cases, antidepressant monotherapy in patients with BP-II is not recommended. However, antidepressants may provide benefit to some patients when used in addition to mood stabilizers and atypical antipsychotics, as these drugs reduce the risk of manic/hypomanic switching. However, the risk still exists, and antidepressants should be used with caution.

=== Non-pharmaceutical therapies ===
Although medication therapy is the standard of care for treatment of both BP-I and BP-II, additional non-pharmaceutical therapies can also help those with the illness. Benefits include prevention of relapse and improved maintenance medication adherence. These include psychotherapy (e.g. cognitive behavioral therapy, psychodynamic therapy, psychoanalysis, interpersonal therapy, behavioral therapy, cognitive therapy, and family-focused therapy), social rhythm therapy, art therapy, music therapy, psychoeducation, mindfulness, and light therapy.

Meta-analyses in the literature has shown that psychotherapy plus pharmacotherapy was associated with a lower relapse rate compared with patients treated with pharmacotherapy alone. However, relapse can still occur, despite continued medication and therapy.

== Prognosis ==
There is evidence to suggest that BP-II has a more chronic course of illness than BP-I. This constant and pervasive course of the illness leads to an increased risk in suicide and more hypomanic and major depressive episodes with shorter periods between episodes than BP-I patients experience. The natural course of BP-II, when left untreated, leads to patients spending the majority of their lives with some symptoms, primarily stemming from depression. Their recurrent depression results in personal distress and disability.

This disability can present itself in the form of psychosocial impairment, which has been suggested to be worse in BP-II patients than in BP-I patients. Another facet of this illness that is associated with a poorer prognosis is rapid cycling, which denotes the occurrence of four or more major Depressive, Hypomanic, and/or mixed episodes in a 12-month period. Rapid cycling is quite common in those with BP-II, much more so in women than in men (70% vs. 40%), and without treatment leads to added sources of disability and an increased risk of suicide. Women are more prone to rapid cycling between hypomanic episodes and depressive episodes.

To improve a patient's prognosis, long-term therapy is most favorably recommended for controlling symptoms, maintaining remission and preventing relapses. With treatment, patients have been shown to present a decreased risk of suicide (especially when treated with lithium) and a reduction of frequency and severity of their episodes, which in turn moves them toward a stable life and reduces the time they spend ill. To maintain their state of balance, therapy is often continued indefinitely, as around 50% of the patients who discontinue it relapse quickly and experience either full-blown episodes or sub-syndromal symptoms that bring significant functional impairments.

=== Functioning ===
The deficits in functioning associated with BP-II stem mostly from the recurrent depression that BP-II patients experience. Depressive symptoms are much more disabling than hypomanic symptoms and are potentially as, or more disabling than mania symptoms. Functional impairment has been shown to be directly linked with increasing percentages of depressive symptoms, and because sub-syndromal symptoms are more common—and frequent—in BP-II, they have been implicated heavily as a major cause of psychosocial disability.

There is evidence that shows the mild depressive symptoms, or even sub-syndromal symptoms, are responsible for the non-recovery of social functioning, which furthers the idea that residual depressive symptoms are detrimental for functional recovery in patients being treated for BP-II. It has been suggested that symptom interference in relation to social and interpersonal relationships in BP-II is worse than symptom interference in other chronic medical illnesses such as cancer. This social impairment can last for years, even after treatment that has resulted in a resolution of mood symptoms.

The factors related to this persistent social impairment are residual depressive symptoms, limited illness insight (a very common occurrence in patients with BP-II), and impaired executive functioning. Impaired ability in executive functions is directly tied to poor psychosocial functioning, a common side-effect in patients with BP-II.

The impact on a patient's psychosocial functioning stems from the depressive symptoms (more common in BP-II than BP-I). An increase in these symptoms' severity seems to correlate with a significant increase in psychosocial disability. Psychosocial disability can present itself in poor semantic memory, which in turn affects other cognitive domains like verbal memory and (as mentioned earlier) executive functioning leading to a direct and persisting impact on psychosocial functioning.

An abnormal semantic memory organization can manipulate thoughts and lead to the formation of delusions and possibly affect speech and communication problems, which can lead to interpersonal issues. BP-II patients have also been shown to present worse cognitive functioning than those patients with BP-I, though they demonstrate about the same disability when it comes to occupational functioning, interpersonal relationships, and autonomy. This disruption in cognitive functioning takes a toll on their ability to function in the workplace, which leads to high rates of work loss in BP-II patient populations. After treatment and while in remission, BP-II patients tend to report a good psychosocial functioning but they still score less than patients without the disorder. These lasting impacts further suggest that a prolonged period of untreated BP-II can lead to permanent adverse effects on functioning.

=== Recovery and recurrence ===
BP-II has a chronic relapsing nature. It has been suggested that BP-II patients have a higher degree of relapse than BP-I patients. Generally, within four years of an episode, around 60% of patients will relapse into another episode. Some patients are symptomatic half the time, either with full on episodes or symptoms that fall just below the threshold of an episode.

Because of the nature of the illness, long-term therapy is the best option and aims to not only control the symptoms but to maintain sustained remission and prevent relapses from occurring. Even with treatment, patients do not always regain full functioning, especially in the social realm. There is a very clear gap between symptomatic recovery and full functional recovery for both BP-I and BP-II patients. As such, and because those with BP-II spend more time with depressive symptoms that do not quite qualify as a major depressive episode, the best chance for recovery is to have therapeutic interventions that focus on the residual depressive symptoms and to aim for improvement in psychosocial and cognitive functioning. Even with treatment, a certain amount of responsibility is placed in the patient's hands; they have to be able to assume responsibility for their illness by accepting their diagnosis, taking the required medication, and seeking help when needed to do well in the future.

Treatment often lasts after remission is achieved, and the treatment that worked is continued during the continuation phase (lasting anywhere from 6–12 months) and maintenance can last 1–2 years or, in some cases, indefinitely. One of the treatments of choice is lithium, which has been shown to be very beneficial in reducing the frequency and severity of depressive episodes. Lithium prevents mood relapse and works especially well in BP-II patients who experience rapid-cycling. Almost all BP-II patients who take lithium have a decrease in the amount of time they spend ill and a decrease in mood episodes.

Along with medication, other forms of therapy have been shown to be beneficial for BP-II patients. A treatment called a "well-being plan" serves several purposes: it informs the patients, protects them from future episodes, teaches them to add value to their life, and works toward building a strong sense of self to fend off depression and reduce the desire to succumb to the seductive hypomanic highs. The plan has to aim high. Otherwise, patients will relapse into depression. A large part of this plan involves the patient being very aware of warning signs and stress triggers so that they take an active role in their recovery and prevention of relapse.

=== Relapse ===
Bipolar disorder is a lifelong condition, and patients should be followed up regularly for relapse prevention. Although BP-II is thought to be less severe than BP-I in regard to symptom intensity, BP-II is associated with higher frequencies of rapid cycling and depressive episodes. In the case of a relapse, patients may experience new onset sleep disturbance, racing thoughts and/or speech, anxiety, irritability, and increase in emotional intensity. Family and/or friends may notice that patients are arguing more frequently with them, spending more money than usual, are increasing their binging on food, drugs, or alcohol, and may suddenly start taking on many projects at once. These symptoms often occur and are considered early warning signs.

Psychosocial factors in a person's life can trigger a relapse in patients with BP-II. These include stressful life events, criticism from peers or relatives, and a disrupted circadian rhythm. In addition, the addition of antidepressant medications can trigger a hypomanic episode.

=== Mortality ===
Several studies have shown that the risk of suicide is slightly higher in patients who have BP-II than those with BP-I.

In results of a summary of several lifetime study experiments, it was found that 32.4% of BP-I patients experienced suicidal ideation or suicide attempts compared to 36% in BP-II patients. Bipolar disorders, in general, are the third leading cause of death in 15- to 24-year-olds. BP-II patients were also found to employ more lethal means and have more complete suicides overall. Approximately 15-20% of people with bipolar disorder die by suicide.

BP-II patients have several risk factors that increase their risk of suicide. The illness is very recurrent and results in severe disabilities, interpersonal relationship problems, barriers to academic, financial, and vocational goals, and a loss of social standing in their community, all of which increase the likelihood of suicide. Mixed symptoms and rapid-cycling, both very common in BP-II, are also associated with an increased risk of suicide. The tendency for BP-II to be misdiagnosed and treated ineffectively, or not at all in some cases, leads to an increased risk.

As a result of the high suicide risk for this group, reducing the risk and preventing attempts remains a main part of the treatment; a combination of self-monitoring, close supervision by a therapist, and faithful adherence to their medication regimen will help to reduce the risk and prevent the likelihood of suicide.

Suicide is a common cause of death for many patients with severe psychiatric illness. The mood disorders (depression and bipolar) are by far the most common psychiatric conditions associated with suicide. At least 25% to 50% of patients with bipolar disorder also attempt suicide at least once. Aside from lithium—which is the most demonstrably effective treatment against suicide—little is known about contributions of specific mood-altering treatments to minimizing mortality rates in persons with either major mood disorders or bipolar depression specifically. Suicide is usually a manifestation of severe psychiatric distress that is often associated with a diagnosable and treatable form of depression or other mental illness. In a clinical setting, an assessment of suicidal risk must precede any attempt to treat psychiatric illness.

== Epidemiology ==
The global estimated lifetime prevalence of bipolar disorder among adults range from 1 to 3 percent. The annual incidence is estimated to vary from 0.3 to 1.2 percent worldwide. According to the World Mental Health Survey Initiative, the lifetime prevalence of BP-II was found to be 0.4%, with a 12-month prevalence of 0.3%. Other meta-analyses have found lifetime prevalence of BP-II up to 1.57%. In the United States, the estimated lifetime prevalence of BP-II was found to be 1.1%, with a 12-month prevalence of 0.8%. The mean age of onset for BP-II was 20 years. Thus far, there have been no studies that have conclusively demonstrated that an unequal distribution of bipolar disorders across sex and ethnicity exists.

A vast majority of studies and meta-analysis do not differentiate between BP-I and BP-II, and current epidemiology data may not accurately describe true prevalence and incidence. In addition, BP-II is underdiagnosed in practice, and it is easy to miss milder forms of the condition. The prevalence of the larger category of bipolar spectrum disorder has been estimated to be as much as 6% of the population.

=== Comorbid conditions ===
Comorbid conditions are extremely common in individuals with BP-II. In fact, individuals are twice as likely to present a comorbid disorder than not. These include anxiety, autism, eating, personality (cluster B), and substance use disorders. For BP-II, the most conservative estimate of lifetime prevalence of alcohol or other substance use disorders is 20%. In patients with comorbid substance use disorder and BP-II, episodes have a longer duration and treatment compliance decreases. Preliminary studies suggest that comorbid substance use is also linked to increased risk of suicidality.

== History ==
In 19th century psychiatry, mania covered a broad range of intensity, and hypomania was equated by some to concepts of 'partial insanity' or monomania. A more specific usage was advanced by the German neuro-psychiatrist Emanuel Ernst Mendel in 1881, who wrote "I recommend (taking under consideration the word used by Hippocrates) to name those types of mania that show a less severe phenomenological picture, 'hypomania'".

The first diagnostic distinction to be made between manic-depression involving mania and involving hypomania came from Carl Gustav Jung in 1903. In his paper, Jung introduced the non-psychotic version of the illness with the statement, "I would like to publish a number of cases whose peculiarity consists in chronic hypomanic behavior" where "it is not a question of real mania at all but of a hypomanic state which cannot be regarded as psychotic." Jung illustrated the hypomanic variation with five case histories, each involving hypomanic behavior, occasional bouts of depression, and mixed mood states, which involved personal and interpersonal upheaval for each patient.

Narrower operational definitions of hypomania were developed from the 1960s/1970s. In 1975, Jung's original distinction between mania and hypomania gained support. Fieve and Dunner published an article recognizing that only individuals in a manic state require hospitalization. It was proposed that the presentation of either the one state or the other differentiates two distinct diseases; the proposition was initially met with skepticism. However, studies since confirm that BP-II is a phenomenologically distinct disorder.

Empirical evidence, combined with treatment considerations, led the DSM-IV Mood Disorders Work Group to add BP-II as its own entity in the 1994 publication. Only one other mood disorder was added to this edition, indicating the conservative nature of the DSM-IV work group.

In May 2013, the DSM-5 was released. Two revisions to the existing BP-II criteria were anticipated. The first expected change was to reduce the required duration of a hypomanic state from four to two days. The second change allowed for hypomania to be diagnosed without the manifestation of elevated mood; that is, increased energy/activity will be sufficient. The rationale behind the latter revision is that some individuals with BP-II manifest only visible changes in energy. Without presenting elevated mood, these individuals are commonly misdiagnosed with major depressive disorder. Consequently, they receive prescriptions for antidepressants, which unaccompanied by mood stabilizers, may induce rapid cycling or mixed states.

== Society and culture ==
- Heath Black revealed in his autobiography, Black, that he has been diagnosed with BP-II.
- Maria Bamford has been diagnosed with BP-II.
- Geoff Bullock, singer-songwriter, was diagnosed with BP-II.
- Nicky Campbell has been diagnosed with BP-II.
- Mariah Carey was diagnosed with BP-II in 2001. In 2018, it was publicly revealed she was actively seeking treatment in the form of therapy and medication.
- Charmaine Dragun, former Australian journalist/newsreader. Inquest concluded she had BP-II.
- Thomas Eagleton received a diagnosis of BP-II from Dr. Frederick K. Goodwin.
- Michael Ellsberg wrote an article for Forbes entitled "How I Overcame Bipolar II (and Saved My Own Life)."
- A. J. Finn has been diagnosed with BP-II.
- Carrie Fisher had been diagnosed with BP-II.
- George Fouracres has BP-II, which he talked about on his Instagram account when he made a post on World Bipolar Day.
- Joe Gilgun has been diagnosed with BP-II.
- Shane Hmiel has been diagnosed with BP-II.
- Jesse Jackson Jr. has been diagnosed with BP-II.
- Demi Lovato has been diagnosed with BP-II.
- Evan Perry, subject of the documentary Boy Interrupted, was diagnosed with BP-II.
- Reckful, Twitch streamer and professional esports player, was diagnosed with BP-II.
- Chappell Roan has been diagnosed with BP-II.
- Richard Rossi, filmmaker, musician, and maverick minister was diagnosed with BP-II.
- Rumer has been diagnosed with BP-II.
- Catherine Zeta-Jones received treatment for BP-II after dealing with the stress of her husband's throat cancer. According to her publicist, Zeta-Jones made a decision to check into a mental health facility for a brief stay.

== See also ==
- United States President John Adams had bipolar disorder
- Outline of bipolar disorder
- Bipolar disorder
- Bipolar I disorder
- Bipolar NOS
- Cyclothymia
- Detailed listing of DSM-IV-TR bipolar disorder diagnostics codes
- International Society for Bipolar Disorders
- Emotional dysregulation
