= 2023 Pennsylvania chocolate factory explosion =

Explosion in West Reading, Pennsylvania

- Date: March 24, 2023
- Time: 4:57 p.m. (Eastern time zone)
- Location: West Reading, Pennsylvania, United States; 40°20′04″N 75°56′31″W
- Type: Natural gas pipe leak and explosion
- Deaths: 7
- Injuries: 10

On March 24, 2023, an explosion occurred at a chocolate factory operated by the R.M. Palmer Company in West Reading, Pennsylvania. Seven people died and ten were injured, including one rescued from the rubble. At around 4:57 p.m (ET), it sent plumes of smoke into the air and shook houses. The cause of the explosion has been determined to be a natural-gas fueled explosion and fire.

== Explosion ==
At 4:30 p.m., workers at R.M. Palmer building #2 detected the smell of natural gas. They promptly reported to their supervisor, who informed them that a decision to evacuate would have to be made by a higher-up. The employees then returned to work.

The explosion started just before 5 p.m. on March 24, 2023. It destroyed building #2, while damaging the main building. The explosion contained so much force that it physically moved one of the buildings back by four feet. After the explosion, damage from it resulted in the leak of gas that began to further fuel the ensuing fires.

Reports made from Berks County, the county where West Reading is located, to Pennsylvania Emergency Management Agency included a reference to a gas leak, possibly suggesting that the incident was instigated by a leak of gas. Local authorities, however, have indicated that the official cause is unknown. Officials are still investigating the cause. The National Transportation Safety Board has characterized it as a gas explosion, and is examining a natural gas pipeline for fractures and any other sort of damage. A preliminary report was issued on May 2, 2023. A final report could take up to two years to be released.

Seven people, including 60-year-old Domingo Cruz, 49-year-old Amy Sandoe, 30-year-old Xiorky Nunez, 63-year-old Susan Halvonik, 62-year-old Michael Breedy, 44-year-old Diana Cedeno, and 55-year-old Judith Lopez-Moran, were killed. Eight people were also reported to have been sent to Reading Hospital to be treated for their injuries, where one person had been transferred and two were in fair condition, while the others had been released.

On March 25, one person had been pulled out of the rubble. Later, the victim, Mexican-American Patricia Borges, stated that she and employees had alerted their supervisor half an hour prior to the eventual explosion, but their pleas fell on deaf ears. When the explosion occurred, she was shaken off a ladder and caught on fire. She prayed to God, asking Him to save her from the fire, while attempting to flee, at which point the floor gave way and she fell into a horizontal vat of liquid chocolate in the factory's basement, which extinguished the flames. She screamed for help as the vat began to fill with water from firefighters' hoses. Crews eventually discovered her after search dogs indicated that there may have been a survivor.

== Responses ==
The following morning, state officials disputed the death toll; initial reports said five died, and later two. Police chief Wayne Holben said the explosion was not dangerous to the immediate surrounding area, but police had cleared the scene of people.

=== Company ===
On the afternoon of March 25, 2023, the R.M. Palmer Company provided the following statement:

"Everyone at RM Palmer is devastated by the tragic events at one of our West Reading facilities and we are focused on supporting our employees and their families. We have lost close friends and colleagues, and our thoughts and prayers are with the families and friends of all who have been impacted. We are sincerely grateful for the extraordinary efforts of all of the first responders and for the support of our Reading community, which has been home to our business for more than 70 years. We will continue to coordinate closely with local and national agencies to assist in the recovery process.
We are anxious to be in touch with all employees and the families of employees who have been impacted, but the company's email, phones, and other communication systems are down, and therefore we are relying currently on first responders and disaster recovery organizations to provide any available information to impacted families. We will be providing additional information and making contact with employees, impacted families, and the community as soon as possible."

— R.M. Palmer Company

The Hershey Company, a leading competitor in the candy industry, also sent a message of support to Palmer:

Our deepest condolences are with the families and loved ones, partners and fellow candy makers at the R.M. Palmer Company. We are heartbroken for them as well as the community of West Reading.
Thank you to the first responders and their dedicated work, and know that we are here to offer comfort and support to all.

— The Hershey Company

=== Government ===
The Berks County government responded by stating that the county was expressing its deepest sympathy, and is committed to supporting the community affected by the disaster. The county also urged the community to rally together and spread support to the surrounding West Reading area.

Judy Schwank, a Democratic senator from Pennsylvania, representing the state's 11th District, was said to be "deeply devastated" from what occurred, noting "This is an extremely difficult situation", and that it was unlike anything that the county had dealt with in recent memory. She also applauded the community's response, and followed by saying "I will continue to follow the situation and do everything in my power to ensure all state emergency response resources are available."

== Lawsuits ==
On March 27, 2023, a neighbor named Betty Wright filed a lawsuit against R.M. Palmer for criminal negligence and recklessness and seeking for $50,000 due to physical and emotional suffering. She claimed to have suffered cervical, lumbar, hip and leg injuries, as well as wage loss and loss of property.
