= Mixed state =

Mixed state may refer to:

- Mixed affective state, simultaneous depression and mania
- Mixed quantum state, a concept in quantum mechanics
- Mixed government, a hybrid form of government
