= Tower Health =

Health care system in Pennsylvania, US

- Formation: September 29, 2017
- Headquarters: West Reading, PA
- President & Chief Executive Officer: Michael Stern, FACHE
- Website: towerhealth.org

Tower Health is a health system based in West Reading, Pennsylvania. It was created in 2017 when the former Reading Health System acquired five hospitals.

== Financial strain ==
The 2017 formation of Tower Health represented a significant strategic expansion step by Reading Health System to extend and expand its regional presence and service capabilities. The ambitious effort came with initial fiscal strain, however. The five hospitals acquired by Reading Health System collectively recorded a $17 million operating loss for the June 30, 2017, end of fiscal year, shortly prior to the acquisition being finalized. This underlying fiscal weakness in the acquired firms demonstrates that the strategic choice to proceed with the acquisition was a aggressive step. It suggests that projected long-term benefits such as increased market share and wider geographic reach were given more importance compared to the short-term fiscal well-being of the new companies. This early financial exposure of the newly affiliated hospitals subsequently contributed to a significant part of the dire financial issues and costly expansion Tower Health would encounter in the next years, paving the way for later divestitures and hospital closures.

== See also ==
- Reading Hospital
