= Ziprasidone =

Antipsychotic medication

- Skeletal structure of ziprasidone

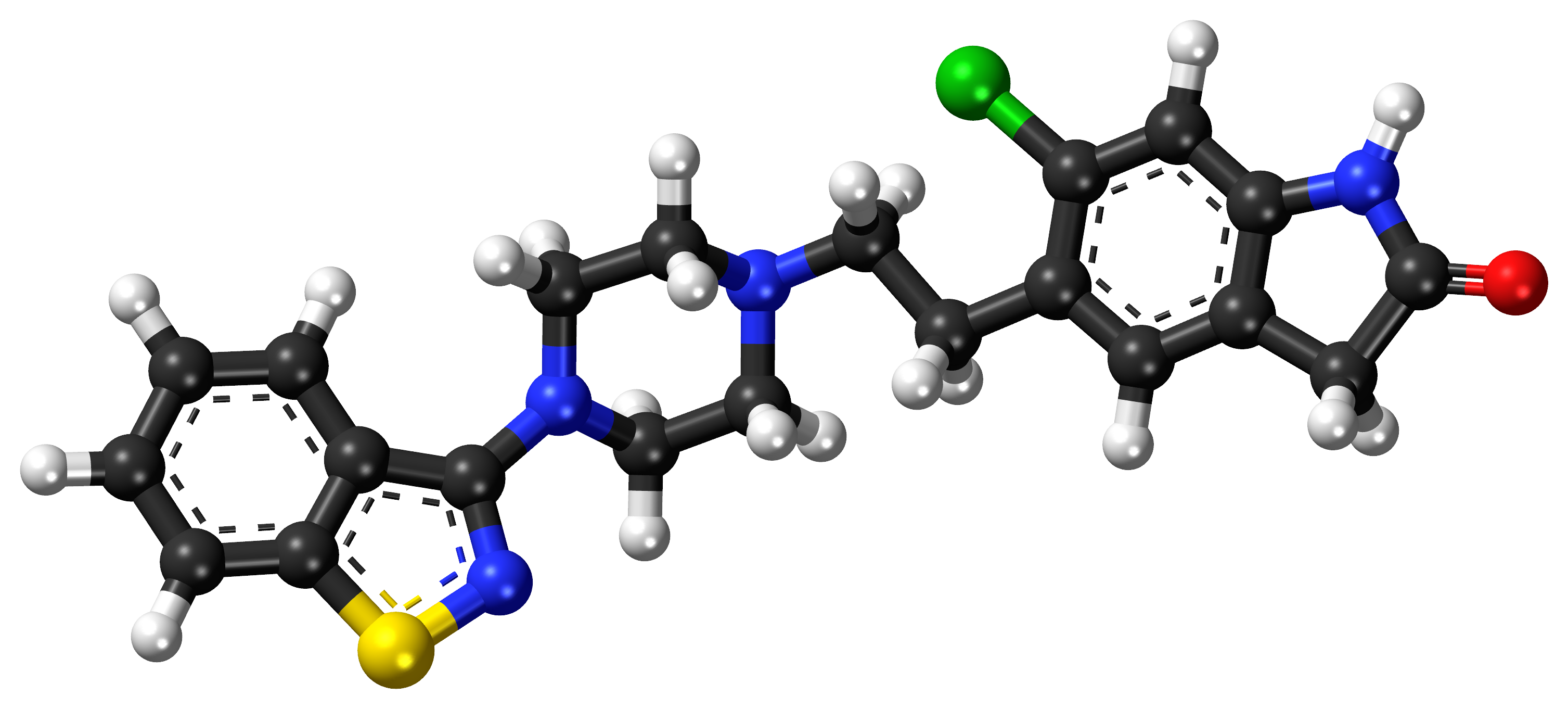
- Ball-and-stick model of ziprasidone

Clinical data
- Trade names: Geodon, others
- AHFS/Drugs.com: Monograph
- MedlinePlus: a699062
- License data: US DailyMed: Ziprasidone
- Pregnancy category: AU: C
- Routes of administration: Oral, intramuscular
- Drug class: Atypical antipsychotic
- ATC code: N05AE04 (WHO)

Legal status
- Legal status: AU: S4 (Prescription only); BR: Class C1 (Other controlled substances); US: ℞-only

Pharmacokinetic data
- Bioavailability: Oral: 60% IM: 100%
- Metabolism: Liver (aldehyde reductase)
- Elimination half-life: 7–10 hours
- Excretion: Urine and feces

Identifiers
- IUPAC name: 5-{2-[4-(1,2-benzisothiazol-3-yl)-1-piperazinyl]ethyl}-6-chloro-1,3-dihydro-2H-indol-2-one
- CAS Number: 146939-27-7
- PubChem CID: 60854
- IUPHAR/BPS: 59
- DrugBank: DB00246
- ChemSpider: 54841
- UNII: 6UKA5VEJ6X
- KEGG: D08687
- ChEBI: CHEBI:10119
- ChEMBL: ChEMBL708
- CompTox Dashboard (EPA): DTXSID4023753
- ECHA InfoCard: 100.106.954

Chemical and physical data
- Formula: C_{21}H_{21}ClN_{4}OS
- Molar mass: 412.94 g·mol^{−1}
- 3D model (JSmol): Interactive image
- SMILES: O=C1Cc2c(N1)cc(Cl)c(c2)CCN3CCN(CC3)c4nsc5ccccc45
- InChI: InChI=1S/C21H21ClN4OS/c22-17-13-18-15(12-20(27)23-18)11-14(17)5-6-25-7-9-26(10-8-25)21-16-3-1-2-4-19(16)28-24-21/h1-4,11,13H,5-10,12H2,(H,23,27); Key:MVWVFYHBGMAFLY-UHFFFAOYSA-N

Ziprasidone, sold under the brand name Geodon among others, is an atypical antipsychotic used to treat schizophrenia and bipolar disorder. It may be used by mouth and by injection into a muscle (IM). The intramuscular form may be used for acute agitation in people with schizophrenia.

Common side effects include tremors, tics, dizziness, dry mouth, restlessness, nausea, and mild sedation. Although it can also cause weight gain, the risk is much lower than for other atypical antipsychotics. How it works is not entirely clear but is believed to involve effects on serotonin and dopamine in the brain.

Ziprasidone was approved for medical use in the United States in 2001. The pills are made up of the hydrochloride salt, ziprasidone hydrochloride. The intramuscular form is the mesylate, ziprasidone mesylate trihydrate, and is provided as a lyophilized powder. In 2020, it was the 282nd most commonly prescribed medication in the United States, with more than 1 million prescriptions.

== Medical uses ==
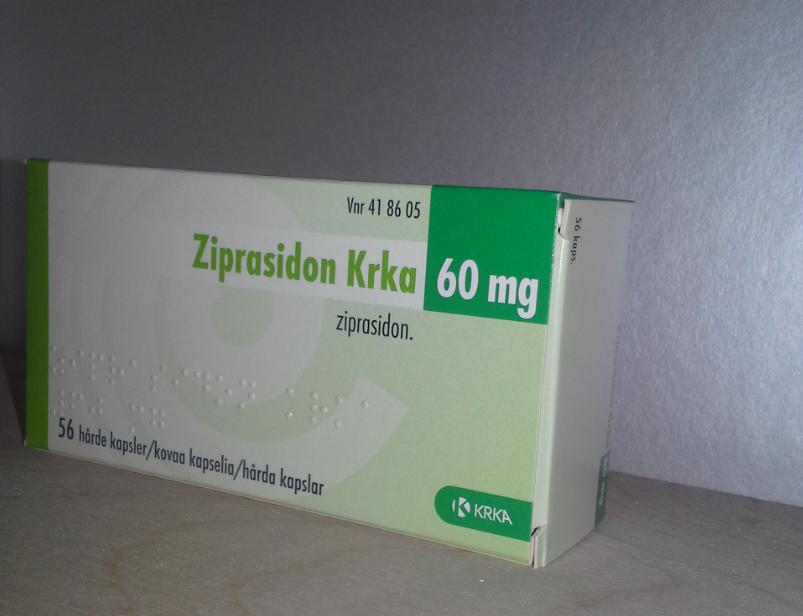
Ziprasidon Krka brand medicine.

Ziprasidone is approved by the US Food and Drug Administration (FDA) for the treatment of schizophrenia as well as acute mania and mixed states associated with bipolar disorder. Its intramuscular injection form is approved for acute agitation in schizophrenic patients for whom treatment with just ziprasidone is appropriate.

In a 2013 study in a comparison of 15 antipsychotic drugs in effectiveness in treating schizophrenic symptoms, ziprasidone demonstrated mild-standard effectiveness. Ziprasidone was 15% more effective than lurasidone and iloperidone, approximately as effective as chlorpromazine and asenapine, and 9–13% less effective than haloperidol, quetiapine, and aripiprazole. Ziprasidone is effective in the treatment of schizophrenia, though evidence from the CATIE trials suggests it is less effective than olanzapine, and equally as effective compared to quetiapine. There are higher discontinuation rates for lower doses of ziprasidone, which are also less effective than higher doses.

== Adverse effects ==
Ziprasidone (and all other second generation antipsychotics (SGAs)) received a boxed warning in the US due to increased mortality in elderly people with dementia-related psychosis.

Sleepiness and headache are very common adverse effects (>10%).

Common adverse effects (1–10%), include producing too much saliva or having dry mouth, runny nose, respiratory disorders or coughing, nausea and vomiting, stomach aches, constipation or diarrhea, loss of appetite, weight gain (but the smallest risk for weight gain compared to other antipsychotics), rashes, fast heart beats, blood pressure falling when standing up quickly, muscle pain, weakness, twitches, dizziness, and anxiety. Extrapyramidal symptoms are also common and include tremor, dystonia (sustained or repetitive muscle contractions), akathisia (the feeling of a need to be in motion), parkinsonism, and muscle rigidity; in a 2013 meta-analysis of 15 antipsychotic drugs, ziprasidone ranked 8th for such side effects.

Ziprasidone is known to trigger mania in some bipolar patients.

This medication can cause birth defects, according to animal studies, although this side effect has not been confirmed in humans.

Recently, the FDA required the manufacturers of some atypical antipsychotics to include a warning about the risk of hyperglycemia and Type II diabetes with atypical antipsychotics. Some evidence suggests that ziprasidone does not cause insulin resistance to the degree of other atypical antipsychotics, such as olanzapine. Weight gain is also less of a concern with ziprasidone compared to other atypical antipsychotics. In fact, in a trial of long term therapy with ziprasidone, overweight patients (BMI > 27) actually had a mean weight loss overall. According to the manufacturer insert, ziprasidone caused an average weight gain of 2.2 kg (4.8 lbs), which is significantly lower than other atypical antipsychotics, making this medication better for patients that are concerned about their weight. In December 2014, the FDA warned that ziprasidone could cause a potentially fatal skin reaction, Drug Reaction with Eosinophilia and Systemic Symptoms (DRESS), although this was believed to occur only rarely.

=== Discontinuation ===
The British National Formulary recommends a gradual withdrawal when discontinuing antipsychotics to avoid acute withdrawal syndrome or rapid relapse. Symptoms of withdrawal commonly include nausea, vomiting, and loss of appetite. Other symptoms may include restlessness, increased sweating, and trouble sleeping. Less commonly there may be a feeling of the world spinning, numbness, or muscle pains. Symptoms generally resolve after a short period of time.

There is tentative evidence that discontinuation of antipsychotics can result in psychosis. It may also result in reoccurrence of the condition that is being treated. Rarely tardive dyskinesia can occur when the medication is stopped.

== Pharmacology ==
=== Pharmacodynamics ===
Ziprasidone
| Site | K_{i} (nM) | Action | Ref |
|---|---|---|---|
| SERT | 112 | Blocker | |
| NET | 44 | Blocker | |
| DAT | 10000+ | ND | |
| 5-HT_{1A} | 2.5–76 | Partial agonist | |
| 5-HT_{1B} | 0.99–4.0 | Partial agonist | |
| 5-HT_{1D} | 5.1–9.0 | Partial agonist | |
| 5-HT_{1E} | 360–1279 | ND | |
| 5-HT_{2A} | 0.08–1.4 | Antagonist | |
| 5-HT_{2B} | 27.2 | Antagonist | |
| 5-HT_{2C} | 0.72–13 | Antagonist | |
| 5-HT_{3} | 10000+ | ND | |
| 5-HT_{5A} | 291 | ND | |
| 5-HT_{6} | 61–76 | Antagonist | |
| 5-HT_{7} | 6.0–9.3 | Antagonist | |
| α_{1A} | 18 | Antagonist | |
| α_{1B} | 9.0 | Antagonist | |
| α_{2A} | 160 | Antagonist | |
| α_{2B} | 48 | Antagonist | |
| α_{2C} | 59–77 | Antagonist | |
| β_{1} | 2570+ | ND | |
| β_{2} | 10000+ | ND | |
| D_{1} | 30–130 | ND | |
| D_{2} | 4.8 | Antagonist | |
| D_{2L} | 4.6 | Antagonist | |
| D_{2S} | 4.2 | Antagonist | |
| D_{3} | 7.2 | Antagonist | |
| D_{4} | 0.8–105 | Antagonist | |
| D_{4.2} | 28–39 | Antagonist | |
| D_{4.4} | 14.9 | Antagonist | |
| D_{5} | 152 | ND | |
| H_{1} | 15–130 | Antagonist | |
| H_{2} | 3500+ | ND | |
| H_{3} | 10000+ | ND | |
| H_{4} | 10000+ | ND | |
| M_{1} | 300+ | ND | |
| M_{2} | 3000+ | ND | |
| M_{3} | 1300+ | ND | |
| M_{4} | 1600+ | ND | |
| M_{5} | 1600+ | ND | |
| σ_{1} | 110 | ND | |
| σ_{2} | ND | ND | ND |
| Opioid | 1000+ | ND | |
| nACh | 10000+ | ND | |
| NMDA (PCP) | 10000+ | ND | |
| VDCC | 10000+ | ND | |
| VGSC | 2620 | ND | |
| hERG | 169 | Blocker | |
Values are K_{i} (nM). The smaller the value, the more strongly the drug binds to the site. All data are for human cloned proteins, except H_{3} (guinea pig), σ_{1} (guinea pig), opioid (rodent), NMDA/PCP (rat), VDCC, and VGSC.

==== Correspondence to clinical effects ====
Ziprasidone mostly affects the receptors of dopamine (D_{2}), serotonin (5-HT_{2A}, partially 5-HT_{1A}, 5-HT_{2C}, and 5-HT_{1D}) and epinephrine/norepinephrine (α_{1}) to a high degree, while of histamine (H_{1}) - moderately. It also somewhat inhibits reuptake of serotonin and norepinephrine, though not dopamine.

Ziprasidone's efficacy in treating the positive symptoms of schizophrenia is believed to be mediated primarily via antagonism of the dopamine receptors, specifically D_{2}. Blockade of the 5-HT_{2A} receptor may also play a role in its effectiveness against positive symptoms, though the significance of this property in antipsychotic drugs is still debated among researchers. Blockade of 5-HT_{2A} and 5-HT_{2C} and activation of 5-HT_{1A} as well as inhibition of the reuptake of serotonin and norepinephrine may all contribute to its ability to alleviate negative symptoms.; however, its effects on the 5-HT_{1A} receptor may be limited as a study found ziprasidone would likely "produce detectable occupancy [of 5-HT_{1A} receptors] only at higher doses that would produce unacceptable levels of side effects in man, although lower doses are sufficient to produce pharmacological effects." The relatively weak antagonistic actions of ziprasidone on the α_{1}-adrenergic receptor likely in part explains some of its side effects, such as orthostatic hypotension. Unlike many other antipsychotics, ziprasidone has no significant affinity for the mACh receptors, and as such lacks any anticholinergic side effects. Like most other antipsychotics, ziprasidone is sedating due primarily to serotonin and dopamine blockade.

It has also been identified as a potent vesicular monoamine transporter 2 (VMAT2) inhibitor (IC_{50} = 15 nM).

=== Pharmacokinetics ===
The systemic bioavailability of ziprasidone is 100% when administered intramuscularly and 60% when administered orally without food.

After a single dose intramuscular administration, the peak serum concentration typically occurs at about 60 minutes after the dose is administered, or earlier. Steady state plasma concentrations are achieved within one to three days. Exposure increases in a dose-related manner and following three days of intramuscular dosing, little accumulation is observed.

The bioavailability of the drug is reduced by approximately 50% if a meal is not eaten before Ziprasidone ingestion.

Ziprasidone is hepatically metabolized by aldehyde oxidase; minor metabolism occurs via cytochrome P450 3A4 (CYP3A4). Medications that induce (e.g. carbamazepine) or inhibit (e.g. ketoconazole) CYP3A4 have been shown to decrease and increase, respectively, blood levels of ziprasidone.

Its biological half-life time is 10 hours at doses of 80–120 milligrams.

== History ==
Ziprasidone is chemically similar to risperidone, of which it is a structural analogue. It was first synthesized in 1987 at the Pfizer central research campus in Groton, Connecticut.

Phase I trials started in 1995. In 1998 ziprasidone was approved in Sweden. After the FDA raised concerns about long QT syndrome, more clinical trials were conducted and submitted to the FDA, which approved the drug on February 5, 2001.

== Society and culture ==
=== Lawsuits ===
In September 2009, the U.S. Justice Department announced that Pfizer had been ordered to pay a historic fine of $2.3 billion as a penalty for fraudulent marketing of several drugs, including Geodon.

Matthew Dougherty, a 51‑year‑old former teacher and artist with a diagnosis of schizophrenia, died on May 21, 2024, at Phoenixville Hospital in Phoenixville, Pennsylvania. According to a wrongful death lawsuit filed by his family in March 2025, Dougherty had been admitted to the hospital after a mental health crisis during which he was tased by police and suffered injuries. While hospitalized, Dougherty's regular psychiatric medications were discontinued. On the evening of his death, an alarm sounded in a nearby room, causing him to become agitated. Hospital staff called the police to restrain him, and responding officers again used a taser on Dougherty. Shortly afterward, nurses administered two doses of Geodon (ziprasidone) – a total of 40 mg, an amount the lawsuit equated to "administering poison". Minutes later, Dougherty went into cardiac arrest and could not be resuscitated. The lawsuit names as defendants Tower Health, which operates Phoenixville Hospital, and seeks damages for wrongful death and negligence. At the time the suit was filed, Tower Health had not filed a response to the complaint.

=== Brand names ===
In the US, Geodon is marketed by Viatris after Upjohn was spun off from Pfizer.

== Research ==
Ziprasidone has been studied in and reported to be effective in the treatment of borderline personality disorder, but findings are mixed.
