= Edward Goljan =

American pathologist

- Born: January 29, 1943 (age 83); Prospect Park, New York, U.S.
- Education: B.S., St. Bonaventure University; M.D., Temple University
- Occupations: Physician, Pathologist, Professor

Edward Goljan, M.D. (also known as "Poppie"), is a Curriculum Coordinator, Professor of Pathology, and former Chair of Pathology at Oklahoma State University Center for Health Sciences, an osteopathic medical school in Oklahoma. In addition to his teaching and medical practice, he is well known for his development of resources for medical students studying for the USMLE and COMLEX.

Goljan formerly worked for Kaplan reviews, giving the pathology portion of the lecture course. He currently works for the Falcon Physician review lecture series. He is a contributor to and reviewer of the USMLE Consult Step 1 Question Bank published by Elsevier. He is also the author of several USMLE review books in the "Rapid Review" series, including:

- Rapid Review, Pathology
- Rapid Review, Biochemistry
- Rapid Review, Laboratory Testing in Clinical Medicine

He has been teaching USMLE preparation since 1991.

One of the reasons Goljan is particularly renowned among medical student circles is the bootleg Goljan pathology lectures (audio recordings and printed materials) commonly passed down from upperclassmen or downloaded from the Internet. These materials have helped many students achieve high scores on the USMLE and COMLEX exams, which is crucial for selection to competitive medical residency positions. Goljan is well known for elucidating ideas of pathophysiology as well as for his humor.

== Personal life ==
Goljan was born January 29, 1943, in Prospect Park, New York. He grew up in Uniondale on Long Island, where he lived until he was 18. He is of mixed Armenian and Polish ancestry—maternal heritage is Polish, and his father's family had moved from Armenia to southern Poland.

Goljan enjoys recreational arm wrestling, but had to quit this due to his history of amyotrophic lateral sclerosis. In addition, Edward Goljan is a Christian and states, in one of his pathology review lectures, that he was healed from amyotrophic lateral sclerosis after a minister prayed with him at the City of Faith Medical and Research Center.

== Education and awards ==
Goljan received his B.S. from St. Bonaventure University in 1964, and his M.D. from Temple University School of Medicine in 1968. He served his internship at Reading Hospital in Reading, PA from 1968–1969. He completed his residency in pathology at San Diego Naval Hospital between 1971 and 1973. He underwent further training as a pathology resident at Reading Hospital between 1974 and 1976. In 1976, he earned board certification in both Anatomical Pathology and Clinical Pathology.

Some of Goljan's honors and awards include:

- Golden Apple Award, Oral Roberts University School of Medicine (9 occasions)
- Basic Science Professor of the Year Award, OSU-COM (10 occasions)
- Recognition Award from the Christian Medical and Dental Society at OSU-COM
- Clinical Science Award, OSU-COM
- Distinguished Service Award in Pathology, Oklahoma State Osteopathic Society
- Provost Award at OSU-COM for excellence in teaching
- Gender Equity Award presented by the American Medical Women's Association at OSU-COM

== Notable publications ==
=== Primary author ===
- Goljan, E., Pathology, Rapid Review Series, Mosby, 2004
- Goljan, E.; Pelley, J. Biochemistry, Rapid Review Series, Mosby, 2003
- Goljan, E; Koro, P. MOST COMMONS IN: Surgery, W.B. Saunder's Company, 2001
- Goljan, E, P. MOST COMMONS IN: Medicine, W.B. Saunder's Company, 2000
- Goljan, E. MOST COMMONS IN: Pathology and Laboratory Medicine, W.B. Saunders Company, 1999
- Goljan, E. Pathology, W.B. Saunders Company, 1998
- Goljan, E. Pathology Review, W.B. Saunders Company, 1998
- Board Simulator Series: A Systems-Based Review for USMLE Step 1, Harwal Publishing Company, 1996
- Review for USMLE Step 2, Harwal Publishing Company, 1994—editor and contributor of Medicine, Surgery, Pediatrics questions

=== Series editor for the following Rapid Review series books ===
- Stevens, V.; Redwood, S.; et al.; Behavioral Science, Rapid Review Series 2004
- Moore, A; Roy, W.; Gross and Developmental Anatomy, Rapid Review Series 2003
- Pazdernik, T.; Kerecsen, L.; Mrugeshkumar, K.; Pharmacology, Rapid Review Series 2003
- Burns, E; Cave, M.; Histology and Cell Biology, Rapid Review Series 2002
- Rosenthal, K.; Tan, J.; Microbiology and Immunology, Rapid Review Series 2002
