= Mixed affective state =

Mental health condition

- Other names: Mixed affective state, mixed state, mixed episode, mixed-manic episode, dysphoric mania
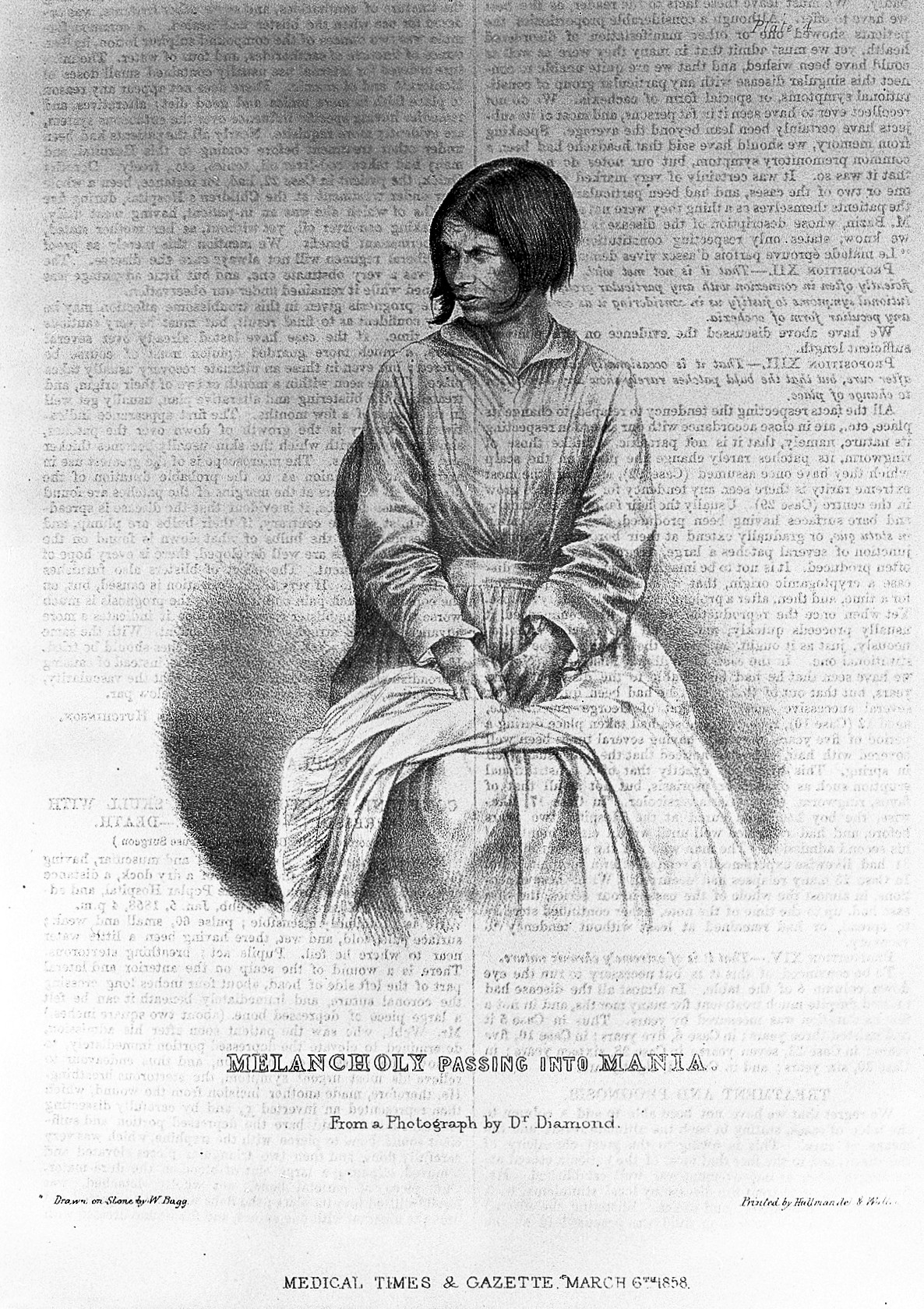
- "Melancholy passing into mania", illustration portraying the in-between state that those experiencing a mixed episode may feel
- Specialty: Psychiatry
- Symptoms: Depressed mood, racing thoughts, agitation, anxiety, irritability/aggression, emotional lability, suicidal ideation
- Risk factors: Bipolar disorder, cyclothymia, antidepressant use, highly recurrent depression
- Differential diagnosis: Anxiety, borderline personality disorder, ADHD
- Medication: Acute: antipsychotics Maintenance: antipsychotics, anticonvulsants, lithium

A mixed affective state, formerly known as a mixed state, mixed-manic episode, or mixed episode, has been defined as a state wherein features and symptoms unique to both depression and hypomania occur either simultaneously or in very short succession. This includes episodes of anguish, despair, diminished pleasure in enjoyed activities, feelings of guilt or self-loathing, excessive impulsivity and suicidal ideation, racing thoughts, heightened irritability, agitation or restlessness, increased goal-directed activity, increased talkativeness, or decreased need for sleep.

In Diagnostic and Statistical Manual of Mental Disorders, Fifth Edition nomenclature, a "mixed episode" no longer stands as an episode of illness unto itself; rather, the symptomology specifier "with mixed features" can be applied to any major affective episode (manic, hypomanic, or depressive), meaning that they are now officially also recognized in patients with bipolar II disorder and, by convention, major depressive disorder.

== Diagnosis ==
Previously, the diagnostic criteria for both a manic and depressive episode had to be met in a consistent and sustained fashion, with symptoms enduring for at least a week (or any duration if psychiatric hospitalization was required), thereby restricting the official acknowledgement of mixed affective states to only a minority of patients with bipolar I disorder.

As affirmed by the Diagnostic and Statistical Manual of Mental Disorders, fifth edition (DSM-5), the symptomology specifier "with mixed features" can be applied to manic episodes of bipolar I disorder, hypomanic episodes of either bipolar I disorder or bipolar II disorder and depressive episodes of either bipolar disorder or major depressive disorder, with at least three concurrent features of the opposite polarity being present. As a result, the presence of "mixed features" are now recognized in patients with bipolar II disorder and major depression; as earlier noted, however, although it is customary to withhold a diagnosis of a bipolar disorder until a manic or hypomanic episode appears, the presence of such features in a depressed patient even with no history of discrete mania or hypomania is strongly suggestive of the disorder. A depressive mixed state in a patient, even in the absence of discrete periods of mania or hypomania, effectively rules out unipolar depression.

Nevertheless, the DSM-5's narrower definition of mixed episodes may result in fewer patients meeting mixed criteria compared to DSM-IV. A call was made by Tohen in 2017 for introducing changes from a currently phenomenological to a target oriented approach to DSM-5 mixed mood criteria in order to achieve more personalized medical attention.

Two features of both mania or hypomania and depression may superficially overlap and even resemble each other, namely "an increase in goal-directed activity" (psychomotor acceleration) vs. psychomotor agitation and "flight of ideas" and "racing thoughts" vs. depressive rumination. Attending to the patient's experiences is very important. In the psychomotor agitation commonly seen in depression, the "nervous energy" is always overshadowed by a strong sense of exhaustion and manifests as purposeless movements (e.g., pacing, hand-wringing); in psychomotor acceleration, however, the excess in movement stems from an abundance of energy and is often channeled and purposeful. Likewise, in depressive rumination, the patient experiences the repetitive thoughts as heavy, leaden, and plodding; in psychic acceleration, however, (as seen in mania or hypomania) the thoughts move in a rapid progression with many themes being touched upon, rather than a singular one.

There may also be emotional lability, a usual consequence of hypomania and mania but usually not depression unless caused by borderline personality disorder or just emotional lability itself with or without any disorder. It can either be euphoric or dysphoric in nature. These episodes are extreme. Lability may be uncalled for in a depressive episode (if euphoric in nature) and it can present itself in four ways: anger, anxiety, happiness, and extreme excitement. People with emotional lability may seem to have suddenly developed anger issues or an anxiety disorder; they may seem to overreact in many or most situations; they may go from depressed to rapidly being "cured" or manic in just a few hours. Episodes of sudden mood change must be in a situation that promotes the feelings of anger, anxiety, and happiness or excitement. There also may be inappropriate and impulsive decision making, which can have severe, life changing, or even deadly consequences (like binge eating, excessive arguments, and an increased chance for suicide).

Irritability can also be present among mixed affective states. While irritability is present in all affective disorders, in depression it is often more subtle. In mixed episodes, the irritability is intense and easily noticed. Even when such experiences are accounted for on the basis of depression, the possibility does still exist, however, that the depressive episode may be complicated by other manic or hypomanic symptoms, in which case it is often prudent to attend to the patient's personal and family history (e.g., family history of bipolar disorder, early age of onset) to determine whether or not the patient has bipolar disorder.

== Treatment ==
Treatment of mixed states is typically based upon administration of mood stabilizing medication, which may include anticonvulsants such as valproic acid and lamotrigine; atypical antipsychotics such as quetiapine, olanzapine, aripiprazole, ziprasidone, and lurasidone; or first-generation antipsychotics such as haloperidol. There is question of lithium's efficacy for treatment of mixed states due to conflicting conclusions drawn from various trials and research. Mood stabilizers work to reduce the manic symptoms associated with the mixed state, but they are not considered particularly effective for improving concurrent depressive symptoms.

== History ==
In ancient Greece, Hippocrates and Aretaeus of Cappadocia were the first to describe manic-depressive illness, including mixed states.

In the 19th century, Johann Christian August Heinroth was the first to describe mixed states in the modern era. He called combinations of exaltation and weakness 'hypo-asthenias.' In his seminal textbook, Kraepelin postulated that most mood episodes were mixed in manic-depressive illness (bipolar disorder). According the Kraepelin, pure manias or pure depressions were not as frequent as mixed states. In 1899, Weygant published the first book on mixed states, "On the Mixed States of Manic-Depressive Insanity." In his book he introduced the term 'agitated depression.' Athanasios Koukopoulos followed up on this term in his 1999 article, "Agitated Depression as a Mixed State and the Problem of Melancholia."

In 1980, the DSM-III followed the school of the 19th and 20th century psychiatrists, Wernicke, Kleist, and Leonhard by separating unipolar and bipolar mood disorders. Although Leonhard described mixed states as a potential symptom of bipolar disorder, the DSM-III version of bipolar disorder placed less emphasis on mixed states. In 2013, the DSM-5 reintroduced a mixed features specifier to major depressive disorder.

== See also ==
- Bipolar disorder
- Major depressive disorder
