= Reading Hospital =

Coordinates: 40.330315°N 75.950553°W

- Tower Health

Geography
- Location: 420 South 5th Avenue, West Reading, Pennsylvania, United States

Organization
- Type: Teaching
- Affiliated university: Drexel University College of Medicine, Alvernia University, Duke University, Jefferson Medical College of Thomas Jefferson University, McMasters University, Penn State Hershey College of Medicine, Philadelphia College of Osteopathic Medicine, Temple University School of Medicine, University of Michigan, University of Pennsylvania Health System, Washington University Medical Center

Services
- Emergency department: Level I Trauma Center
- Beds: 697

Helipads
- Helipad: FAA LID: 9PS5
| Number | Length | | Surface |
| Number | ft | m | Surface |
|---|---|---|---|
| H1 | 42 | 13 | Mats |

History
- Founded: 1867

Links
- Website: Reading Hospital
- Lists: Hospitals in Pennsylvania

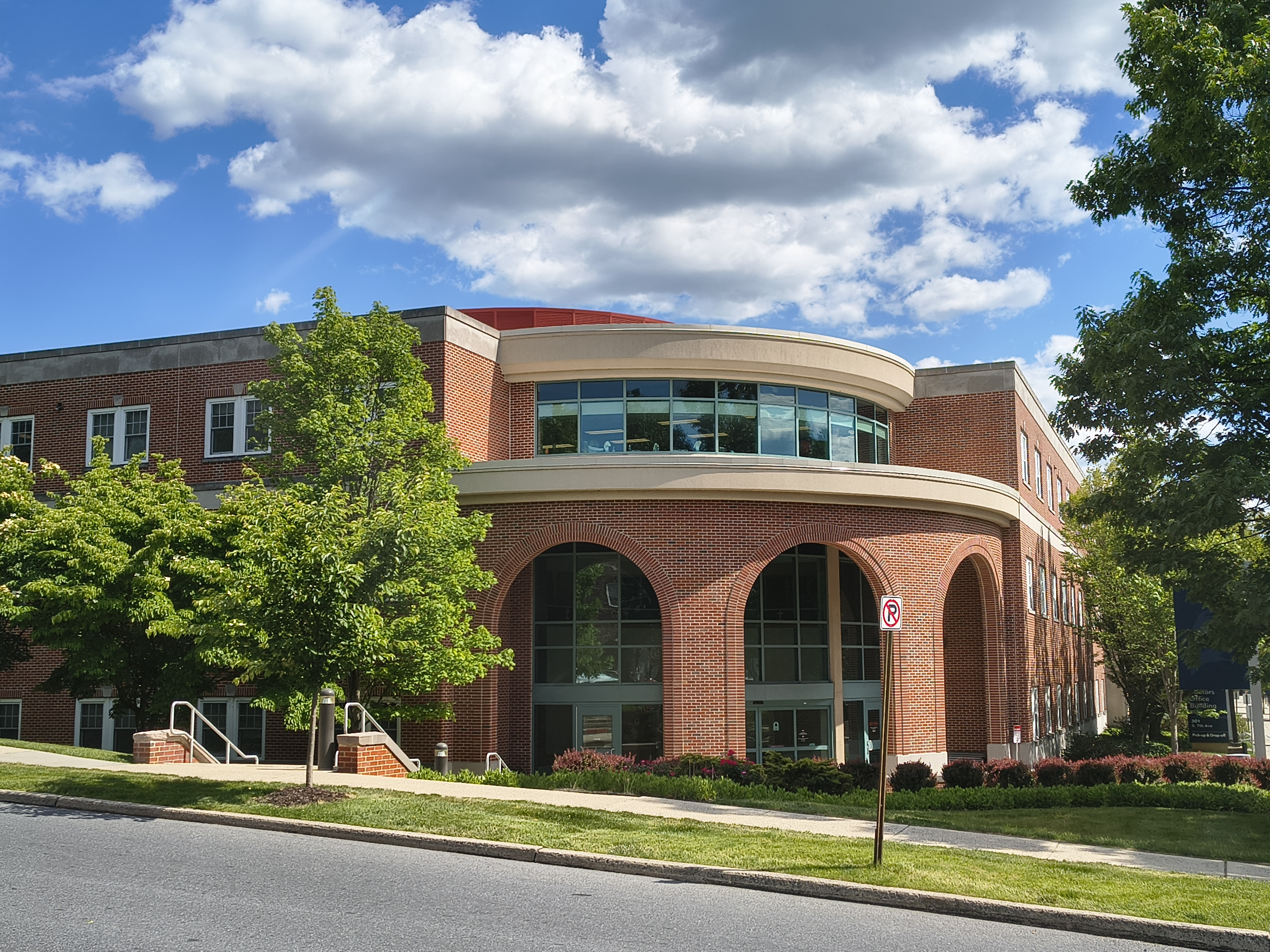
Photo of the Northwest wing of the Reading Hospital

Reading Hospital is a 697-bed non-profit teaching hospital located in West Reading, Pennsylvania. The hospital was established in 1867 and is the anchor institution of Tower Health.

Reading Hospital is a level I trauma center and certified stroke center. With more than 133,500 annual visits, the emergency department is the single busiest site in Pennsylvania and the 11th busiest nationwide. The hospital operates several residency training programs for newly graduated physicians such as internal medicine, internal medicine osteopathic, transitional year, family medicine, OB/GYN, emergency medicine, anesthesiology, general surgery, neurology, podiatric surgery & psychiatry. One year pharmacy residency is also offered. The residency programs are accredited by the Accreditation Council for Graduate Medical Education. The internal medicine residency is also accredited by the American Osteopathic Association.

== History ==
In November 1867, physicians with the Reading Medical Association and 16 local business leaders developed plans for the area's first hospital. The Reading Dispensary opened in downtown Reading on Jan. 27, 1868, and moved to northwest Reading in 1886 under its new name, The Reading Hospital. Public demand for hospital care led to constant expansion, resulting in the 1926 relocation to the present 36-acre (15-hectare) site in West Reading.

In 2017, Reading hospital introduced Tower Health. This included a purchase of Brandywine Hospital in Coatesville; Chestnut Hill Hospital, in Philadelphia; Jennersville Hospital in West Grove; Phoenixville Hospital in Phoenixville; and Pottstown Hospital in Pottstown; St. Christopher's Hospital for Children in Philadelphia; and 20 urgent care locations across the service area. In 2019, a 16-bed pediatric emergency department was added.

In 2017, Reading Hospital treated more than 133,000 people in its emergency room, delivered 3,500 babies, provided more than 750,000 outpatient services and 33,000 inpatient admissions. Reading Hospital operates a level I trauma center. The hospital is certified as an advanced comprehensive stroke center.

The campus is a principal teaching site for Drexel University College of Medicine. In 2021, Drexel opened a new 4-year medical campus in West Reading. Students at the Drexel College of Medicine at Tower Health have the opportunity to complete all 4 years of the MD program at Reading Hospital.

== Awards and recognition ==
- From 2022 to 2025, Healthgrades designated Reading Hospital as one of America's 50 Best Hospitals. Reading was also named one of America's 100 best for stroke care and joint replacement. Individual areas recognized within the top 10% include cardiac surgery, neurosciences, joint replacement, overall pulmonary treatment, and GI medical treatment. It is within the top 5% for treatment of stroke.
- U.S. News & World Report recognized Reading Hospital as a 2022-2023 best hospital, and ranked #8 in Pennsylvania. Reading was high performing in 5 specialties including gastroenterology, geriatrics, orthopedics, pulmonary and lung surgery, and urology. The hospital also received high performing marks in COPD, colon cancer surgery, diabetes, heart attack, heart failure, hip replacement, kidney failure, knee replacement, pneumonia, and stroke.
- Since 2016, Reading Hospital has received the prestigious MAGNET designation for nursing excellence by the American Nurses Credentialing Center (ANCC).

== Graduate medical education ==
Reading Hospital operates a number of residency training programs for newly graduated physicians. Programs include Emergency Medicine, Family Medicine, Internal Medicine, OB/GYN, Podiatric Medicine and Surgery, Psychiatry, and a Transitional Year. All programs are accredited by the Accreditation Council for Graduate Medical Education (ACGME). The internal medicine program is also dually accredited by the American Osteopathic Association. There is also a residency programs for pharmacists. In January 2021, Tower Health announced additional residency programs in neurology and physical medicine and rehabilitation, as well as fellowship programs in nephrology, plastic surgery, sleep medicine, and pulmonary disease and critical care medicine.

== Accreditation ==
- Magnet Recognition
- Commission on Accreditation of Rehabilitation Facilities Accreditation
- Commission on Cancer Accreditation and Gold Rating
- Joint Commission's Gold Seal of Approval
- Joint Commission Disease-Specific Certification
- Quality Oncology Practice Initiative Certification
- Certified Urgent Care Center Category 1 Designation by the Urgent Care Association of America
- The Society of Cardiovascular Patient Care Chest Pain Center
- Undersea and Hyperbaric Medicine Society Full Accreditation
- Commission on Cancer of the American College of Surgeons Approval with Commendation
- American Association of Blood Banks Accreditation

== Affiliations ==
- Academic Centers
  - Alvernia University
  - Drexel University College of Medicine
  - Duke University
  - Jefferson Medical College of Thomas Jefferson University
  - The Johns Hopkins Clinical Research Network
  - McMasters University
  - Penn State Hershey College of Medicine
  - Philadelphia College of Osteopathic Medicine
  - Temple University School of Medicine
  - University of Michigan
  - University of Pennsylvania Health System
  - Washington University Medical Center
- Medical Research Institutes
  - National Heart, Lung and Blood Institute
  - National Institute of Allergy and Infectious Disease
  - National Neurological Disorders and Stroke
  - Saint Jude Medical

== Notable people ==
- Edward Goljan, MD – a physician and professor of medicine at Oklahoma State University, completed his internship and residency in pathology at Reading Hospital.
- Taylor Swift, international popstar was born here in 1989.
- Austin Kingsley Swift, actor was born here in 1992.
- John Fetterman, politician was born here in 1969
