= Racing thoughts =

Mental process

Racing thoughts refers to the rapid thought patterns that often occur in manic, hypomanic, or mixed episodes. While racing thoughts are most commonly described in people with bipolar disorder and sleep apnea, they are also common with anxiety disorders, obsessive–compulsive disorder (OCD), and other psychiatric disorders such as attention deficit hyperactivity disorder (ADHD). Racing thoughts are also associated with sleep deprivation, hyperthyroidism, and the use of amphetamines.

== Description ==
Racing thoughts may be experienced as background, or may take over a person's consciousness. Thoughts, music, and voices might be zooming through one's mind as they jump tangentially from one to the next. There also might be a repetitive pattern of voice or of pressure without any associated "sound". It is a very overwhelming and irritating feeling, and can result in losing track of time. In some cases, it may also be frightening to the person experiencing it, as there is a loss of control. If one is experiencing these thoughts at night when going to sleep, they may suddenly awaken, startled and confused by the very random and sudden nature of the thoughts.

Racing thoughts differ in manifestation according to the individual's perspective. These manifestations can vary from unnoticed or minor distractions to debilitating stress, preventing the sufferer from maintaining a thought.

Generally, racing thoughts are described by an individual who has had an episode where the mind uncontrollably brings up random thoughts and memories and switches between them very quickly. Sometimes they are related, as one thought leads to another; other times they seem completely random. A person suffering from an episode of racing thoughts has no control over their train of thought, and it stops them from focusing on one topic or prevents sleeping.

== Associated conditions ==
The causes of racing thoughts are most often associated with anxiety disorders, but many influences can cause these rapid, racing thoughts. There are also many associated conditions, in addition to anxiety disorders, which can be classified as having secondary relationships with causing racing thoughts. The conditions most commonly linked to racing thoughts are bipolar disorder, anxiety disorders, attention deficit hyperactivity disorder, sleep deprivation, amphetamine dependence, and hyperthyroidism.

=== Anxiety disorders ===
Racing thoughts associated with anxiety disorders can be caused by many different conditions, such as obsessive–compulsive disorder (OCD), panic disorder, generalized anxiety disorder, or posttraumatic stress disorder.

In people with OCD, racing thoughts can be brought on by stressors, or triggers, causing disturbing thoughts in the individual. These disturbing thoughts, then, result in compulsions characterizing OCD in order to lower the stress and gain some sort of control over these stressful, racing thoughts.

Panic disorder is an anxiety disorder characterized by repeated panic attacks of fear or nervousness, lasting several minutes. During these panic attacks, the response is out of proportion to the situation. The racing thoughts may feel catastrophic and intense, but they are a symptom of the panic attack and must be controlled in order to soothe the panic and minimize the panic attack.

Generalized anxiety disorder is a neurological anxiety disorder that involves uncontrollable and excessive worrying about irrational topics or problems. These stressful thoughts must be present for at least six months in order to be diagnosed as GAD. Along with other symptoms, racing thoughts is one of the most common ones. With GAD, there is an inability to relax or let thoughts or worries go, persistent worrying and obsessions about small concerns that are out of proportion to the result, and even worrying about their excessive worrying.

=== Bipolar disorder ===
Racing thoughts can be brought on by bipolar disorder, defined by mood instability that range from extreme emotional highs, mania, to severe depression. Racing thoughts usually occur during the manic phase of bipolar disorder. Disjointed, constantly changing thoughts with no underlying theme can be a sign of the manic phase of bipolar disorder. Manic thoughts can prevent performance of daily routines due to their rapid, unfocused and overwhelming nature. Racing thoughts in people with bipolar disorder are generally accompanied with other symptoms associated with this disorder.

=== Amphetamines ===
Amphetamines are used as a stimulant to trigger the central nervous system, increasing heart rate and blood pressure while decreasing appetite. Since amphetamines are a stimulant, use of these drugs result in a state that resembles the manic phase of bipolar disorder and also produces similar symptoms, as stated above.

=== Attention deficit hyperactivity disorder ===
Racing thoughts associated with ADHD is most common in adults. With ADHD, racing thoughts can occur and tend to cause insomnia. Racing thoughts in people with ADHD tend to be rapid, unstable thoughts which do not follow any sort of pattern, similar to racing thoughts in people with bipolar disorder. Medications used to treat ADHD, such as Adderall or Methylphenidate, can be prescribed to patients with ADHD to calm these racing thoughts, most commonly in the morning when people wake up but just as well in the evening before sleep.

=== Lack of sleep ===
Racing thoughts, also referred to as "racing mind", may prevent a person from falling asleep. Chronic sleep apnea and prolonged disturbed sleep patterns may also induce racing thoughts. Treatment for sleep apnea and obstructive airway disorder can improve airflow and improve sleep resulting in improved brain and REM function and reduced racing thought patterns.

=== Hyperthyroidism ===
Hyperthyroidism is a condition in which the thyroid gland produces too much thyroid hormone, thyroxine. This overabundance of thyroxine causes irregular and rapid heartbeat, irritability, weight loss, nervousness, anxiety and racing thoughts. The anxiety and inability to focus is very common in hyperthyroidism and leads to racing thoughts, as well as panic attacks and difficulty concentrating.

== Frequency ==
Anxiety disorder, the most common mental illness in the United States, affects 40 million people, ages 10 and older; this accounts for 18% of the U.S. population. Most people suffering from anxiety disorder report some form of racing thoughts symptom.

The prevalence of OCD in every culture studied is at least 2% of the population, and the majority of those have obsessions, or racing thoughts. With these reportings, estimates of more than 2 million people in the United States (as of 2000) suffer from racing thoughts.

== See also ==
- Flight of ideas
- Intrusive thoughts
- Pressure of speech
- Sleep apnea
- Tachypsychia
- Impulse control disorder
- Mixed affective state
- Mood swing
