= West Reading, Pennsylvania =

Borough in Pennsylvania, US

- Borough
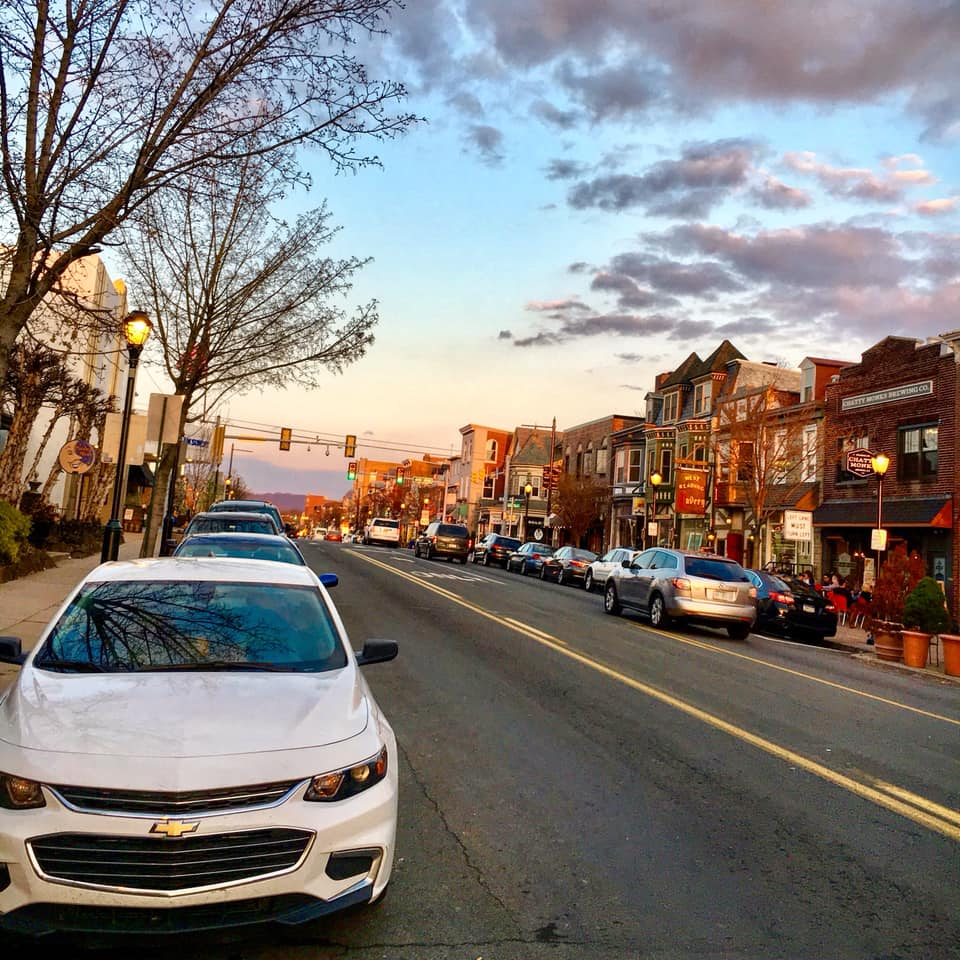
- Penn Avenue

- Flag Seal

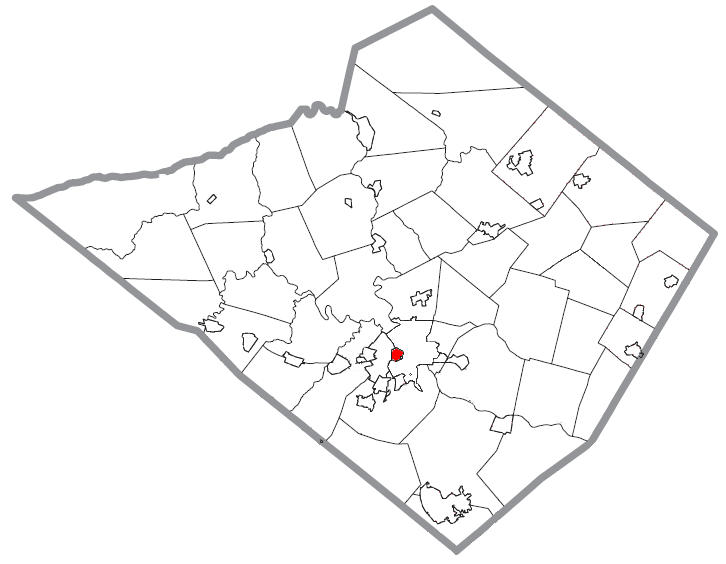
- Location in Berks County, Pennsylvania

- Location in Pennsylvania Location in the United States
- Coordinates: 40°20′03″N 75°56′48″W
- Country: United States
- State: Pennsylvania
- County: Berks
- Incorporated: March 18, 1907

Government
  - Type: Mayor–council
  - Mayor: Samantha Kaag (D)

Area
  - Total: 0.60 sq mi (1.55 km^{2})
  - Land: 0.59 sq mi (1.54 km^{2})
  - Water: 0.0039 sq mi (0.01 km^{2})
- Elevation: 285 ft (87 m)

Population (2020)
  - Total: 4,553
  - Density: 7,660.4/sq mi (2,957.71/km^{2})
- Time zone: UTC-5 (EST)
  - Summer (DST): UTC-4 (EDT)
- ZIP Code: 19611
- Area codes: 610 and 484
- FIPS code: 42-83928
- Website: westreadingborough.com

West Reading is a borough in Berks County, Pennsylvania, United States, located next to the city of Reading. The population was 4,553 at the 2020 census. It contains a vibrant main street (Penn Avenue) and the large Reading Hospital and Medical Center. It was also the site of the VF Outlet Village, one of the largest outlet malls in the United States. The VF Outlet Village was located in the buildings of the former Berkshire Knitting Mills, which was in operation from 1908 to 1975. The VF Outlet closed in 2020.

== History ==
The Lenape tribe occupied the area.

The borough was settled in 1873 and incorporated on March 18, 1907. It celebrated its 100th anniversary in 2007.

In 2022, Samantha Kaag, West Reading’s first ever female Mayor, was elected and took office.

In 2023, seven people were killed in the 2023 Pennsylvania chocolate factory explosion.

== Geography ==
According to the U.S. Census Bureau, the borough has a total area of 0.6 square miles (1.6 km^{2}), all land. West Reading is located west of the Schuylkill River, and north of the Wyomissing Creek. It is settled on a hilly region, as usual for towns in the Piedmont (plateau). The previously mentioned Penn Avenue interchanges with U.S. Route 422 going eastbound, along bordering two directions railways to the north and east. It borders Reading, PA to the south and east, and Wyomissing, PA to the north and east.

== Demographics ==
Historical population
Census	Pop.	Note	%±
1880	170		—
1910	2,064		—
1920	2,921		41.5%
1930	4,908		68.0%
1940	4,907		0.0%
1950	5,072		3.4%
1960	4,938		−2.6%
1970	4,578		−7.3%
1980	4,507		−1.6%
1990	4,142		−8.1%
2000	4,049		−2.2%
2010	4,212		4.0%
2020	4,553		8.1%
U.S. Decennial Census

=== 2020 census ===
As of the 2020 census, West Reading had a population of 4,553. The median age was 36.9 years. 21.7% of residents were under the age of 18 and 17.5% of residents were 65 years of age or older. For every 100 females there were 96.1 males, and for every 100 females age 18 and over there were 96.0 males age 18 and over.

100.0% of residents lived in urban areas, while 0.0% lived in rural areas.

Racial composition as of the 2020 census
Race	Number	Percent
White	2,962	65.1%
Black or African American	381	8.4%
American Indian and Alaska Native	4	0.1%
Asian	97	2.1%
Native Hawaiian and Other Pacific Islander	0	0.0%
Some other race	472	10.4%
Two or more races	637	14.0%
Hispanic or Latino (of any race)	1,181	25.9%

There were 1,815 households in West Reading, of which 30.0% had children under the age of 18 living in them. Of all households, 27.9% were married-couple households, 25.2% were households with a male householder and no spouse or partner present, and 34.5% were households with a female householder and no spouse or partner present. About 35.4% of all households were made up of individuals and 10.1% had someone living alone who was 65 years of age or older.

There were 1,925 housing units, of which 5.7% were vacant. The homeowner vacancy rate was 0.6% and the rental vacancy rate was 4.9%.

=== 2000 census ===
As of the 2000 census, there were 4,049 people, 1,666 households, and 862 families residing in the borough. The population density was 7,079.6 inhabitants per square mile (2,733.4/km^{2}). There were 1,783 housing units at an average density of 3,117.5 per square mile (1,203.7/km^{2}). The racial makeup of the borough was 89.33% White, 4.03% African American, 0.22% Native American, 1.53% Asian, 0.02% Pacific Islander, 3.41% from other races, and 1.46% from two or more races. Hispanic or Latino of any race were 7.78% of the population.

There were 1,666 households, out of which 23.6% had children under the age of 18 living with them, 36.0% were married couples living together, 11.9% had a female householder with no husband present, and 48.2% were non-families. 39.4% of all households were made up of individuals, and 14.3% had someone living alone who was 65 years of age or older. The average household size was 2.11 and the average family size was 2.84.

In the borough, the population was spread out, with 18.7% under the age of 18, 8.2% from 18 to 24, 28.8% from 25 to 44, 18.0% from 45 to 64, and 26.3% who were 65 years of age or older. The median age was 40 years. For every 100 females, there were 82.6 males. For every 100 females aged 18 and over, there were 78.8 males.

The median income for a household in the borough was $38,340, and the median income for a family was $43,472. Males had a median income of $31,592 versus $25,411 for females. The per capita income for the borough was $21,414. About 5.8% of families and 9.5% of the population were below the poverty line, including 16.0% of those under age 18 and 3.6% of those aged 65 or over.

== Economy ==
The Reading Hospital and Medical Center is the largest employer in the borough and one of the top five employers in Berks County. The parent company, Tower Health, has its headquarters in the borough.

== Government ==
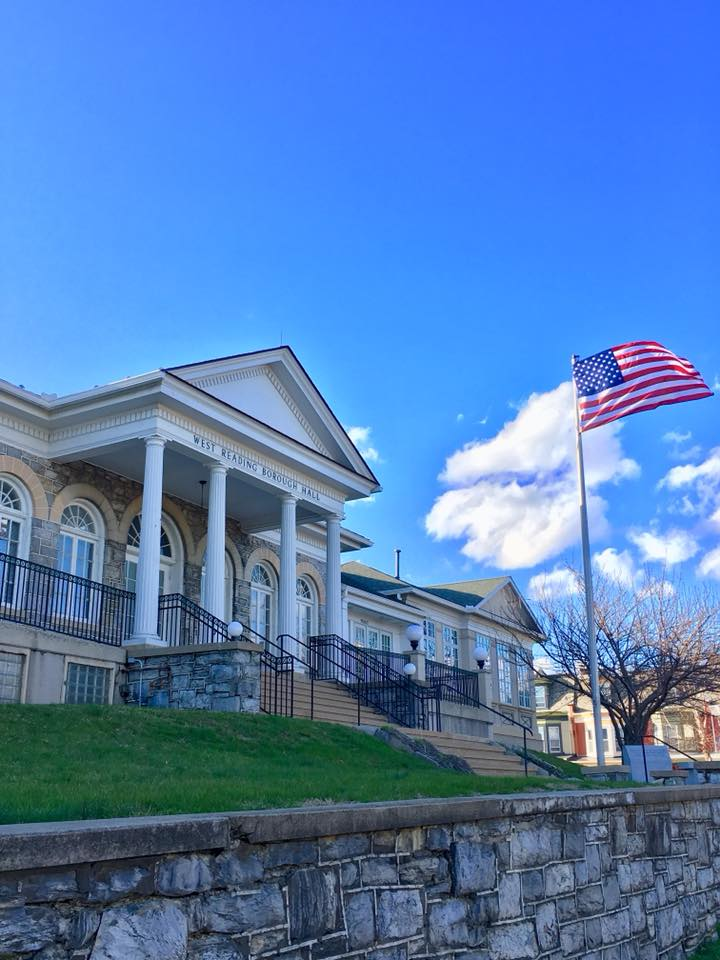
West Reading Borough Hall

A council-manager form of government governs the Borough of West Reading. The council's president is Ryan Lineaweaver, and the Vice President is Phillip Wert. The five other members are as follows: Christopher Lincoln, Patrick Kaag, Jennifer Bressler, Denise Drobnick, and Zachary Shaver. Each council member is elected to four and two-year terms, which are on a rotating cycle. The Mayor of the Borough is Samantha Kaag. Her primary role is public safety, oversight of the police department, community involvement, and working hand-in-hand with the borough council. The Magisterial District Judge of West Reading (and Wyomissing) is Eric J. Taylor.

== Notable people ==
- John Fetterman (b. 1969), U.S. senator for Pennsylvania, lieutenant governor of Pennsylvania, and mayor of Braddock
- Al Gursky (b. 1940), former professional football player, New York Giants
- Chad Henne, (b. 1985), former professional football player, Jacksonville Jaguars, Kansas City Chiefs, and the Miami Dolphins
- Michael W. Kirst (b. 1939), former president, California State Board of Education
- Andrew H. Knoll, (b. 1951), natural history professor, Harvard University
- Lori and George Schappell (1961–2024), conjoined twins
- Austin Swift, (b. 1992), actor, producer, and businessman
- Taylor Swift, (b. 1989), singer-songwriter

== Transportation ==
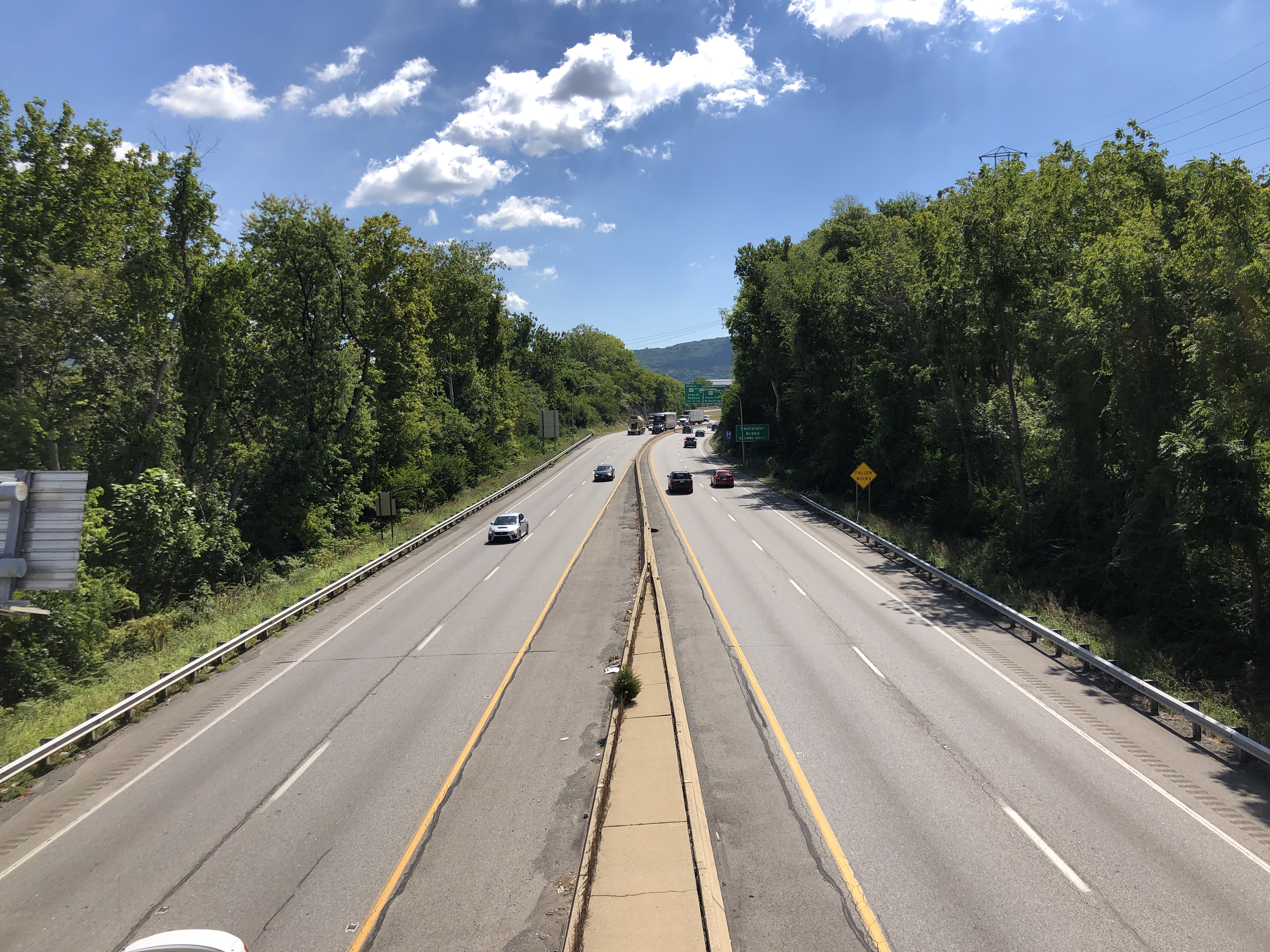
U.S. Route 422 eastbound in West Reading

As of 2020, there were 12.92 miles (20.79 km) of public roads in West Reading, of which 1.84 miles (2.96 km) were maintained by the Pennsylvania Department of Transportation (PennDOT) and 11.08 miles (17.83 km) were maintained by the borough.

U.S. Route 422 is the main highway serving West Reading. It follows the West Shore Bypass along a northwest-to-southeast alignment across the northeastern portion of the borough. U.S. Route 422 Business follows the old alignment of US 422 along Penn Avenue through the center of the borough.
