= Birdsboro station =

Birdsboro station could refer to three former railway stations in Birdsboro, Pennsylvania:

- Birdsboro station (Pennsylvania Railroad), the former Pennsylvania Railroad station on the Schuylkill Branch
- Birdsboro station (Reading Railroad), the former stations on the Main Line and the Wilmington and Northern Branch
