= Lucile Carter =

American Titanic survivor (1875–1934)

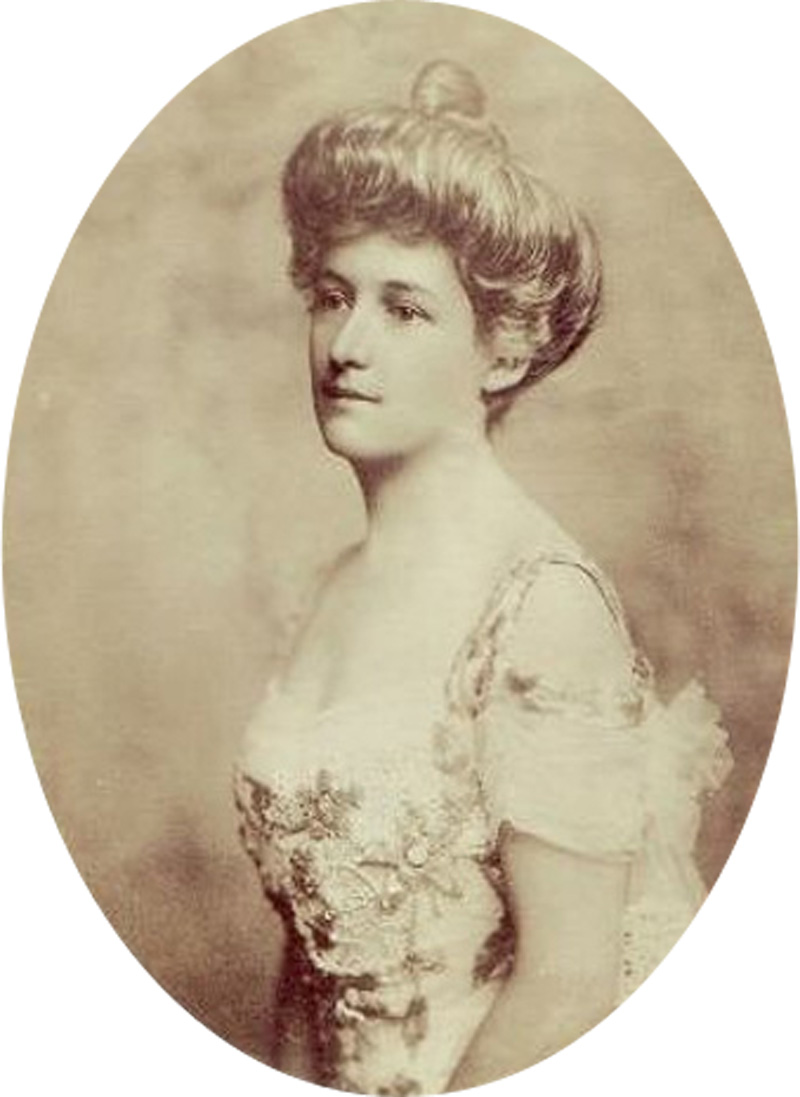
- Lucile Carter circa 1900
- Born: Lucile Stewart Polk; October 8, 1875; Baltimore, Maryland, US
- Died: October 26, 1934 (aged 59); Ithan, Pennsylvania, US
- Resting place: St. Michael's Cemetery, Birdsboro, Pennsylvania
- Spouses: William Ernest Carter (m. 1896; div. 1914) George Brooke Jr. (m. 1914)
- Children: 3

Lucile Stewart Brooke (née Polk, formerly Carter; October 8, 1875 – October 26, 1934) was an American socialite. Her first husband was William E. Carter, a wealthy American who inherited a fortune from his father. The couple and their two children survived the RMS Titanic disaster after the ship struck an iceberg and sank on April 15, 1912. Soon after the tragedy, their marriage fell apart, with Lucile accusing her husband of abandoning her and their children during the sinking, and of "cruel and barbarous treatment."

== Early life ==
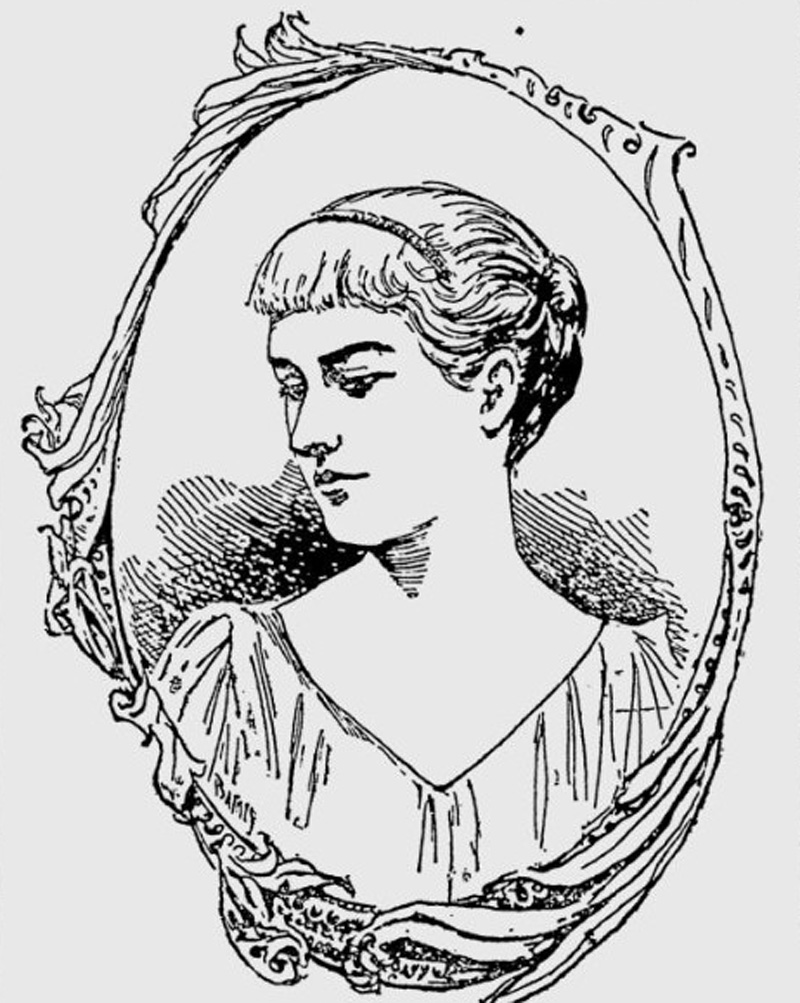
Sketch of Lucile Stewart Polk in the social pages of a Baltimore newspaper in 1892 when she was aged 17.

Lucile Stewart Polk was born in 1875 in Baltimore, Maryland. Her father was William Stewart Polk (1828–1917) and her mother was Louisa Ellen (née Anderson). Carter's father was a partner in the very successful insurance brokerage firm Hopper Polk and Purnell of Baltimore and was fairly wealthy. Many of the newspaper reports noted that he was a descendant of President James K. Polk.

Before her marriage, Carter was mentioned often in the social pages of the Baltimore newspapers. The picture on the left is a sketch of her in the newspaper Baltimore American in 1892 when she was aged 17.

== Marriage ==
On January 29, 1896, she married William Ernest Carter. He was the son of William Thornton Carter (1827–1893) who had made a vast fortune in the coal industry and was said to be "one of the most extensive and successful coal operators in America". Carter's husband inherited much of this fortune and the couple led a very privileged lifestyle. They had two children, Lucile Polk Carter born in 1897 and William Thornton Carter II born in 1900, who were also passengers on the Titanic and survived.

After their marriage, the couple was frequently mentioned in the social pages. Lucile was often noted for her striking clothes. The following is an extract from one of the newspapers.

Mrs William E Carter of Philadelphia, a beauty of pronounced type, has been startling Newport with flaming costumes. In an accordion plaited Eton suit of red and with a red hat, a red parasol, red slippers and silk stockings of the same shade her Dresden china colouring seems even lovelier than when she wears less striking costumes.

Carter was also very athletic and quite daring. One newspaper commented that "she was the first woman to play polo riding astride and the first woman to drive a four-in-hand (which is a carriage with four horses) through crowded Thames Street in Baltimore.

In about 1907, the Carter family went to live in Europe. They annually returned to the United States and lived in their mansion in Bryn Mawr during the summer with visits to Newport. It was on one of those return trips that they booked their passage on the RMS Titanic.

== On board the Titanic ==
The Carters boarded the Titanic at Southampton. Accompanying the couple were their two children, Lucile Carter's maid Auguste Serepeca, William Carter's manservant Alexander Cairns, and the chauffeur Charles Aldworth. On the voyage, William Carter brought on board his 25 horsepower Renault Towncar. They occupied First Class Cabins B96/98.

The original story told in the press regarding the Carter family’s experience of their ordeal was that William Carter came to the cabin and escorted his family to lifeboat 4. He then left this area with the other men who had taken their wives to this boat. These men were John Astor, George Widener and John Thayer. William Carter escaped from the Titanic on collapsible lifeboat C (along with Bruce Ismay) but the other three men were lost on the liner.

Carter gave details of what happened when she and her two children boarded Lifeboat 4. Her statement was as follows.

When I went over the side with my children and got in the boat there were no seamen in it. Then came a few men, but there were oars with no one to use them. The boat had been filled with passengers, and there was nothing else for me to do but to take an oar. We could see now that the time of the ship had come. She was sinking, and we were warned by cries from the men above to pull away from the ship quickly. Mrs. Thayer, wife of the vice-president of the Pennsylvania Railroad, was in my boat, and she, too, took an oar. It was cold and we had no time to clothe ourselves with warm overcoats. The rowing warmed me. We started to pull away from the ship. We could see the dim outlines of the decks above, but we could not recognize anybody.

== Later years ==
Following their rescue by the RMS Carpathia, the family returned to "Gwenda", their mansion in Bryn Mawr, Pennsylvania. Less than two years later, in January 1914, Carter filed for divorce. The divorce was granted on May 30, although no details were made public at the time. The following year it was sensationally revealed by the newspapers that the grounds for the divorce had been "cruel and barbarous treatment." Carter's sworn statement revealed that William Carter had not accompanied her and the children to Lifeboat 4 to ensure their safety:

We sailed for America on the Titanic. When the Titanic struck my husband came to our stateroom and said: 'Get up and dress yourself and the children'. I never saw him again until I arrived at the Carpathia at 8 o'clock the next morning, when I saw him leaning on the rail. All he said was that he had had a jolly good breakfast and that he never thought I would make it.

=== Second marriage ===
At a Philadelphia dinner party given by Mr. & Mrs. Edward Brooke, Carter met the host's brother, George Brooke Jr., a wealthy banker and steel manufacturer, and a bachelor in his mid-40s.

With her divorce finalized, Carter and her daughter departed for Europe in June 1914, intending to stay for a year. Edward Brooke, his wife and four children also spent that summer in Europe; brother George was to join them in August. When World War I broke out at the end of July, Carter and her daughter were caught in Paris. George Brooke arrived in London and tried to get to Paris, but wartime travel restrictions made it impossible. Instead, he arranged passage for Carter and her daughter to England. Rather than waiting until they returned to the United States, the couple married in London on August 16, 1914, with Brooke's brother and family and Carter's daughter in attendance. The whole group sailed almost immediately back to the United States on board the Olympic, the sister ship of the Titanic.

For the first two years of their marriage, the couple divided their time between a city house in Philadelphia; a country house in Birdsboro, Pennsylvania, "Brookewood", that Brooke had inherited from his late parents; and a rented summer cottage in Newport, Rhode Island. In fall 1916, they rented a Radnor, Pennsylvania, mansion, "Rock Rose". Carter's daughter Lucile made her Philadelphia society debut while they were living at "Rock Rose", but their stay was marred by a December 12 fire. The following December, the Brookes gathered in Birdsboro to celebrate Christmas. In the early hours of Christmas Day 1917, Brooke, Carter and the children were roused from their beds by a fire that destroyed "Brookewood". The couple bought a country house outside Birdsboro, "Clingan", that had belonged to a Brooke cousin; and "Isle Field" in Ithan, Pennsylvania, on Philadelphia's Main Line, which they renamed "Almondbury House".

The Brookes had one child together, a daughter named Elizabeth Muhlenberg Brooke, born April 14, 1916. Later known as Elizabeth "Betty" Brooke Blake (The first wife of Tommy Phipps younger brother of Joyce Grenfell), she was living in Dallas, Texas, as of April 2012, and died in Newport, Rhode Island, on August 8, 2016.

== Death ==
Carter died of a heart attack on October 26, 1934, at Almondbury House. George Brooke sold the mansion and moved to an apartment in Haverford, Pennsylvania. He died twenty-nine years later. They are buried together in St. Michael's Cemetery in Birdsboro.

== Gallery ==
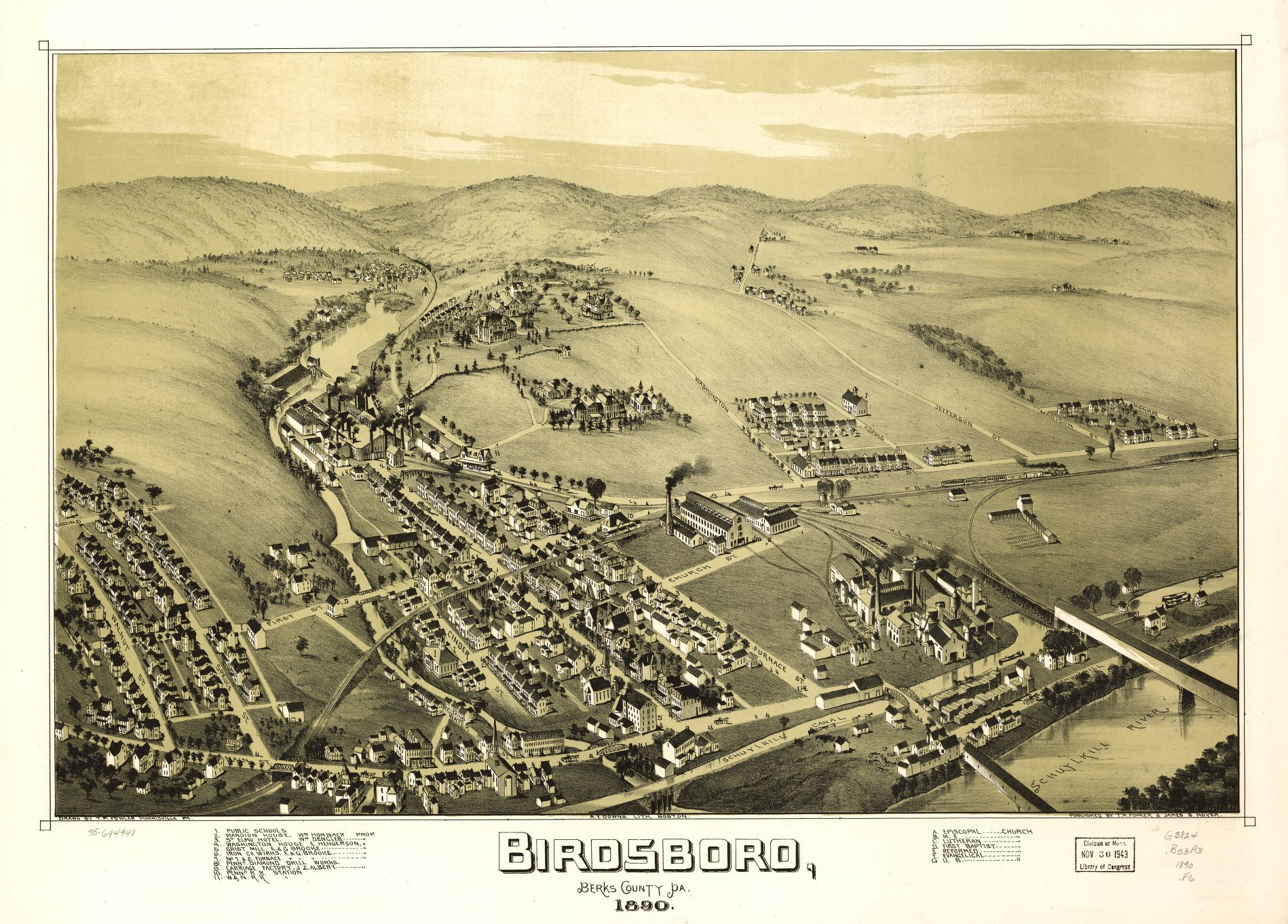
Birdsboro, in 1890.

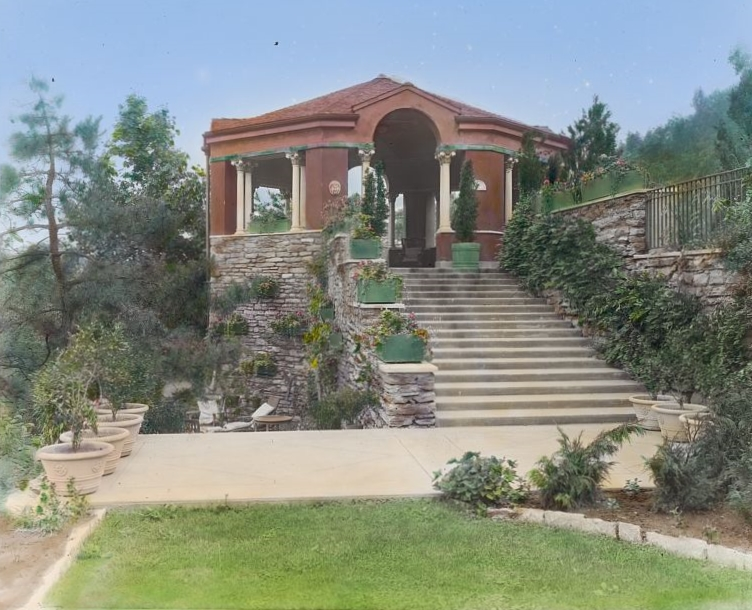
Garden pavilion at "Rock Rose," Radnor, Pennsylvania, Zantzinger, Borie and Medary, architects.

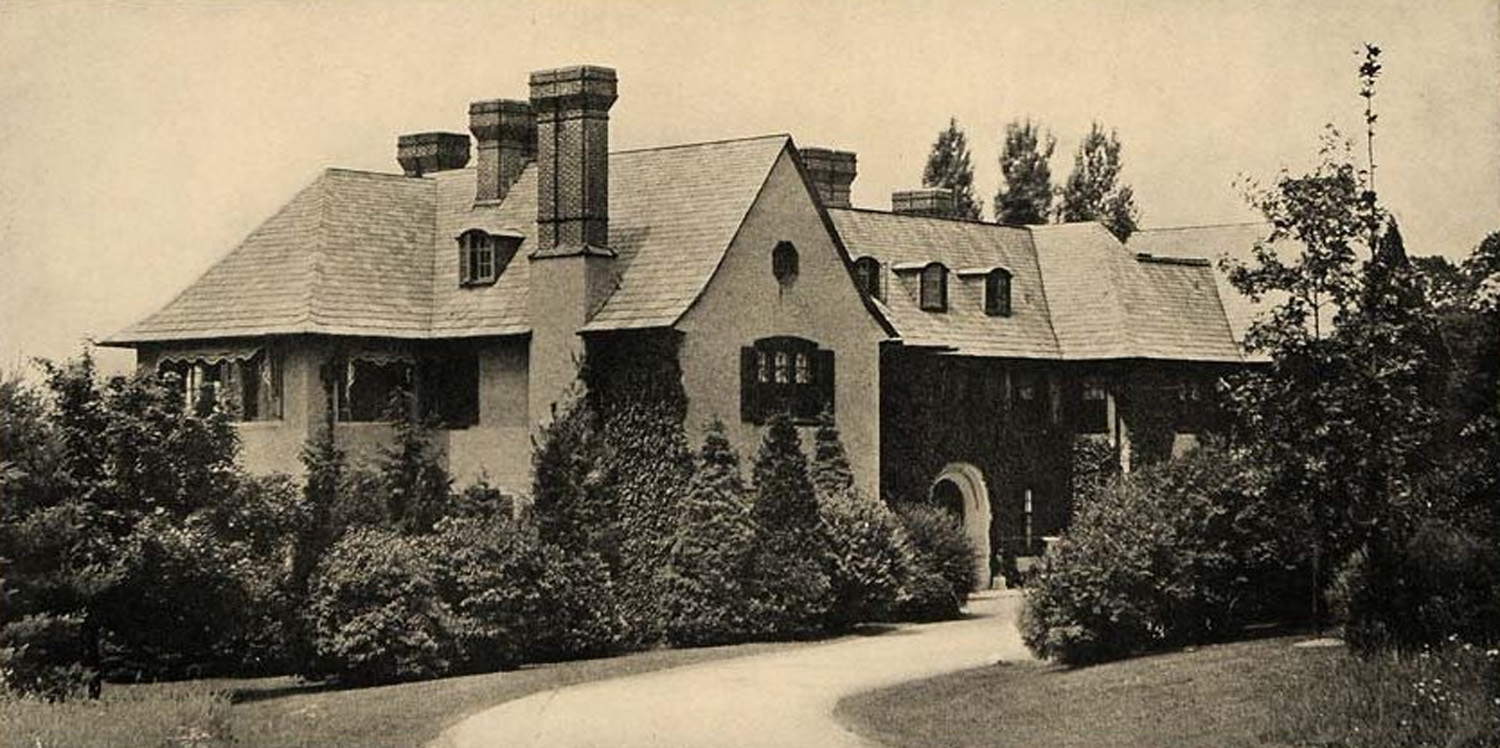
"Almonbury House" (originally "Isle Field"), Ithan, Pennsylvania, Horace Trumbauer, architect.

== See also ==
- Passengers of the RMS Titanic
