= Randy Gumpert =

American baseball player (1918–2008)

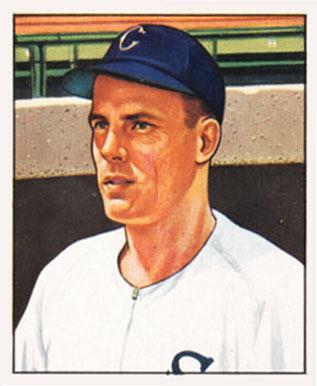
- Pitcher
- Born: January 23, 1918; Monocacy Station, Pennsylvania, U.S.
- Died: November 25, 2008 (aged 90); Wyomissing, Pennsylvania, U.S.
- Batted: Right Threw: Right

MLB debut
- June 13, 1936, for the Philadelphia Athletics

Last MLB appearance
- September 23, 1952, for the Washington Senators

MLB statistics
- Win–loss record: 51–59
- Earned run average: 4.17
- Strikeouts: 352
- Stats at Baseball Reference

Teams
- Philadelphia Athletics (1936–1938); New York Yankees (1946–1948); Chicago White Sox (1948–1951); Boston Red Sox (1952); Washington Senators (1952)

Career highlights and awards
- World Series champion (1947); All-Star (1951)

Randall Pennington Gumpert (January 23, 1918 – November 25, 2008) was an American professional baseball pitcher, manager, scout and coach. A right-hander, he appeared in 261 games over ten seasons in Major League Baseball as a member of the Philadelphia Athletics, New York Yankees, Chicago White Sox, Boston Red Sox and Washington Senators (1936–1938; 1946−1952). The native of Monocacy Station, Pennsylvania, was listed as 6 feet 3 inches (1.91 m) tall and 185 pounds (84 kg).

== Pitching career ==
His pro career began at the age of 18 after he graduated from Birdsboro High School, when he was signed by the Philadelphia Athletics' legendary manager, Connie Mack, in 1936. But Gumpert had been throwing batting practice for the Athletics at Shibe Park as far back as 1934, while he was still in school. He spent his entire rookie 1936 season with Philadelphia, getting into 22 games with three starting pitcher assignments, and threw two complete games, including a two-hit, 5–2 triumph over the Chicago White Sox on August 27. It was Gumpert's first MLB victory, and the two runs he surrendered were both unearned. Gumpert spent most of 1937 and 1938 in the minor leagues, getting into only 14 games for the Athletics. In July 1939, still in the minors, he was acquired by the New York Yankees' organization.

Gumpert didn't return to the majors until April 1946. He toiled in the Yankees' farm system through 1942, then performed World War II service as a member of the United States Coast Guard (1943–1945). In 1946, he was able to make the Yankees' major league roster. In his first season with the Bombers, earning an 11–3 won–lost record with a earned run average of 2.31 in 33 games, including 12 starts, and 1322/3 innings pitched. Hampered by a sore elbow, Gumpert appeared in fewer innings the following season and his ERA ballooned to 5.43, but still compiled a 4–1 record, as the Yankees won the American League pennant. They went on to defeat the Brooklyn Dodgers in the 1947 World Series, but Gumpert did not appear in the Fall Classic.

He was exclusively a relief pitcher for the Yankees in the early months of 1948, posting a 2.88 ERA in 15 games and 25 innings pitched, but his contract was sold to the second-division White Sox on July 25. He finished the 1948 season in Chicago's starting rotation, and held his spot in the Pale Hose rotation in 1949 as well. In 1949 Gumpert posted a losing, 13–16 record for a team that went only 63–91, he set personal bests in victories, innings pitched (234), complete games (18), and shutouts (three). His elbow miseries persisted, however, and Gumpert led all American League hurlers in most home runs allowed (22). The 1950 season saw Gumpert split time between the rotation and the bullpen. He won five games and his ERA climbed to 4.75.

He rebounded in 1951; he won nine of 17 decisions for the ChiSox and a fast start earned him a spot on the 1951 American League All-Star team. However, he didn't appear in the midsummer classic, played July 10 at Detroit's Briggs Stadium and an 8–3 romp for the rival National League. On May 1, 1951, Gumpert became part of baseball history when he allowed Mickey Mantle's first home run, during a relief appearance at Comiskey Park. His value improved by his All-Star selection, Gumpert was traded that offseason, on November 13, 1951, along with outfielder Don Lenhardt to the Boston Red Sox for infielder Mel Hoderlein and pitcher Chuck Stobbs. After getting into ten games for the 1952 Red Sox, with one start, he was traded again on June 10, this time to the Washington Senators with fellow hurler Walt Masterson for Sid Hudson, another right-hander. He finished the 1952 campaign with Washington, working in 20 games, with 12 starting assignments.

His final MLB appearance came September 23, 1952, a scoreless, two-inning relief stint against the Athletics at Shibe Park. Over his ten-season career, which spanned 17 years, Gumpert won 51 games, lost 59, and compiled a 4.17 earned run average. Of his 261 games pitched, 113 were starts and 148 came out of the bullpen, and he was credited with 47 complete games, six shutouts and seven saves. He allowed 1,099 hits and 346 bases on balls, with 352 strikeouts, in 1,0522/3 innings pitched. Gumpert then played three more seasons, 1953–1955, at the highest levels of minor league baseball before hanging up his glove.

== Manager, coach and scout ==
Gumpert remained in baseball for another 39 years, managing in the Yankees' farm system (1956–1958 and 1960) and working as a minor league pitching instructor. He served as a temporary member of the Bombers' 1957 coaching staff, when, in April, Bill Dickey stepped down due to ill health; Gumpert eventually ceded his coaching post to Charlie Keller. He turned to scouting for the Yankees in 1959 (signing Doc Medich among others), and later worked for the Major League Baseball Scouting Bureau for two decades. He died in Wyomissing, Pennsylvania, in November 2008, at age 90.
