= Daniel Boone Area High School =

Coordinates: 40.256°N 75.796°W

- 501 Chestnut Street; Birdsboro, Pennsylvania 19508; United States

Information
- Type: Public
- School district: Daniel Boone Area School District
- Principal: Aaron Sborz
- Teaching staff: 77.00 (on an FTE basis)
- Grades: 9-12
- Enrollment: 972 (2023–2024)
- Student to teacher ratio: 12.62
- Colors: Carolina Blue and White
- Nickname: Blazers
- Website: Daniel Boone Area High School

Daniel Boone Area High School is located in Birdsboro, Pennsylvania, part of the Daniel Boone Area School District in south-eastern Berks County. The sports and academic teams compete as the "Blazers", and the school colors are Carolina blue and white. As of the 2017–2018 school year, there were 1,143 students enrolled at the school.

== Extracurriculars ==
Daniel Boone Area School District offers a wide variety of clubs, activities and an extensive sports program.

=== Sports ===
The school competes in the PIAA class AAAAA (5A) category in the following sports:

| Boys' | Girls' |
|---|---|
| Baseball | Softball |
| Basketball | Basketball |
| Bowling | Bowling |
| Cross Country | Cross Country |
| Football | Field Hockey |
| Golf | Cheerleading |
| Lacrosse | Lacrosse |
| Soccer | Soccer (fall) |
| Volleyball | Volleyball |
| Tennis | Tennis |
| Track and Field | Track and Field |
| Wrestling | |

According to PIAA directory July 2013

== Notable alumni ==
- Wayne Ellington - professional basketball player for the New York Knicks
- Alex Horton - Class of 2021; professional tenpin bowler; two-time champion on the PBA Tour
- Richie Kotzen - Class of 1988; guitar virtuoso and former member of Poison
- Carmelo Marrero - Class of 1999; wrestler; professional mixed martial arts fighter
- Chris Guiliano - Olympic Gold Medalist Swimmer
- Beth Mickle - Class of 1999; Feature film production designer
