= Birdsboro station (Pennsylvania Railroad) =

Birdsboro
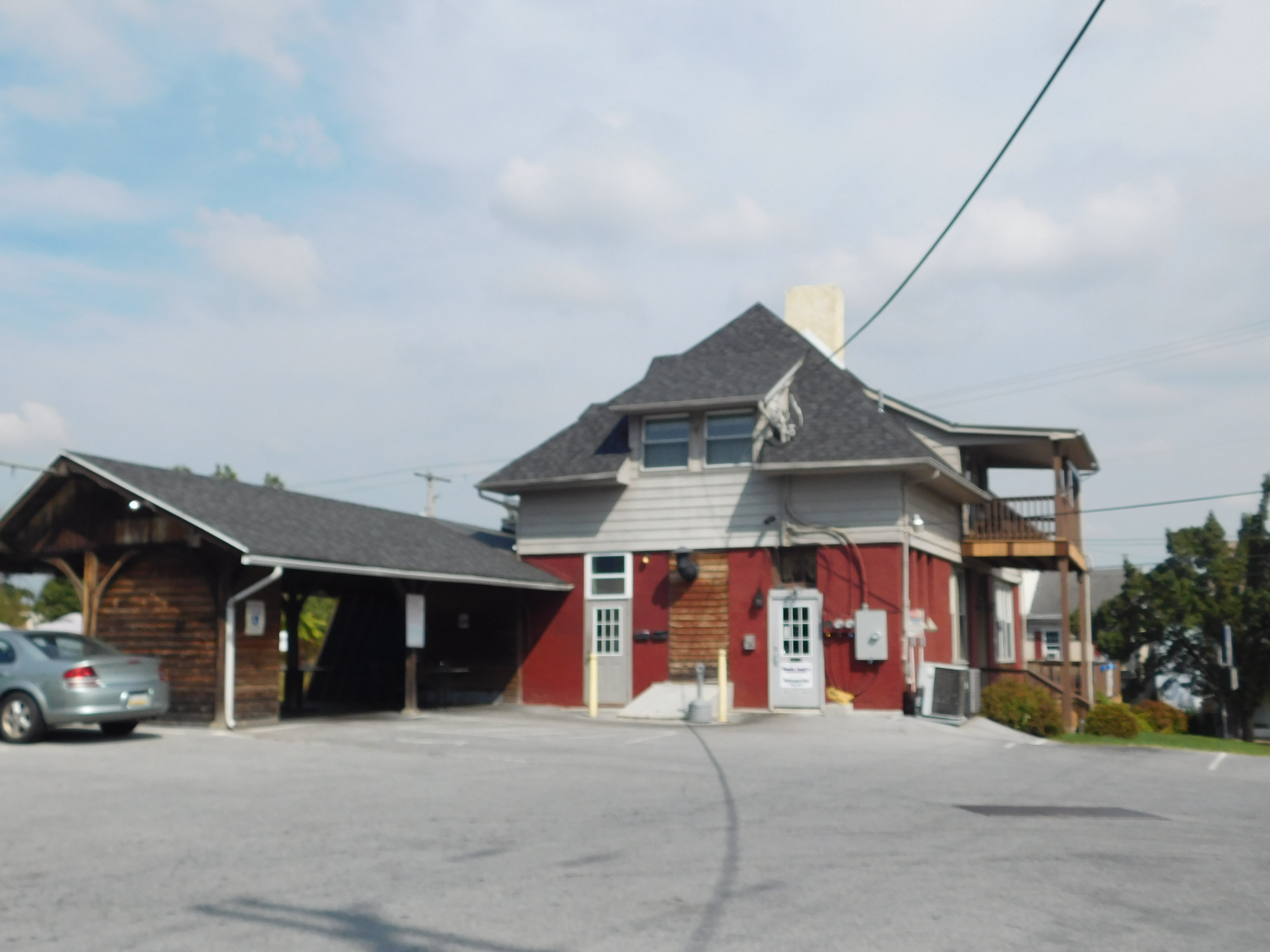
- The former passenger building in 2020

General information
- Location: Birdsboro, Pennsylvania; United States
- Coordinates: 40°15′50″N 75°48′28″W
- Line: Schuylkill Branch

History
- Closed: 1947

Former services
Preceding station	Pennsylvania Railroad	Following station
Clingan toward Pottsville	Schuylkill Branch	Monocacy toward Suburban Station
Location

Birdsboro station was a Pennsylvania Railroad station in Birdsboro, Pennsylvania. The station was located on the Pennsylvania's Schuylkill Branch. It was located at the northwest corner of Furnace Street and 1st Avenue, across the street from the Reading Company's station on the Wilmington and Northern Branch. The passenger and freight building still stand; the former is a restaurant.

== History ==
The Pennsylvania Railroad challenged the Reading's dominance in transportation of coal by building its own Schuylkill Branch. PRR "constructed the railroad from Philadelphia to Reading, by way of Norristown and Phoenixville, during 1883 and 1884, opening it to Reading on November 15, 1884. In the course of its construction the company erected four substantial bridges across the Schuylkill within the county—Douglassville, Poplar Neck, Little Dam, and Reading—and three handsome passenger stations: Douglassville, Birdsboro, Reading." Engineering for the PRR Schuylkill Branch bridges and viaducts was provided by Wilson Brothers & Company.

The Pennsylvania Railroad—Southern Division constructed a line from Philadelphia through the Schuylkill Valley in 1884. Its right of way in Birdsboro, from Cinder to Furnace Street, was a wooden trestle braced with gravel and fill, embedded in a stone wall. Atop West First Street hill, its crossing was at ground level. ... Railroad bridges crossed all streets from Furnace to Cinder Street, and were removed subsequently.

PRR built a Birdsboro station about 300 ft (91 m) north of the Reading - Wilmington & Northern station.

The station was erected on the corner of West First and Furnace Street. Ticket sales, a smoking room, and a special ladies' waiting area were on the first level, while the stationmaster and his family resided on the second level. In its peak years, 1910-1925, there were seven passenger trains daily. Excursions to the Jersey shore were popular with the public. Passenger runs on the Pennsylvania South Division ended in 1947. In later years the station was occupied commercially. It is still standing and currently houses a business.

PRR also built a wooden freight house on the corner opposite its station. All three buildings are visible in a lithographed 1890 panoramic view of the town.

By the early 21st century, the PRR freight house lay abandoned, and was slated for demolition. In 2015, the Colebrookdale Railroad Trust, a preservation society, received a grant from the Commonwealth of Pennsylvania to relocate the building to Colebrookdale. The newly relocated freight house will be part of a revitalized 40 miles of the Colebrookdale Line, between Pottstown and Boyertown, and serve as a heritage railway geared towards tourists. As of 2020, the freight house remains in Birdsboro.

The passenger building, although much altered, and is now a restaurant, Uncle Jack's Corner.
