= Birdsboro Steel =

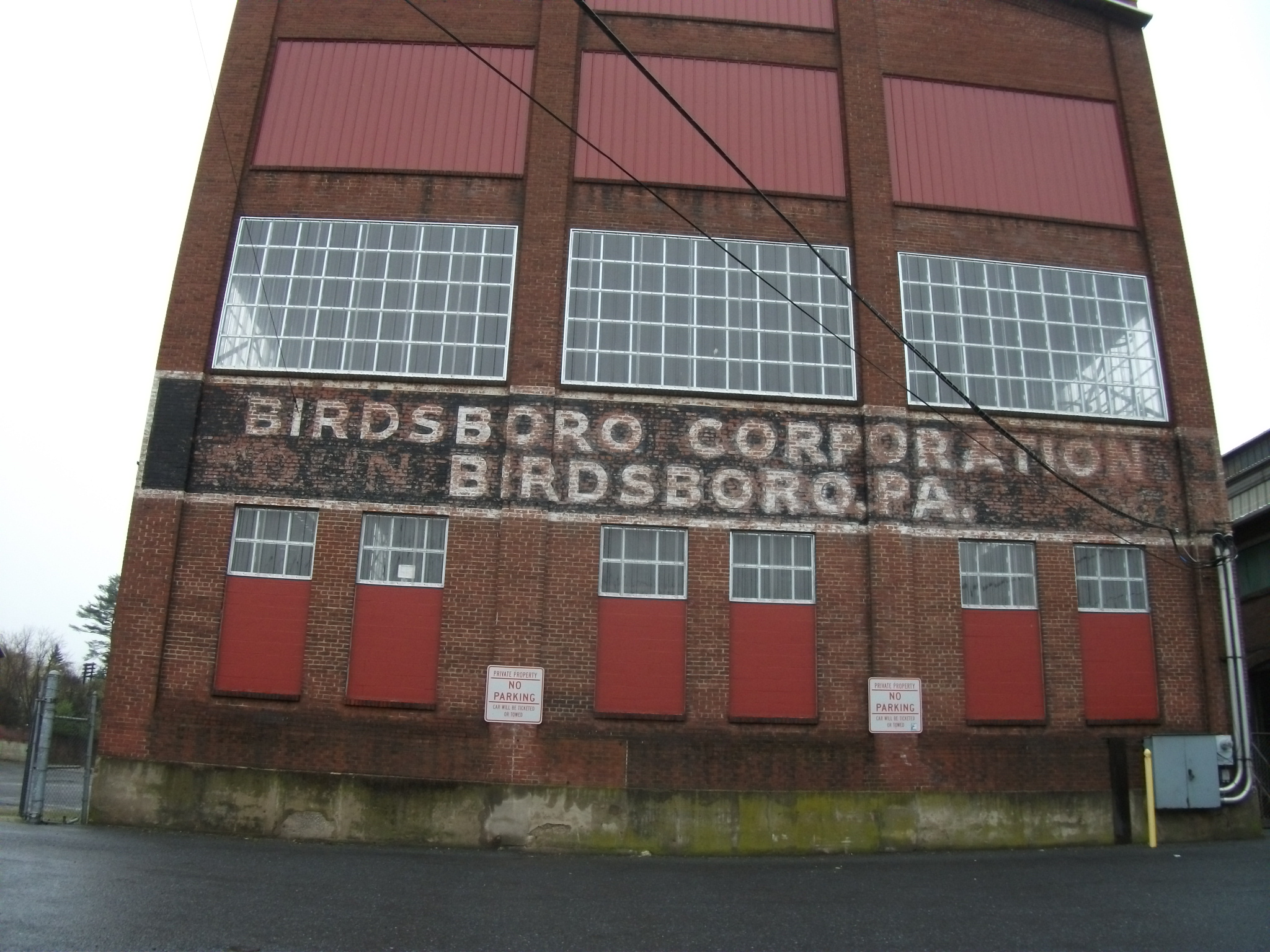
- Formerly: Birdsboro Iron Foundry Co., E&G Brooke Iron Co., Birdsboro Steel Foundry and Machine Co., Birdsboro Corp.
- Industry: Steel
- Founded: 1867
- Defunct: 1988
- Fate: Bankruptcy
- Headquarters: Birdsboro, Pennsylvania

Birdsboro Steel (officially known as Birdsboro Iron Foundry Co, E&G Brooke Iron Co, Birdsboro Steel Foundry and Machine Co, and finally Birdsboro Corp) was an American producer of steel, machines, and machine parts based in Birdsboro, Pennsylvania. The company also produced munitions, tanks, and artillery in the late 1940s through their subsidiary company, Armorcast. Though the company wasn't officially established until around 1867, the roots of the company go as far back as 1740

== History ==
=== The Birds ===
The roots of the company go as far back as 1740, when William Bird, whom had worked as an apprentice at Colebrookdale Furnace near Boyertown, bought land along the Hay Creek and Schuylkill River. On this land he erected his first forges: the Birdsborough Forge (where modern Birdsboro stands), and the New Pine Forges. Bird also built the Berkshire Furnace (also known as the Roxborough Furnace) near modern Wernersville as well as a few other forges along the Hay and Six Penny Creeks. After the death of William, his son Mark took over and expanded the forges into important iron producers in Colonial America. In 1771, Mark erected Hopewell Furnace along the French Creek. Hopewell, along with the Birds' other forges were manufacturers of munitions and armaments such as, cannons, cannonballs, and muskets at the onset of the American Revolution. After the war, the forges went through financial problems which led to the Birds being forced to sell their assets to the Brookes. They would be in charge until the property was reorganized as the Birdsboro Iron Foundry Co. and later the E&G Brooke Iron Co.

=== The Brookes ===
The forges were most successful under Brooke family management. the height of this success was during the early 19th century from 1820–1840. During the mid 19th century, due to advancements in anthracite heating to fuel furnaces along with cheaper and more efficient ways to produce steel such as with the Bessemer process, the Brookes constructed modern, anthracite fueled facilities to move the bulk of the production too. the first one was built around Monocacy along the Reading Railroad mainline and the other was built in the heart of Birdsboro over where the original Birdsborough forge stood. by 1852 the Brooke family started diversifying its operations and branching out by buying Mining operations throughout Berks and Chester counties as well as establishing a nail factory across from the main foundry in Birdsboro.

By the onset of the Civil War, the company began the production of munitions and armaments for the Union Army. Also around this time began the manufacturing of parts for railroad cars and locomotives. The holdings of the Brooke family were organized into The Birdsboro Iron Foundry Co. by 1867, and later for a short time, the E&G Brooke Iron Co. This marks the beginning of steel production for the company. In the 1880s, a tool manufacturing company called Diamond Drill and Machine Co from Pottsville, Pennsylvania began to operate a division on the Birdsboro Iron Foundry's property. This operation lasted for about ten years. In 1894, Birdsboro Iron Foundry (by then referred to as E&G Brooke Iron Co) bought Diamond Drill and Machine Co.

=== Turn of the century ===
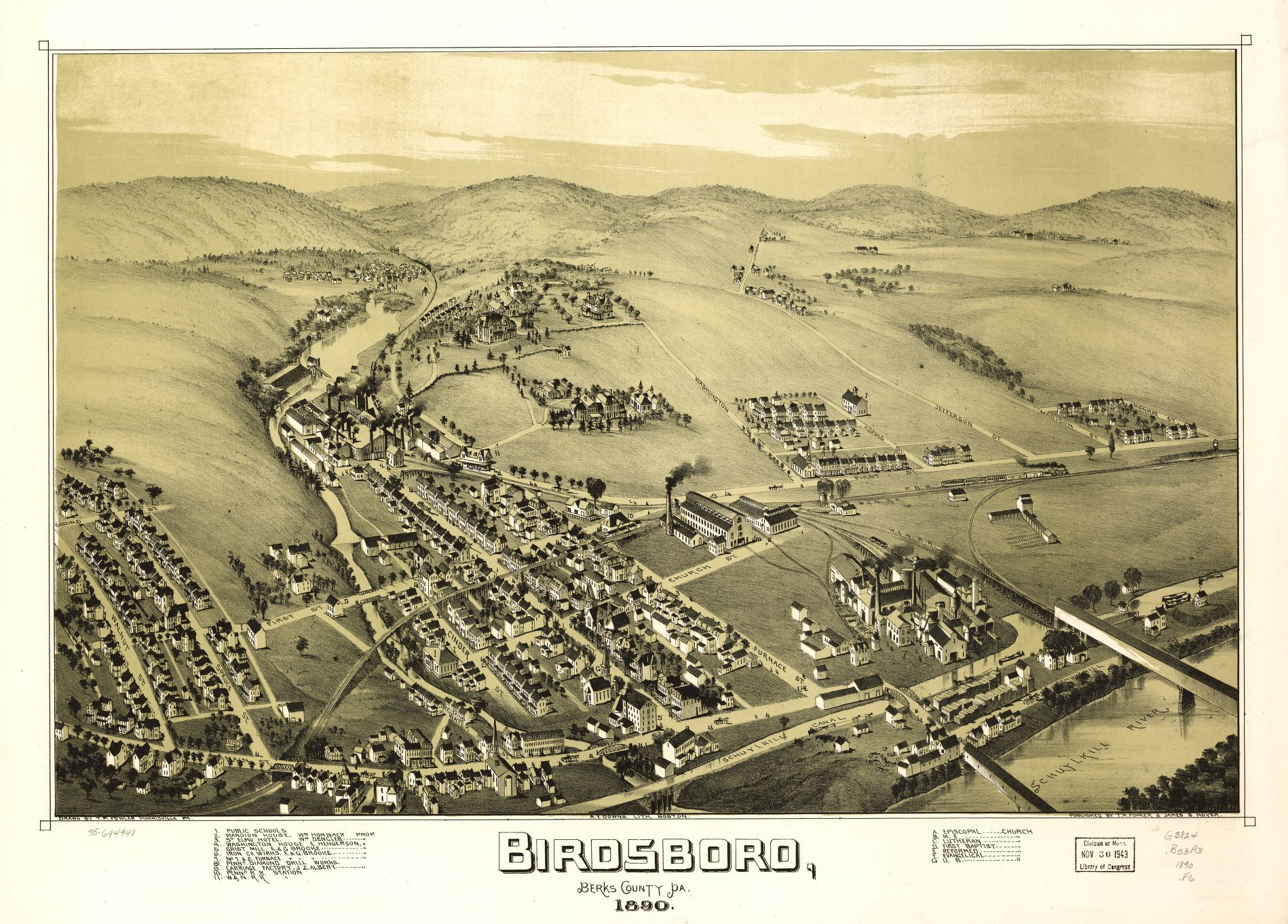
Panoramic view of Birdsboro, 1890

During late 19th century, Birdsboro's production of steel increased due to supplying the US Navy with material for building a steel fleet. Further production of supplies for the armed forces began during the Spanish–American War. By 1905 the company reorganized as Birdsboro Steel Foundry and Machine Co. With the onset of World War I in 1914, production skyrocketed due to a demand for heavy arms (artillery) for the US Army and steel for ship production for the US Navy. After the war, the company prospered due to manufacturing the steel and parts for America's railroads and cities, which grew heavily during the time.

=== Second expansion and Armorcast ===
With a growing demand for steel and Machinery, plans were made for further expansion. In 1938 Birdsboro Steel Foundry and Machine Co bought the independent steel company in Reading, Pennsylvania called the Reading Iron Company located on North Eighth Street. The company was quickly organized as Birdsboro Steel's Reading facility. By World War II, Birdsboro Steel began mass-producing steel and weapons for the war effort such as tanks and artillery, many of which were used in the Eastern Theater (War In The Pacific) fighting the Japanese. In 1944, due to a contract with the federal government to expand production of supplies for the war effort, Birdsboro Steel established its weapons manufacturing subsidiary known as Armorcast. Munitions produced by Birdsboro from the end of the Second World War up to the Vietnam War would be produced through the Armorcast subsidiary. By the end of the war, Birdsboro Steel began further manufacturing of industrial equipment such as roller mills and hydraulic press machinery, many of which are also used in the production of steel. U.S. Steel executive, Edward T. Peterson, was so impressed by Birdsboro's products that he made it an effort to promote them and their goods to the likes of Carpenter Technology Corp (formerly Carpenter Steel) in Reading.

=== Scandal and Birdsboro Corp ===
By the 1950s, Birdsboro Steel had facilities throughout southeastern Pennsylvania and Delaware. It was around this time operations for uranium and plutonium metal enrichment for military construction of nuclear weapons such as the likes of Castle Bravo, The Ivy Bombs, as well as nuclear reactors began. The facilities for enrichment were located outside of Birdsboro near the community of Gibraltar as well as Buffalo, New York. during this time Birdsboro Steel began to make deals with Pittsburgh based Mesta Machine Company. In their talks they discussed plans to copy right and patent products they produced such as cooling beds. That way, both companies could corner the market with their products and have total control and say of the price. In 1956 both companies were found out and were sued by the United States Federal Government for price fixing and anti trust violations. During the court case, evidence was brought up regarding the plan to patent cooling beds (heavy machinery for steel making) and how it was not a unique product of Birdsboro nor Mesta since it was first patented in 1872 and had since been made by other machinery builders besides Birdsboro and Mesta. By 1960, while the case was still in session, Birdsboro Steel Foundry and Machine Co reorganized for the final time as Birdsboro Corp. by 1963 both Birdsboro and Mesta were found guilty of price fixing and anti trust violations. Two years later in 1965, a sentence was delivered stating that both Birdsboro and Mesta would have to pay fines up to $25,000 as well as personal fines up to $3,500.

=== Decline and Closure ===
Though it was still one of the largest employers in the country, imports from foreign nations began to put strain on the company. The Brooke Family, whom were the sole owners of the company since the 19th century were forced to sell their assets to Victor Posner's upstart company called Pennsylvania Engineering Co based out of New Castle, Pennsylvania. Birdsboro Corp had become a subsidiary company. During the early 70s Birdsboro Corp continued to manufacture munitions for the military until 1975 when Birdsboro failed to win a government contract for tank making at Armorcast. This did major amounts of damage to the already sinking company. By 1979 Birdsboro Corp launched a $4.5 million expansion program hoping that expanding the industrial capacity and means of out put would somehow help the company recover. However, the program ended up putting the company more into debt. As a result, Birdsboro Corp began cutting wages and drastically increasing work hours leading to a strike taking place later that year putting more strain upon the company. by 1987, Victor Posner, current asset holder of Birdsboro Corp, began to file for chapter 11 bankruptcy for his companies. due to cheap imports, a lengthy strike and poor management, Birdsboro Corp officially closed its doors in 1988. Many of Birdsboro Corp's facilities were soon acquired by the likes of Carpenter Technology Corp and Lukens Steel.

== Legacy and influence ==
Birdsboro Steel Foundry and Machine Co is mostly known for its contributions in colonial America during the Revolutionary War. Hopewell Furnace is preserved as a national historic site as an example of an 18th-century iron plantation. The original foundry of Birdsboro Steel Foundry and Machine Co has been renovated into an industrial park for light industrial manufacturing in Birdsboro.

== Industrial Accomplishments ==
- Roller mills and hydraulic press machinery for Carpenter Technology Corp and plants in Singapore, China and Chile
- Side frames, wheels and other parts for railroad cars
- Defense products for the Revolutionary War, Civil War, Spanish–American War, World War I, World War II, Korean War, and Vietnam War
