= Wayne Ellington =

American basketball player (born 1987)

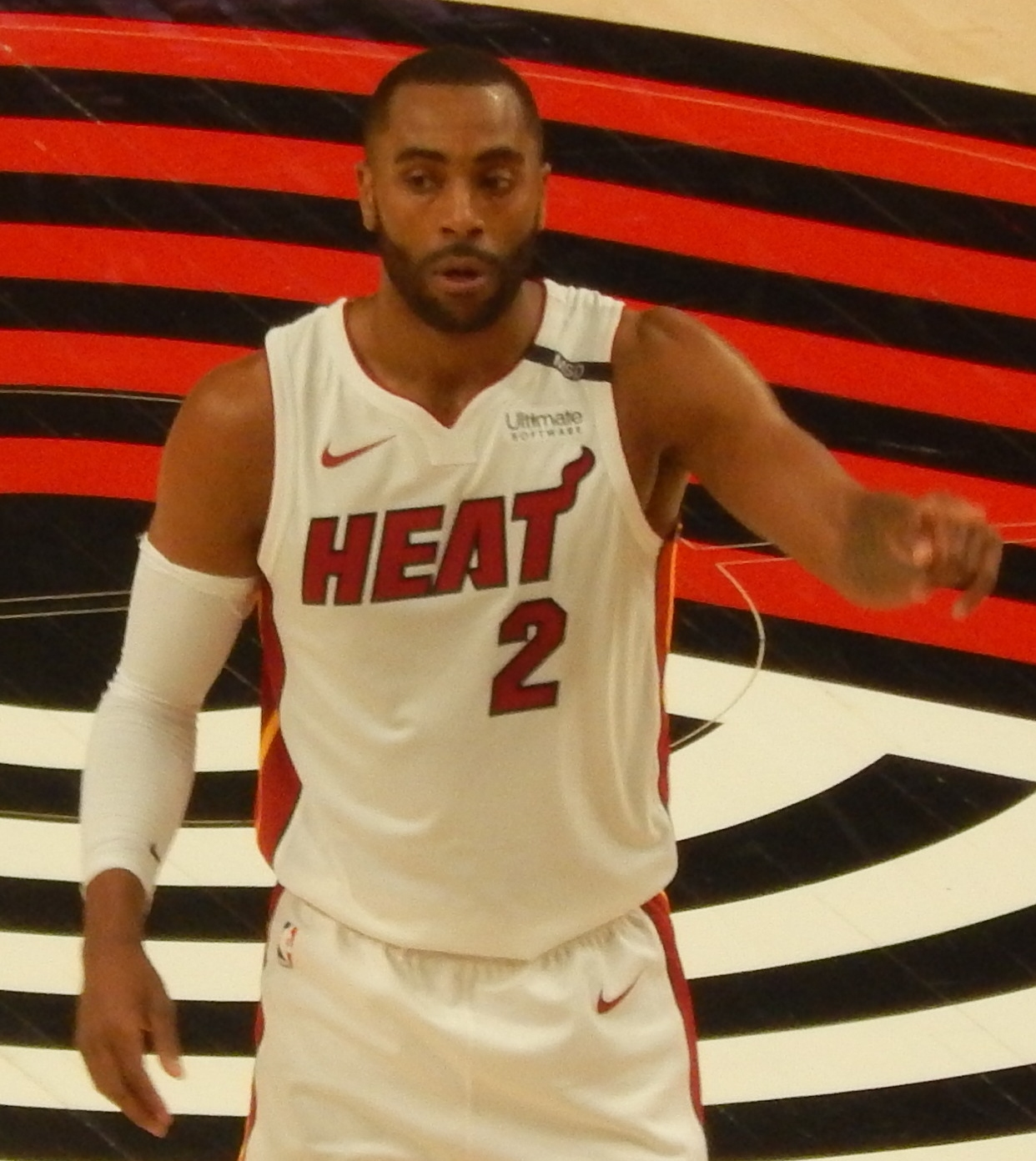
- Ellington with the Miami Heat in 2018

Miami Heat
- Title: Player development coach
- League: NBA

Personal information
- Born: November 29, 1987 (age 38) Wynnewood, Pennsylvania, U.S.
- Listed height: 6 ft 4 in (1.93 m)
- Listed weight: 207 lb (94 kg)

Career information
- High school: Daniel Boone (Birdsboro, Pennsylvania); Episcopal Academy (Merion, Pennsylvania)
- College: North Carolina (2006–2009)
- NBA draft: 2009: 1st round, 28th overall pick
- Drafted by: Minnesota Timberwolves
- Playing career: 2009–2022
- Position: Shooting guard
- Number: 19, 22, 3, 21, 2, 20, 8
- Coaching career: 2023–present

Career history

Playing
- 2009–2012: Minnesota Timberwolves
- 2012–2013: Memphis Grizzlies
- 2013: Cleveland Cavaliers
- 2013–2014: Dallas Mavericks
- 2014–2015: Los Angeles Lakers
- 2015–2016: Brooklyn Nets
- 2016–2019: Miami Heat
- 2019: Detroit Pistons
- 2019–2020: New York Knicks
- 2020–2021: Detroit Pistons
- 2021–2022: Los Angeles Lakers

Coaching
- 2023–present: Miami Heat (player development)

Career highlights
- NCAA champion (2009); NCAA Final Four Most Outstanding Player (2009); Second-team All-ACC (2008); No. 22 honored by North Carolina Tar Heels; First-team Parade All-American (2006); McDonald's All-American (2006)

Career NBA statistics
- Points: 6,190 (8.0 ppg)
- Rebounds: 1,643 (2.1 rpg)
- Assists: 852 (1.1 apg)
- Stats at NBA.com
- Stats at Basketball Reference

Wayne Robert Ellington Jr. (born November 29, 1987) is an American professional basketball coach and former player who is a player development coach for the Miami Heat of the National Basketball Association (NBA). Known for his shooting ability, he was nicknamed "the Man With The Golden Arm". He played for the University of North Carolina from 2006 to 2009. He chose to forgo his final season of college eligibility to declare for the 2009 NBA draft, and was drafted 28th overall by the Minnesota Timberwolves.

== High school career ==
Ellington scored 2,211 points in his high school career, tallying 455 points at Daniel Boone High School, and then 1,756 points at The Episcopal Academy. In his senior year, Ellington averaged 21.9 points, 8.3 rebounds, 3.2 assists and shot 39% from the three-point line. He led Episcopal to an overall record of 52–7 in his junior and senior year, and to the Inter-Academic League Conference title in his last two years going 20–0 in both seasons. (Episcopal doesn't play in state championships.)

Considered a five-star recruit by Rivals.com, Ellington was listed as the No. 1 shooting guard and the No. 8 player in the nation in 2006.

== College career ==
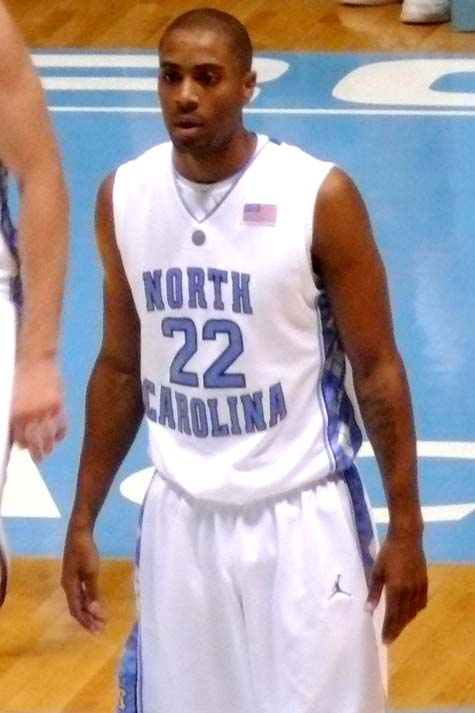
Ellington with the North Carolina Tar Heels in 2009

Ellington played in all 38 games for the ACC Champion Tar Heels in 2006–07, averaging 11.7 points per game. He was named to the 2007 ACC All-Tournament Team. His season ended on a sour note though, as North Carolina lost to Georgetown in the East Regional final of the NCAA Tournament. He had a chance to win the game in regulation, but missed a 3-pointer in the final seconds. Ellington was a member of the U.S. national team that finished fifth at the 2007 Pan American Games.

As a sophomore, Ellington saw his points-per-game average increase as the Tar Heels increasingly went to him in key moments of games. In the January 6, 2008, game at Clemson, Ellington scored a career high 36 points, including the game winning three-pointer with 0:00.4 seconds left in overtime to lead top-rated UNC over #19 Clemson 90–88. But again, his season ended in a poor fashion, as he shot only 1 for 9 from three-point range, in a loss to Kansas in a national semifinal game in the NCAA Tournament. He declared for the 2008 NBA draft after that season, but did not hire an agent, and withdrew to play his junior year at North Carolina.

As a Junior, Ellington helped lead the Tar Heels to the National Championship, where they defeated the Michigan State Spartans 89–72. He shot 7–10 from three-point range in the Final Four, and he was named to the All-Tournament Team and was named NCAA basketball tournament Most Outstanding Player. During his college career, Ellington averaged 14.7 points, 4.1 rebounds and 2.2 assists per game.

On April 23, 2009, Ellington announced that he would forgo his senior season and enter the NBA draft.

== Professional career ==
=== Minnesota Timberwolves (2009–2012) ===
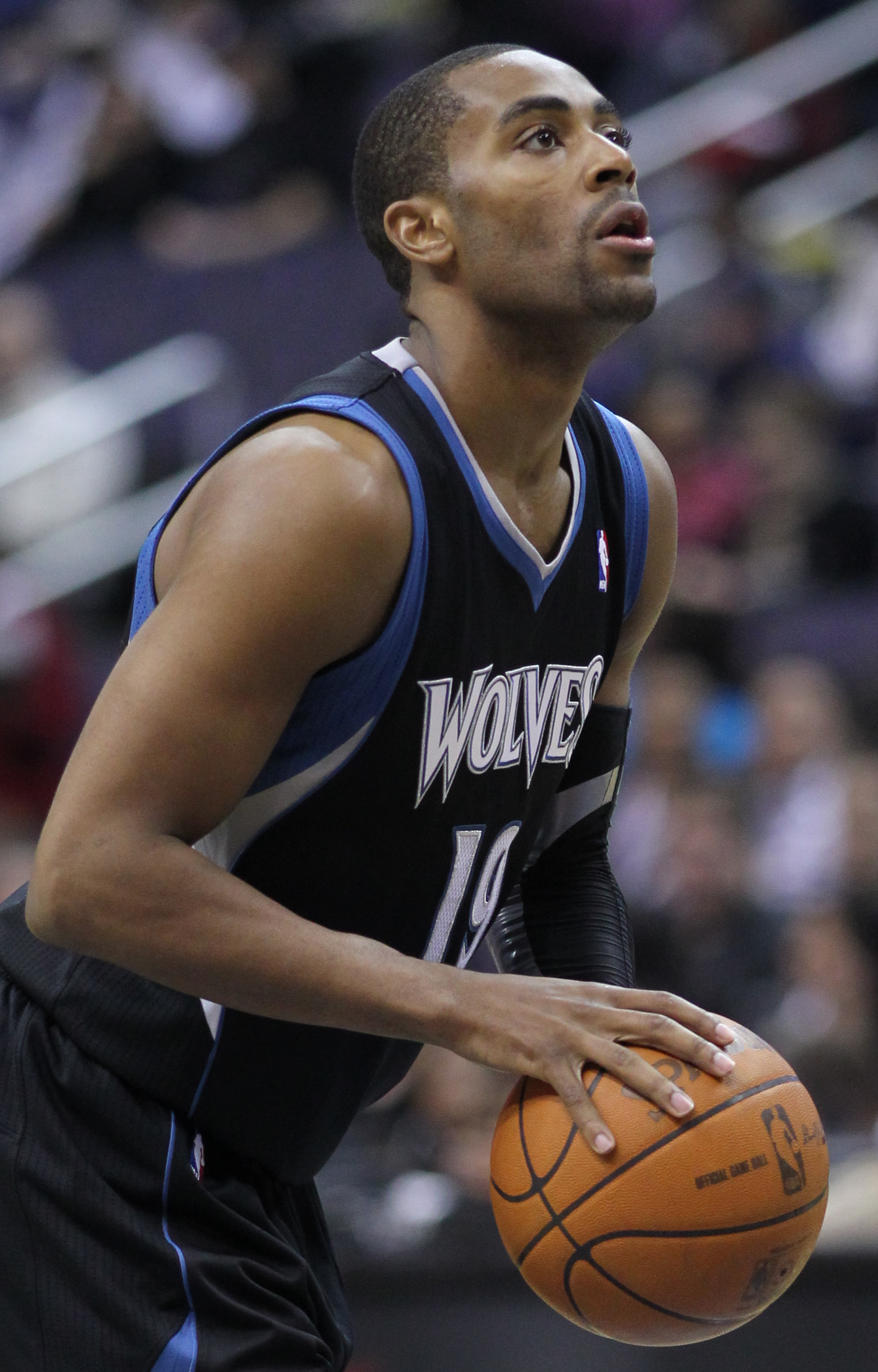
Ellington as a member of the Minnesota Timberwolves

Ellington was drafted 28th overall by the Minnesota Timberwolves in the 2009 NBA draft. He averaged 6.6 points per game and 2.1 rebounds per game in his rookie season off of the bench.

=== Memphis Grizzlies (2012–2013) ===
On July 24, 2012, Ellington was traded to the Memphis Grizzlies for forward Dante Cunningham.

On November 11, 2012, Ellington scored a career-high 25 points on 7-of-11 three-pointers in a 104–96 win over the Miami Heat. On January 7, 2013, he set a new career high with 26 points in a 113–81 win over the Sacramento Kings.

=== Cleveland Cavaliers (2013) ===
On January 22, 2013, Ellington was traded to the Cleveland Cavaliers along with Marreese Speights, Josh Selby and a future first round draft pick for forward Jon Leuer.

=== Dallas Mavericks (2013–2014) ===
On July 26, 2013, Ellington signed with the Dallas Mavericks.

=== Los Angeles Lakers (2014–2015) ===
On June 25, 2014, Ellington, along with Shane Larkin, José Calderón, Samuel Dalembert and two 2014 second-round picks, was traded to the New York Knicks in exchange for Tyson Chandler and Raymond Felton. On August 6, 2014, he was traded again, this time to the Sacramento Kings, along with Jeremy Tyler and a 2016 second round pick, in exchange for Quincy Acy and Travis Outlaw. On September 3, 2014, he was waived by the Kings.

On September 22, 2014, Ellington signed with the Los Angeles Lakers. On November 11, 2014, he took an indefinite leave of absence from the Lakers after his father was shot and killed in Philadelphia. He returned to action on November 21, 2014. On January 27, 2015, he scored a career-high 28 points in a 98–92 loss to the Washington Wizards. He finished the season having played 65 games after being ruled out for the rest of the season on April 2, 2015, with a shoulder injury.

=== Brooklyn Nets (2015–2016) ===
On July 10, 2015, Ellington signed with the Brooklyn Nets. On December 28, 2015, he scored a season-high 26 points and tied a career high with seven made three-pointers in a 111–105 win over the Miami Heat. On April 27, 2016, Ellington was named recipient of the 2015–16 J. Walter Kennedy Citizenship Award as selected by the Pro Basketball Writers Association (PBWA).

=== Miami Heat (2016–2019) ===
On July 10, 2016, Ellington signed with the Miami Heat. He made his debut for the Heat on November 28, 2016, against the Boston Celtics after missing the first 16 games of the season with a bruised thigh; he played 27 minutes and scored nine points.

On December 22, 2017, Ellington tied a career high with 28 points and had a career-high eight 3-pointers in a 113–101 win over the Dallas Mavericks. On March 21, 2018, in a 119–98 win over the New York Knicks, Ellington hit his 200th 3-pointer of the season, making him the third Heat player with that many in a season, joining Damon Jones (225) and Tim Hardaway Sr. (203). In the Heat's regular season finale on April 11, 2018, Ellington scored a career-high 32 points while setting Miami's single-season record for 3-pointers, as the Heat wrapped up the No. 6 seed in the Eastern Conference playoffs by beating the Toronto Raptors 116–109 in overtime. Ellington needed six 3-pointers in the finale to beat the record of 225 that Jones set in the 2004–05 season. He finished the season with 227.

On July 13, 2018, Ellington re-signed with the Heat.

On February 6, 2019, Ellington was traded, along with Tyler Johnson, to the Phoenix Suns in exchange for Ryan Anderson. He was waived by the Suns the following day.

=== Detroit Pistons (2019) ===
On February 9, 2019, Ellington signed with the Detroit Pistons.

=== New York Knicks (2019–2020) ===
On July 9, 2019, Ellington signed with the New York Knicks. He made his debut for the team on October 23, 2019, scoring three points in a 111–120 loss to the San Antonio Spurs. On February 8, 2020, Ellington logged a season-high 17 points, alongside five rebounds and three assists, in a 95–92 win over the Detroit Pistons.

On November 19, 2020, the Knicks waived Ellington.

=== Return to the Pistons (2020–2021) ===
On December 2, 2020, Ellington signed with the Pistons. On March 3, 2021, he scored a season-high 25 points, alongside two steals, in a 129–105 win over the Toronto Raptors.

=== Return to the Lakers (2021–2022) ===
On August 6, 2021, Ellington signed with the Los Angeles Lakers. On April 10, 2022, he scored a season-high 18 points in a 146–141 overtime win over the Denver Nuggets.

== Coaching career ==
On September 29, 2023, the Miami Heat hired Ellington as a player development coach.

== Career statistics ==
Legend
GP	Games played	GS	Games started	MPG	Minutes per game
FG%	Field goal percentage	3P%	3-point field goal percentage	FT%	Free throw percentage
RPG	Rebounds per game	APG	Assists per game	SPG	Steals per game
BPG	Blocks per game	PPG	Points per game	**Bold**	Career high

=== NBA ===
==== Regular season ====
Year	Team	GP	GS	MPG	FG%	3P%	FT%	RPG	APG	SPG	BPG	PPG
2009–10	Minnesota	76	1	18.2	.424	.395	.871	2.1	1.0	.3	.1	6.6
2010–11	Minnesota	62	8	19.0	.403	.397	.792	1.7	1.2	.5	.0	6.6
2011–12	Minnesota	51	4	19.1	.404	.324	.800	1.9	.6	.5	**.2**	6.1
2012–13	Memphis	40	4	16.9	.407	.423	**.938**	1.3	1.1	.4	.0	5.5
2012–13	Cleveland	38	17	25.9	.439	.371	.898	3.0	**1.6**	.8	.1	10.4
2013–14	Dallas	45	1	8.7	.437	**.424**	.909	1.0	.4	.4	.0	3.2
2014–15	L.A. Lakers	65	36	25.8	.412	.370	.813	**3.2**	**1.6**	.5	.0	10.0
2015–16	Brooklyn	76	**41**	21.3	.389	.358	.857	2.3	1.1	.6	.1	7.7
2016–17	Miami	62	13	24.2	.416	.378	.860	2.1	1.1	.6	.1	10.5
2017–18	Miami	**77**	2	26.5	.407	.392	.859	2.8	1.0	.7	.1	11.2
2018–19	Miami	25	12	21.3	.375	.368	.875	1.9	1.2	1.0	.1	8.4
2018–19	Detroit	28	26	**27.3**	.421	.373	.758	2.1	1.5	**1.1**	.1	**12.0**
2019–20	New York	36	1	15.5	.351	.350	.846	1.8	1.2	.4	.1	5.1
2020–21	Detroit	46	31	22.0	**.441**	.422	.800	1.8	1.5	.4	**.2**	9.6
2021–22	L.A. Lakers	43	9	18.8	.414	.389	.818	1.8	.7	.5	.1	6.7
Career		770	206	20.9	.410	.382	.843	2.1	1.1	.5	.1	8.0

==== Playoffs ====
Year	Team	GP	GS	MPG	FG%	3P%	FT%	RPG	APG	SPG	BPG	PPG
2014	Dallas	2	0	7.0	.333	.333	**1.000**	1.0	1.0	.0	.0	4.0
2018	Miami	**5**	0	20.2	**.343**	**.400**	**1.000**	1.6	.6	.4	**.4**	**7.8**
2019	Detroit	4	4	**32.8**	.314	.318	**1.000**	**3.8**	**1.3**	.8	.0	**7.8**
Career		11	4	22.4	.329	.362	1.000	2.3	.9	.5	.2	7.1

=== College ===
Year	Team	GP	GS	MPG	FG%	3P%	FT%	RPG	APG	SPG	BPG	PPG
2006–07	North Carolina	38	37	23.9	.433	.371	**.836**	2.9	2.1	.8	.0	11.7
2007–08	North Carolina	**39**	**38**	**31.1**	.467	.400	.826	4.5	2.0	**1.1**	**.2**	**16.6**
2008–09	North Carolina	38	37	30.4	**.483**	**.417**	.777	**4.9**	**2.7**	.9	**.2**	15.8
Career		115	112	28.5	.463	.397	.809	4.1	2.2	.9	.1	14.7

== See also ==
- 2006 high school boys basketball All-Americans
