= Birdsboro station (Reading Railroad) =

Railway station in Birdsboro, Pennsylvania

Birdsboro
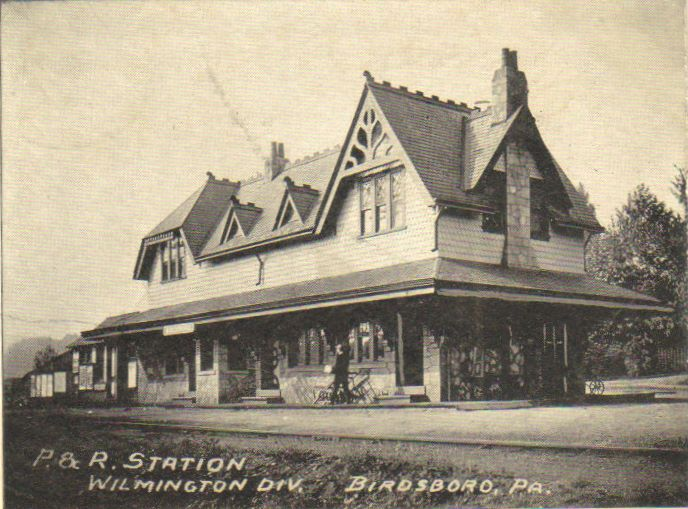
- Reading - Wilmington & Northern station (1884-1885, demolished 1963)

General information
- Location: S. Furnace Street, Birdsboro, Pennsylvania, U.S.
- Coordinates: 40°15′48″N 75°48′29″W
- Lines: Wilmington & Northern (Reading)
- Platforms: 1 side platform
- Tracks: 2

Construction
- Structure type: at-grade
- Architect: Frank Furness (attributed); Levi Focht (likely contractor)
- Architectural style: Eclectic/Queen Anne

History
- Opened: c.1870 (W & N depot); 1878 (Reading - Main Line); 1885 (Reading - W & N station)
- Closed: 1949 (Reading - W & N); 1963 (Reading - W & N station demolished); 1981 (Reading - Main Line station)

Former services
Preceding station	SEPTA	Following station
Franklin Street toward Pottsville	Pottsville Line	Pottstown toward Reading Terminal
Preceding station	Reading Railroad	Following station
Lorane toward Pottsville	Main Line	Monocacy toward Philadelphia
Reading Terminus	Wilmington and Northern Branch	Joanna toward Wilmington
Location

The Reading Company used two passenger railway stations in or near Birdsboro, Pennsylvania. The Philadelphia and Reading Railroad built a station (1878, demolished?) on its Main Line in Exeter Township, on the opposite side of the Schuylkill River from Birdsboro. The Wilmington and Northern Railroad established a freight line to Birdsboro in 1870, but it was not until after its merger with the Reading Company that its passenger station (1884–1885, demolished 1963) was built in the borough.

== Reading Railroad ==
The Main Line of the Reading Railroad opened in 1842, and ran along the left bank of the Schuylkill River. This was built to compete with the Schuylkill Canal, which ran along the river's right bank (and through Birdsboro). Transportation by rail was much more expensive, but the Reading could deliver coal (or other freight) to Philadelphia in 5 hours, versus 6 days via the canal. By the late 1850s, the Reading was carrying more tonnage than the canal. In 1870, the Reading leased the Schuylkill Canal and turned its right of way into a parallel rail line, bypassing the City of Reading.

=== Main Line station ===
The Reading built a Birdsboro station (1878, demolished?) on its Main Line in Exeter Township, on the opposite side of the river from the borough, and just east of its Schuylkill River Bridge - Birdsboro.

The Reading Railroad filed for bankruptcy in 1971, and was merged with the Pennsylvania Railroad to form Conrail, in 1976. Passenger service on the Reading's Main Line was assumed by SEPTA and provided by SEPTA diesel service. SEPTA cancelled rail service on the line in 1981, replacing it with bus service. Conrail was broken up in 1999, and its assets divided between Norfolk Southern Railway and CSX Transportation.

== Wilmington & Northern Railroad ==
"The Wilmington & Northern Railroad opened in 1870, extending from Birdsboro southwardly to Chester county line, a distance of ten miles." Brothers Edward and George Brooke were third generation Birdsboro ironmakers, and consolidated their holdings in 1871 as the E. & G. Brooke Iron Company (later Birdsboro Steel). The Wilmington & Northern began as a freight line, providing access to the Brookes' iron ore mines in southern Berks County, and transporting their workers back and forth.

Following the W & N's merger with the Reading Railroad, the line was extended another 53.6 mi (86.3 km) to Wilmington, Delaware. Passenger service was established between the City of Reading and Wilmington in 1878. The Reading's Wilmington & Northern Division divided at Birdsboro, either crossing the Schuylkill River to merge with the Reading's Main Line; or making a 90 degree turn west, as the Reading's Belt Line.

The Wilmington & Northern Railroad, built through the Hay Creek Valley, opened a line to Birdsboro in 1870. George and Edward Brooke were early investors of the company. Following its merger with the Reading Railroad, the Wilmington & Northern tracks served as the route of the Belt Line, a freight track used to avoid the congested Reading area. Passenger service ended on the "W & N" in 1949.

=== Reading - W & N station ===
The necessity for the new passenger station at Birdsboro has been discussed in previous reports. The building, which is finished and in use, is a commodious and substantial structure.

Frank Furness was the Reading's chief architect, and design of the station is attributed to him. Contractor Levi Focht, a Birdsboro resident who constructed many of Furness's buildings for the Reading, probably built it. Construction of the station was begun in 1884, and completed in 1885, at a cost of $4,828.20, equal to $173,010 today. A freight station was also built, at a cost of $665.84, equal to $23,859 today. Following the curve of the tracks, the station was set at a slight angle to Birdsboro's street grid, and was located along the east side of Furnace Street. Safety gates were installed at the grade crossings of Furnace Street and West First Street. Prior to the station's construction, a W & N depot had stood at the site.

The photograph above shows the station in 1907, with the tracks in the foreground. Its first story was faced with stone, with an overhang, carried on brackets, continuous around all four sides. The east facade (facing the tracks) featured two doors and two triple windows at the north end (waiting room?), and a bay window, door and double window at the south end (ticket office?). The second story was faced with fish-scale shingles, and featured a large gable with a triple window screened by tracery, two small triangular dormers, and another gable with a triple window and jerkinhead roof. The station's roof was probably slate, and its ridges were accented with cresting and finials. The building featured two chimneys, with one of them breaking through the north gable.

Furness had made c.1875 alterations to Edward Brooke's Greek Revival mansion, Brooke Manor (uphill from the station), and George Brooke funded Furness's expansion of Birdsboro's Episcopal church, 1884-1885 (contemporaneous with the station). When George Brooke's eldest son married in 1887, Furness designed (and Focht built) a Birdsboro mansion for the couple.

The Wilmington & Northern station at Birdsboro was demolished in 1963. The site is now occupied by the unused SEPTA station.
