= William E. Carter =

American Titanic survivor (1875–1940)

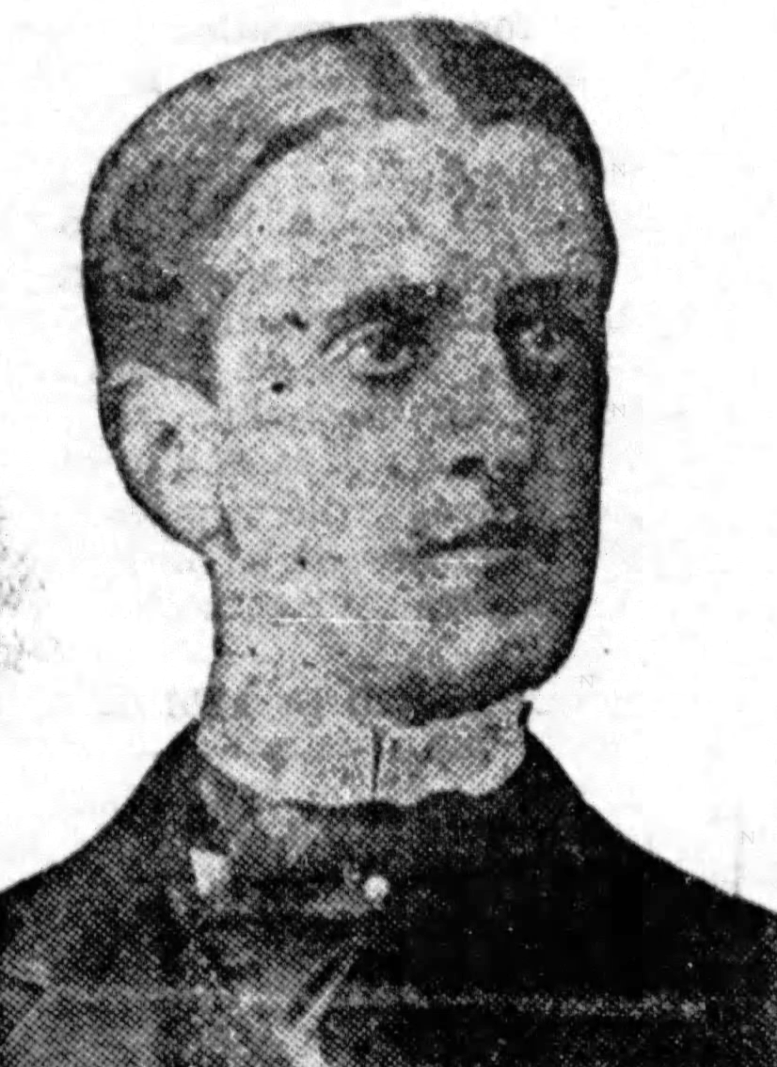
- Born: William Ernest Carter; June 19, 1875; Philadelphia, Pennsylvania, U.S.
- Died: March 20, 1940 (aged 64); Palm Beach, Florida, U.S.
- Burial place: West Laurel Hill Cemetery, Bala Cynwyd, Pennsylvania, U.S.
- Education: University of Pennsylvania
- Known for: Surviving the RMS Titanic
- Spouse: Lucile Carter
- Children: Lucile Polk Carter Reeves; William Thornton Carter II

William Ernest Carter (June 19, 1875 – March 20, 1940) was an American millionaire, polo player, and survivor of the RMS Titanic.

== Early life ==
Carter was born in Philadelphia, Pennsylvania. His parents were Cordelia "Nellie" Miranda (née Redington) and William Thornton Carter, a coal and iron baron. The family lived at 2116 Walnut Street in Philadelphia. He attended the University of Pennsylvania, where he was a member of the class of 1896 and Fraternity of Delta Psi (St. Anthony Hall). However, he dropped out of college to focus on polo and hunting.

Carter showed little interest in family businesses or philanthropies but did work as a stockbroker. He was a member of the Bryn Mawr Benedicts polo club, the Newport Reading Room, the Pennsylvania Society of Sons of the Revolution, the Philadelphia Country Club, the Racket Club, the Radnor Hunt, the Rittenhouse Club, and the St. Anthony Club.

== Marriage ==
Carter married Lucile Stewart Polk of Baltimore, Maryland, on January 29, 1896. They met the previous summer at Narragansett and fell in "love at first sight." The couple also had a common interest in sports.

A few months after his marriage, Carter turned 21 and inherited a fortune from his father's estate. The couple initially lived at 1910 Rittenhouse Square in Philadelphia, but their country residence Gwedna in Bryn Mawr, Pennsylvania, soon became their main home. They had two children: Lucile Polk Carter Reeves (born 1897 or 1898) and William Thornton Carter II (born 1900). The family spent their summers in Newport, Rhode Island, in the cottage Quatrefoil, which they purchased in 1901.

The fashionable couple was part of the high society of Baltimore, New York, Newport, Philadelphia, and Washington, D.C. They also frequently traveled to England and other parts of Europe. On February 20, 1906, Carter was presented to King Edward VII. In May 1911, the Carter family sailed aboard the RMS Lusitania to attend the coronation celebration of King George V and Queen consort Mary of Teck, and stayed for the polo and hunting seasons.

== Titanic ==
In March 1912, the Carter family decided to return to America after almost eight months in England. They made reservations on the RMS Olympic, departing from Southampton on April 3, but changed their plans at the last minute and booked cabins on RMS Titanic.

Carter, his wife Lucile, and their children boarded the Titanic at Southampton as first-class passengers. They occupied cabins B-96 and B-98. They were traveling with Carter's manservant, Alexander Cairns, and Lucile's maid or governess, Augusta Serreplaà. Carter's chauffeur Augustus Aldworth was in second class. Carter's 25 horsepower Renault Towncar Type CB Coupe de Ville was in the forward hold. He was also traveling with his polo ponies.

On April 14, the night the ship struck the iceberg, the Carters attended a dinner party held in honor of Captain Edward Smith in the à la carte restaurant. After dinner, the ladies retired and the men played cards in the first-class smoking room. This is where Carter was at 11:40 p.m. when the ship stopped after the impact. Carter returned to his cabin and woke his wife, telling her to get dressed and head to the deck. Lucile, Serreplaà, and the two children were lowered into Lifeboat 4 by Carter. Carter was not allowed on a lifeboat because of the women and children first policy; instead, he helped load and lower other lifeboats. Lucile told The Baltimore Sun, "I kissed my husband good-bye and as he stood on the deck I went down the side of the lifeboat. There were no seamen there. It was for life or death. I took an oar and started to row." This was around 1:50 a.m. The women, including Mrs. John Borland Thayer and Mrs. John Jacob Astor, had difficulties rowing fast enough to keep the lifeboat from going down with the Titanic.

Carter ended up near Collapsible Boat C, the last lifeboat on the ship. A group of men rushed the lifeboat, but a purser fired his gun and secured it for women and children. When all the women and children were on board, the lifeboat was approved to be lowered. At this point, J. Bruce Ismay, the managing director of the White Star Line, stepped aboard Lifeboat C, along with Carter. Both men rowed Lifeboat C until they reached a rescue ship, the RMS Carpathia.

Carter arrived at the Carpathia ahead of his family and waited on the deck. When Lifeboat 4 arrived, Carter "did not recognize his son under a big ladies hat and called out for him: according to some sources John Jacob Astor had placed the hat on the boy and explained that he was now a girl and should be allowed into the boat. Other sources suggest the more likely scenario that it was his mother in response to Chief Second Steward George Dodd's order that no more boys were to enter Lifeboat 4."

The Washington Times reported that Carter was "much shaken by his experience and his face showed lines of suffering." Carter said, "Terrible, terrible. No pen can ever depict and no tongue can ever describe adequately the terrors of our experience. Everywhere was a cold, hopeless despair and grief in its most hellish forms. Some were dumb with horror; others beat their breasts like things crazed, and a few laughed hysterically and insanely."

== Aftermath ==
Carter was controversial as a male survivor of the Titanic, in part because he got in the last lifeboat with Ismay, who many thought should have gone down with his company's ship. On April 22, 1912, Carter defended himself and Ismay, saying: "The statements which have been made by Mr. Ismay's conduct are an injustice to him. …The women that were in the boat were from steerage, with their children. I guess there were about forty of them. Mr. Ismay and myself and several of the officers walked up and down the deck, crying 'Are there more women here?' We called for several minutes and got no answer. One of the officers then declared that if we wanted to we could get into the boat if we took the place of a seaman. He gave us this preference because we were among the first-class passengers. Mr. Ismay called again, and after we got no reply we got into the lifeboat. We took the oars and rowed with the two seamen."

On June 5, 1912, in Bryn Mawr, Carter was playing polo with the Bryn Mawr Benedicts against the Philadelphia Country Club's B Team when he turned his pony too quickly causing its legs to buckle. Carter fell on his head, and the pony rolled on top of him. Carter was knocked unconscious with a concussion and internal injuries. Three physicians attended him on the polo grounds for nearly thirty minutes, but were unable to bring him back to consciousness. Although most news accounts say Carter received a "slight concussion," it appears he was actually in a coma, as he was still unconscious days later. In July, his mother told the press that he had a fractured skull. She said, "It will be a long time before he is able to be out again…." He spent the rest of the summer in Dark Harbor, Maine, recovering. He survived, but was unable to play polo again.

Two years later, on June 15, 1914, the Carters divorced. Lucile filed for divorce on January 23, 1914, because Carter deserted her on the Titanic. In her testimony, she said, "When the Titanic struck, my husband came to our stateroom and said 'Get up and dress yourself and the children.' I never saw him again until I arrived on the Carpathia at 8 o'clock the next morning, when I saw him lying on the rail. All he said was that he had had a jolly good breakfast and that he never thought I would make it." This version of events was significantly different from what she told reporters in 1912. Lucile also stated that Carter frequently boxed her ears, once kicked her in the back, cheated on her with other women, and "was nearly always drunk." Lucile told a newspaper "On one occasion, my husband picked up a grasshopper and began pulling out its legs, and when I remonstrated with him, he dashed into the house and procured a horsewhip and proceeded to lash me with it." She also complained about his constant traveling. Carter did not offer any testimony in the divorce hearing. However, once the newspapers made Lucile's statements public, Carter did counter, saying he helped his wife, Mrs. Astor, and Mrs. Widener onto their lifeboat.

After the divorce, the Bryn Mawr home was sold. Lucile remarried quickly, on August 16, 1914. Carter never remarried and lived at Ivy Cottage in Rosemont, Pennsylvania. He worked in banking with Cassatt & Company in Philadelphia. He continued to travel to England for the hunting season. He also judged horse shows in New York and Philadelphia.

== Later life ==
In 1925, Carter purchased a property in Unionville, Pennsylvania, where he built a lodge with adjacent old-wood riparian forests where he could hunt. He called this property Gwenda Farm, and this became the residence where he spent much of his time. However, this was not a simple hunting lodge or farmhouse. The two-story stone house was designed by the Philadelphia architectural firm of John S. Cornell & Sons. There was also a carriage house and stables with six large stalls. Carter also raised prize-winning Angus cattle at Gwenda Farm.

He retained his summer home, Quatrefoil, on Narragansett Avenue in Newport. In his last few years, he spent winters at the Breakers in Palm Beach, Florida. In March 1940, he died of empyema of the gallbladder while on vacation in Palm Beach, Florida. He was buried in West Laurel Hill Cemetery in Bala Cynwyd, Pennsylvania.

== Popular culture ==
Carter's Renault was the setting of Jack and Rose's love scene in James Cameron’s 1997 film Titanic.

== See also ==
- Passengers of the RMS Titanic
