= Renault Towncar =

Renault Town Car
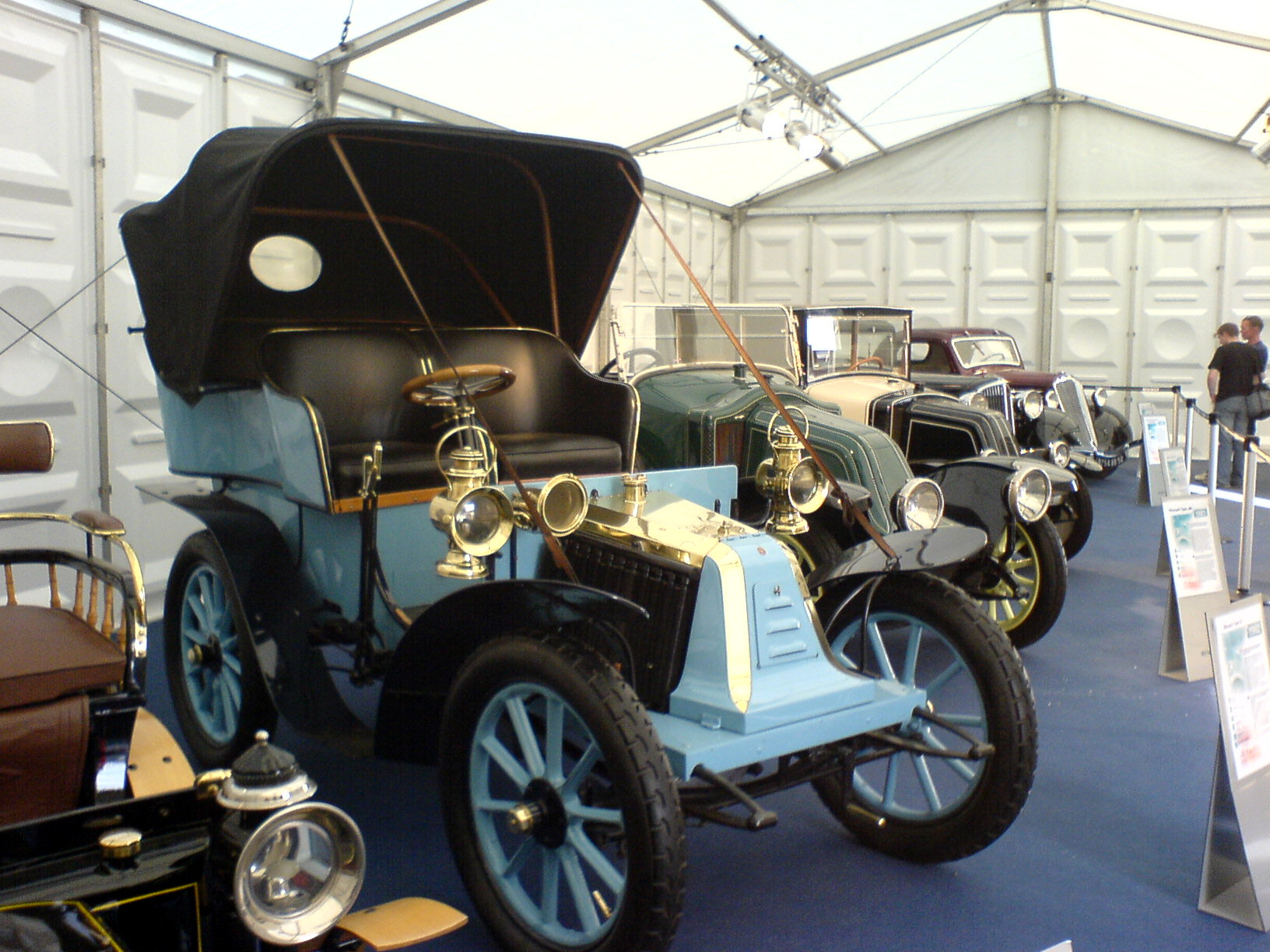
- Renault Type G (1902)

Overview
- Manufacturer: Renault
- Production: 1912–1933
- Designer: Louis Renault

Body and chassis
- Class: Luxury-class car
- Body style: 4-door sedan
- Layout: FR layout

Powertrain
- Engine: 7539 cc straight-6, 35hp

The Renault Type CB Town Car was an automobile manufactured between 1912 and 1933 by Renault.

In 1912, William E. Carter bought one and was planning to transport it from Southampton, England, to New York City on the RMS Titanic. Carter was saved, but the car sunk in the Atlantic. A replica was requested by James Cameron and 20th Century Fox for their 1997 film Titanic. They looked for Carter's original documents for the vehicle, and the car was recreated almost exactly.
