= St. Michael's Episcopal Church (Birdsboro, Pennsylvania) =

Historic church in Pennsylvania, United States

- St. Michael's Episcopal Church, Parish House and Rectory
- U.S. National Register of Historic Places
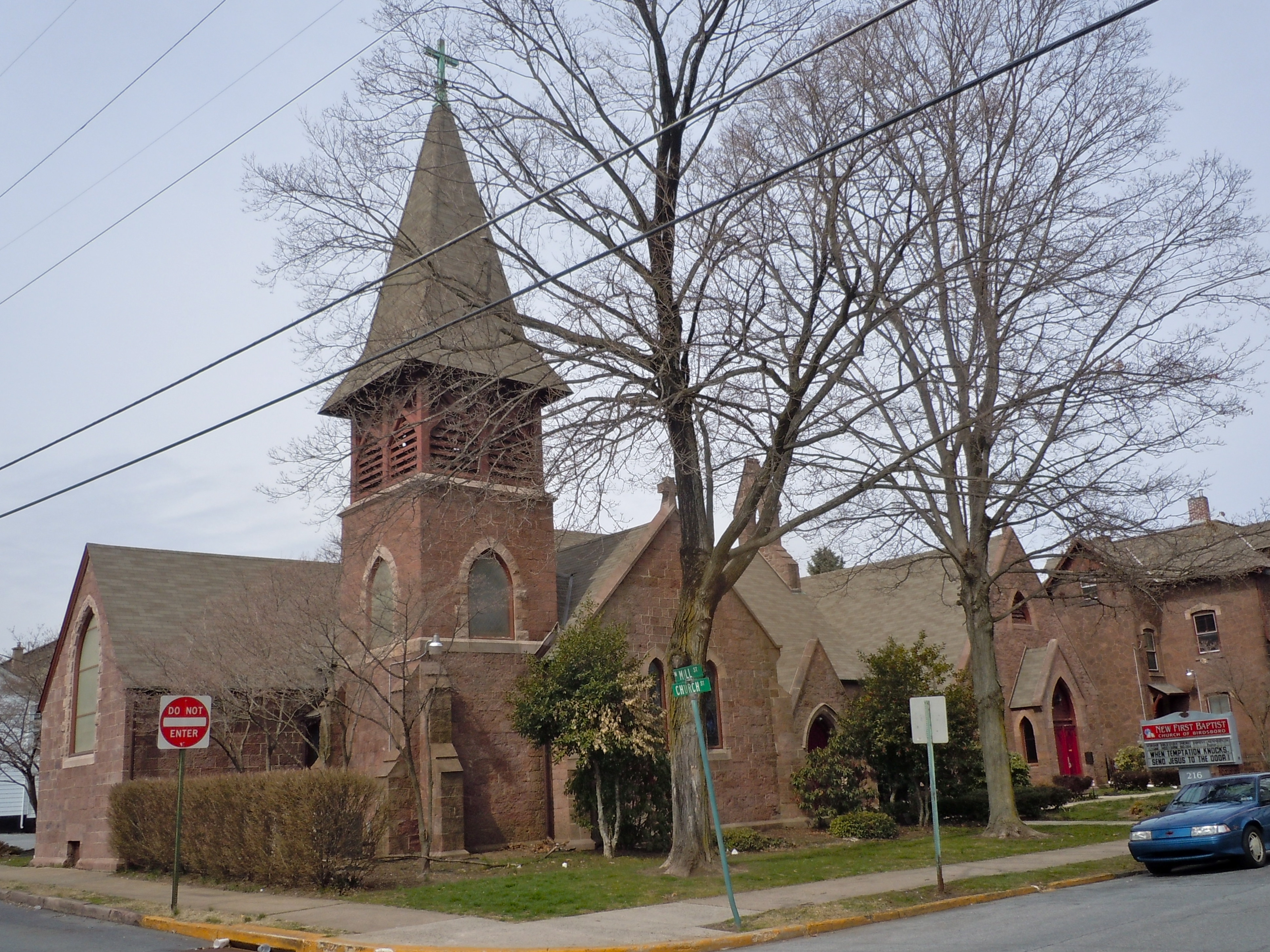
- New First Baptist Church of Birdsboro in 2011. St. Michael's was renamed in 2005.

- Location within Pennsylvania Location within the United States
- Location: Mill and Church Sts., Birdsboro, Pennsylvania
- Coordinates: 40°15′54″N 75°48′26″W
- Area: 0.8 acres (0.32 ha)
- Built: 1853, 1873, 1877-78, expanded 1884-85, 1892
- Architect: George Brooke, Furness & Evans; Levi H. Focht, contractor
- Architectural style: Gothic Revival, Late Victorian
- NRHP reference No.: 82001531
- Added to NRHP: December 20, 1982

St. Michael's Episcopal Church, Parish House and Rectory is a group of architecturally-significant religious buildings located at 200-216 North Mill Street in Birdsboro, Berks County, Pennsylvania. It was added to the U.S. National Register of Historic Places in 1982.

Prior to the 2003 removal of its stained-glass windows, pipe organ, and interior furnishings, the building was considered the most unaltered of Victorian architect Frank Furness's churches. The property was sold in 2005, and is now the New First Baptist Church of Birdsboro.

== Built in 1853 ==
St. Michael's congregation was founded in 1851, and the original church was built in 1853 on land donated by brothers Edward and George Brooke, proprietors of the Birdsboro Iron Foundry Company (later Birdsboro Steel Corporation). George designed the "Norman-Gothic" church building, and he and his brother donated the organ, the bell for its gable bellcote, and other interior and exterior improvements. The Parish House (probably designed by George) — housing a chapel, the Sunday School, and a reading room — was completed in 1873, and was a gift of the Brookes.

== Furness ==
As architect of the Reading Railroad, Frank Furness designed the line's station in Birdsboro (1874, demolished 1967). The Brooke brothers did business with the Reading, and Edward hired Furness to make alterations to his Greek Revival mansion, "Brooke Manor" (1844, altered by Furness circa 1875, demolished 1961).

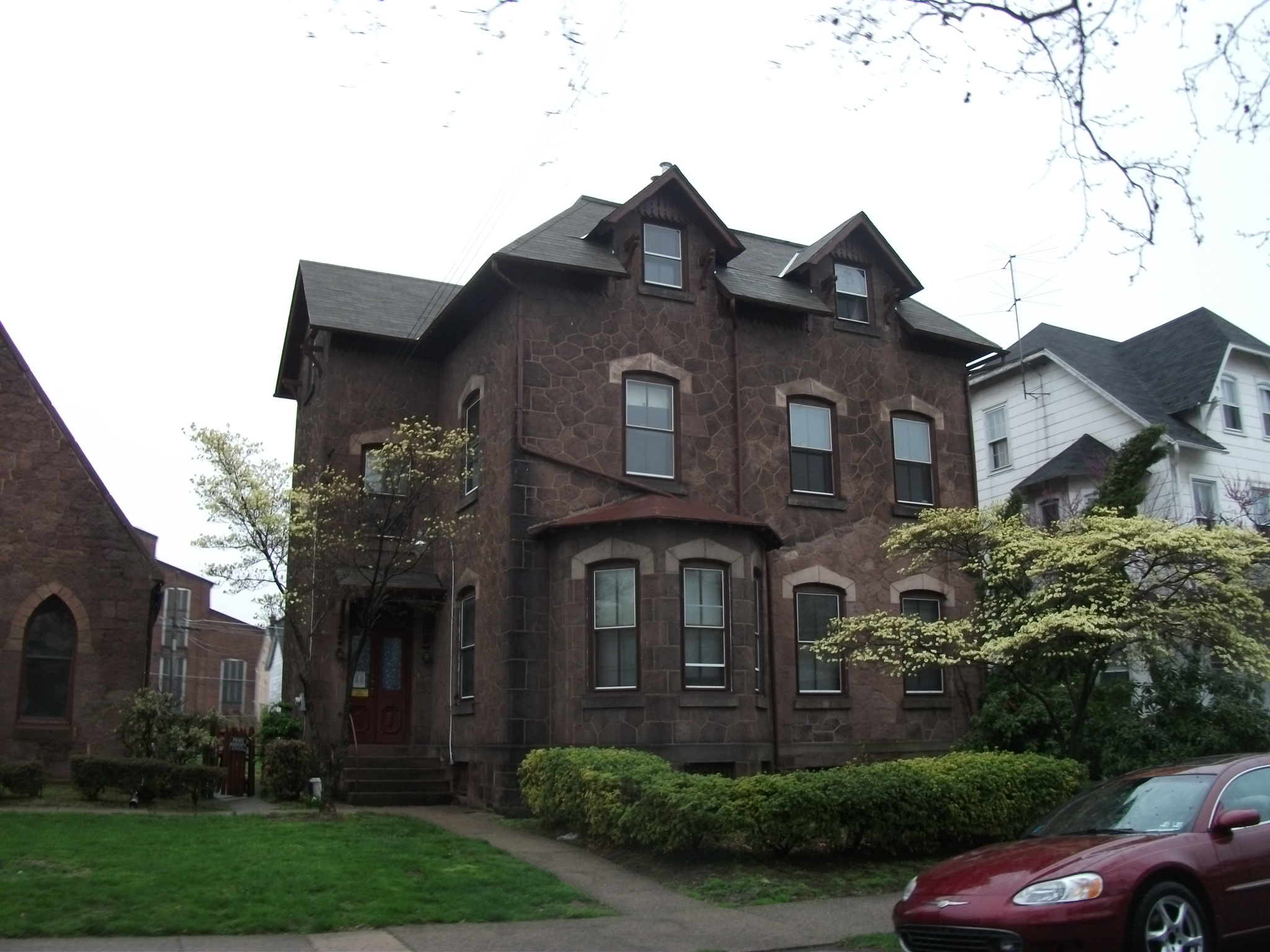
St. Michael's Rectory, from Mill Street. Furness moved the entrance to the side.

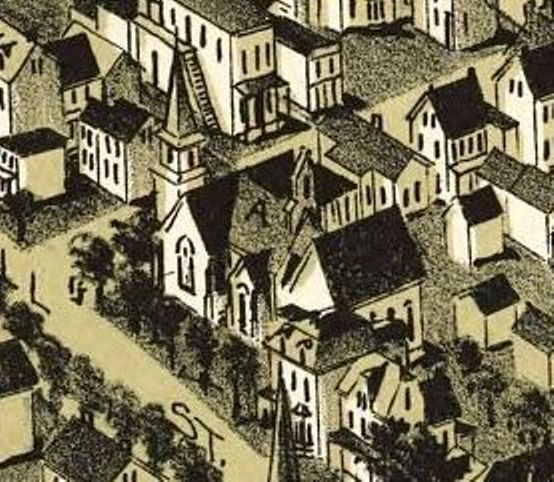
Furness's expansion of the church and alterations to the rectory are visible in this detail from an 1890 panorama.

Design of St. Michael's Rectory (1877–78) is attributed to either George Brooke or Furness, and the brownstone residence became another gift of the Brookes. Later alterations — changing the roof, moving the entrance to a 3-story addition (with bathrooms above), adding a bay window where the original entrance had been — are attributed solely to Furness, and probably were done at the same time that the church was expanded. Furness's alterations are visible in an 1890 panoramic view of Birdsboro.

== 1884-85 expansion ==
Following older brother Edward's death, George hired Furness to expand the church building. Furness lengthened the nave – adding east and west transepts and turning a simple box into a cruciform — and tucked a bell-tower-with-steeple off to one side. The contractor, Levi H. Focht, was a resident of Birdsboro, and had built dozens of Furness-designed stations for the Reading Railroad (including the one in Birdsboro). The church's exterior was clad in brownstone, with a wooden porte cochere built against the west transept (turning it into a carriage entrance), a colored-slate roof, and a large gold-plated cross crowning the steeple.

Furness, son of the Unitarian minister William Henry Furness, experimented with some of the ideas from his contemporaneous First Unitarian Church of Philadelphia (1883–86). Both churches had soaring curved roof trusses, vividly colored walls, and high windows that bathed the sanctuary in natural light. For St. Michael's, Furness chose royal-blue ceilings and Etruscan-red walls accented with metallic-gold trim, a color scheme that he had used to dramatic effect at the Pennsylvania Academy of the Fine Arts. "Furniss" (as the church historian misspelled the architect's name) also designed the church furniture — altar, pews, etc. — possibly fabricated by his frequent collaborator, Daniel Pabst. The blower for the Johnson & Son pipe organ (Op. 572, 1882) was housed in the base of the bell tower, and its pipes were stencilled with stylized flowers in colors that recalled Pennsylvania Dutch folk art.

The total cost of the improvements was in excess of $12,000, a gift of the Brooke family. The expanded church was consecrated on May 31, 1885.

== 1892 expansion ==
The chancel was lengthened by 10 feet and widened by 6 feet in 1892, allowing the installation of choir stalls and moving the altar wall south to the Church Street sidewalk. This work was done by New York designer R. Geissler and contractor Levi H. Focht. At the same time, the Edward Brooke Memorial Window, created by Tiffany Studios in 1887, was removed from the east transept and installed over the altar.

Over the decades, the church was embellished with additional stained-glass windows, including another by Tiffany Studios, and other adornments.

== Decline ==
Following years of decline, the Birdsboro Steel Corporation's plant closed in 1988, a severe economic blow to the town. By the time St. Michael's celebrated its sesquicentennial in 2001, the congregation had dwindled to the point of not being able to sustain a full-time minister. The Episcopal Diocese of Bethlehem, Pennsylvania closed the church in July 2002. It then outraged preservationists in January 2003, by removing the building's stained-glass windows, pews, altars and pipe organ. Availability to these items was supposed to be restricted only to other Episcopal congregations, but, according to George M. Meiser IX, president of the Historical Society of Berks County, some of them were offered for sale on eBay.

The Edward Brooke Memorial Window stood above the altar for 110 years. It is now in the collection of the Smith Museum of Stained Glass Windows in Chicago, Illinois. The pipe organ was cannibalized for parts.

The church property was sold to another congregation in 2005, and is now the New First Baptist Church of Birdsboro.

== Significance ==
George E. Thomas of the University of Pennsylvania, an architectural historian who has spent his career studying Furness, wrote the 1982 nomination for St. Michael's inclusion on the National Register of Historic Places:

"The church represents a major complex of buildings by Furness at the height of his career, when he was moving toward direct expression of materials and construction as the constituent elements of his designs. ...[T]he brilliance of the surviving color scheme of the church interior, which is the only complete, original color scheme from his career ... is important both because it carries Ruskinian color into the 1880s, and for recalling his father's admonition to the American Institute of Architects, in 1872, when he argued that the church architect should make a building that would keep a parishioner awake, if the sermon was dull. That he nobly accomplished. ...Despite the fact that Furness added to and redesigned the existing church buildings, in its current appearance St. Michael's can be regarded as his work."

== See also ==
- National Register of Historic Places listings in Berks County, Pennsylvania
