= Hay Creek (Schuylkill River tributary) =

Coordinates: 40°16′14″N 75°48′03″W

Hay Creek is a 12.8-mile-long (20.6 km) tributary of the Schuylkill River in Berks County, Pennsylvania, in the United States.

Hay Creek flows straight through the heart of Birdsboro and then joins the Schuylkill River. William Bird, whom the town was named after, established a forge on Hay Creek about 1740.

== See also ==
- List of rivers of Pennsylvania
