= Daniel Boone Area School District =

School district in Pennsylvania

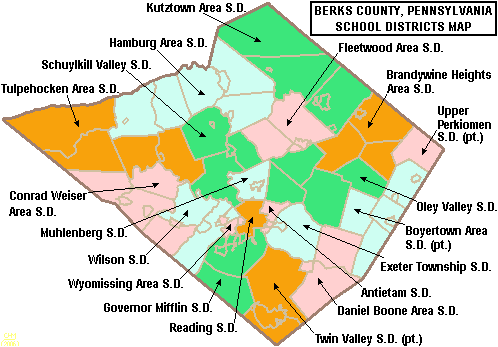

Address
- 501 Chestnut Street Southeastern Berks County Birdsboro, Pennsylvania, Berks County, 19508

District information
- Type: Public

Students and staff
- District mascot: Blazers
- Colors: Carolina blue and white

Other information
- Website: www.dboone.org

The Daniel Boone Area School District covers the Borough of Birdsboro, Amity Township, and Union Township in Berks County, Pennsylvania. The district encompasses approximately 39 square miles (100 km^{2}). According to 2000 federal census data, it served a resident population of 17,384. By 2010, the district's population increased to 21,270 people. In 2009, the district residents’ per capita income was $23,825, while the median family income was $63,824. In the Commonwealth, the median family income was $49,501 and the United States median family income was $49,445, in 2010.

Daniel Boone Area School District operates Daniel Boone Area High School (9-12), Daniel Boone Area Middle School (5-8), Daniel Boone Area Intermediate Center (2-4), and Daniel Boone Area Primary Center (K-1).

== Extra Curriculars ==
The district offers a wide variety of clubs, activities and an extensive sports program.

=== Sports ===
The district funds:

Males

- Baseball - A
- Basketball- AAAA
- Bowling - AAAA
- Cross Country - AAA
- Football - AAA
- Golf - AAA
- Lacrosse - AAAA
- Soccer - AAA
- Tennis - AAA
- Track and Field - AAA
- Volleyball - AAA
- Wrestling - AAA

Females

- Basketball - AAAA
- Bowling - AAAA
- Cheerleading - AAAA
- Cross Country - AAA
- Field Hockey - AAA
- Soccer (Fall) - AAA
- Softball - AAAA
- Girls' Tennis - AAA
- Track and Field - AAA
- Volleyball - AAA

Middle School Extracurricalr

Males

- Cross Country
- gunsmithing
- Soccer
- Track and Field

Females

- Basketball
- Cross Country
- Field Hockey
- Softball
- Track and Field
- Volleyball

According to the Pennsylvania interscholastic Athletics ppl directory July 2013
