= Monocacy Station, Pennsylvania =

Unincorporated community in Pennsylvania, US

- Unincorporated community
- Location within Pennsylvania
- Coordinates: 40°15′42″N 75°46′02″W
- Country: United States
- State: Pennsylvania
- County: Berks
- Township: Amity
- Elevation: 164 ft (50 m)
- Time zone: UTC-5 (Eastern (EST))
  - Summer (DST): UTC-4 (EDT)
- ZIP Code: 19518
- Area codes: 610 and 484
- GNIS feature ID: 2488647

Monocacy Station is an unincorporated community that is located in Amity Township in Berks County, Pennsylvania, United States.

== History and geography ==
This community takes its name from Monocacy Creek, which is a Native American name purported to mean "stream with several big bends".

Monocacy Station is located on North Main Street to the north of the Schuylkill River and east of Birdsboro. Monocacy Station previously had a post office with a ZIP code of 19542; however, this ZIP code was retired in 2016 and the community is now served by the Douglassville ZIP code of 19518.
