= Birdsboro, Pennsylvania =

Borough in Pennsylvania, US

- Borough
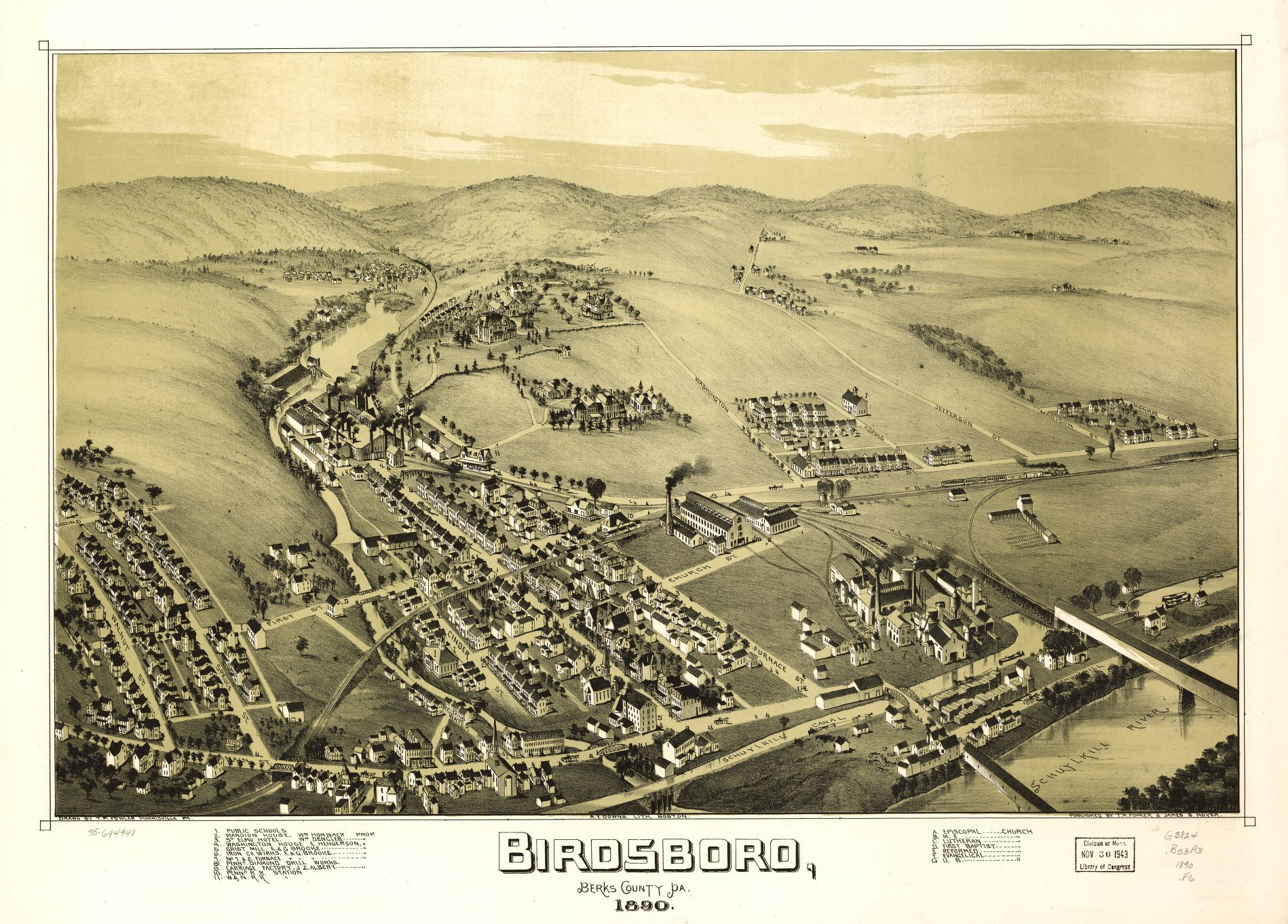
- Birdsboro in 1890

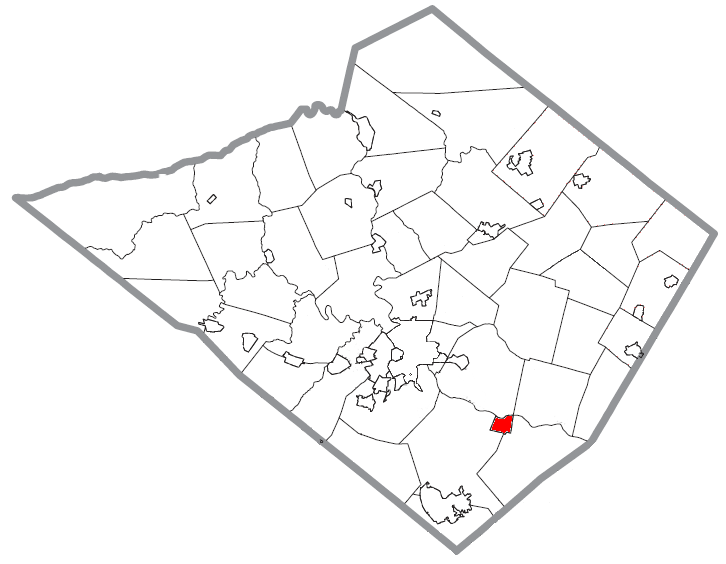
- Location of Birdsboro in Berks County, Pennsylvania

- Location in Pennsylvania and the United States Birdsboro (the United States)
- Coordinates: 40°15′47″N 75°48′28″W
- Country: United States
- State: Pennsylvania
- County: Berks

Area
  - Total: 1.36 sq mi (3.51 km^{2})
  - Land: 1.32 sq mi (3.43 km^{2})
  - Water: 0.031 sq mi (0.08 km^{2})
- Elevation: 207 ft (63 m)

Population (2020)
  - Total: 5,106
  - Density: 3,856.2/sq mi (1,488.88/km^{2})
- Time zone: UTC-5 (EST)
  - Summer (DST): UTC-4 (EDT)
- ZIP Code: 19508
- Area code: 610
- FIPS code: 42-06504
- Website: www.birdsboropa.org

Birdsboro is a borough in Berks County, Pennsylvania, United States. It is located along the Schuylkill River 8 miles (13 km) southeast of Reading. As of the 2020 census, it had a population of 5,106. Birdsboro's economy had historically been rooted in large foundries and machine shops, none of which remain in operation today.

== History ==
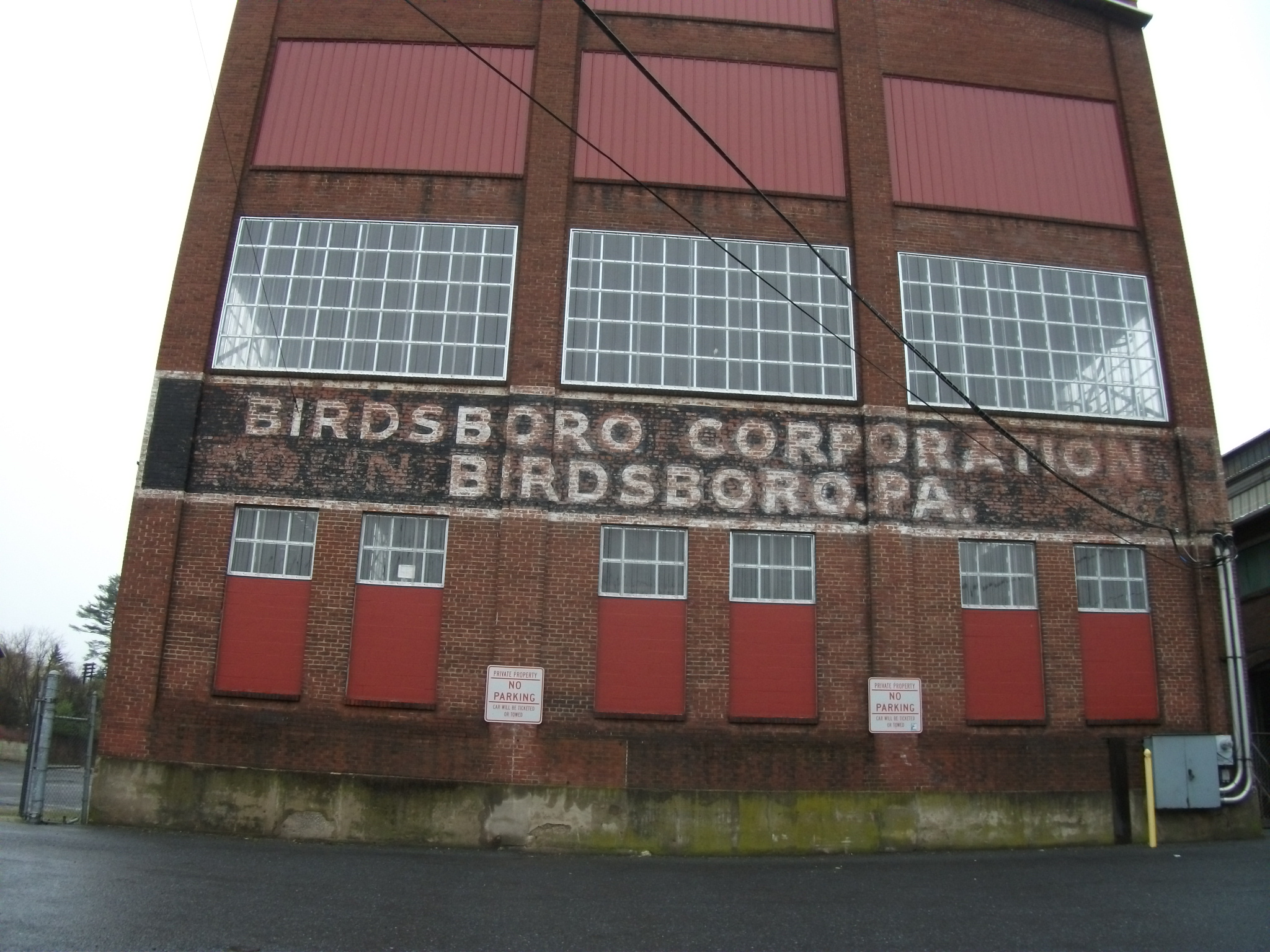
The Birdsboro Corporation, formerly Birdsboro Steel Corporation, steel plant closed in 1988.

Birdsboro was named for ironmaker William Bird, who established a forge on Hay Creek about 1740. His son Marcus founded Hopewell Furnace in 1771, which was the largest domestic producer of iron by the time of the American Revolution. The Schuylkill Canal, running parallel to the river, was completed in 1827. The Philadelphia and Reading Railroad, constructed to haul anthracite coal, was completed in 1843. Edward and George Brooke, descendants of the Birds, established the Birdsboro Iron Foundry Company (1867), which became Birdsboro Steel Company (1905). The principal employer for 120 years, the steel plant closed in 1988, following a lengthy strike.

The borough was created in 1872, from sections of Union and Robeson townships. Its population increased slowly from 2,261 in 1890, to 2,264 in 1900, to 2,930 in 1910. The population was 5,064 at the 2000 census.

Armorcast Corporation built a plant in the borough in 1944, which manufactured tanks for World War II and the Korean War. The plant closed in 1988.

Suburban housing developments such as Mansion Heights, built on the hills overlooking the valley in the 1980s and 1990s, increased the borough's population markedly. Still, the local Episcopal church closed in 2002, and the Roman Catholic parish built a new church and school outside the borough, in Douglassville, in 2005.

In 1987, torrential rains over a period of several days caused Hay Creek to flood parts of Pennsylvania Route 82, which ran through the borough at the time, and damaged the five bridges between Rock Hollow Road and Douglas Street. The bridge upstream from Douglas Street was repaired. However, after many years of discussion between local and state officials, the decision was finally made in 2004 that the remaining upstream bridges should not be rebuilt. For years, the area had been used as an informal walking trail. The former road connecting Birdsboro to Scarlet's Mill is now used formally as a nature trail. In December 2008, the PA 82 designation was removed from this stretch of road. This area is now part of Hopewell Big Woods, which allows public access for hiking, fishing, hunting and other outdoor activities.

St. Michael's Protestant Episcopal Church, Parish House and Rectory was listed on the National Register of Historic Places in 1982.

== Geography ==
Birdsboro is located in southern Berks County at 40°15′47″N 75°48′28″W (40.263142, -75.807832). Its northern border is the Schuylkill River, with Exeter Township to the north. Union Township is to the east, and Robeson Township is to the south and west.

According to the U.S. Census Bureau, Birdsboro has a total area of 1.37 square miles (3.54 km^{2}), of which 1.34 square miles (3.46 km^{2}) is land and 0.03 square miles (0.08 km^{2}), or 2.27%, is water. Birdsboro is located on the northern edge of the Hopewell Big Woods, the largest area of contiguous forest in southeastern Pennsylvania.

=== Climate ===
The climate in this area is characterized by hot, humid summers and generally mild to cool winters. According to the Köppen Climate Classification system, Birdsboro has a humid subtropical climate, abbreviated "Cfa" on climate maps.

== Demographics ==
As of the 2000 census, 5,064 people, 1,854 households, and 1,379 families resided in the borough. The population density was 3,646.2 inhabitants per square mile (1,407.8/km^{2}). There were 1,927 housing units at an average density of 1,387.5 per square mile (535.7/km^{2}). The racial makeup of the borough was 96.86% White, 1.05% African American, 0.12% Native American, 0.36% Asian, 0.06% Pacific Islander, 0.63% from other races, and 0.93% from two or more races. Hispanic or Latino of any race were 1.24% of the population.

Historical population
Census	Pop.	Note	%±
1880	1,705		—
1890	2,261		32.6%
1900	2,264		0.1%
1910	2,930		29.4%
1920	3,290		12.3%
1930	3,542		7.7%
1940	3,313		−6.5%
1950	3,158		−4.7%
1960	3,025		−4.2%
1970	3,196		5.7%
1980	3,481		8.9%
1990	4,222		21.3%
2000	5,064		19.9%
2010	5,163		2.0%
2020	5,106		−1.1%

There were 1,854 households, out of which 41.1% had children under the age of 18 living with them, 60.9% were married couples living together, 8.8% had a female householder with no husband present, and 25.6% were non-families. A total of 21.5% of all households were made up of individuals, and 9.5% had someone living alone who was 65 years of age or older. The average household size was 2.73, and the average family size was 3.18.

The population was diverse in the borough, with 29.2% under the age of 18, 6.6% from 18 to 24, 33.4% from 25 to 44, 20.0% from 45 to 64, and 10.8% aged 65 years or older. The median age was 35 years. For every 100 females, there were 98.8 males. For every 100 females age 18 and over, there were 96.4 males.

The median income for a household in the borough was $53,932, and the median income for a family was $58,542. Males had a median income of $39,875 versus $26,705 for females. The per capita income for the borough was $20,890. About 1.4% of families and 2.7% of the population were below the poverty line, including 2.1% of those under age 18 and none of those age 65 or over.

== Local education ==
Children in the borough of Birdsboro attend the public schools in the Daniel Boone Area School District. Students in grades K-2 attend the Daniel Boone Area Primary Center; grades 3-5 attend the Daniel Boone Area Intermediate Center; grades 6-8 attend the Daniel Boone Area Middle School; and grades 9-12 attend the Daniel Boone Area High School. Children in grades K-8 also have the option of attending Immaculate Conception Academy, a Catholic school in nearby Douglassville.

The Robeson Elementary School of the Twin Valley School District has a Birdsboro postal address, but it is in Robeson Township and does not have Birdsboro in its attendance zone.

== Transportation ==
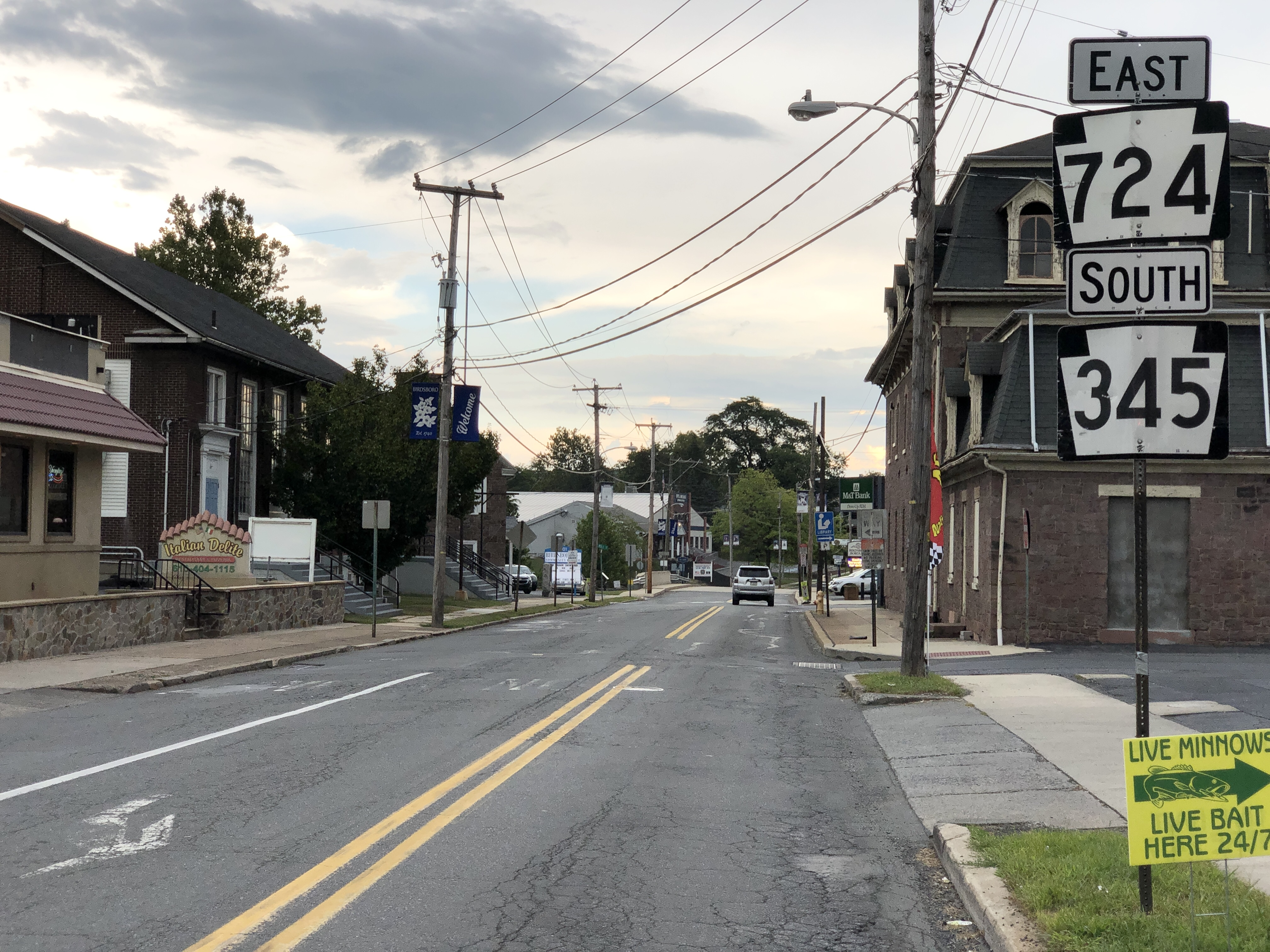
PA 345 southbound and PA 724 eastbound in Birdsboro

As of 2020, there were 18.29 miles (29.43 km) of public roads in Birdsboro, of which 2.26 miles (3.64 km) were maintained by the Pennsylvania Department of Transportation (PennDOT) and 16.03 miles (25.80 km) were maintained by the borough.

Pennsylvania Route 724 is Birdsboro's Main Street, leading west to Shillington near Reading and east to South Pottstown. Pennsylvania Route 345 leaves north from the center of town and crosses the Schuylkill River to U.S. Route 422 in Baumstown. PA 345 leads south into French Creek State Park and Hopewell Furnace National Historic Site.

== Notable people ==
- Daniel Boone, pioneer and frontiersman
- Lucile Carter, Titanic survivor
- Chad Hurley, YouTube founder
- Richie Kotzen, guitarist, The Winery Dogs, Mr. Big, and Poison

== Historic Birdsboro ==
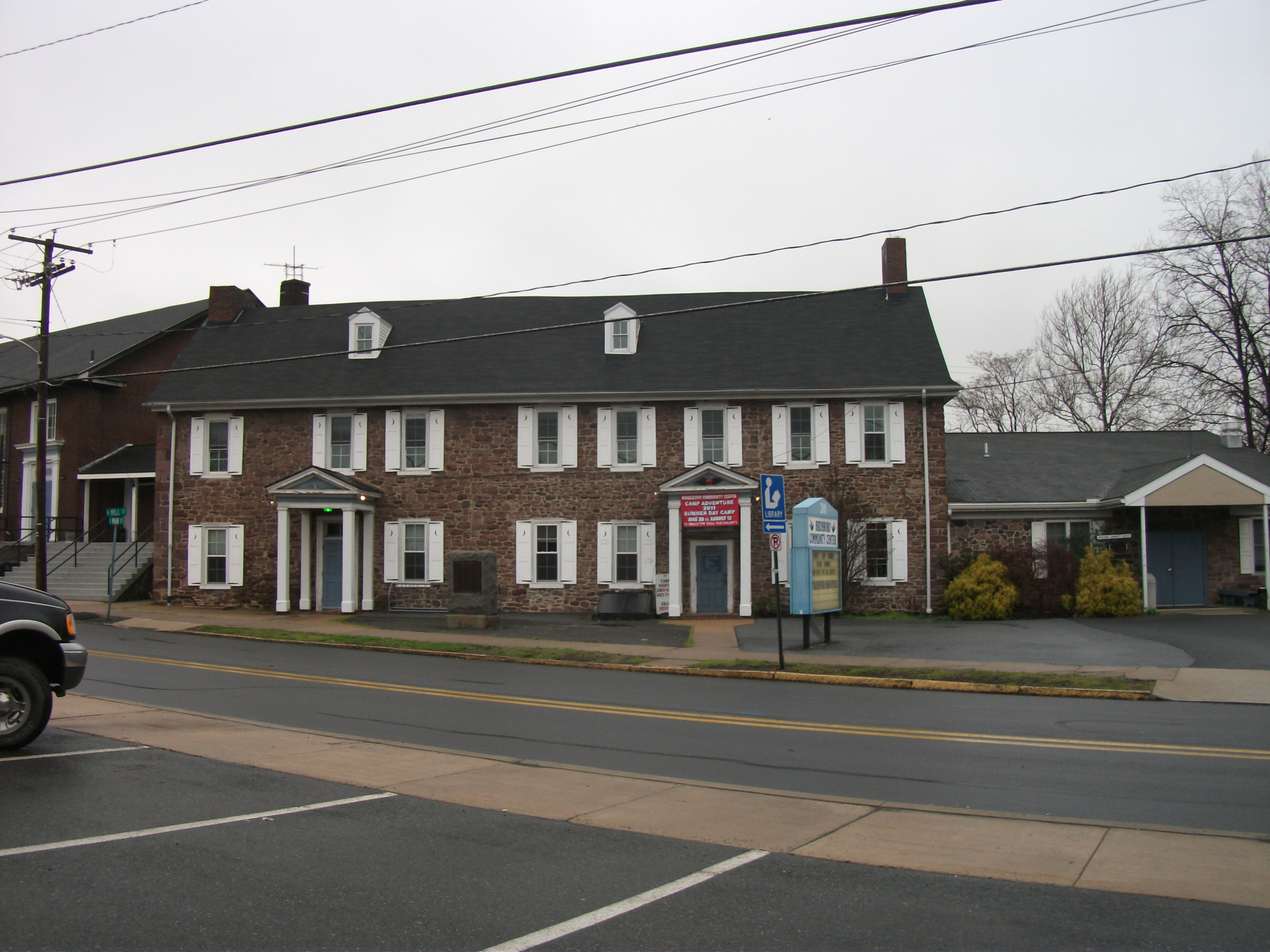
William Bird Mansion (1751), now Birdsboro Community Center.

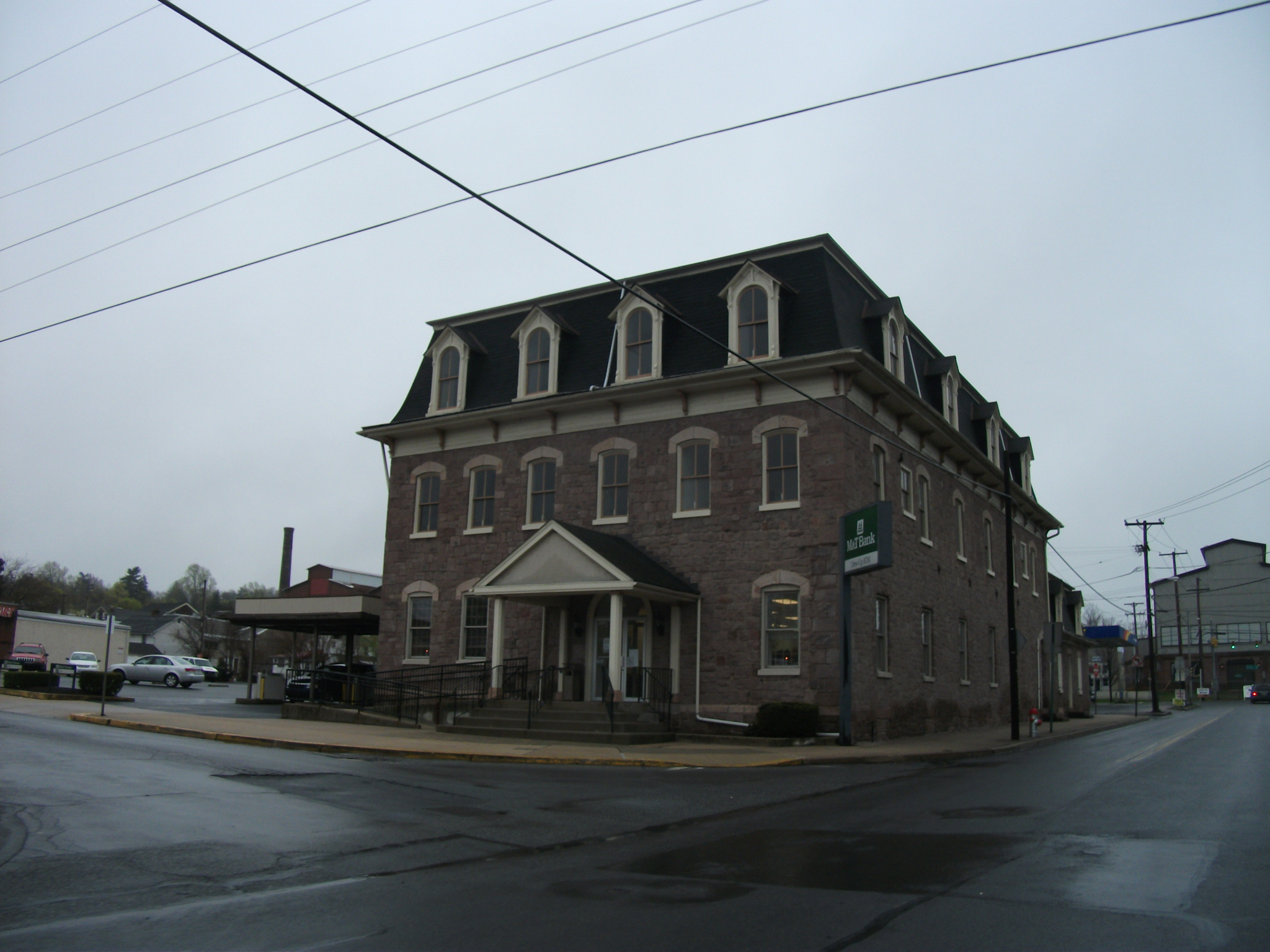
Brooke Hall (c. 1875), now a branch of M&T Bank.

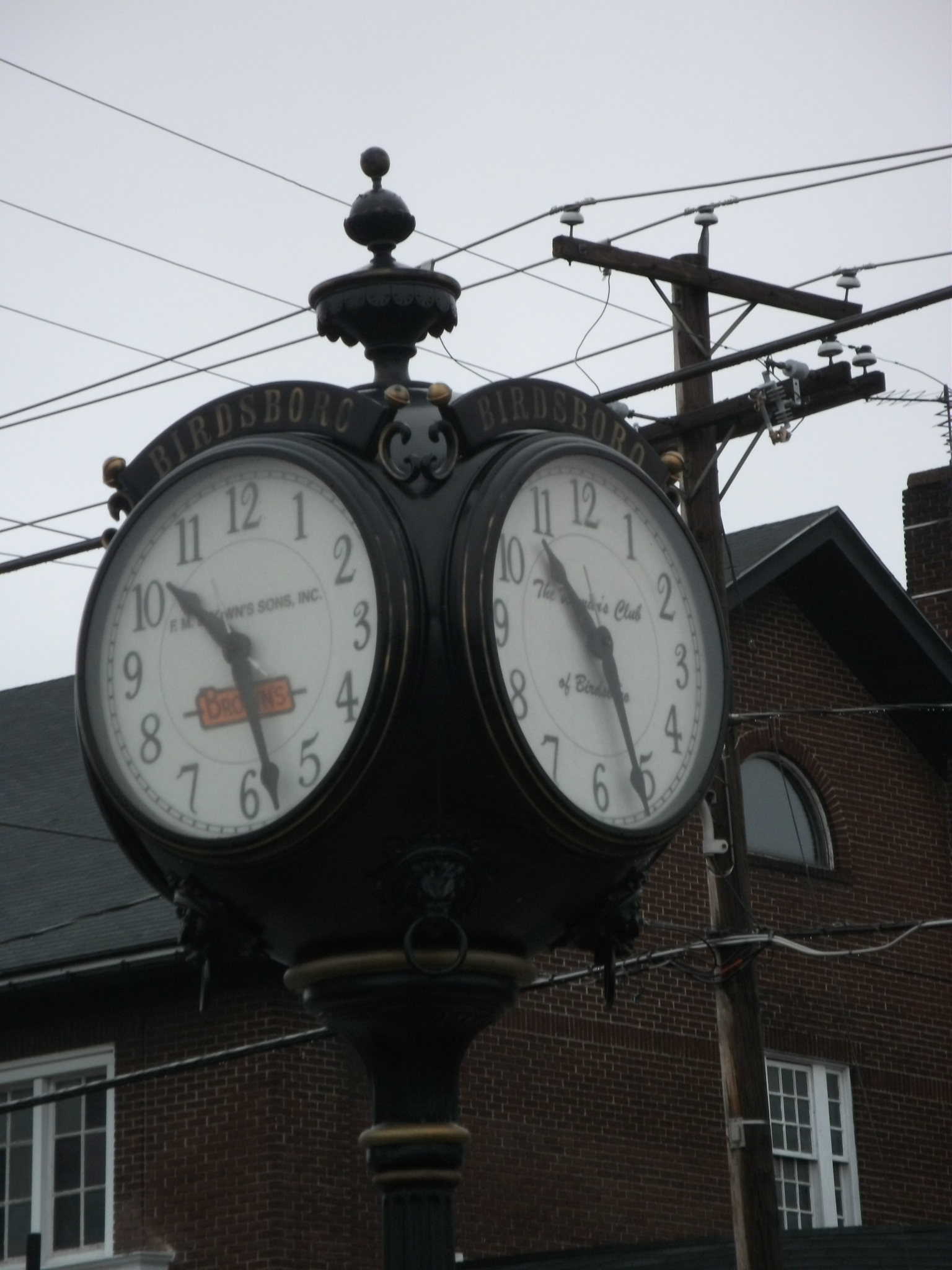
Town clock, East Main & Mill Streets.

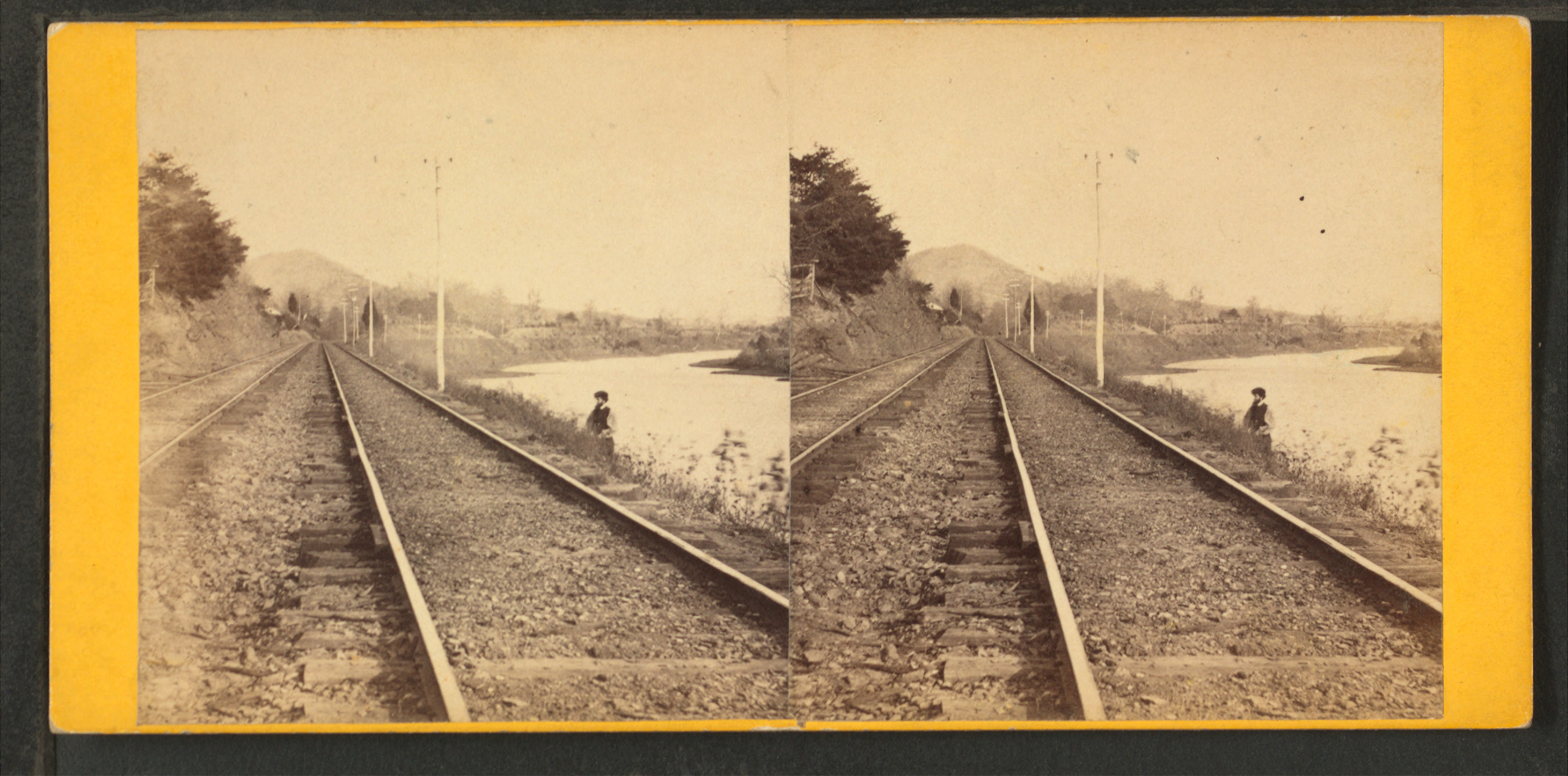
Reading Railroad below Birdsboro, circa 1865–85.

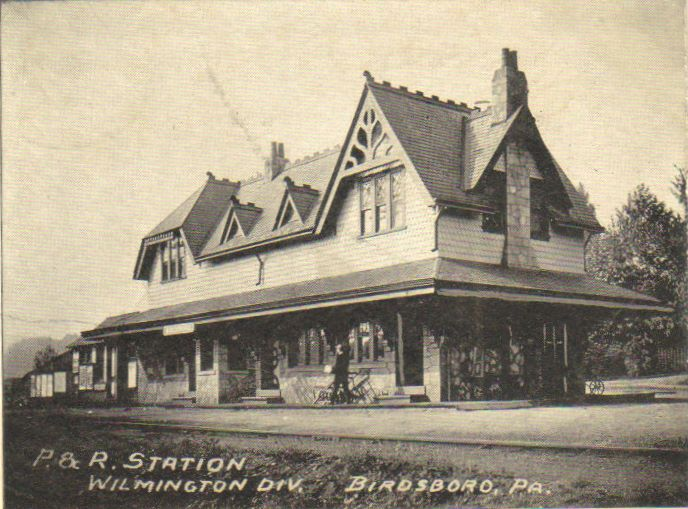
Philadelphia & Reading Railroad Station (c. 1875, demolished 1963), Frank Furness, architect.

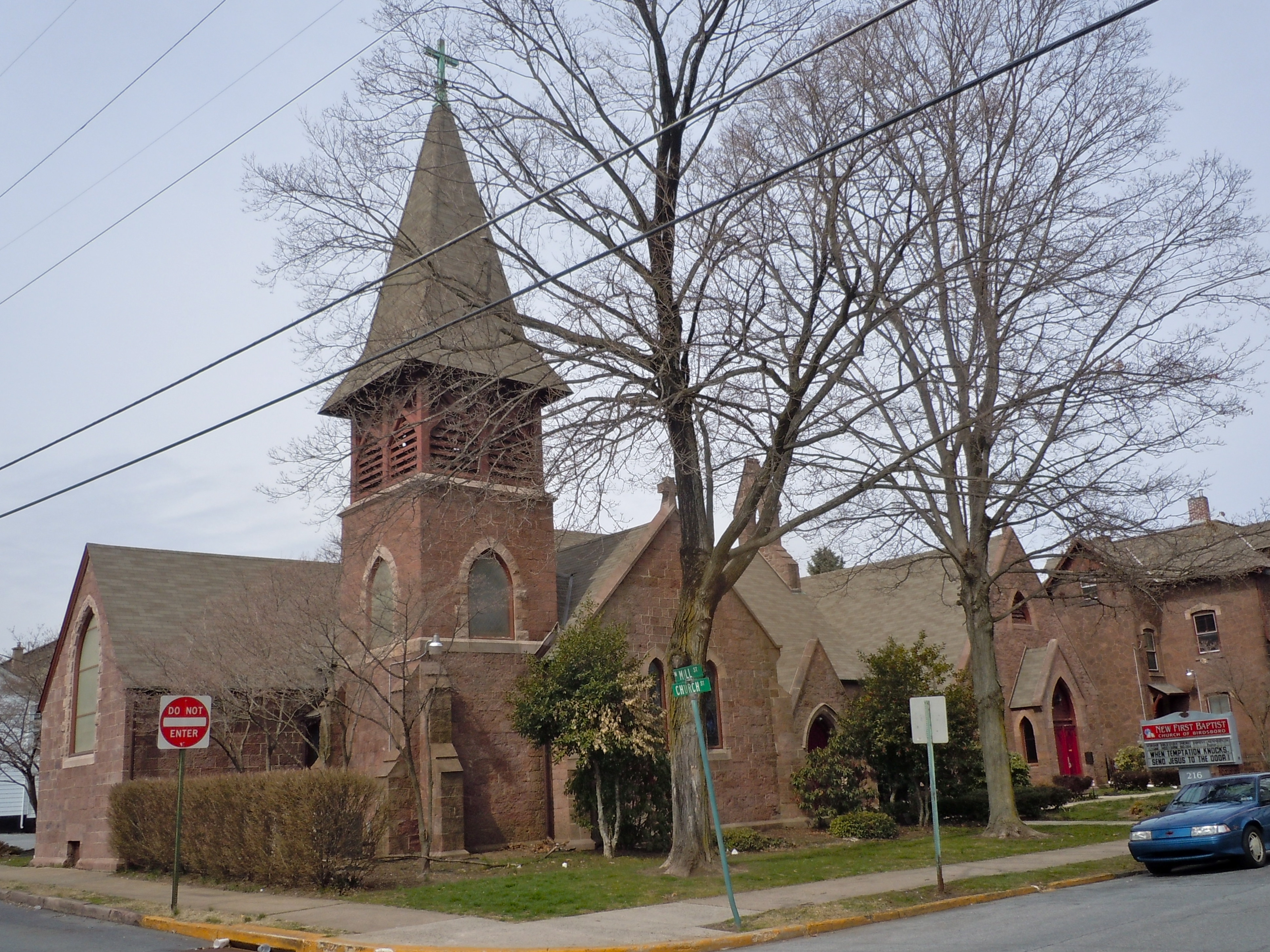
St. Michael's Episcopal Church (1884–85), Frank Furness, architect; National Register of Historic Places. Now the New First Baptist Church of Birdsboro.

== See also ==
- Birdsboro station (Pennsylvania Railroad)
- Birdsboro station (Reading Railroad)
- Brooke Mansion (Birdsboro, Pennsylvania)
- Daniel Boone Homestead
- French Creek State Park
- Hopewell Furnace National Historic Site
- St. Michael's Episcopal Church (Birdsboro, Pennsylvania)
