= Franklin Street station (Pennsylvania) =

Redeveloped former station in Reading

Franklin Street
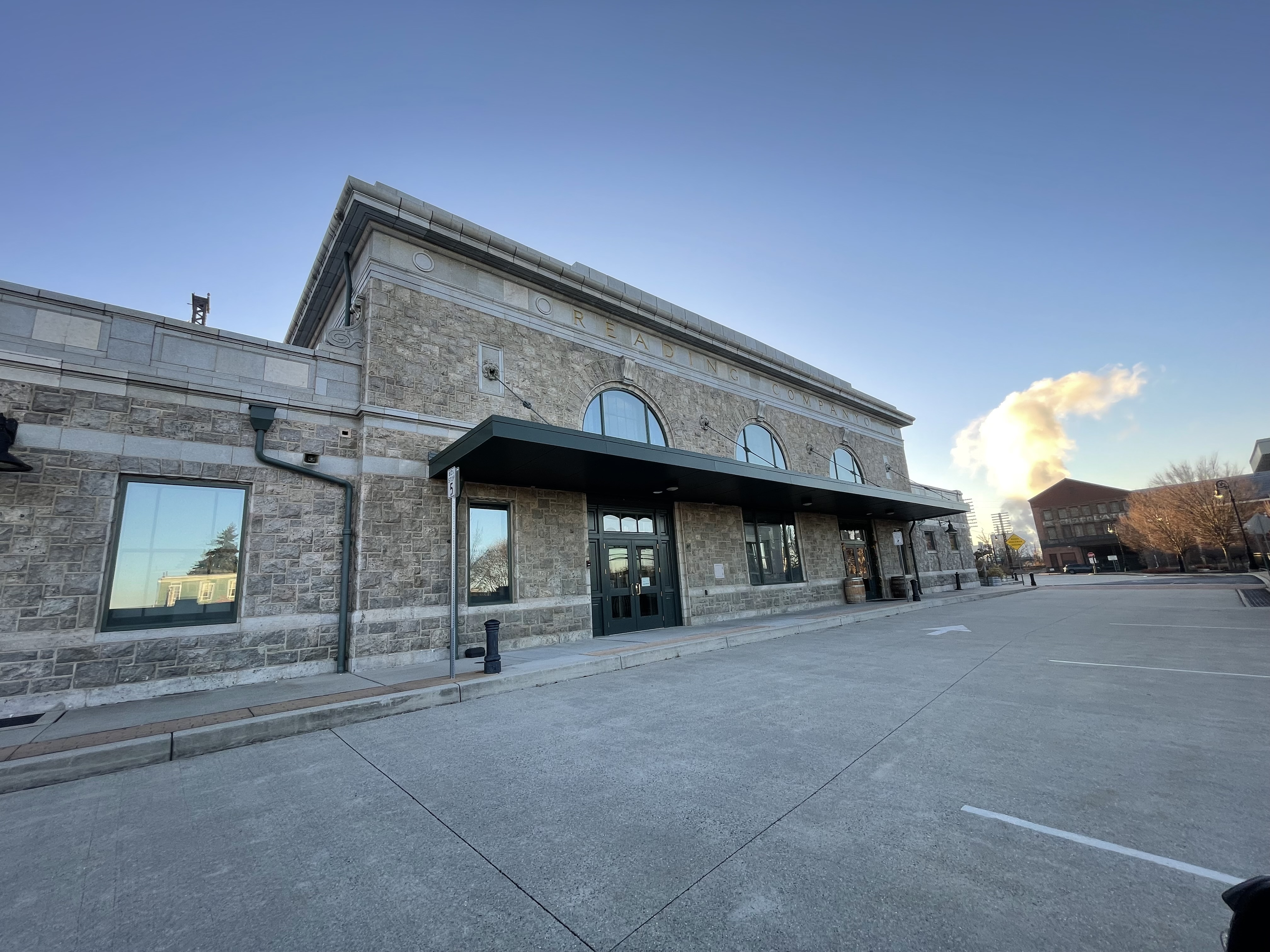
- Franklin Street building front, now a restaurant in 2024

General information
- Location: Franklin Street and 7th Street; Reading, Pennsylvania, U.S.
- Coordinates: 40.3328802°N 75.9242991°W
- System: BARTA bus terminal Former SEPTA regional rail station
- Owner: BARTA
- Platforms: 2 side platform
- Tracks: 2
- Connections: BARTA buses: All at the BARTA Transportation Center

Construction
- Structure type: Stone
- Parking: Yes
- Accessible: Yes

History
- Closed: June 30, 1981
- Rebuilt: February 8, 1929–February 25, 1930; 2013

Former services
Preceding station	SEPTA	Following station
Leesport toward Pottsville	Pottsville Line	Birdsboro toward Reading Terminal
Preceding station	Reading Railroad	Following station
Reading toward Pottsville	Main Line	Neversink toward Philadelphia
Reading Terminus	Wilmington and Northern Branch	Lorane toward Wilmington
Location

Franklin Street station is a former railroad and bus station in Reading, Pennsylvania. It currently is owned by Berks Area Regional Transportation Authority (BARTA) and hosts a brewpub restaurant operated by Saucony Creek Brewing Company.

Built by the Reading Railroad and dedicated on February 25, 1930, Franklin Street Station later served the SEPTA diesel service extending the Manayunk/Norristown Line to Pottsville. It closed when SEPTA cancelled the diesel service in 1981. BARTA acquired the building on December 14, 2005, and converted it into a bus depot in May 2013.

== History ==
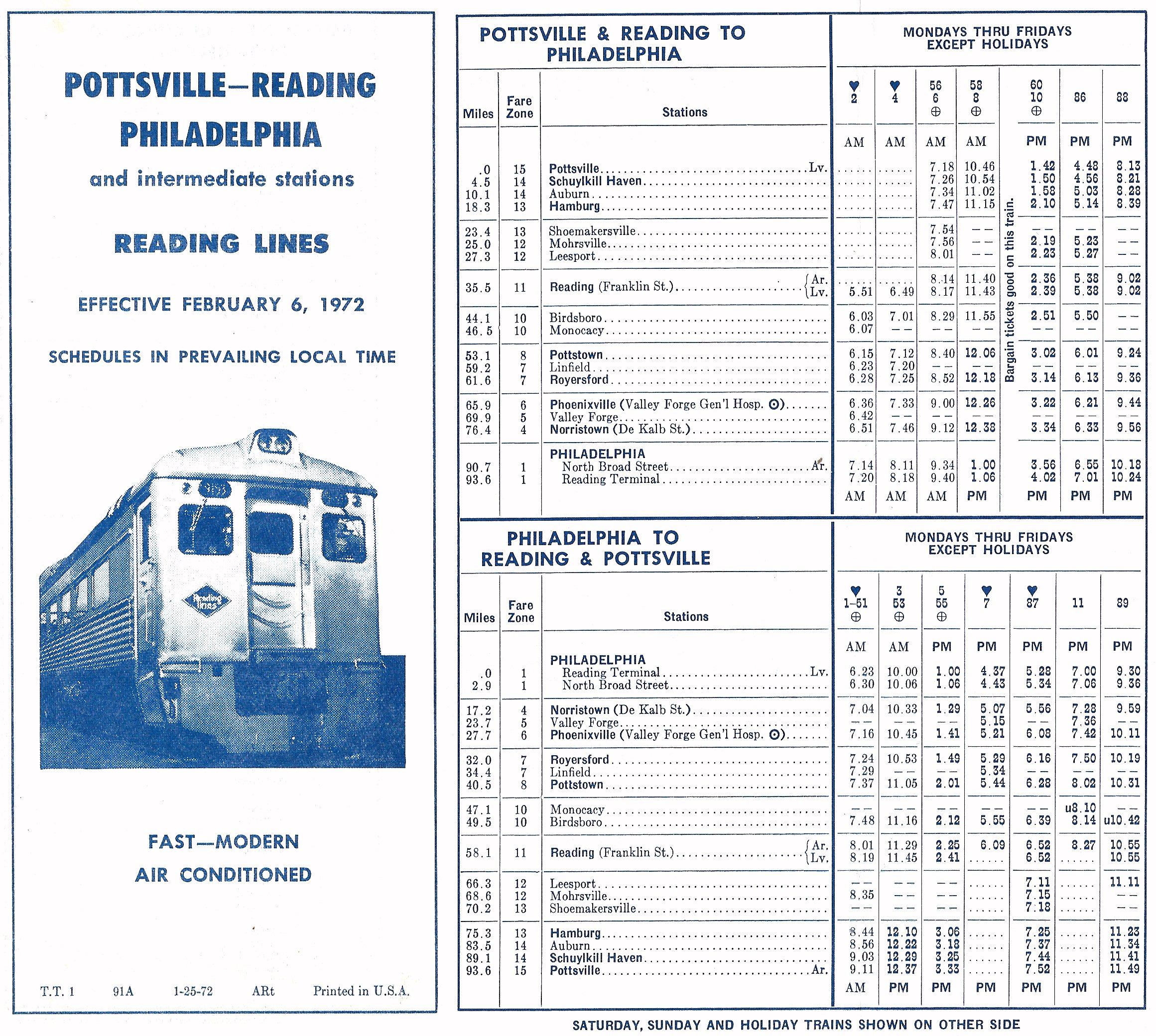
Passenger Timetable (eff. 1972-02-06) of a predecessor to SEPTA diesel service on Reading Lines between Pottsville, Penn. via Reading, Penn. to Philadelphia

The Franklin Street station served the railroad from 1930 until 1981 when SEPTA diesel service ceased operations. Medium distance trains serving the station included the King Coal and Schuykill. From 1981 until 2013, the building sat vacant until BARTA acquired and refurbished the building for bus services. The plan was to alleviate overcrowded services at the BARTA Transportation Center located about a block away, as well as make an effort to preserve the historic station. Grants from federal, state and local sources funded the acquisition and rehabilitation costs. The purpose for the acquisition was to create a multi-use complex in which the rehabilitation/renovation of the existing Franklin Street Station building and site was an integral component of the overall development of a transportation facility in the area. Between September 2013 and January 2014 BARTA bus service to Lebanon was operated from the Station. Due to low ridership, the bus service was discontinued.

In July 2017, the station was used for a multimedia art exhibition entitled "This is Reading".

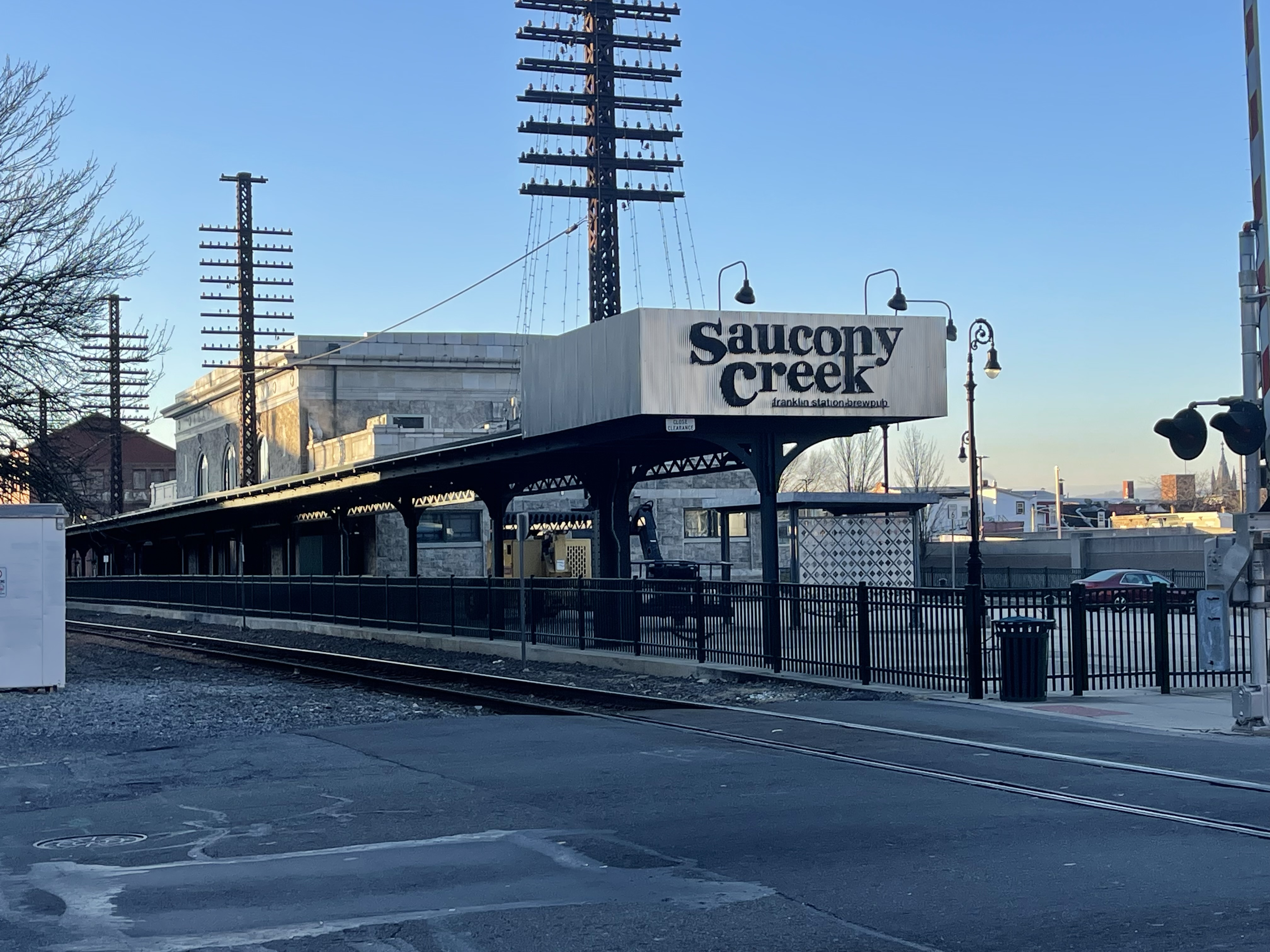
Station platform with Saucony Creek Brewery shown as current tenant of building as of 2024

In June 2018, Saucony Creek Brewing Company leased the facility and opened a brewpub restaurant in July 2019.

There is a proposal to return SEPTA Regional Rail service to the station by way of an extension of the Manayunk/Norristown Line, providing passenger train service from Reading to Philadelphia. In 2020, the Pennsylvania Department of Transportation conducted a feasibility study on bringing passenger train service to Reading via Amtrak.
