= Reading Depot =

Reading
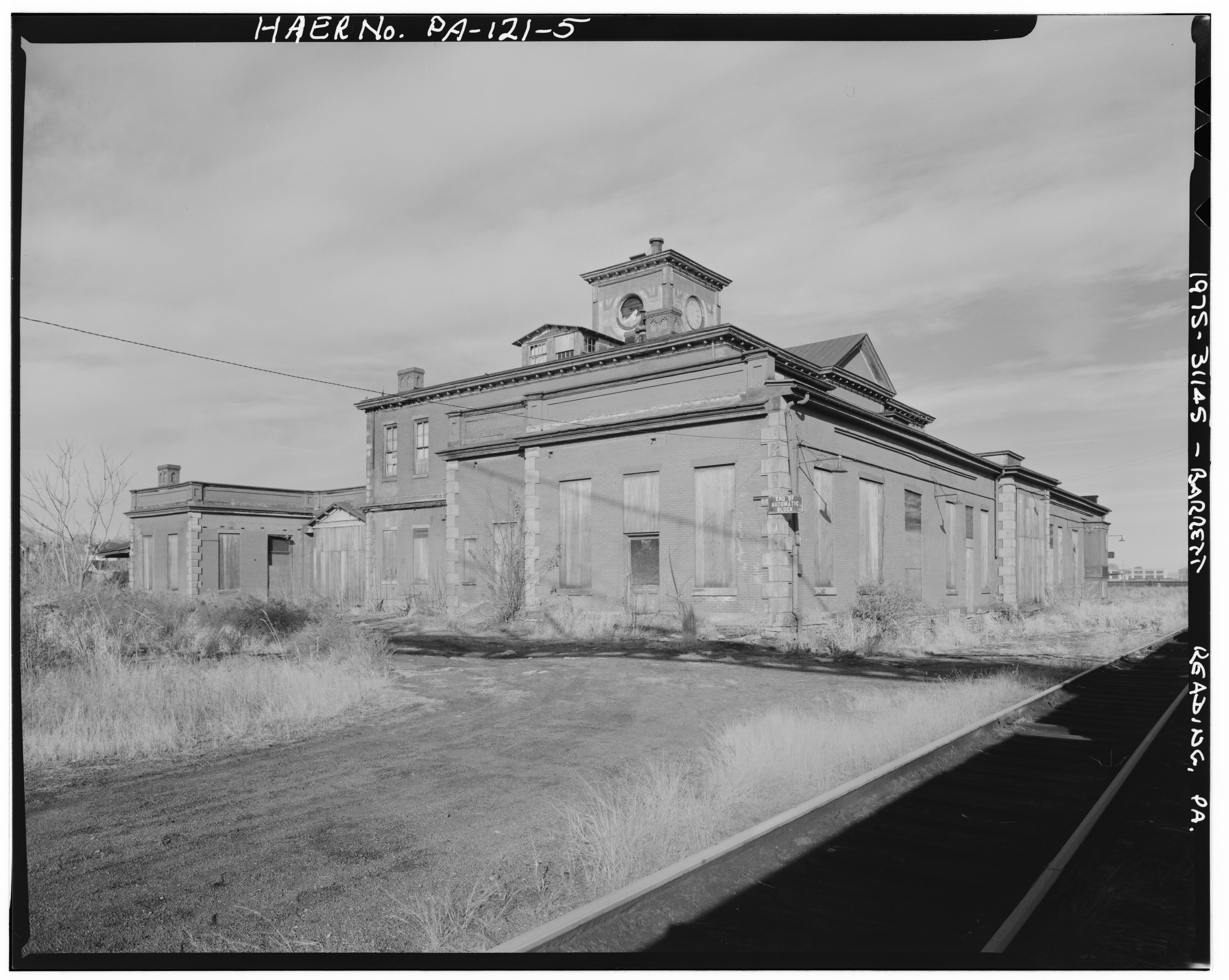
- The abandoned station in 1975

General information
- Location: Woodward Street and 6th Street; Reading, Pennsylvania
- Coordinates: 40.3427134°N 75.9257000°W
- Platforms: triangle platform

Construction
- Structure type: station platform

History
- Opened: 1874
- Closed: March 16, 1969

Former services
Preceding station	Reading Railroad	Following station
Tuckerton toward Pottsville	Main Line	Franklin Street toward Philadelphia
Terminus	Wilmington and Northern Branch	Franklin Street toward Wilmington
through to Harrisburg	East Pennsylvania Railroad	Temple toward Allentown
Wyomissing toward Harrisburg	Lebanon Valley Branch	through to Allentown
Sinking Spring toward Columbia or Lancaster	Reading and Columbia Railroad	Terminus
Terminus	Schyulkill and Lehigh Railroad	Muhlenberg toward Slatington
Location

Reading Depot, commonly referred to as Reading outer station, was a train station in Reading, Pennsylvania, that served as a major hub between Philadelphia and Williamsport, Pennsylvania. Built in 1874, the station closed on March 16, 1969; this was following the discontinuance of the last medium distance route to pass through the city, the Reading Railway's Queen of the Valley (Harrisburg–Jersey City). It was destroyed by fire on February 20, 1978.

The station was one of two in Reading on the Reading, the other being Franklin Street station.
