= Reading Belt Branch =

Railway line in Pennsylvania

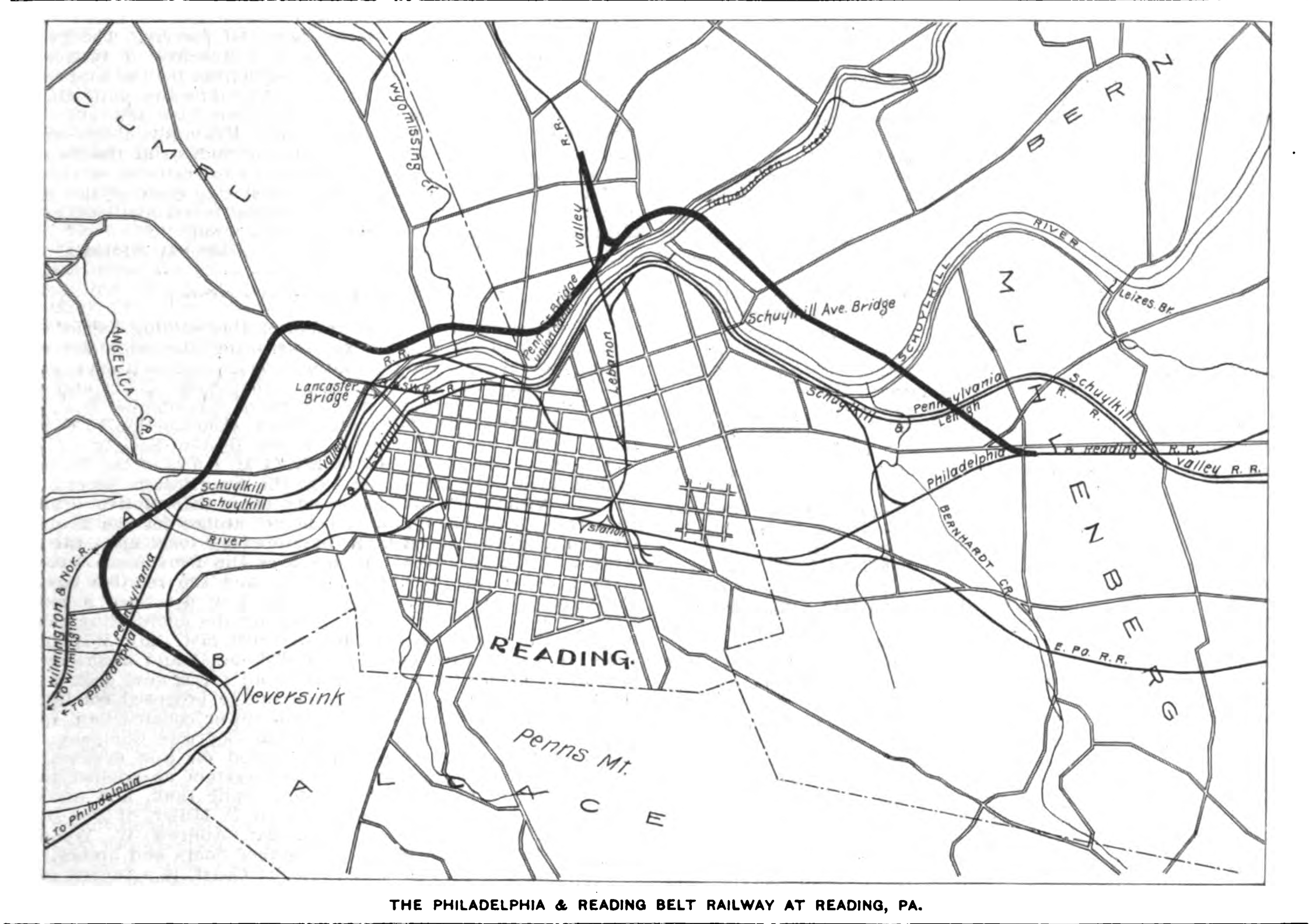
- Map showing the new part of the Reading Belt Branch from north Reading to Cumru Junction

Overview
- Owner: Norfolk Southern Railway

History
- Opened: October 27, 1902

Technical
- Line length: 18.8 mi (30.3 km)
- Track gauge: 1,435 mm (4 ft 8 1/2 in) standard gauge

The Reading Belt Branch is a railway line in Berks County, Pennsylvania. It runs 18.8 miles (30.3 km) from the north end of Reading, Pennsylvania, to Birdsboro, Pennsylvania. It was built by the Philadelphia and Reading Railway in 1902 to allow long, heavy coal trains to bypass downtown Reading. Today, it is part of the Harrisburg Line of the Norfolk Southern Railway.

== History ==
At the turn of the 20th century, Reading, Pennsylvania, was an important hub for the Philadelphia and Reading Railway. Lines approached from the west (Lebanon Valley Branch), east (East Pennsylvania Branch), north (Main Line), and south (Main Line, and the Wilmington and Northern Branch). Most of this traffic was funneled over the double-track Main Line through downtown Reading, blocking numerous grade crossings.

The P&R decided to build a new route to the west of the city to reduce through traffic. The line was a mix of new construction and re-purposing of existing routes. First, 7.4 miles (11.9 km) of new track would be built, starting from the Main Line north of the city and following the west bank of the Schuylkill River. A connection was built with the east–west Lebanon Valley Branch at Lebanon Valley Junction and Wyomissing Junction. At Cumru Junction, south of Reading, the new construction met the Wilmington and Northern Branch, and a 1.3-mile (2.1 km) connection was built to the Main Line at Klapperthal Junction. Finally, the northern end of the Wilmington and Northern Branch between Cumru Junction and Birdsboro, Pennsylvania, was incorporated into the Reading Belt Branch.

The P&R incorporated the Reading Belt Railroad on April 9, 1900, to build the new portions of the line. The line was completed in May 1902, but the coal strike of 1902 delayed its opening until October 27, 1902. The P&R leased the Reading Belt Railroad on July 1, 1902. The Reading Belt Railroad was one of twelve Reading properties merged at the end of 1923 to create the new Reading Company. The line was further extended in 1957 when the Reading built the Blandon Low Grade east from the Main Line to the East Pennsylvania Branch, bypassing Temple Hill on the latter.

With the Reading Company's final bankruptcy in 1976, the Reading Belt Branch was conveyed to Conrail. (Note: At the time of the Reading's bankruptcy, the Reading Company owned the entirety of the line except for the 7.1 miles (11.4 km) between Cumru Junction and Birdsboro, which was still owned (on paper) by the leased Wilmington and Northern Railroad.) Today, the line is part of the Norfolk Southern Railway's Harrisburg Line, which combines the old Lebanon Valley Branch and the Reading–Philadelphia portion of the Reading Main Line.
