= Lebanon Valley Railroad =

Railway company in Pennsylvania

Overview
- Dates of operation: 1850–1858
- Successor: Philadelphia and Reading Railroad

Technical
- Track gauge: 4 ft 8 1/2 in (1,435 mm)
- Length: 55 miles (89 km)

The Lebanon Valley Railroad was a railway company in the United States. Its company leaders oversaw the construction of the Lebanon Valley Branch between the cities of Harrisburg and Reading, Pennsylvania, which opened on January 18, 1858.

== History ==
This company and its line were acquired by the Philadelphia and Reading Railroad, a predecessor of the Reading Company, on March 20, 1858, which put the company in direct competition with the Pennsylvania Railroad for the Philadelphia to Harrisburg route.

The line now belongs to Norfolk Southern Railway and is part of its Harrisburg Line which runs between Harrisburg and Philadelphia.

== Passenger service ==
Up until the 1960s, this railroad line was the foundation of passenger train operations between Harrisburg and Jersey City, yet bypassing Philadelphia. The most famous train to operate on this line was the "Queen of the Valley."

Intermediate stations included Lebanon, Reading, Allentown, Bethlehem, Easton, Bound Brook and Bayonne.
