= Bethlehem station =

Bethlehem station could refer to:

- Bethlehem Union Station in Bethlehem, Pennsylvania
- Bethlehem station (Central Railroad of New Jersey) in Bethlehem, Pennsylvania
