= Wilmington and Northern Railroad =

Railway company in Pennsylvania and Delaware

Overview
- Stations called at: Main Line: Reading, Gibraltar Station, Brirdsboro, Scarlet's Mill, Geigertown Station, Cold Run, Joanna Heights, Joanna, Kenneys, Elverson/Waynesburg Junction, Conestoga, Isabella, Fontaine, Suplee, Leedale, Brandamore, Cedar Knoll, Wagontown, Sioucsa, Coatesville, Modena, Mortenville, Laurel, Embreeville, Glenhall, Northbrook, Wawaset, Lenape (Sager's Station), Pocopson, Chadds' Ford, Brookfield, Cossart, Granogin, Guyencort, Winterthur, Montchanin, Greenville, Dupont Station, Silverbrook, Elsmere Junction, Wilmington French Creek Branch: Warwick, St. Peters
- Parent company: Reading Company
- Headquarters: Coatesville, PA (1877-1881), Wilmington, DE (1881-1976)
- Key people: Henry A. du Pont
- Locale: Delaware, Pennsylvania
- Dates of operation: 1877–1976
- Predecessor: Wilmington and Reading Railroad
- Successor: Conrail

Technical
- Track gauge: 4 ft 8 1/2 in (1,435 mm) standard gauge
- Electrification: No
- Length: 90.63 miles (145.85 km)

The Wilmington and Northern Railroad was a regional railroad in the northeastern United States that operated between Wilmington, Delaware, and Reading, Pennsylvania from 1877 to 1976. It became part of the Reading Railroad system in 1898, became a paper railroad under their control in 1900 and went bankrupt with it in 1971. It still exists on paper as a subsidiary of Reading International, Inc.

The line originated with the Wilmington and Reading Railroad, which constructed the main route from Wilmington to Birdsboro, Pennsylvania, between 1869 and 1871. An extension to High's Junction (in South Reading next to High's Hill) was completed in 1874, where it connected to the Berks County Railroad for access into Reading. After the Berks County Railroad was foreclosed and reorganized under the control of the Philadelphia and Reading Rail Road (“Reading”), the Wilmington and Reading also fell into financial distress and was foreclosed in 1876. It was reorganized in 1877 as the Wilmington and Northern Railroad.

Following its reorganization, the Wilmington and Northern operated in close affiliation with the Reading but maintained separate management until 1898, when the Reading acquired a controlling interest and integrated it into its system. The segment from Wilmington to Birdsboro became the Wilmington and Northern Branch, while the northern extension was incorporated into the Reading Belt Line. Despite this integration, the Wilmington and Northern continued to exist nominally as a corporate entity within the Reading system.

In the modern era, the line was gradually dismantled. The portion north of Modena, Pennsylvania, was transferred to Conrail in 1976, while the southern segment was retained by the Wilmington and Northern and later leased or sold in sections between 1981 and 2005.

== First predecessors and construction ==
The first predecessor of the Wilmington and Northern to be organized was the Wilmington and Brandywine Railroad, chartered in Delaware on March 5, 1861. It was to build from the Christina River at or near Wilmington to the state line in the direction of Parkesburg, Pennsylvania, with the power to consolidate with a connecting railroad in Pennsylvania from Parkesburg, Coatesville, or Downingtown. It was permitted to build branches, but the main line and branches were not to come nearer than 0.5 miles (0.80 km) to any of the DuPont powder works. On 5 February 1865, the Wilmington and Brandywine changed its name to the Delaware and Pennsylvania State Line Railroad.

The Berks and Chester Railroad was incorporated on April 20, 1864, and was authorized to build from Birdsboro (in Berks County, Pennsylvania) to a connection with any railroad in Chester County, Pennsylvania. A charter supplement on March 13, 1866, allowed the Berks and Chester to connect to and merge with the Delaware and Pennsylvania State Line.

The two were consolidated as the Wilmington and Reading Railroad on May 29, 1866. The directors of the consolidated company were Edward and George Brooke, Hiester Clymer, L. Heber Smith, Hugh E. Steele, Charles E. Pennock, Charles Huston, Joseph Tatnall, Edward Betts, Joshua T. Heald, Francis Barry, James Bradford, and William S. Hilles. The first seven were ironmasters in Berks and northern Chester County, owning works along or near the proposed railroad, while the latter six were Wilmington businessmen. In addition to the industries along its route, supporters of the Wilmington and Reading anticipated that it would carry both anthracite and bituminous coal shipments furnished by the Reading, both to reach new markets along its line and to ship by water from Wilmington (relieving congestion at the Reading's Port Richmond docks).

Surveys for the line were carried out in the summer of 1866, between Wilmington and Elverson, Pennsylvania (then known as Springfield). Three routes were examined between Wilmington and the West Branch Brandywine Creek near the mouth of Buck Run (the site of Steele's Laurel Iron Works); the railroad's charter restrictions forced them to avoid the Brandywine in the vicinity of Hagley Yards. The first route ran from Wilmington over the hills to the northwest, dropping into the valley of the Brandywine at Twaddell's Ford, ten miles above the city. The second route was surveyed up the Red Clay Creek via Marshallton, Delaware, Kennett Square and Unioniville, and the third even further west by way of Avondale. The first route was ultimately adopted by the company. From there it was to pass up the West Branch to Coatesville, cross into the watershed of the East Branch near Isabella Furnace, and then run via Elverson and down the valley of Hay Creek to Birdsboro, crossing the Schuylkill River to connect with the Reading. Branches were projected to Downingtown and West Chester to connect with the Chester Valley Railroad and the West Chester and Philadelphia Railroad but were never built. It addition to the Reading, it connected to the East Brandywine & Waynesburg Railroad at Suplee; Philadelphia and Baltimore Central Railroad at Chadds Ford; to the Pennsylvania Railroad's Main Line at Coatesville and to the Philadelphia, Wilmington and Baltimore Railroad at Delaware Junction (just west of Wilmington).

The railroad's board was slightly rearranged at the annual meeting of the stockholders in March 1867. George Brooke, Smith, and Bradford left the board, and were replaced by Sheshbazzar B. Worth, another Coatesville ironmaster, and Victor and Irénée du Pont, of the gunpowder-making du Pont family. At the subsequent directors' meeting, Edward Brooke was chosen president, while Hilles was chosen secretary and treasurer. The company also obtained a charter supplement on February 25, 1867, allowing them to extend their rail line from the Christina to the Delaware River and build wharves and piers. Brooke was replaced as president by Steele in January 1868; Heald and Barry left the board to be replaced by two other Wilmingtonians, Evan C. Stotsenburg and Charles Warner.

The first revenue movement over the new railroad was a freight train from Coatesville south to Embreeville, Pennsylvania on July 28, 1869. Passenger service was inaugurated with a special train from Coatesville to Wilmington, where it accessed the PW&B line, on December 24, 1869. In the following year, construction continued north along the West Branch to Hibernia, site of an iron furnace, and on to Birdsboro and the Reading connection. The line to Birdsboro was opened for service on June 22, 1870.. Later an access spur was built in Wilmington to commercial interests along Madison Street as far as N. 2nd.

== Berks County extension and bankruptcy ==
The railroad's terminus at Birdsboro, some distance below Reading, Pennsylvania on the Schuylkill, made it dependent entirely on the Philadelphia and Reading for coal traffic. The Reading's efforts to control shipment of coal from the Schuylkill coalfields were resented by many in the region, and while the Wilmington and Reading was still in construction, observers noted that extending it to Pottsville or other points in the coal region would free it from dependence on the Reading and provide an independent outlet for the region's coal. The Manufacturers and Consumers Anthracite Railroad, a paper railroad chartered in 1866, was suggested as a vehicle for such an extension. In 1870, Asa Packer, president of the Lehigh Valley Railroad, proposed a similar project to build a rail line from the Lehigh Valley at Slatington, Pennsylvania around or through Reading to a connection with the Wilmington and Reading. The proposed line was chartered in 1871 as the Berks County Railroad. Several of the Wilmington and Reading directors were on the board, and the new railroad was looked upon as essentially an extension of the Wilmington and Reading. The junction point between the two railroads was ultimately set at High's Junction or Poplar Neck (later Cumru Junction), along the Schuylkill just below Reading, and the Wilmington and Reading began constructing a branch from Birdsboro to that point in 1874, this became the "Reading Branch'.

The adventure proved to be a disastrous one for the company. Franklin B. Gowen, the aggressive president of the Reading, fiercely resisted the construction of the Berks County Railroad, and was rumored to have threatened to embargo the Lehigh Valley's coal trade if it cooperated with the venture. The Panic of 1873 ushered in a long depression that badly eroded the financial position of the railroads and of the Wilmington and Reading's directors. The Berks County Railroad was the first to fall; it was foreclosed in late 1874 and was reorganized as the Reading and Lehigh Railroad, under the presidency of the Reading's counsel, George F. Baer. The Wilmington and Reading attempted to assert its rights to operate the Reading and Lehigh under lease, but was unsuccessful; its rolling stock was ejected from the Reading and Lehigh north of Court Street, Reading, and the Reading and Lehigh was leased to the Reading on March 11, 1875.

Collapse soon followed for the Wilmington and Reading, which failed to make an interest payment on its bonds on April 1, 1875, and investors were left scrambling. Various expedients were looked to in the hopes of saving the railroad. In 1874, the South Mountain Railroad had announced its intention of building a branch to Reading, and hope was expressed that the Pennsylvania Railroad might lease the Wilmington and Reading and direct traffic via that branch. While the Pennsylvania had been interested in the South Mountain as a route for coal to New England, it lost interest after the Panic and that railroad was never opened. Anticipating that the satisfaction of the bondholders' claims would leave nothing for the stockholders, the directors entered into negotiations with W. O. Leslie, a Philadelphia railroad promoter. Leslie was the president of the Baltimore, Philadelphia and New York Railroad, which enjoyed very broad charter rights in Pennsylvania and Maryland, but had little else to show in the way of assets except for a bit of grading near Towsontown, Maryland. Contemporary newspapers speculated that Leslie was secretly backed by the Baltimore and Ohio Railroad, but this was not the case. Almost all of the stock was issued to Leslie (who never paid in his subscription on it). The two companies agreed to merge on May 31, 1875, but no particular change occurred in the running of the railroad, which defaulted on its mortgage later in the year and was placed in the hands of commissioners to operate. The vague hopes entertained that the Baltimore and Ohio would invest in the Baltimore, Philadelphia and New York, or that its bonds could be readily placed in London, restoring some investment to the stockholders, failed to materialize.

== Reorganization ==
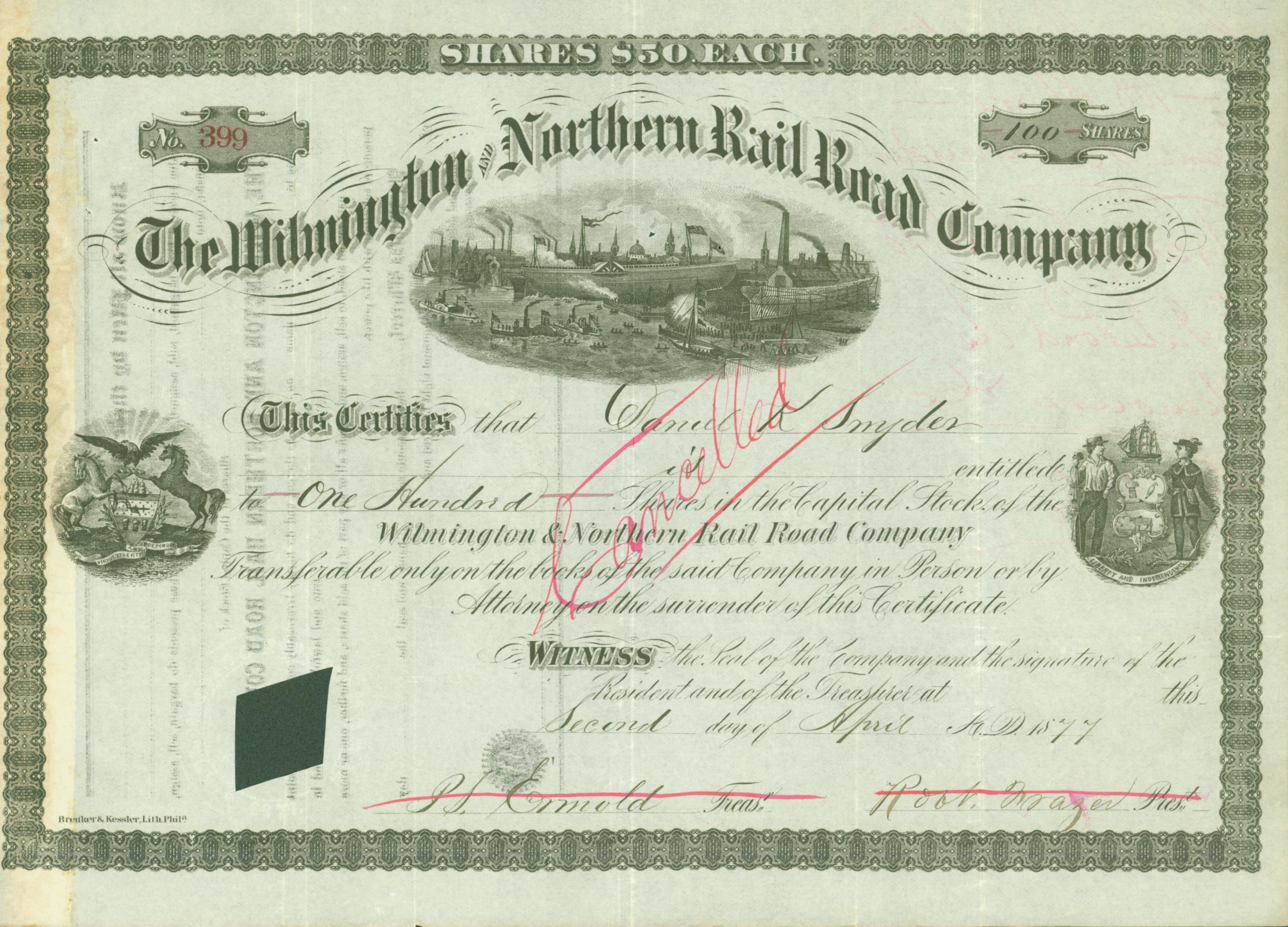
Share of the Wilmington and Northern Rail Road Company, issued 2 April 1877

The bulk of the Wilmington and Reading was sold under foreclosure on December 4, 1876. The branch from Birdsboro to Reading was sold under a separate mortgage. Due to differences in state law on mortgages, the line in Pennsylvania was reorganized as the Wilmington and Northern Railroad (of Pennsylvania) on February 5, 1877, while the portion in Delaware was reorganized as the Wilmington and Northern Railroad (of Delaware) on February 22, 1877. These two were consolidated on April 3, 1877, under Pennsylvania law as the Wilmington and Northern Railroad. The first annual meeting of the new company was held on May 7, 1877. Robert Frazer, Matthew Baird, Edward S. Buckley, Lammot du Pont, Charles Baber, George Brooke, and Daniel R. Bennett were chosen as directors. Frazer was elected president, while Peter S. Ermold was appointed secretary and treasurer and J. M. Thompson engineer and general superintendent. At the close of 1877, the railroad owned 11 engines, 11 passenger and baggage cars, and an unspecified number of freight cars. While the depressed economic conditions limited the railroad's ability to put its physical plant in good order, a new connection was built to the Pennsylvania Railroad at Coatesville, a new station was built at Second and Cherry Streets in Reading (reached via the Reading and Lehigh), and arrangements were made to use the Philadelphia, Wilmington and Baltimore Railroad's station in Wilmington as the main passenger station there.

Frazer and du Pont both resigned from the board in 1878. Frazer was succeeded as president by Bennett and as a director by L. Taylor Dickson, while Lammot was replaced by his first cousin Henry A. du Pont. The railroad made a considerable investment that year in filling in and replacing some of its bridges and replacing worn out rails. A high trestle at Dupont Station blew down in a storm on October 23 and had to be rebuilt. Further rearrangement occurred in the following year. Bennett resigned as president and director and was succeeded by du Pont, who would hold that office for the remainder of the railroad's independent operation. Buckley also resigned from the board; they were replaced by L. Waln Smith and Charles Huston, the latter an original Wilmington and Reading director.

In 1879, the railroad began construction of two new branches. The 5.7 miles (9.2 km) long French Creek Branch (aka Sainte Peters Branch, Springfield Branch, Warwick Branch), was built from Springfield (later named Elverson) to the French Creek Mines in Saint Peters. The iron ore mines supplied Edward and George Brooke's iron company at Birdsboro. The Rockland branch left the main line at Montchanin, Delaware and ran about 1 mile (1.6 km) to the Jessup and Moore paper mill on Brandywine Creek at Rockland.

The railroad also faced complications at the northern end of the line. The Reading and Lehigh (AKA Berks and Lehigh) was independently owned, but leased to the Philadelphia and Reading. It was sold at foreclosure on September 23, 1879, terminating the Wilmington and Northern's agreement with it for trackage rights from High's Junction to Reading. By now, the Wilmington and Northern had abandoned ambitions of challenging the Philadelphia and Reading, and agreed not to bid against the latter at the foreclosure sale in return for perpetual trackage rights between Birdsboro and Reading over either the Reading and Lehigh or the Philadelphia and Reading.

== Recovery and Expansion ==
During an 1879 deal with the Reading, there was an increase in traffic on the line; and so the railroad rebuilt additional freight cars and laid new passing sidings to facilitate the increased traffic.

Baird left the board in 1880 and was replaced by Antoine L. Foster, du Pont's brother-in-law.

The 1880s saw incremental expansion. The French Creek and Rockland (or Rockland Mill) branches went into service in May and June 1880, respectively, and were deemed satisfactory in increasing business on the railroad. In 1881, a wye was built at St Peters to allow engines to be turned around when they reached the end of the branch and the line to Wilmington was extended from the Western side of the city to French Street. The French Creek line gave access to a copper mine and served tourists looking to get out of the city. A stage coach company ran a stage line between West Chester and the W&N's Sager's station and another to the Lenape station for years.

In 1881-82 the railroad built the Delaware River Extension (DRE). In 1881 they built 0.75 miles (1.21 km) of rail from the junction with the main line near Little Mill Creek to the Christina River, where an iron drawbridge was later constructed; grading continued on the other side. As they were building this line, they also started a line going north from the extension along Christiana Avenue and across that road to the businesses there all the way to Commerce Street in South Wilmington. In 1882, the railroad constructed another 3.5 miles (5.6 km) of the DRE to the Delaware River at Pigeon Point, where the line could be connected - via ferry - to the Delaware Shore Railroad. To capture additional industrial traffic from South Wilmington (between the two rivers), the company also built 1.87 miles (3.01 km) long Christiana Avenue Branch (CAB) along Christiana Avenue to serve the Old Ferry Rolling Mills and several other industries. That same year, they built a new corporate headquarters in Wilmington, moving it from Coatesville and they began running trains all the way to the P&R depot in Reading. The CAB was finished in October 1882, and the DRE and its wharf on the Delaware were finished in December.

1883 was another busy year. In the winter the railroad straightened its tracks between Birdsboro and Joanna, strengthened bridges, added sidings at Conestoga and Joanna and filled in a gully at Geigertown. In July the railroad began running trains to a pier in the Delaware River that connected directly to a steamer to Cape May. It also built a new roundhouse and repair shop in Wilmington to replace the aging ones in Coatesville. Work on the Kentmere Branch (aka the Rising Sun Branch) started in the same month and trains were running in October. That branch left the main line near Silverbrook, Delaware (Barley Mill area of Wilmington today) and curved eastward to Kentmere, Rising Sun and the DuPont Powder Mills on the Brandywine Creek just north of the Wilmington city limits. The branch ended at Brandywine Bridge, just across the river from the Baltimore and Philadelphia Railroad, but by 1901 was extended further downstream to the Kentmere Dam.

Later in 1883, the W&N leased their right-of-way to the Pennsylvania Schuylkill Valley Railroad for 999 years, allowing the latter to construct a parallel line along the Reading Branch from Birdsboro to Naomi, near High's Junction and to cross over the line just east of Poplar Neck Bridge (on the west side of Ridgewood, PA). The rail line, which ran to Phoenixville, PA, connected to the W&N at Birdsboro. This revenue was applied in August of 1883 to the construction of a 1.07 miles (1.72 km) line, the South Walnut Street Branch, projecting from the Delaware Extension in South Wilmington, and of the Water Street Branch, an extension from its shop on Anchorage and Beech along the river side of the Baltimore and Philadelphia and Philadelphia, Wilmington and Baltimore Railroad (PW&B) as far as the PW&B station on French Street. The Water Street Branch required moving the tracks of the former Delaware Western Railroad, then owned by the B&O, and allowed the railroad to reach industries along the Christiana waterfront.

In 1884, the Schuylkill Valley Railroad was completed. It connected with, and in places crossed over, the W&N in Birdsboro, PA.

In 1886, the Baltimore and Ohio Railroad built the Baltimore and Philadelphia Railroad which connected to the W&N at Elsmere (Elsmere Junction) making the W&N part of the Baltimore and Ohio Railroad's route between New York and Chicago, which increased its value.

By 1887, they had added a 1.3 mile-long Hagley Branch along Brandywine Creek.

In the late 1880s a wye and spur was built off the French Creek Branch to serve the Sankanac Quarry.

In 1889, the W&N organized the New Jersey and Wilmington Ferry Company to run ferry's from the W&N pier at Pigeon Point to Penns Grove, New Jersey where passenger could connect to the Delaware River Railroad and Atlantic City, New Jersey.

In 1890, the Delaware River and Lancaster Railroad built a line from Kimberton to St. Peters where it connected to the W&N's French Creek Branch to serve the quarry and hotel there. It was operated by the W&N but did not perform well and service ended on December 1, 1893, and the tracks were removed shortly thereafter.

== Philadelphia and Reading ==
In 1898, Henry A. DuPont sold a controlling interest in the W&N to the Philadelphia and Reading railroad. On February 1, 1900, the W&N ceased to operate by its own organization and instead became a paper railroad operated by the Philadelphia and Reading Railway under a 999-year lease agreement.

In 1917, the New Jersey and Wilmington Ferry Company was dissolved.

In 1924 the Philadelphia and Reading Railway ceased operations and was replaced by the Reading Company, the P&R's holding company, and the W&N became a part of that entity.

In 1971 the Reading Company was forced into bankruptcy due to dwindling coal sales. In 1976 it transferred all of its railroad assets, including the W&N, to Conrail as part of the United States Railway Association restructuring.

== Conrail ==
In the 1975 USRA plan, the line was part of Project CS-5, which was to be sold to Chessie; however the acquisition collapsed in early 1976 due to an inability to reach an agreement with local labor unions so the line and others were conveyed into Conrail when it launched on April 1, 1976.

== Legacy ==
Several segments of the railroad line are still in operation, some segments have been turned into a trails and other pieces are abandoned.

=== Abandoned sections ===
The section between Birdsboro and Coatsville (called at times the Coatesville Secondary Track, Coatesville Industrial Track or the Joanna Secondary Track) was taken out of service by Conrail in 1972 following damage caused by Hurricane Agnes. Much of it was formally abandoned in 1984 the tracks removed in 1991 and the crossing abandoned in 1994. Other sections were sold and not abandoned. Berks county sought to purchase much of the right-of-way in 2008 for a trail, but due to opposition they voted against it. As a result, most of the right-of-way reverted to private ownership.

The French Creek Mines closed in 1928 and Knauer's quarry on December 15, 1970, at which point trains stopped running past Warwick on the French Creek Branch. By 1975, then called the French Creek Industrial Track, it had no shippers and it was not recommended for transfer to Conrail or sale to another railroad. In 1979 the Reading Company transferred the line to Conrail and then re-purchased it in 2000. Two trail conservancies purchased in 2009 and then sold it to Chester County in 2014.

The Rockland Branch, by then the Rockland Industrial Track, was still in use in 1975, but was abandoned by 1993.

The Mill Creek Branch served the Dravo Shipyards until it closed in 1965. The line was sold to the Riverfront Development Corporation in 1998 as part of the Russell W. Peterson Urban Wildlife Refuge and then removed.

The Kentmere Branch's Newbridge Station at 2000 Rising Sun Lane stopped serving passengers in 1965 and the branch was abandoned in 1976 while the Reading was in bankruptcy. The Hagley Branch ceased operations in the 1920s when the mill there shut down.

The Delaware River Extension was abandoned in pieces. The section between the Northeast Corridor and the Mill Creek Branch, just north of the Shellpot Branch, was abandoned between 1906 and 1919. The section between Elsmere Junction and the Northeast Corridor was abandoned in the 1970's or 1980's. Conrail wanted to abandon the 0.9 mile long section from the New Castle Secondary to Pigeon Point, including the railcar float, in 1976, but instead leased it to DuPont a few days after taking it over. The contract expired in 1983 and the next year the 0.9 miles to Pigeon Point was abandoned. In the 1970's the section from the Shellpot Secondary to South Heald street was taken out of use and the bridge across the Christina River swung open permanently. In 1986, Conrail abandoned the 1 mile long South Walnut Street Industrial Track (aka the South Walnut Street Branch). By the late 1990's the track had been removed and the causeway across part of the Christina was removed. This left only ~1000 feet or rail south of J Caldwell Lane in Wilmington.

On Oct 7, 1976 the W&N's Schulkill River Railroad Bridge that connected to the Wharf Branch in Reading collapsed while a train was crossing and 3 cars fell into the river. By 1981 it had been removed. The pier in the center of the river remained until it was removed or destroyed between 2019 and 2022.

In 1984, Conrail abandoned 0.78 miles of its Christiana Avenue Track in Wilmington extending between I-495 and the Christiana River.

The Wharf Branches have also been abandoned.

Along the abandoned rights-of-way there are remaining rail, bridges and other infrastructure. The Rockland Mills railroad bridge over Brandywine Creek, the French Creek Railrod Bridge near Saint Peters, PA and the Kentmere Branch Bridge over Rising Sun Lane are some of the remaining infrastructure from those spurs. There is also a bridge over Hay Creek at Scarlets Mill on the old main line.

=== Rail ===
Between Reading and Birdsboro the W&N right-of-way forms part of the Norfolk Southern-owned Harrisburg Line.

An industrial spur off the Harrisburg Line at Birdsboro follows the line 1.8 miles south to serve a quarry.

The rail line from Valley Township, just north of Coatesville, to Elsmere, Delaware is called the Wilmington and Northern Branch and has three sections with three different owners. The Brandywine Valley Railroad has owned the 3.6-mile long section from Valley Township to Modena since in bought it from Conrail in 1982. The section from Modena to the Delaware State line has passed from the Reading to the state of Pennsylvania in 1981, then to the Brandywine Valley Railroad in 2001 and to East Penn Railways in 2005. East Penn Railways (now East Penn Railroad) also purchased the section from the Delaware state line to Elsmere Junction. The section from Elsmere Junction to Wilmington was conveyed to Conrail and then to CSX Transportation in 1999.

~1000 feet of rail, that was part of the Delaware River Extension Branch, just south of J. Caldwell Lane is used to connect businesses there to the New Castle Secondary.

The section through Reading, once known as the Wharf Branch, now makes up part of the Spruce Street Industrial Track which extends off the Pottsville Branch at Muhlenberg Township all the way to the Neversink Substation in south Reading. Though still extant, it has been out of use since ~2020.

=== Roads ===
A portion of N. Brick Lane in Elverson is built on the old French Creek Branch rail right-of-way.

Livingstone Road in Robeson Township follows the right-of-way from Cold Run Road to its western terminus.

=== Stations ===
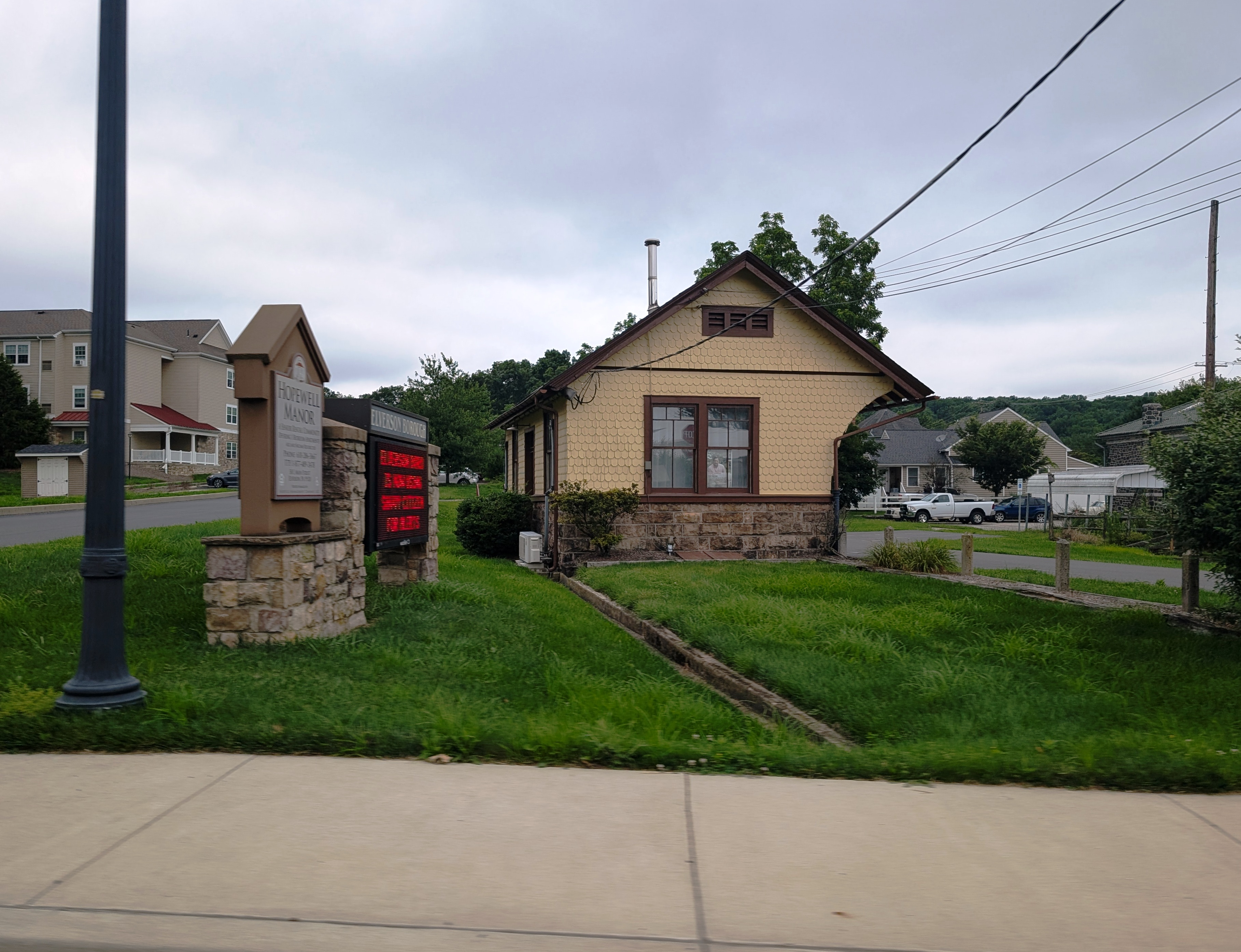
Elverson Railroad Station in 2025

The Modena Station, constructed in 1882 and also served as a store, was later converted into a private home.

The Elverson Train Station, built in 1870 as the Springfield Station, and the next door freight depot still stand in Elverson.

The 1889 Montchanin Station (formerly DuPont Station) in Montchanin, DE is currently used as office space and a residence, though for a time it was a post office.

The Birdsboro Station was demolished in 1963.

=== Trails ===
In 2008, Berks County began planning a trail, the Hay Creek Trail, along the right-of-way within its boundaries, however it was voted down in September 2008 due to landowner pushback and eminent domain disputes. A portion of the trail, within the Birdsboro Preserve, does exist.

The St. Peters Rail Trail and Horse-shoe Trail follows ~1.6 mile of the old French Creek Branch west from St. Peter's Village to the east edge of Crow's Nest Preserve. Sections of the French Creek Branch are also used as a foot paths between the train station, Park Avenue and Half Street that make up part of the Big Woods Trail in Elverson, PA. In addition there were plans to build a rail trail, called the Boars Back Rail-trail, on the French Creek Branch from St. Peters to Warwick in 2008, though the project appears to have stalled.

The Horse-shoe Trail also crosses the main line right-of-way on an old bridge, built in 1881, that was moved to the Scarlets Mill area in the early 20th Century.

The Rim Trail in Hibernia County Park was built on 2.2 miles of former W&N rail line.

A short section of the Brandywine Heritage Trail in Rockford Park in Wilmington follows the right-of-way of the Kentmere Branch.

=== Bridges ===
A bridge over Hay Creek on the right-of-way between White Bear Road and Hay Creek Road remains, though it is unused.

A bridge over Mine Run is used by the St. Peters Rail Trail. Another trestle, over French Creek, just north of St. Peters is unused but extant.

The abutments of the old bridge over Chestnut Tree Road in West Nantmeal Township remain.

A causeway over Robert G. Struble Lake remains on the west side of the lake.

A bridge over the West Branch of Brandywine Creek is in use as part of the Rim Trail.

US-30/Coatesville-Downington Bypass has a bridge over the old right-of-way just west of the West Branch of Brandywine Creek.

The Rockland Mills Railroad Bridge over Brandywine Creek remains just south of Rockland Mills Village.

Abutments for bridges on the line to Sankanac Quarry remain within State Game Lands #43.

The swing span of the bridge across the Christina River remains - in the open position and unusable - in the river.

The pier for the car float at Pigeon Point is still visible, though decaying, in the Delaware River.

=== Tunnel and Underpasses ===
An underpass where the Kentmere Branch passed beneath Route 52 is still used to bridge a stream there. Further east down the line is a bridge over a small creek and then still further, the remnants of Delaware's only rail tunnel located just behind 2005 Rising Sun Lane.
