= Allentown station =

Allentown station could refer to two stations in Allentown, Pennsylvania:

- Allentown station (Central Railroad of New Jersey)
- Allentown station (Lehigh Valley Railroad)
