= Main Line (Reading Company) =

Railway line in Pennsylvania

Overview
- Status: Split into the Harrisburg Line and Pottsville Line
- Owner: Philadelphia and Reading Railroad (1838–1896); Philadelphia and Reading Railway (1896–1924); Reading Company (1924–1976)

History
- Opened: 1 May 1838
- Conveyed to Conrail: 1 April 1976

Technical
- Line length: 88 mi (142 km)
- Track gauge: 1,435 mm (4 ft 8 1/2 in) standard gauge

The Main Line of the Reading Company was a railway line in the U.S. state of Pennsylvania. The 88-mile-long (142 km) main line ran from Philadelphia to Pottsville, Pennsylvania, following the Schuylkill River.

Following the Reading Company's bankruptcy in the 1970s, the line was conveyed to Conrail. The physical line continues to exist but is no longer administered as a single unit. Conrail split the line, combining the section from Philadelphia to Reading with the Lebanon Valley Branch to form the Harrisburg Line. The section north of Reading was designated the Pottsville Line; Conrail later sold most of the branch to the Reading Blue Mountain and Northern Railroad.

== Route ==
The northern end of the line was in Pottsville. From there, it ran south, following the Schuylkill River, to Philadelphia. The Pennsylvania Railroad's Schuylkill Branch ran parallel most of the way and crossed the main line at several points. In Reading, Pennsylvania, it interchanged with the Lebanon Valley Branch with service west to Harrisburg and the East Pennsylvania Branch with service east to the Lehigh Valley.

Another major interchange point was at Birdsboro, Pennsylvania, which featured a junction with the Pennsylvania's Schuylkill Branch and the Reading Belt Branch and Wilmington and Northern Branch. Most passenger services diverged from the main line at Norristown, Pennsylvania, using the Norristown Branch to reach the Reading Terminal. The southern end of the line was at East Falls, Philadelphia, at a wye meeting the City Branch and Richmond Branch.

== History ==
=== 19th century ===
The oldest section of the eventual main line was the 1.25 miles (2.01 km) between Mount Carbon, Pennsylvania and Pottsville. The Mount Carbon Railroad completed this line in 1831. Philadelphia and Reading Railroad (P&R) leased the line in 1863 and consolidated the company in 1872.

The P&R opened the section between Reading and Pottstown, Pennsylvania, on May 1, 1838. On July 16, the company extended the line further south to Bridgeport, across the Schuylkill River from Norristown and the northern terminus of the Philadelphia, Germantown and Norristown Railroad. The P&R completed the southern portion of its main line on December 5, 1839, when it connected with the Philadelphia and Columbia Railroad at the Columbia Railroad Bridge. The line was extended north to Mount Carbon, on January 1, 1842, establishing the connection with the Mount Carbon Railroad.

The P&R completed the Richmond Branch in 1842, extending from the main line at Schuylkill Falls to the Port Richmond section of Philadelphia, where the Reading had built a major port for handling coal.

In 1851, the Reading acquired the Philadelphia and Columbia Railroad's line into Philadelphia, including the Columbia Railroad Bridge. The section from the junction with the Richmond Branch, continuing across the Schuylkill, would later be called the City Branch.

=== 20th century ===
The line remained within the Reading system through multiple reorganizations until 1976, when it was one of many Reading lines conveyed to Conrail. Conrail split the line, combining the section from Philadelphia to Reading with the Lebanon Valley Branch to form the Harrisburg Line. The section north of Reading was designated the Pottsville Line; Conrail later sold most of the branch to the Reading Blue Mountain and Northern Railroad.

== Passenger service ==
Aside from Reading Blue Mountain and Northern Railroad excursion service, the former Reading main line hosts no scheduled passenger service. The last vestige of the Reading's passenger service on the line was SEPTA's commuter service between Reading Terminal and Pottsville. SEPTA discontinued the service, with its other non-electrified routes, on July 1, 1981.
