= Quo warranto =

Legal document requiring the addressee to prove their authority to act

In the English-American common law, quo warranto (Medieval Latin for "by what warrant?") is a prerogative writ issued by a court which orders someone to show what authority they have for exercising some right, power, or franchise they claim to hold. The writ of quo warranto still exists in the United States, although it is uncommon, but it has been abolished in England and Wales. Quo warranto is also used, with slightly different effect, in the Philippines.

== Early history ==
With the spread of royal justice in the 12th and 13th centuries, private franchises and liberties were increasingly called upon to uphold the king's peace: to act against "malefactors and peace breakers, so that it may appear that you are a lover of our peace". From 1218 onwards, royal Eyres also began using the old writ of quo warranto – a court order to show proof of authority, as for example (literally) "By what warrant are you the sheriff?" – to investigate the origins of such franchises. An inquest of 1255 began examining such liberties nationwide; and the same enquiry was taken up again by King Edward I of England in 1278, when he decreed in the Statute of Gloucester that "We must find out what is ours, and due to us, and others what is theirs, and due to them".

From one point of view this can be seen as an attempt to investigate and recover royal lands, rights, and franchises in England, in particular those lost during the reign of his father, King Henry III of England. From another, it was less of an attack on franchises as a clarification of them: in Hilda Johnstone's words, "Edward's aim, it is clear, was from the first not abolition but definition".

Statute of Quo Warranto
- Act of Parliament
- Parliament of England
- Long title: Statutum de Quo Warranto
- Citation: 18 Edw. 1 (Note: This is the citation in The Statutes of the Realm.); 18 Edw. 1. Stat. 2 (Note: This is the citation in The Statutes at Large.)
- Territorial extent: England and Wales; Ireland

Dates
- Royal assent: 1290
- Commencement: 1290
- Repealed: 15 August 1879

Other legislation
- Repealed by: Civil Procedure Acts Repeal Act 1879
- Relates to: Statutum de Quo Warranto Novum

Status: Repealed

Text of statute as originally enacted

Statutum de Quo Warranto Novum
- Act of Parliament
- Parliament of England
- Long title: Statutum de Quo Warranto Novum
- Citation: 18 Edw. 1; 18 Edw. 1. Stat. 3
- Territorial extent: England and Wales; Ireland

Dates
- Royal assent: 1290
- Commencement: 1290
- Repealed: 15 August 1879

Other legislation
- Repealed by: Civil Procedure Acts Repeal Act 1879
- Relates to: Statute of Quo Warranto

Status: Repealed

Text of statute as originally enacted

A similar ambiguity surrounds the role of the justices that, from 1278 to 1294, Edward dispatched throughout the Kingdom of England to inquire "by what warrant" English lords claimed their liberties and exercised jurisdiction, including the right to hold a court and collect its profits. Some of the justices demanded written proof in the form of charters, others accepted a plea of "immemorial tenure"; and resistance and the unrecorded nature of many grants meant that eventually, by the Statute of Quo Warranto (18 Edw. 1) (1290), the principle was generally accepted that those rights peacefully exercised since 1189 – the beginning of the reign of Richard I, which is the legal definition in England of the phrase "time immemorial" – were legitimate.

=== Publication ===
The quo warranto pleas from the reigns of Edward I, Edward II and Edward III were published by the Record Commission in 1818.

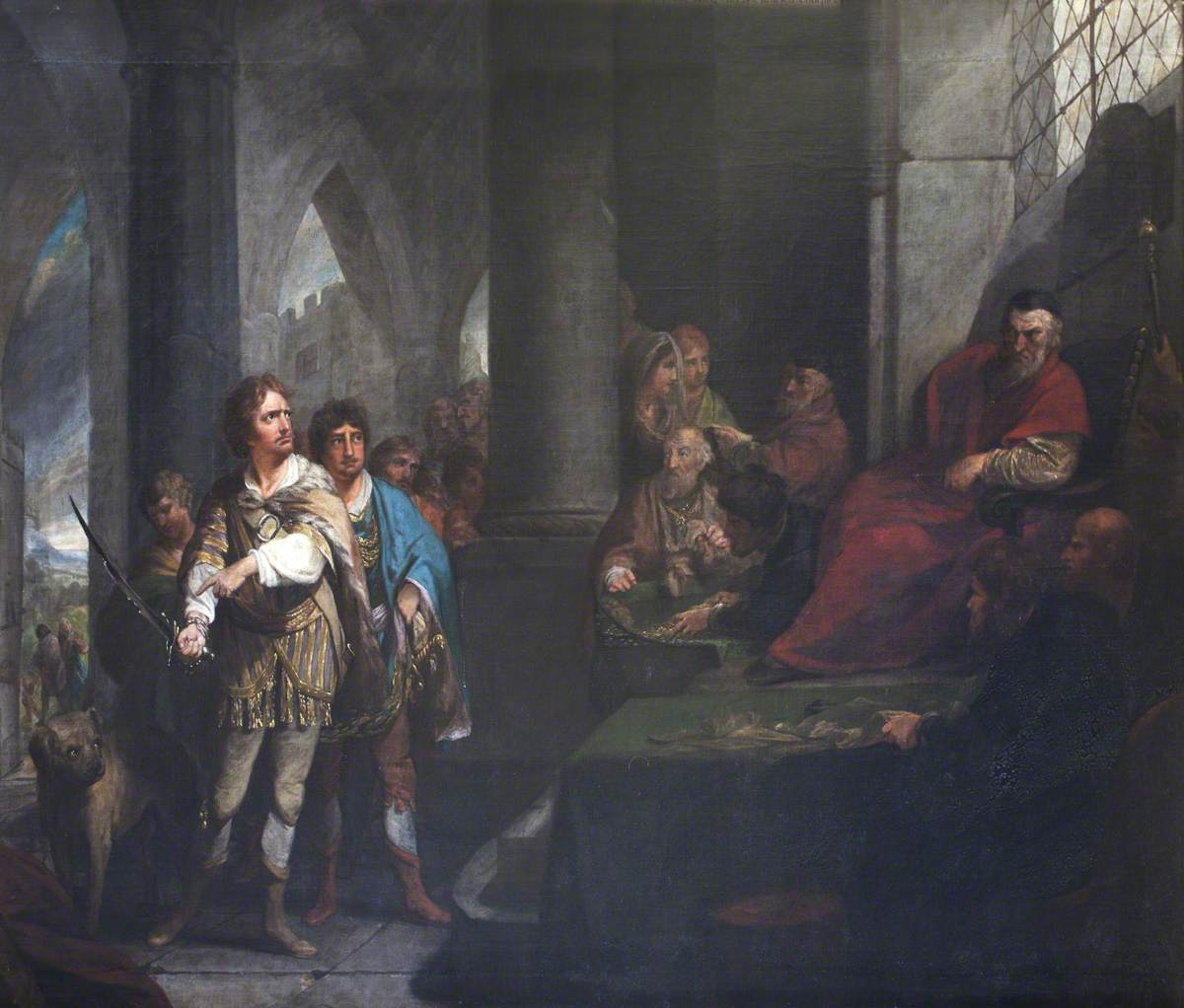
Illustration of a famous anecdote by Walter of Guisborough: John de Warenne, 6th Earl of Surrey (left of painting) is served a writ of Quo warranto and in response draws a sword, calling it his warrant; he adds, "My ancestors came with William the Bastard, and conquered their lands with the sword, and I will defend them with the sword against anyone wishing to seize them." (Painting by Robert Edge Pine, 1770)

== Later developments ==
The most famous historical instance of quo warranto was the action taken against the Corporation of London by Charles II in 1683. The King's Bench adjudged the charter and franchises of the City of London to be forfeited to the Crown, though this judgment was reversed by the London, Quo Warranto Judgment Reversed Act 1689 shortly after the Glorious Revolution.

But the remodelling of the City of London was only part of a wider remodelling of some forty chartered parliamentary boroughs by the Crown – a policy taken up again in 1688 by James II, when some thirty-five new charters were issued after quo warranto produced the surrender of the old ones. This Quo Warranto remodelling or 'dissolution' of the parliamentary corporations gave point to the claim by William III that "our expedition is intended for no other design but to have a free and lawful parliament assembled", and underpinned the charge in the Bill of Rights that James had been "violating the freedom of election by members to serve in parliament".

== Modern quo warranto ==
While quo warranto remains in use in the United States, the Philippines, India and other jurisdictions, in some jurisdictions that have enacted judicial review statutes, the prerogative writ of quo warranto has been abolished.

=== Australia ===
Quo warranto writs have been abolished in the Australian states of New South Wales (as of the Supreme Court Act 1970) and Queensland (as of the Judicial Review Act 1991).

=== England and Wales ===
The writ of quo warranto and its replacement, the information in the nature of a quo warranto are either obsolete or have been abolished. Section 30 of the Senior Courts Act 1981 grants to the High Court the power to issue an injunction to restrain persons from acting in offices in which they are not entitled to act and to declare the office vacant if necessary.

=== United States ===
Quo warranto could be brought against a corporation when it misuses its franchise. In 1890, the Supreme Court of Ohio wrote:

The corporation has received vitality from the state. It continues during its existence to be the creature of the state, must live subservient to its laws, and has such powers and franchises as those laws have bestowed upon it, and none others. As the state was not bound to create it in the first place, it is not bound to maintain it after having done so, if it violates the laws or public policy of the state, or misuses its franchises to oppress the citizens thereof.

In 1876, the Pennsylvania senate passed a resolution instructing the Attorney General to begin quo warranto proceedings to revoke the charter of the Baltimore, Philadelphia and New York Railroad.

In the modern United States, quo warranto usually arises in a civil case as a plaintiff's claim (and thus a "cause of action" instead of a writ) that some governmental or corporate official was not validly elected to that office or is wrongfully exercising powers beyond (or ultra vires) those authorized by statute or by the corporation's charter. An example of this happened in 2026 in Avenal, California, when the majority of the city's council and its mayor claimed that a successful recall election against them was invalid. The state's attorney general granted the recall's organizers permission to sue them under quo warranto.

In New York State, the former writ of quo warranto has been codified. Per Executive Law § 63-b, citizens through a judge, or the Attorney General, at his or her discretion, "may maintain an action, upon his own information or upon the complaint of a private person, against a person who usurps, intrudes into, or unlawfully holds or exercises within the state a franchise or a public office, civil or military, or an office in a domestic corporation."

=== Philippines ===
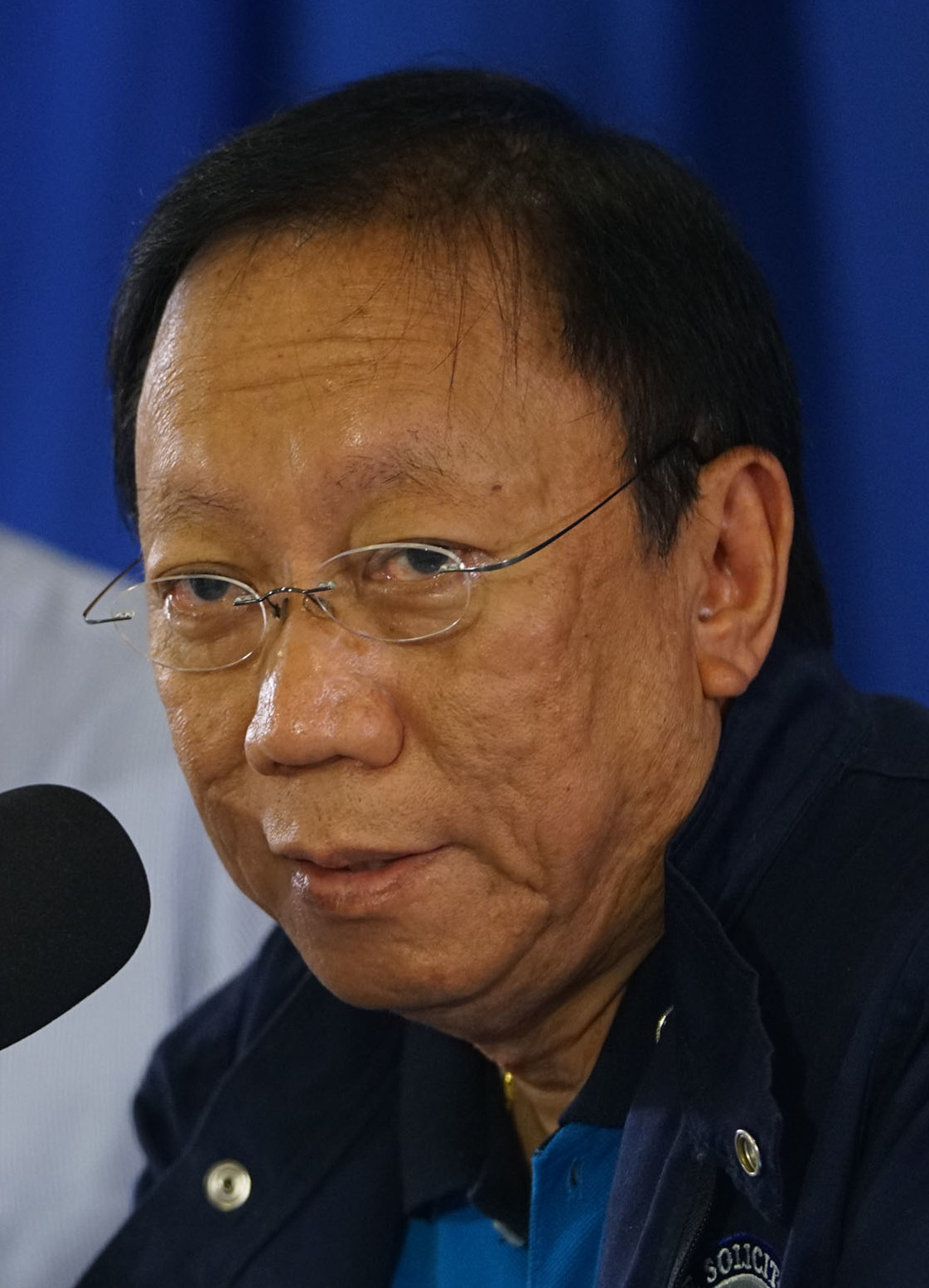
Jose Calida, above, is credited with substantially expanding the quo warranto power, after his arguments were looked upon with favor by the Supreme Court in Republic v. Sereno.

A quo warranto petition was, before the appointment of Jose Calida as Solicitor General, a very seldom used Philippine extraordinary writ. Its name derives from the Latin question quo warranto, which means "by what authority?" (Note: Sometimes rendered as "by whose authority?", although quo literally means "where" or "why".) In its early days, during the American colonial period, quo warranto was mostly used to challenge a democratic election, that is, to make the claim that the person who is holding an office is a usurper, and that someone else deserves the office, e.g., due to electoral fraud or ineligibility. Indeed, this is the only way the term is used in law professor Ernesto C. Salao's (Note: As of January 2018, associate dean of the Polytechnic University of the Philippines College of Law.) widely cited 858-page book The 1987 Constitution of the Republic of the Philippines (2001 ed.).

It has come to be understood that it can be used in extraordinary cases to unseat judicial appointees, and impeachable officials, not only to challenge elections. Some, such as Ranhilio Aquino, (Note: As of 2011, dean of the San Beda University College of Law. See Rex G. Rico (2011-11-24). "Value of a non-lawyer's opinion on purely legal issues". Philippine Daily Inquirer.) argue this due to the fact that the President and Vice President were explicitly enumerated as vulnerable to quo warranto by the Supreme Court sitting as the Presidential Electoral Tribunal, and, unlike many other constitutions, Article 11 of the 1987 Constitution does not exclusively grant the power of impeachment to Congress.

==== Quo warranto of non-elected appointees ====
Quo warranto petitions, when successful, do not "remove" someone from office—they declare the very appointment itself null and void ab initio, meaning that the office was never legally held as it has been declared to have been assumed under false pretenses. This is precisely what happened in the highly controversial quo warranto petition against Maria Lourdes Sereno. Sereno had served on the Supreme Court of the Philippines as de facto Chief Justice of the Philippines from 2012 to 2018, and as a regular Associate Justice since August 2010, when she was appointed by President Benigno Aquino III. Instead of removing Sereno from office by the mechanism of impeachment, Callida chose to use what one justice called this "road less travelled" of quo warranto.

==== Corporate franchise quo warranto ====
Quo warranto was also used, once again by Calida, to challenge the continued operation of ABS-CBN after the expiration of its Congressional franchise. This use of quo warranto in a dispute over licensure was as novel as it was literal: it strips away the traditions surrounding the use of quo warranto and refocuses quo warranto on the meaning of its name, asking by what legal authority does ABS-CBN continue to operate. However, the expiration of the franchise and later actions by the National Telecommunications Commission made Calida's quo warranto petition moot.

== See also ==
- Quia Emptores

== Sources ==
=== Edition of proceedings ===
- Illingworth, William, ed. (1818). Placita de Quo Warranto temporibus Edw. I. II. & III. in Curia Receptae Scaccarii Westm. Asservata. Record Commission. London.

=== Bibliography ===
- Clanchy, M. T. (1993). From Memory to Written Record: England 1066–1307 (Second ed.). Oxford: Blackwell. ISBN 978-0-631-16857-7.
- Prestwich, Michael (1997) [1988]. Edward I (revised ed.). New Haven: Yale University Press. ISBN 0-300-07209-0.)
- Prestwich, Michael (1980). The Three Edwards: War and State in England 1272–1377. London: Weidenfeld & Nicolson. ISBN 0-297-77730-0.
- Sutherland, Donald W. (1963). Quo Warranto Proceedings in the Reign of Edward I, 1278–1294. Oxford: Clarendon Press.
