= Reading Line =

Railroad in Pennsylvania

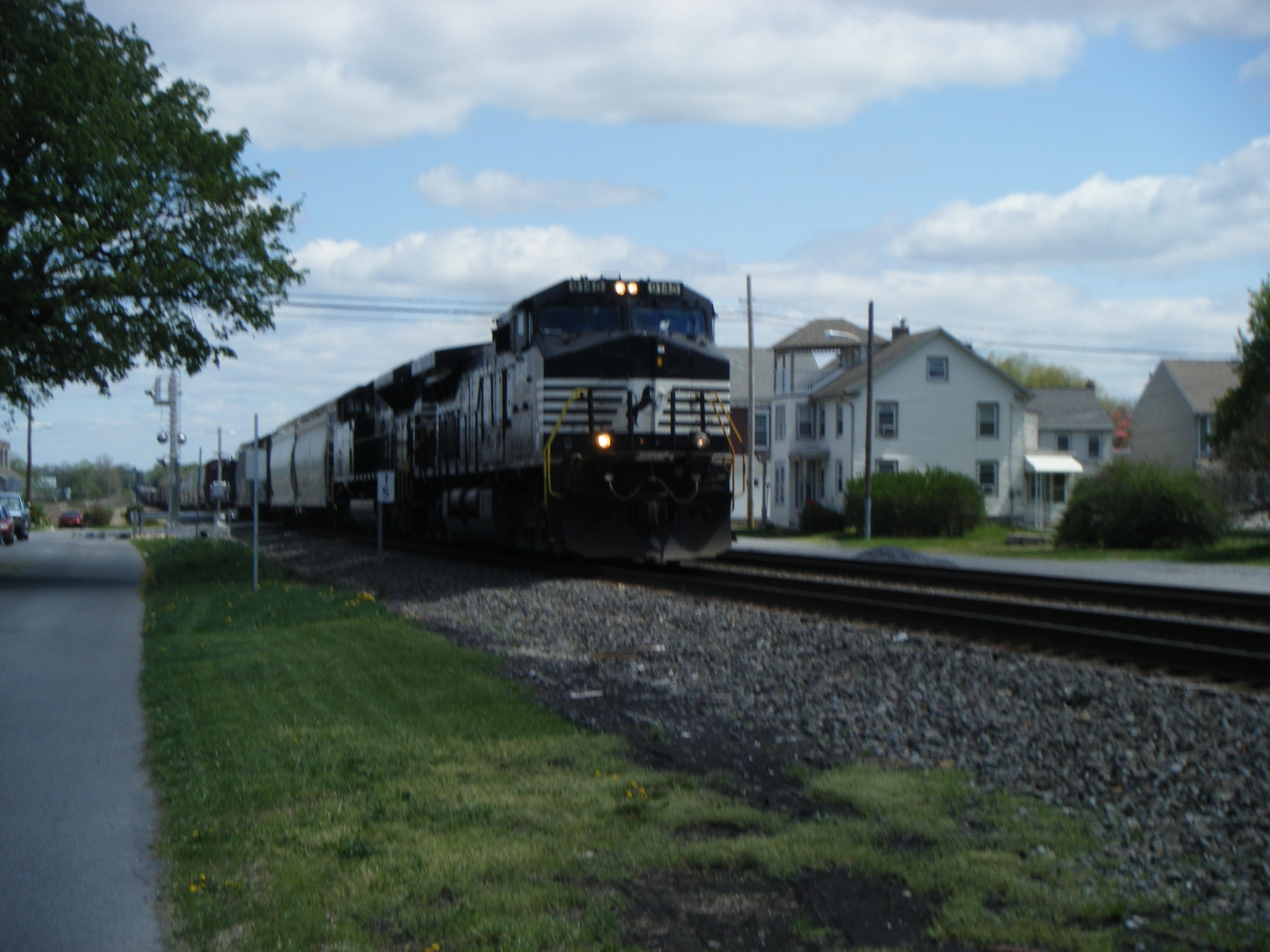
- A Norfolk Southern train on the Reading Line in Lyons, Pennsylvania, in April 2011

Overview
- Status: Operational
- Owner: Norfolk Southern Railway
- Locale: Eastern Pennsylvania, U.S.
- Termini: Wyomissing Junction in Wyomissing, Pennsylvania, U.S.; Bethlehem, Pennsylvania, U.S.

Service
- Type: Freight rail
- System: Norfolk Southern Railway
- Operator(s): Norfolk Southern Railway

History
- Opened: May 11, 1859

Technical
- Line length: 37 Miles
- Number of tracks: 1-2
- Track gauge: 1,435 mm (4 ft 8 1/2 in) standard gauge

The Reading Line is a main freight line in Pennsylvania owned and operated by Norfolk Southern Railway. It stretches from the Harrisburg Line at Wyomissing Junction in Wyomissing, Pennsylvania to a junction with the Lehigh Line in Bethlehem, Pennsylvania. The line sees about 65 trains a day, mostly trains running from North Jersey and Allentown, Pennsylvania to points west and south.

The line is mostly double-track with the only area of single track between CP Blandon and CP West Laurel. Trains go faster on this line than most others.

== History ==
=== 19th century ===
The line opened as the East Pennsylvania Railroad on May 11, 1859, connecting Allentown with Reading. The railroad became part of the Reading Railroad, and carried traffic from the Allentown area to their main line.

=== 20th century ===
In 1976, the Reading Railroad was acquired by Conrail, which continued to use the line as a conduit between North Jersey and the rest of the country. When Conrail was split in 1999, Norfolk Southern was assigned the line.

=== 21st century ===
On March 14, 2018, Norfolk Southern increased speeds along the Reading Line from 50 mph (80 km/h) to 60 mph (97 km/h) at 33 grade crossings and from 55 mph (89 km/h) to 60 mph (97 km/h) at three grade crossings. The speed change was intended to increase the efficiency of rail operations and improve the flow of vehicular traffic at grade crossings.
