= Allentown station (Central Railroad of New Jersey) =

Defunct train station in Allentown, Pennsylvania

Allentown
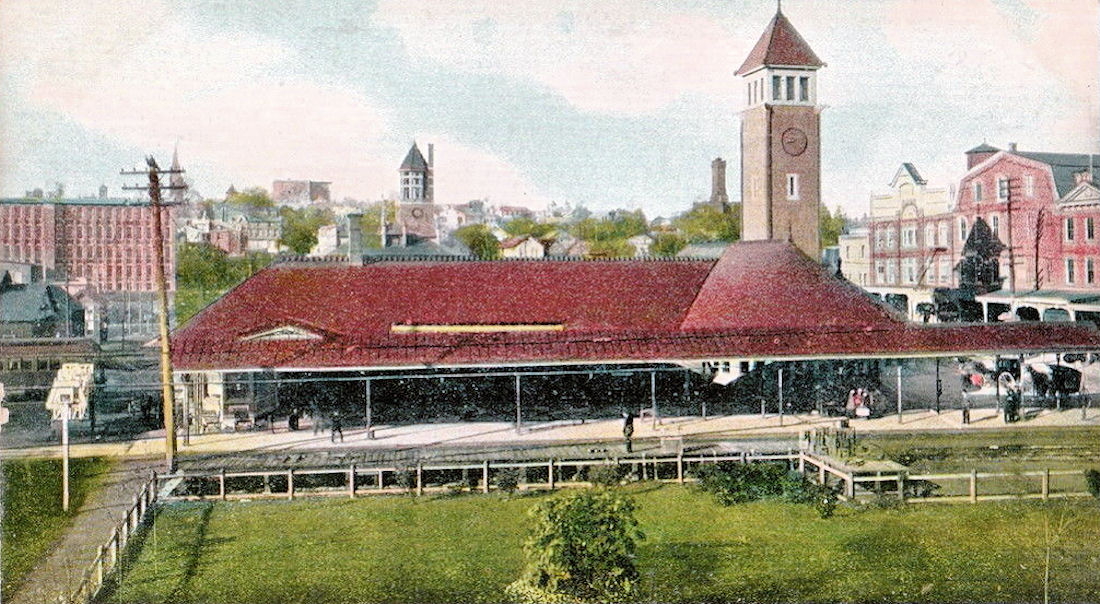
- Allentown station in Allentown, Pennsylvania depicted in a 1901 illustration

General information
- Location: 369 Hamilton Street, Allentown, Pennsylvania, U.S.
- Coordinates: 40°36′16″N 075°27′44″W
- Lines: Central Railroad of New Jersey: Lehigh and Susquehanna Railroad; Reading Company

History
- Opened: 1890
- Closed: 1967

Former services
Preceding station	Central Railroad of New Jersey	Following station
Mauch Chunk toward Scranton	Main Line	Bethlehem toward Jersey City
Catasauqua toward Scranton	Main Line	Bethlehem Junction toward Jersey City
Preceding station	Reading Railroad	Following station
Emmaus toward Reading	East Pennsylvania Railroad	Terminus
Emmaus toward Perkiomen Junction	Perkiomen Branch	Terminus
Location

Allentown station is a defunct train station in Allentown, Pennsylvania. It was constructed by the Central Railroad of New Jersey (CNJ) and Reading Railroad in 1888 and 1889. For most of the late 19th and early 20th century, it provided passenger train service between Allentown and various U.S. Coast locations.

In 1967, the station's use was discontinued following cessation of CNJ passenger service. The station is located one block east of the Lehigh Valley Railroad's Allentown station.

== History ==
=== 19th century ===
During the first half of the 19th century, Allentown was primarily a small market town for farmers. By 1851, the first railroad reached Allentown with the chartering of the Delaware, Lehigh, Schuylkill and Susquehanna Railroad, which later became the Lehigh Valley Railroad. A small station was built in 1855, linking Allentown with Easton to the east and present-day Jim Thorpe to the north. The railroad, however, was not yet a major factor in local transportation at the time.

During the Civil War, the region of Allentown surrounding Lehigh River underwent extensive industrialization. New companies and industries needed cheap and reliable transportation systems to haul the raw materials and the finished products. The Lehigh Canal, built in the 1820s, was the major transport link used to haul anthracite coal from the Coal Region in Northeast Pennsylvania to factories.

In 1862, a major flood seriously damaged the canal. Charters were issued to two railroad companies, the Lehigh Valley Railroad and the Lehigh and Susquehanna Railroad, which were later leased to the Central Railroad of New Jersey to build lines into Allentown. Soon after, the Reading Company's rail lines entered Allentown. Along with existing freight railroads, Allentown emerged as a major national destination for immigrants who could easily find work in Allentown's the textile mills and factories of the city's fast-growing textile industry.

In the late 1880s, both railroads built elaborate stations in Allentown, and all lines serving Allentown converged at the two stations.

Lehigh Valley rail lines ran south from Mauch Chunk in present-day Jim Thorpe, Pennsylvania to Allentown, primarily following the west banks of the Lehigh River. The lines crossed under the Tilghman Street Bridge past Lehigh Valley's freight yard north of Walnut Street, then under Linden Street to the passenger station. The lines continued south, then turned east, following the west side of the Lehigh River through the Rittersville section of Allentown and then to Fountain Hill, and South Bethlehem under the Hill to Hill Bridge, past Bethlehem Steel to Easton.

CNJ tracks ran along the east side of the Lehigh River from Mauch Chunk in present-day Jim Thorpe then crossed the Lehigh River, where American Parkway now ends and turns onto North Dauphin Street. The former CNJ crossover bridge remains standing derelict crossing the river. South of Allentown, CNJ turned east and again crossed the Lehigh River, following the west side through CNJ's Allentown yard, which is now operated by Norfolk Southern Railway.

Both lines into Allentown were double-tracked, paralleling each other into their respective stations following American Parkway, which was later built on the abandoned railbed. A shared, separate double-tracked freight line ran to the east of the passenger stations.

=== 20th century ===
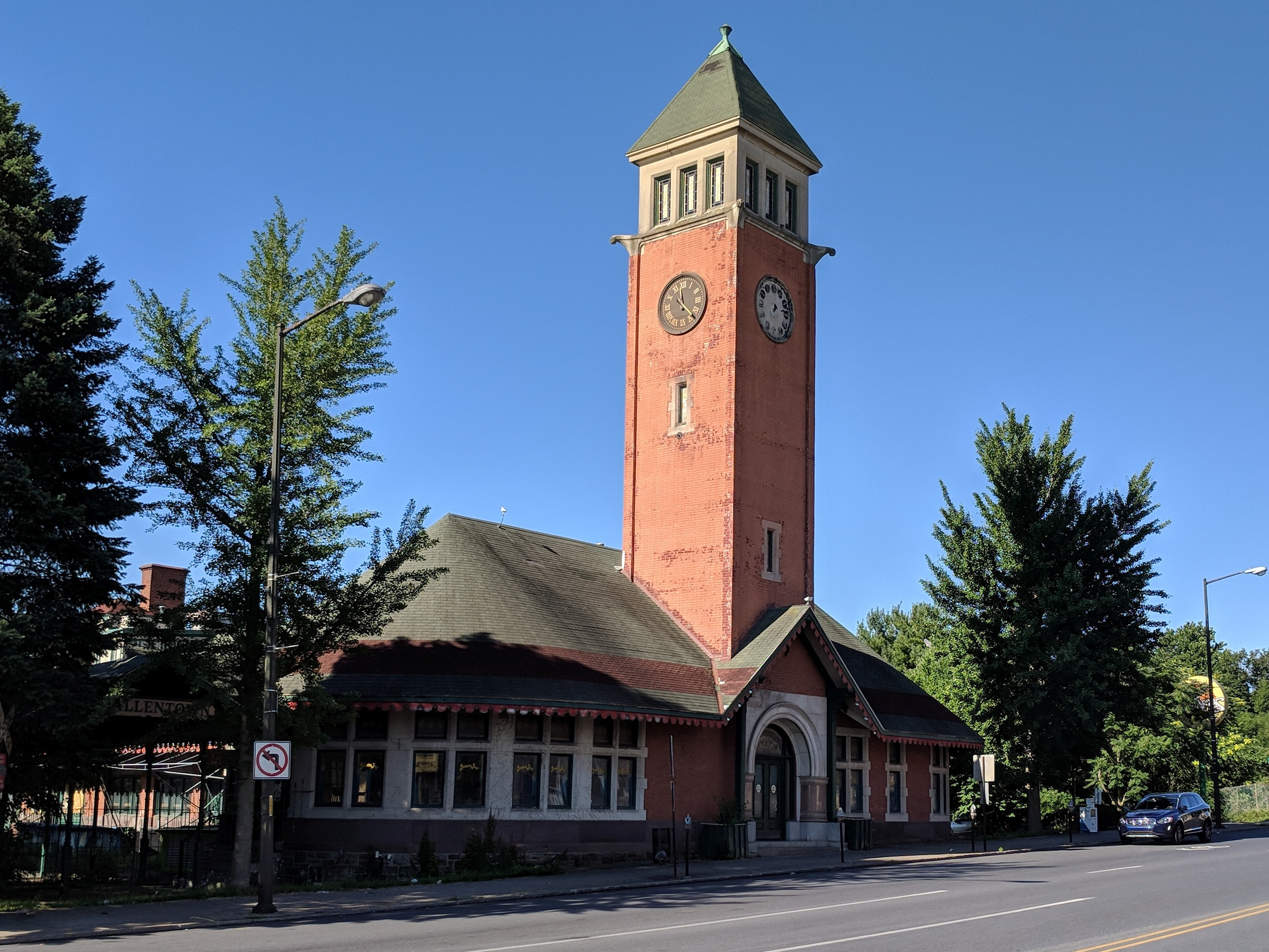
The former Central Railroad of New Jersey station in Allentown in July 2018

During World War I, both stations were used by the United States Army Ambulance Service (USAAS) that operated Camp Crane, a training camp for Army Ambulance drivers and support personnel. Thousands of soldiers arrived in Allentown at the stations, then were transported to the training camp. After graduating from training, the stations became pre-embarkation point, with thousands of men moving in and out rapidly, usually arriving and leaving on trains in the middle of the night.

The Allentown stations provided passenger rail service for decades to Scranton, Reading, Harrisburg, New York City, Philadelphia, and other points on the nation's inter-city rail network. Major trains included the Queen of the Valley, a CNJ/Reading train from Jersey City to Harrisburg, the Interstate Express, a Reading/Lackawanna train from Syracuse, New York to Philadelphia, the Scranton Flyer/Philadelphia Flyer, a Reading train from Philadelphia to Scranton.

LV had its peak of passengers during the 1940s, however during the 1950s, as the Interstate Highway network grew and long-distance bus and airline service expanded, passenger patronage declined. LV petitioned the Interstate Commerce Commission to cut back its unprofitable passenger service. LV ended service to Allentown on February 4, 1961.

The Allentown Terminal Station was operated jointly by CNJ and the Reading Railroad (RDG). Both CNJ and RDG leased each other's lines in Pennsylvania, and suffered the same fate in terms of reduced passenger ridership. RDG's Allentown to Harrisburg passenger service ended in June 1963, terminating its Allentown service at the CNJ station by 1965. It continued operations to Jersey City, New Jersey, for two more years before ending all passenger service from Allentown in 1967.

After the end of passenger rail service to Allentown, both LV and CNJ stations were closed and abandoned. Both stations became derelict and LV station was demolished in 1972 with the widening of the Hamilton Street Bridge over Jordan Creek. Some rusting steel beams extending over the Creek remain.

CNJ rail lines were dismantled, and Hamilton Street was resurfaced over where the lines had run. The CNJ station remained derelict until 1980, when the property was restored as a restaurant. The renovated property went through several owners, serving as the Depot Restaurant, Gingerbread Man, B&G Station, Jillian's, and Billiard Cafe over the next two decades, and was lastly Banana Joe's, which opened on Labor Day 2001. In September 2007, however, the property abruptly closed following a shooting, which resulted in a dramatic drop-off in patrons. It has remained closed and vacant since then.

== See also ==
- List of historic places in Allentown, Pennsylvania
