= Water Street station =

Coordinates: 39.7376°N 75.5535°W

Water Street Station is a former station of the Baltimore and Ohio Railroad in Wilmington, Delaware, designed by Frank Furness. The station was located on the eastern end of the B&O's Landenberg branch, roughly parallel to the Northeast Corridor of the Pennsylvania Railroad. The station served only trains terminating in Wilmington; through trains used a separate station at Delaware Avenue to the northwest. Another user of the station was the Wilmington and Northern Railroad, later controlled by the Reading Company.

Preceding station	Baltimore and Ohio Railroad	Following station
Elsmere Junction toward Landenberg	Landenberg Branch	Terminus
Preceding station	Reading Railroad	Following station
Elsmere Junction toward Reading	Wilmington and Northern Branch	Terminus
