= Central Park (Allentown, Pennsylvania) =

Former amusement park in Pennsylvania, USA

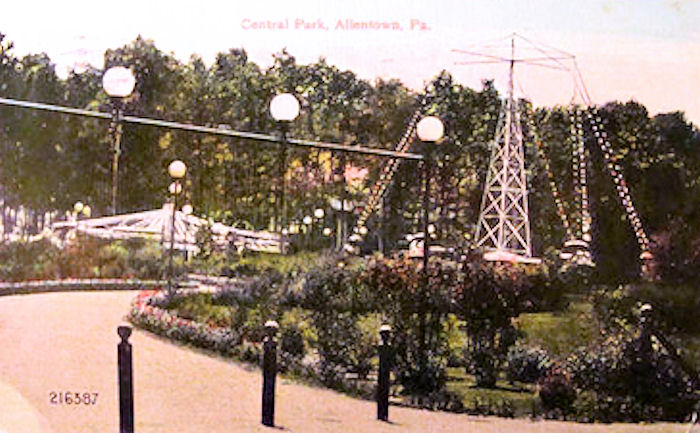
- 1914 postcard of Central Park
- Interactive map of Central Park
- Location: Allentown, Pennsylvania, U.S.
- Coordinates: 40°37′20″N 075°25′15″W
- Status: Defunct
- Opened: 1893
- Closed: 1951
- Area: 40 acres (0.16 km^{2})

Attractions
- Total: 25
- Roller coasters: 3
- Water rides: 1

Central Park was an amusement park in the Rittersville section of Allentown, Pennsylvania. It operated from 1893 to 1951.

== History ==
=== 19th century ===
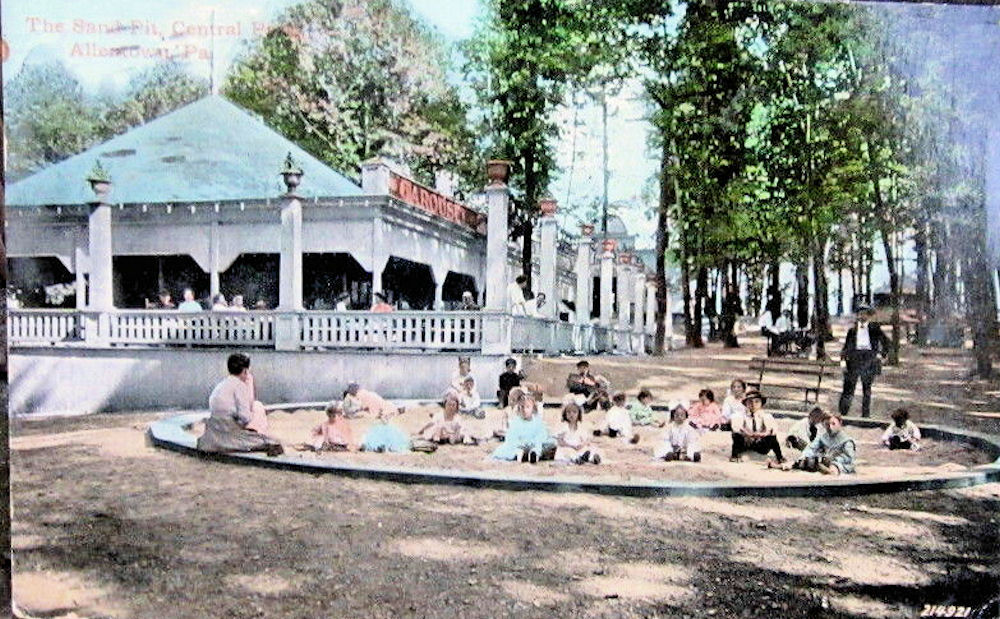
Sandbox, c. 1900

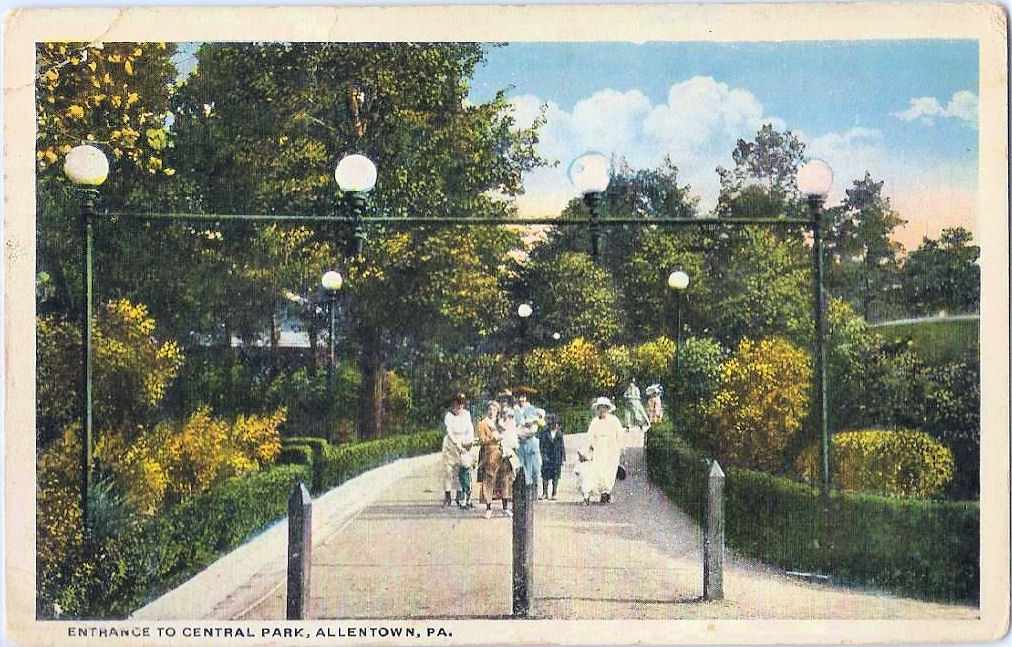
Park entrance, c. 1910

Central Park's origins date back to 1868, when J. Frank Reichart laid out a race course north of the Allentown-Bethlehem Turnpike at present-day Hanover Avenue in Allentown, Pennsylvania, which opened for trotting and pacing from May to August. In 1872, the Rittersville Park Association was organized. The park was enlarged to 16 acres and became known as Manhattan Park.

When the Allentown and Bethlehem Rapid Traction Company took ownership of the area from Thomas Ritter, it was renamed The Greater Central Park. Included in the park was a zoo with a large collection of animals, including elephants.

On July 2, 1893, the park opened as Rittersville Park, offering 40 acres of walking trails. It was built in a wooded area with picnic groves, walking paths, a few amusements, theaters and food stands. The first rides were a carousel, a toboggan chute, and the "Razzle-Dazzle".

Around 1898, the zoo closed and the owner of the Manhattan Hotel bought two monkeys from the zookeeper. One of the monkeys reportedly set fire to the hotel, though it was rebuilt the same year. The new Manhattan Hotel prospered, as it had one of the largest outdoor theaters in the state at the time.

Central Park hosted family reunions and picnics for businesses, clubs, and churches. A large sandbox, swings, and rides provided amusement for children. Among the events held in the park was the baby parade.

When the Allentown-Kutztown Traction Company completed its trolley line from Allentown to Kutztown in 1899, the company added a stop at Dorney Park & Wildwater Kingdom, Central Park's main competitor in the area.

=== 20th century ===
The sign and the last of the buildings of Central Park, which were demolished in the summer of 1964

In 1922, the Manhattan Hotel was torn down, and in its place the Manhattan Auditorium was built. An unsuccessful attempt was made in 1933 to establish the first supermarket in this area. It was later used for marathon dancing, auto shows, home shows, and roller skating, among other things.

The park was home to three roller coasters, including Derby Racer (1912-1950), Skyclone (1927-1951), and Sleigh Ride (1924-1951). Derby Racer was designed by John A. Miller and built by Frederick Ingersoll.

In 1946, the park was leased by the Transit Company to a private operator.

==== Closure ====
The park closed in December 1951, following destruction in several fires, and the land was vacant for nearly a decade.

In the early 1960s, it was sold for real estate development, and the last of Central Park was razed in 1964. A few abandoned concrete footings remain in wooded areas intermixed between clearings and homes and buildings which now exist on the site.

== See also ==
- List of historic places in Allentown, Pennsylvania
