= Bethlehem station (Central Railroad of New Jersey) =

Historic railway station, Bethelem, PA U.S.

Bethlehem
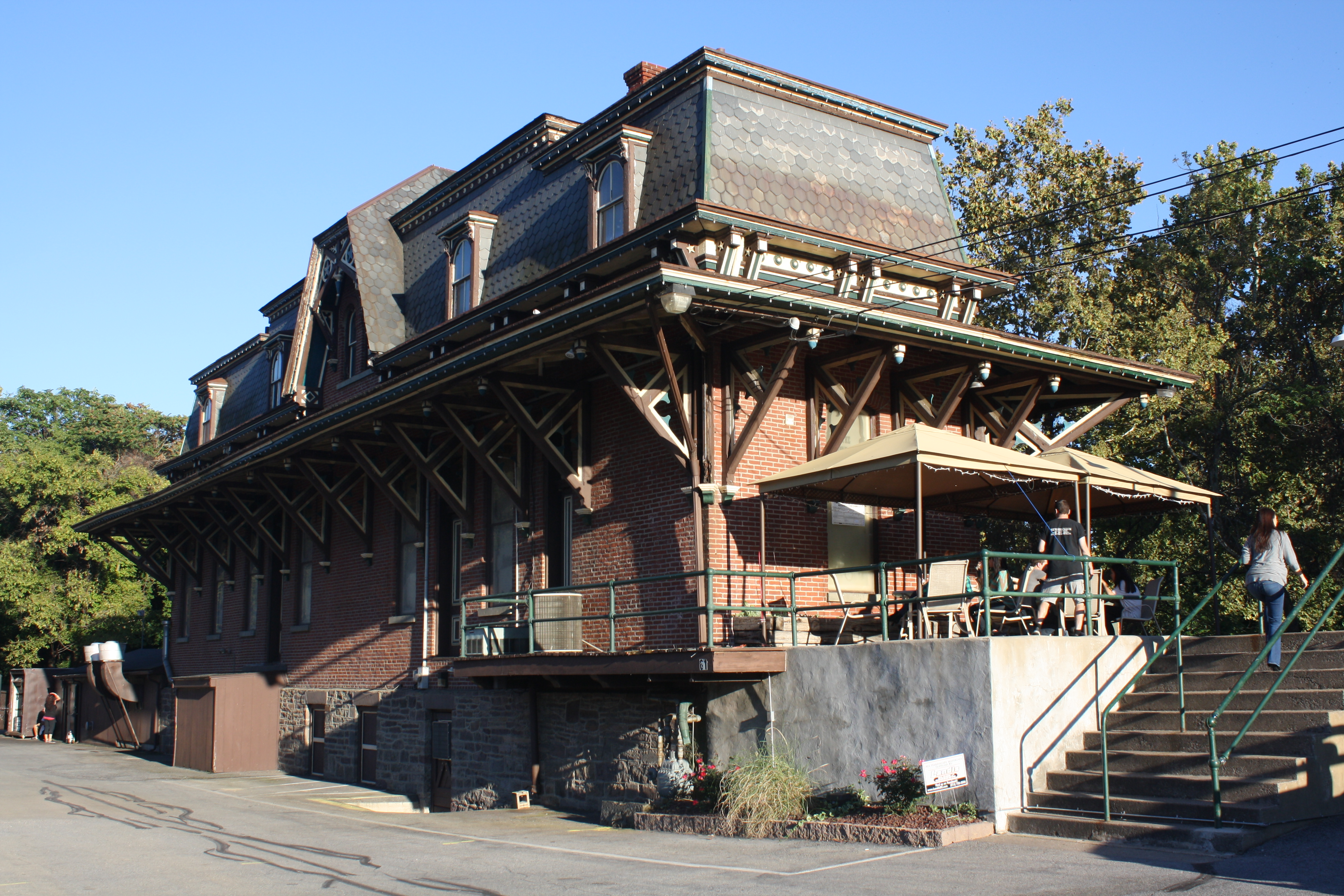
- The Wooden Match restaurant in the old station in 2013

General information
- Location: Bethlehem, Pennsylvania, U.S.
- Coordinates: 40°36′59.5″N 75°22′56.7″W
- Lines: Central Railroad of New Jersey: Lehigh and Susquehanna Division

History
- Opened: 1873
- Closed: August 18, 1967

Former services
Preceding station	Central Railroad of New Jersey	Following station
Allentown toward Scranton	Main Line	Phillipsburg toward Jersey City
Bethlehem Junction toward Scranton	Main Line	Freemansburg toward Jersey City
Location

Bethlehem is a disused train station in Bethlehem, Pennsylvania. It was constructed by the Central Railroad of New Jersey (CNJ) in 1873. Passenger service to the station ended in 1967. A restaurant opened within the station in 1976, and the building has continued to serve that role through several changes in ownership.

The station is located on the north side of the Lehigh River, near Monocacy Creek, east of Main Street and south of East Lehigh Street. Another disused station, Union Station, is located on the south side of the Lehigh River.

== History ==
=== 19th century ===
Passenger service to Bethlehem, Pennsylvania over the Lehigh and Susquehanna Railroad (L&S) began in 1868.

Three years later, in 1871, the Central Railroad of New Jersey leased the Lehigh and Susquehanna Railroad in an effort to better compete with the Lehigh Valley Railroad, whose tracks ran along the opposite side of the Lehigh River. The current three-story building opened in 1873.

=== 20th century ===
In 1962, the Bethlehem chapter of the U.S. Junior Chamber of Commerce leased the second floor in 1962 and undertook a restoration of the structure. Passenger service ended on August 18, 1967. The CNJ's Harrisburg-Jersey City, New Jersey Queen of the Valley, and local service to Jersey City, New Jersey were the last trains out of the station.

The Lehigh Street Depot restaurant, later known as the "Main Street Depot", opened on the first floor in 1976. Conrail, successor to the CNJ, formally sold the property to the restaurant owners in 1982.

=== 21st century ===
The Main Street Depot closed in 2010, and a new restaurant, "The Wooden Match", opened in 2011.
