= Baltimore, Philadelphia and New York Railroad =

The Baltimore, Philadelphia and New York Railroad was a paper railroad of the 1870s, vaguely projected to construct a new line between Baltimore and New York via Philadelphia. It did very little construction work, except for a few miles of grading from Relay House, on the Northern Central Railroad, through Towson, Maryland to the Gunpowder River. It merged with the bankrupt Wilmington and Reading Railroad in 1875, but failed to attract further investment to complete its own line. The two railroads were both reorganized separately after foreclosures. Most of the grade was sold to the Baltimore and Delta Railway.

== Original plan ==
The first precursor to the Baltimore, Philadelphia and New York was the State Line and Juniata Railroad. It was originally incorporated in Pennsylvania on April 5, 1870, to run from the Maryland state line up Licking Creek in Franklin County to Mount Union in Huntingdon County. Initially promoted by John Dougherty and other industrialists of Huntingdon and Fulton Counties, it attracted little backing and was dropped in favor of other proposals. A supplement to the charter on May 18, 1871 gave it the power to build any route in the state, and another on March 6, 1872, to build branch lines. These astonishingly broad powers were potentially useful to other railroads.

Some of the Fulton County incorporators opened subscription books in Philadelphia, where William O. Leslie took up 9,962 of the 10,000 authorized shares—but never paid in on his subscription, it not being required at that time. The railroad was organized on April 23, 1872. Leslie became the general superintendent and began a vigorous campaign to promote the railroad. The general plan seems to have been to extend through the southern Pennsylvania counties to Philadelphia, with a line running northeast and crossing the Delaware River around Morrisville, Pennsylvania to connect with some unspecified New Jersey railroad, and another line running between Philadelphia and Baltimore. To obtain the rights to build through Maryland, Leslie obtained a charter for the Maryland and Pennsylvania Railroad in September 1872, to run from Baltimore to the Pennsylvania state line at Octoraro Creek. He successfully raised a mortgage and grading work began by November 1872. The line was largely graded from Relay House, a junction on the Northern Central Railroad, northeast through Towson as far as the Gunpowder River. Closer to Philadelphia, the Chester Creek and Brandywine Railroad was incorporated on August 11, 1873 by a group of Philadelphia investors connected with the State Line and Juniata, to run from the mouth of Pocopson Creek (where it could connect with the Wilmington and Reading Railroad) to the West Chester and Philadelphia Railroad at Street Road station, and commenced running surveys. A small amount of right-of-way was graded from the West Chester and Philadelphia just north of Street Road station to the proposed crossing of Chester Creek.

The Panic of 1873 was fatal to many speculative railroads. Construction on the Chester Creek and Brandywine was suspended in early 1874. The threat of foreclosure in September 1874 led to a suspension of construction on the Maryland and Pennsylvania. On December 7, 1874, the State Line and Juniata, Chester Creek and Brandywine, and Maryland and Pennsylvania were all consolidated as the Baltimore, Philadelphia and New York Railroad. Leslie ran extensive surveys in Chester and Delaware Counties and obtained releases for right-of-way, representing the Baltimore, Philadelphia and New York as well-capitalized and soon to be completed.

== Merger ==
Leslie obtained the confidence of Robert Frazer, president of the bankrupt Wilmington and Reading Railroad. The claims of the bondholders would leave nothing for that railroad's stockholders after a reorganization, and Frazer persuaded the Wilmington and Reading's stockholders to agree to a consolidation with the Baltimore, Philadelphia and New York, which was effected on May 13, 1875. Local newspapers expressed a persistent hope that the Baltimore and Ohio Railroad would finance the railroad's construction to obtain a wholly owned line into Pennsylvania to compete with the Pennsylvania Railroad, or that the railroad's bonds could easily be sold in London. These hopes were not realized. Furthermore, unhappy landowners had complained to the Pennsylvania legislature about the company's dilatory progress. It responded by passing a resolution instructing the Attorney General to begin quo warranto proceedings to revoke the overbroad Baltimore, Philadelphia and New York charter.

== Reorganization ==
The grading, property, and franchises of the company in Baltimore County, Maryland were sold by the sheriff in 1877 to satisfy the Maryland and Pennsylvania's debts of over $14,000 to Walter Scott, the contractor who did the grading. Scott bought it up for $1,524, intending to complete the line to Towson, but did not do so. In 1878 or 1879, he sold the portion of the grade from Towson to Swann Lake to the Baltimore and Delta Railway for $9,500. This eventually became part of the narrow gauge Maryland and Pennsylvania Railroad (a later corporation, formed 1901) and was operated until 1958. Some of the unfinished grading still exists descending Towson Run to Lake Roland.

The mortgage bonds for the Pennsylvania part of the railroad were foreclosed on, and it was reorganized on May 18, 1878 as the Maryland and Delaware River Railroad. The directors included Leslie and several of the former Wilmington and Reading directors. William H. Bell, a railroad promoter from Branchville, New Jersey, assumed the presidency. By 1883, it had ceased to hold stockholders' and directors' meetings, and ceased to file reports with the state after that year.
