= Lebanon Valley Branch =

Overview
- Status: Merged into the Harrisburg Line
- Owner: Lebanon Valley Railroad (1857–1858); Philadelphia and Reading Railroad (1858–1896); Philadelphia and Reading Railway (1896–1924); Reading Company (1924–1976)

History
- Opened: 13 July 1857
- Conveyed to Conrail: 1 April 1976

Technical
- Line length: 53.4 mi (85.9 km)
- Track gauge: 1,435 mm (4 ft 8 1/2 in) standard gauge

The Lebanon Valley Branch was a railway line in Pennsylvania. Built between 1857–1858, it linked the cities of Harrisburg and Reading. It was part of the Reading Company system from its completion until 1976, when it was conveyed to Conrail. Under Conrail, the branch was merged with part of the former Reading Main Line to become the Harrisburg Line. It remains an important freight route.

== History ==
The Lebanon Valley Railroad completed the line between Reading and Lebanon on July 13, 1857. It was extended further west to Hummelstown on July 30, and finally to Harrisburg on January 18, 1858. Under the Lebanon Valley Railroad the line was single-tracked. The Philadelphia and Reading Railroad acquired the company and its assets on March 20, 1858. The branch remained within the Reading system through multiple reorganizations until 1976, when it was one of many Reading lines conveyed to Conrail. Conrail merged the line with the Reading–Philadelphia portion of the former Reading Main Line to create the Harrisburg Line. The line was conveyed to the Norfolk Southern Railway in the 1999 Conrail split.

== Passenger service ==
The Lebanon Valley Branch, together with the East Pennsylvania Branch, the Lehigh and Susquehanna Railroad, and the Central Railroad of New Jersey (CNJ) main line, created a direct route between Harrisburg and Jersey City, New Jersey, bypassing Philadelphia. The most famous service on this route was the Queen of the Valley, a joint venture of the Reading and the CNJ. The Queen of the Valley ceased running west of Allentown, Pennsylvania, on April 28, 1963, after the loss of mail contracts, ending passenger service on the Lebanon Valley Branch.
