= Queen of the Valley =

Former US train route

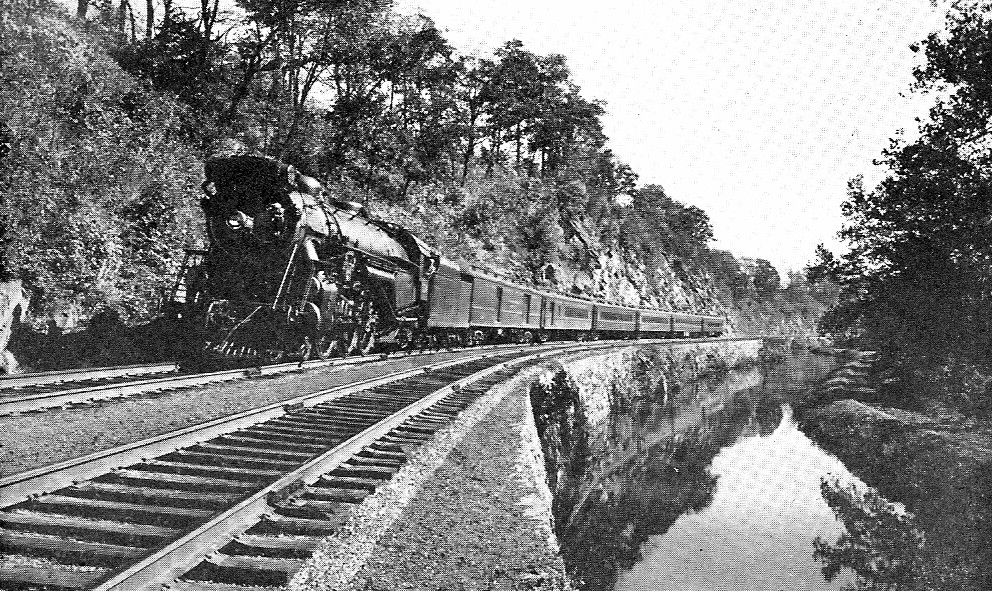
- Queen of the Valley, circa 1930s, including mail car and passenger revenue cars

Overview
- Service type: Inter-city rail
- Status: Discontinued
- Locale: Northeastern United States
- First service: 1911
- Last service: 1967
- Former operator: Central Railroad of New Jersey/Reading Railroad

Route
- Termini: Jersey City, New Jersey; Harrisburg, Pennsylvania
- Distance travelled: 179.5 miles (288.9 km)
- Average journey time: 4 hours, 47 minutes, westbound; 4 hours, 18 minutes, eastbound
- Service frequency: Daily, except Sunday (1936); daily (1961)
- Train numbers: 199 (westbound) and 192 (eastbound)

On-board services
- Seating arrangements: Coach
- Catering facilities: Dining-Club car
- Observation facilities: Parlor car (1936)
- Other facilities: Mail car

Technical
- Track gauge: 4 ft 8 1/2 in (1,435 mm)

The Queen of the Valley was a named train of the Central Railroad of New Jersey (CNJ) that ran between Jersey City, New Jersey, and Harrisburg, Pennsylvania, via the Lehigh Valley and Reading. The train took about 4 1/2 hours to traverse the 179.5-mile (288.9 km) route, the longest in the CNJ system, exceeding the Atlantic City-bound Blue Comet. First operated in 1911, it was the longest-running train of the CNJ when discontinued in 1967.

== Route ==
From Communipaw Terminal in Jersey City, the Queen of the Valley traveled south to Bayonne, but did not have any stops until the train's later years, traversed the harbor at Elizabethport, headed west along the CNJ's Main Line. It continued past Elizabeth's CNJ station, Plainfield Station, to High Point station and Hampton, the end point for the regular NJ Transit Raritan Valley Line commuter service.

From there, the route continued to Phillipsburg's Union Station, Easton, Bethlehem's Bethlehem Station, and Allentown's Allentown Station.

From Allentown, the train traveled along the territory of the Reading Railroad, continuing west to Reading, stopping at the Reading Outer station, and then to Lebanon and terminating in Harrisburg.

== History ==
In the mid-1930s the Queen of the Valley ran six days a week. In the early 1960s it was daily in operation.

In 1963, the route was shortened from Harrisburg and Reading to Allentown, owing to the loss of mail contracts. Following the creation of the new Aldene Connection in 1967 and the closure of the CNJ Terminal in New Jersey, the train was terminated. However, some commuter service on the Allentown to Newark via the new Aldene Connection continued.
