= Harrisburg Line =

Rail line in Pennsylvania, U.S.

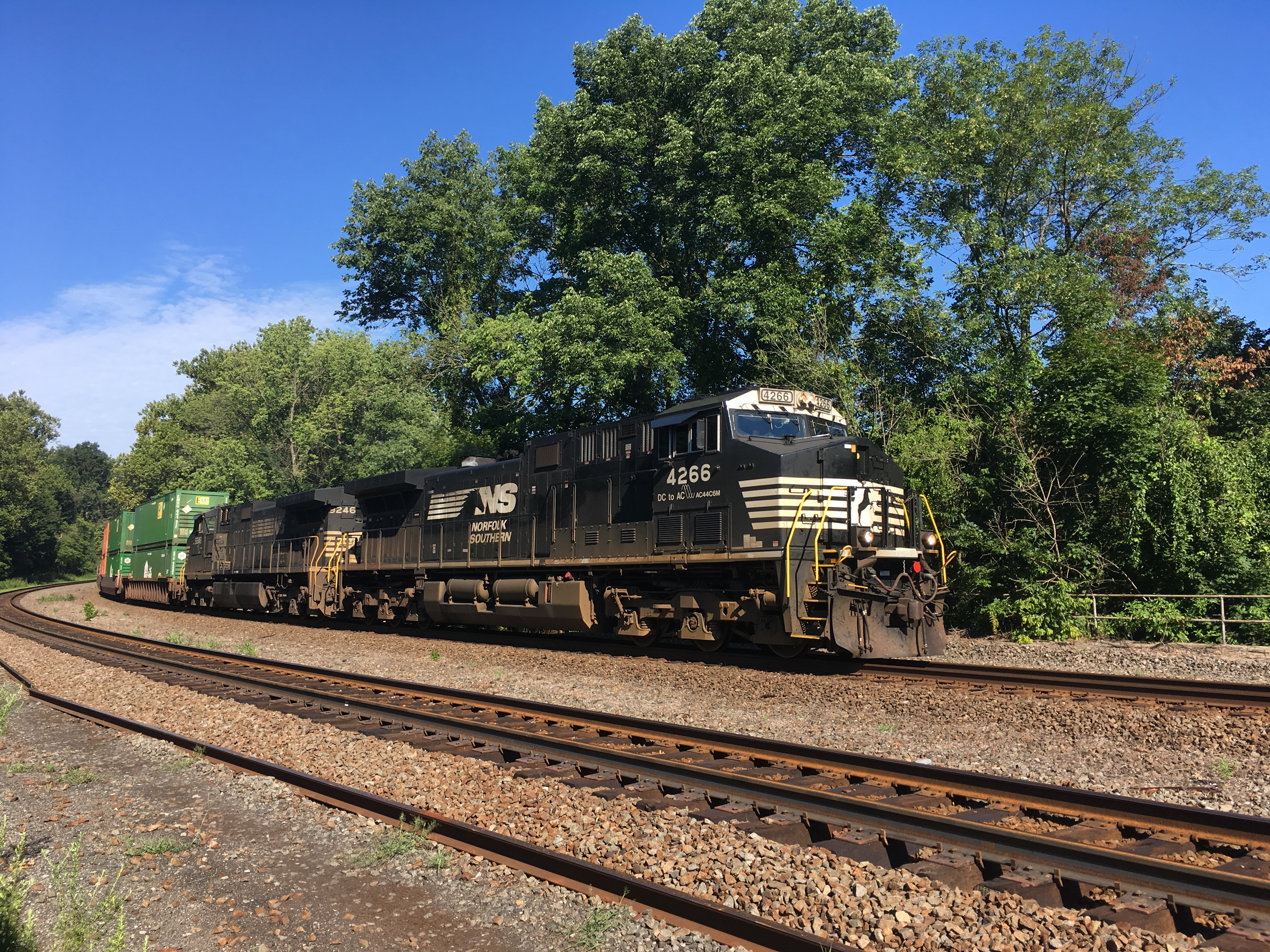
- Eastbound Norfolk Southern intermodal train on the Harrisburg Line in Valley Forge, Pennsylvania; train traveling on Harrisburg Line's Reading Company main line trackage.

Overview
- Status: Active
- Owner: Norfolk Southern Railway (1999–present); Conrail (1976–1999)
- Locale: Eastern Pennsylvania
- Termini: CP-River in Philadelphia, Pennsylvania; CP-Harrisburg in Harrisburg, Pennsylvania

Service
- Type: Freight rail
- System: Norfolk Southern Railway (1999–present); Conrail (1976–1999)

History
- Opened: April 1, 1976; the line’s oldest trackage opened on July 16, 1838.

Technical
- Number of tracks: 1-2
- Track gauge: 4 ft 8 1/2 in (1,435 mm) standard gauge

The Harrisburg Line is a rail line owned and operated by the Norfolk Southern Railway (NS) in the U.S. state of Pennsylvania. The line runs from Philadelphia (HP 5.2) west to Harrisburg (HP 112.9).

The Harrisburg Line was formed the day Conrail began operations, April 1, 1976, from three former Reading Company lines: the original namesake main line to Reading, Pennsylvania, the Reading Belt Branch, and the Lebanon Valley Branch.

Today, the Harrisburg Line is owned by Norfolk Southern Railway under their Harrisburg Division. The Harrisburg Line runs through two tunnels, the Flat Rock Tunnel in Lower Merion Township and the Black Rock Tunnel in Phoenixville.

== History ==
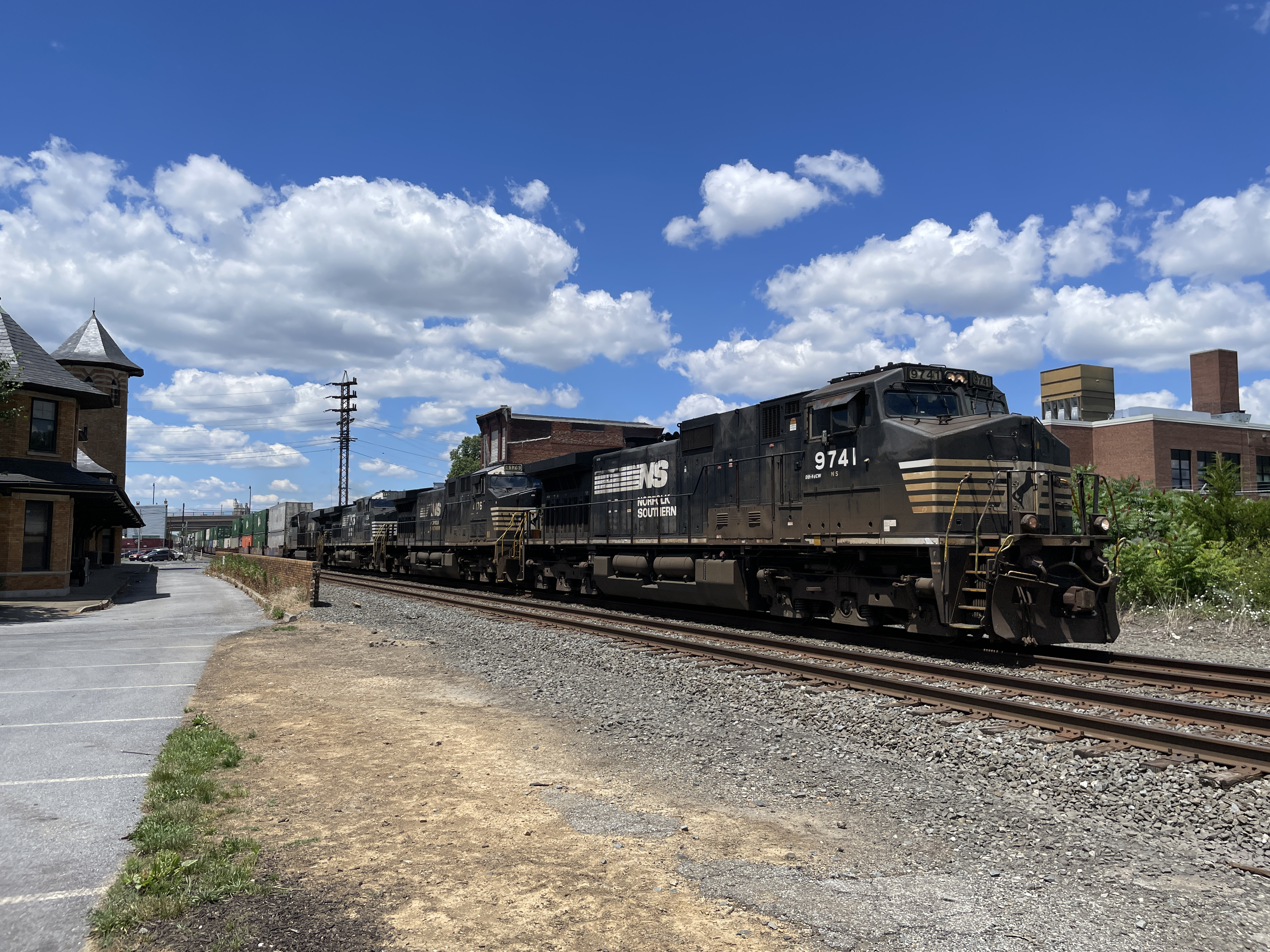
Eastbound intermodal train in Lebanon

The Harrisburg Line, as a single rail line, was formed on April 1, 1976 from three existing Reading Company lines: the original main line from Reading to Philadelphia, the Reading Belt Branch between Reading and Birdsboro (parallel to the main line), and the Lebanon Valley Railroad from Reading to Harrisburg.

The Reading Company main line was established on July 16, 1838, between Reading and Norristown by the Reading Company's Philadelphia and Reading Rail Road. The Reading to Norristown route is the Reading Company main line's original route/right of way. The Reading Company main line was extended to Philadelphia, Pennsylvania from Norristown on December 9, 1839. The Reading Company main line was later extended to the north from Reading to Port Clinton.

The Lebanon Valley Branch was opened by the Lebanon Valley Railroad from Reading to Harrisburg, and the line and its railroad were purchased by the Reading Company on March 20, 1858. The Lebanon Valley Railroad built the Lebanon Valley Branch a few months before it was purchased by the Reading Company.

The Reading Company's railroad properties along with the Reading Company main line and the Lebanon Valley Branch became part of the Consolidated Rail Corporation (Conrail) on April 1, 1976, and the Reading Company main line's Reading to Philadelphia trackage and all of the Lebanon Valley Branch were combined into a new rail line which became known as the Harrisburg Line. The Reading to Port Clinton trackage was separated from the Reading Company main line and was later sold to Reading Blue Mountain and Northern Railroad. The newly created Harrisburg Line continued under Conrail until the late 1990s.

The Harrisburg Line became part of Norfolk Southern Railway on June 1, 1999, after the breakup of Conrail. Other Conrail lines such as the Lehigh Line, which was previously the main line of the Lehigh Valley Railroad. On the same day, the Central Railroad of New Jersey used trackage, the Pittsburgh Line, Reading Line, Buffalo Line, Lurgan Branch, and Royalton Branch became Norfolk Southern lines.

== Connections ==
At its east end, near the East Falls neighborhood in Philadelphia, the Harrisburg Line junctions with CSX Transportation's Trenton Subdivision and the Philadelphia Subdivision. Its west end in Harrisburg, Pennsylvania is at a junction with the NS Pittsburgh Line, the NS Lurgan Branch, the NS Royalton Branch, and Amtrak's Keystone Corridor (Philadelphia to Harrisburg Main Line).

The line junctions the Morrisville Line (indirectly) at Norristown, Pennsylvania and the Reading Line near Reading, Pennsylvania. Also at Norristown, the line junctions with SEPTA’s Manayunk/Norristown Line.

== See also ==
- List of Norfolk Southern Railway lines
