= Wilmington and Northern Branch =

Overview
- Owner: See #Summary of ownership

History
- Opened: 1869

Technical
- Line length: 63.5 mi (102.2 km)

The Wilmington and Northern Branch is a partially abandoned railway line in the states of Delaware and Pennsylvania. It was constructed between 1869 and 1870 by the Wilmington and Reading Railroad, a predecessor of the Wilmington and Northern Railroad. At its fullest extent it connected Reading, Pennsylvania, with Wilmington, Delaware. The Philadelphia and Reading Railway leased the line in 1900. With the Reading Company's bankruptcy and the creation of Conrail in 1976 the line's ownership fragmented, and the section between Coatesville, Pennsylvania, and Birdsboro, Pennsylvania, has been abandoned.

== Route ==
From Reading, Pennsylvania, to Birdsboro, Pennsylvania, the line followed the left bank of the Schuylkill River, running parallel to the Pennsylvania Railroad's Schuylkill Branch. At Birdsboro, the line turned south, eventually picking up the West Branch Brandywine Creek and following it into Coatesville, Pennsylvania, and an interchange with the Pennsylvania Main Line. From Coatesville, the line continued south to Wilmington, Delaware, where it interchanged with the Baltimore and Ohio Railroad. Passenger trains used the B&O's Water Street station in Wilmington.

== History ==
The Wilmington and Reading Railroad, formed in 1866, completed the line between Wilmington and Coatesville in 1869, and extended to Birdsboro in 1870, where it met the Philadelphia and Reading Railroad. In 1874 it built its own line into Reading, along the left bank of the Schuylkill. The Wilmington and Reading was reorganized as the Wilmington and Northern Railroad on April 3, 1877. The Philadelphia and Reading leased the company and its lines in 1900, but no merger ever occurred. Following the lease, the section between Reading and Birdsboro was considered part of the Reading Belt Branch, a freight bypass around Reading, although the Wilmington and Northern remained the owner.

The Wilmington and Northern's days as a (paper) railroad company ended with the Reading Company's final bankruptcy and conveying of most of that company's lines, both those directly owned and those leased, to Conrail. The northern part of the line, between Coatesville and Birdsboro, was conveyed to Conrail. The "Reading estate", the successor corporation to the bankrupt Reading Company, continued to own the portion between Coatesville and Wilmington, and Conrail operated services there under subsidy.

The shortline Octoraro Railway began operating the southern portion in 1977, again under subsidy from Pennsylvania and Delaware. The state of Pennsylvania, with financial support from the federal government, acquired the line from Coatesville to the Delaware border in 1981, leaving the Octoraro Railway in place as the operator. In 1982, the Lukens Steel Company founded the Brandywine Valley Railroad to serve its steel mill in the Coatesville area. The Brandywine bought a 3.65-mile (5.87 km) section of the line from Conrail, extending from the interchange track with the former Pennsylvania main line south to Modena, Pennsylvania.

The Octoraro Railway ceased operations in 1994 and was replaced by the Delaware Valley Railway. The Delaware Valley Railway, a RailAmerica subsidiary, continued to operate the former Wilmington and Northern Branch between Modena and Elsmere Junction, albeit without a subsidy from Pennsylvania. The Delaware Valley itself ceased operating in 1999, and the Brandywine Valley Railroad took over operations over the line, subsequently buying the line from Modena to the Delaware border from the state of Pennsylvania in 2001.

In 2003 Bethlehem Steel, successor to Lukens, went bankrupt and was acquired by International Steel Group (ISG). ISG formed ISG Railways to acquire all of Bethlehem Steel's shortline railroads, including the Brandywine Valley Railroad. In 2005 East Penn Railways acquired both the Delaware section of line from the Reading estate and the 17 miles (27 km) from the Delaware border to Modena from ISG, leaving the Brandywine Valley Railroad in control of the industrial trackage in Coatesville. East Penn Railways and Penn Eastern Rail Lines merged in 2007 to become the East Penn Railroad.

North of Coatesville, Conrail filed to abandon the line in 1984. All that remains is an industrial spur leaving the Harrisburg Line of the Norfolk Southern Railway at Birdsboro to serve a quarry.

=== Summary of ownership ===
The Wilmington and Northern Railroad and its predecessor the Wilmington and Reading Railroad owned the lines from their construction until 1976. Following the 1900 lease, the Philadelphia and Reading Railway and its successor the Reading Company operated the line. After 1976 and the creation of Conrail ownership fragmented:

- Reading–Birdsboro: conveyed to Conrail and then to the Norfolk Southern Railway in 1999.
- Birdsboro–Coatesville: conveyed to Conrail and almost completely abandoned in the 1980s. Norfolk Southern gained the remnant around Birdsboro in 1999.
- Coatesville–Modena: conveyed to Conrail, who sold it to the Brandywine Valley Railroad in 1982.
- Modena–Delaware state line: bought by the state of Pennsylvania from the Reading estate in 1981; bought by the Brandywine Valley Railroad in 2001; bought by East Penn Railways in 2005.
- Delaware state line–Elsmere Junction: bought by East Penn Railways from the Reading estate in 2005.
- Elsmere Junction–Wilmington: conveyed to Conrail and then to CSX Transportation in 1999.
