= East Pennsylvania Railroad =

Defunct railroad in the state of Pennsylvania

Overview
- Locale: Pennsylvania, U.S.
- Dates of operation: 1856–1976
- Successor: Conrail

Technical
- Track gauge: 4 ft 8 1/2 in (1,435 mm)

The East Pennsylvania Railroad is a defunct railroad which operated in the state of Pennsylvania. In 1859, it opened a line between Reading and Allentown. The Philadelphia and Reading Railroad, a predecessor to the Reading Company, leased the line in 1869. As the East Pennsylvania Branch, the line was part of the Reading's through route between Harrisburg and Allentown.

In 1976, the line was transferred to Conrail after the Reading Company's bankruptcy. It is now part of the Norfolk Southern Railway's Reading Line.

== History ==
=== 19th century ===
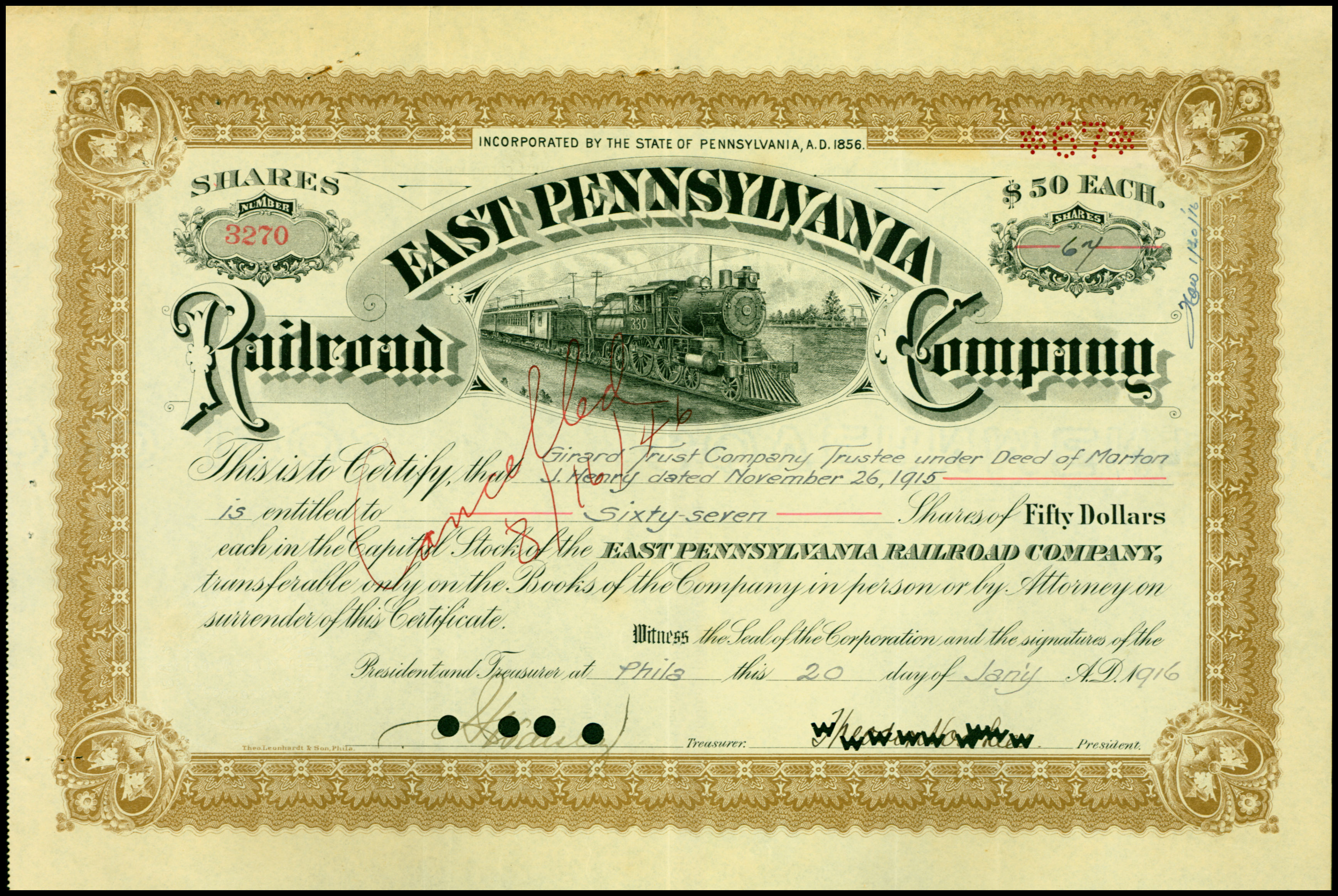
A share of the East Pennsylvania Railroad Company issued in January 1916

The East Pennsylvania Railroad was chartered on March 9, 1856, as the Reading and Lehigh Railroad, but was renamed in April 1857. It completed a line between Reading and Allentown on May 11, 1859. This line created a route between Harrisburg and New York City. Philadelphia and Reading Railroad, predecessor of the Reading Company, leased the line in 1869.

=== 20th century ===
In 1976, as part of the Reading Company's bankruptcy, the East Pennsylvania Railroad and the Reading were merged into Conrail.
