= Antietam (disambiguation) =

Antietam /ænˈtiːtəm/ may refer to:

== Places ==
=== Maryland ===
- Antietam, Maryland, an unincorporated community four miles south of the battlefield of the Battle of Antietam
  - Antietam Iron Furnace Site and Antietam Village
- Antietam Hall
- Antietam Creek, a tributary of the Potomac River in Pennsylvania and Western Maryland; source name for the battle
- Antietam National Battlefield, an American national park

=== Pennsylvania ===
- Antietam Creek (Schuylkill River), a tributary of the Schuylkill River
- Antietam Lake, a reservoir in Berks County

== Arts, entertainment, games and media ==
- Antietam (band), US indie rock band
- "Antietam", a song by Billy Corgan
- Antietam: The Bloodiest Day, 17 September 1862, a 1975 board wargame that simulates the American Civil War Battle
- Battleground 5: Antietam, a strategy computer game
- Sid Meier's Antietam!, a tactical computer game

== Military ==
- Battle of Antietam, a major American Civil War battle
- Maryland Campaign, also known as the Antietam Campaign, an American Civil War invasion
- USS Antietam, three US Navy ships
