= Warwick, Pennsylvania =

Unincorporated community in Pennsylvania, U.S.

Coordinates: 40.165056°N 75.783917°W

Warwick is an unincorporated community in northwestern Chester County, Pennsylvania, United States. It is located in Warwick Township just west of its municipal building. Routes 23 and 345 meet in the village, which serves as a gateway to French Creek State Park. Warwick is drained by the French Creek eastward into the Schuylkill River. It is served by the Elverson post office, which uses the zip code of 19520.

The community was named after Warwick, England, the ancestral home of an early settler.
