= Pennsylvania Route 345 =

State highway in Pennsylvania, US

Pennsylvania Route 345

Route information
- Maintained by PennDOT and Warwick Township
- Length: 13.436 mi (21.623 km)

Major junctions
- South end: PA 82 in West Nantmeal Township
- PA 401 in East Nantmeal Township; PA 23 in Warwick Township; PA 724 in Birdsboro
- North end: US 422 near Birdsboro

Location
- Country: United States
- State: Pennsylvania
- Counties: Chester, Berks

Highway system
- Pennsylvania State Route System; Interstate; US; State; Scenic; Legislative
← PA 344	→ PA 346

Pennsylvania Route 345 (PA 345) is a 13-mile-long (21 km) state highway in the U.S. state of Pennsylvania. The route runs from PA 82 in West Nantmeal Township, Chester County, north to U.S. Route 422 (US 422) near Birdsboro, Berks County. The route is a two-lane road its entire length, passing through the community of Warwick, Hopewell Furnace National Historic Site, French Creek State Park, and the borough of Birdsboro. PA 345 intersects PA 401 in East Nantmeal Township, PA 23 in Warwick, and PA 724 in Birdsboro. PA 345 was first designated by 1973 between PA 82 in West Nantmeal Township and PA 724 in Birdsboro. The route was extended north to US 422 in 2008, replacing a former section of PA 82 north of Birdsboro that was initially designated in 1928.

== Route description ==
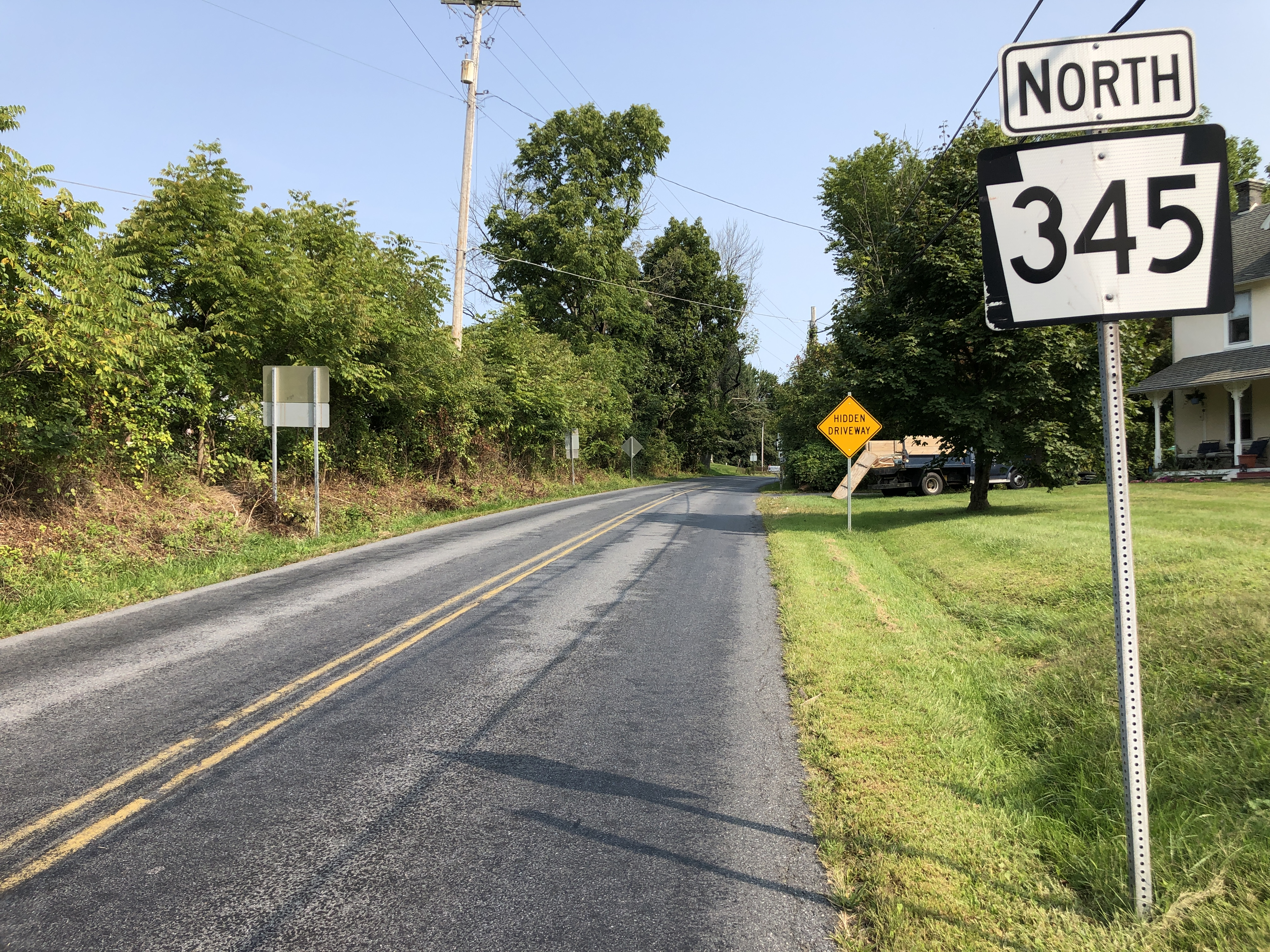
PA 345 northbound past PA 23 in Warwick Township

PA 345 begins at an intersection with PA 82 and Little Conestoga Road in the community of Loag in West Nantmeal Township, Chester County, heading northeast on two-lane undivided Bulltown Road. The road heads through agricultural areas and comes to a bridge over the Pennsylvania Turnpike (Interstate 76). The route crosses into East Nantmeal Township and passes woodland and homes, curving north to reach an intersection with PA 401. PA 345 passes between a pair of golf courses and enters Warwick Township, where it intersects PA 23. Past this, the route continues north before it turns east onto Warwick Road and passes through the residential community of Warwick. PA 345 turns north onto Pine Swamp Road and heads into a mix of farmland and woodland with some homes.

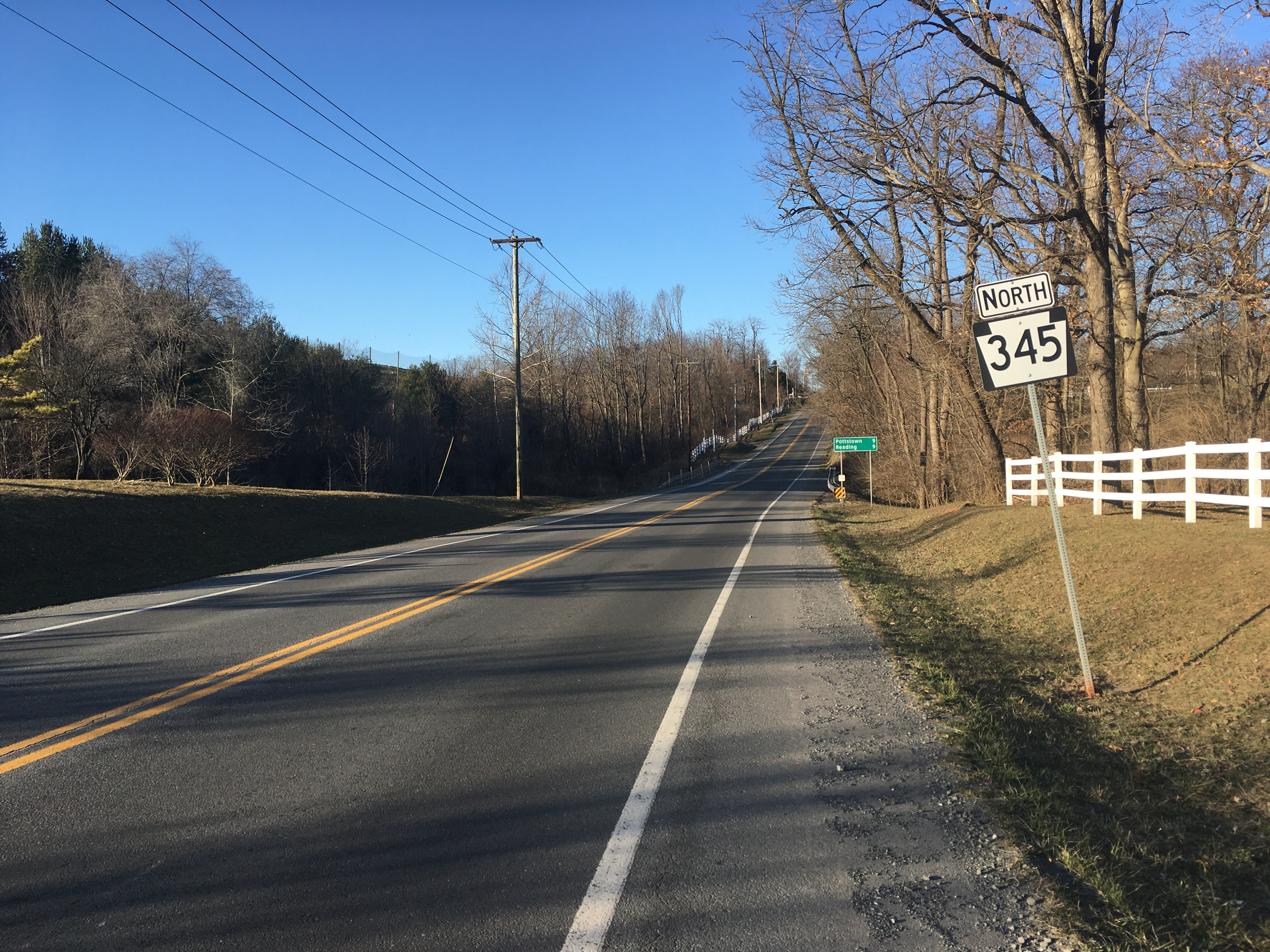
PA 345 northbound north of Birdsboro

PA 345 winds northeast into forested areas and enters Union Township in Berks County, where it heads through the Hopewell Furnace National Historic Site and crosses French Creek. The road curves to the northwest and continues into French Creek State Park, running through more dense forests. The route leaves the state park and winds north through the community of Kulptown, with the name changing to Chestnut Street. PA 345 turns northwest before it runs north along the border between the borough of Birdsboro to the west and Union Township to the east, passing through residential areas and heading to the west of Daniel Boone Area High School. The route comes to an intersection with PA 724, at which point it turns west into Birdsboro to form a concurrency with PA 724 on East Main Street. The road passes more homes and heads into the commercial center of Birdsboro, crossing Hay Creek. Both routes turn north onto North Furnace Street before PA 724 splits from PA 345 by heading to the west. PA 345 crosses the Schuylkill River into Exeter Township and soon passes over Norfolk Southern's Harrisburg Line. The route heads north on South Center Road and runs through residential areas and woods. In the community of Baumstown, PA 345 intersects the eastbound lanes of US 422 before it comes to its northern terminus at a junction with the westbound lanes of US 422.

== History ==
When Pennsylvania first legislated routes in 1911, present-day PA 345 was not part of a route. By 1928, the present alignment of the route existed as an unpaved road; the road was unnumbered south of Birdsboro and was numbered as part of PA 82 between Birdsboro and Baumstown. The portion of PA 82 between Birdsboro and Baumstown was paved by 1930. What is now PA 345 south of Birdsboro was paved by 1940. PA 345 was designated by 1973 to run from PA 82 in Loag north to PA 724 in Birdsboro. PA 345 was extended north to US 422 in Baumstown in 2008, heading west concurrent with PA 724 and replacing PA 82 between Birdsboro and Baumstown. This extension was concurrent with the truncation of the northern terminus of PA 82 from US 422 to PA 23 in Elverson due to washed out bridges along PA 82 south of Birdsboro.

== Major intersections ==
County	Location	mi	km	Destinations	Notes
Chester	West Nantmeal Township	0.000	0.000	PA 82 south	Continuation south
Chester	West Nantmeal Township	0.000	0.000	PA 82 north (Little Conestoga Road)	
Chester	East Nantmeal Township	1.759	2.831	PA 401 – Elverson, Ludwigs Corner	
Chester	Warwick Township	2.733	4.398	PA 23 (Ridge Road) – Elverson, Phoenixville	
Berks	Birdsboro	11.616	18.694	PA 724 east (East Main Street) – Phoenixville	South end of PA 724 concurrency
Berks	Birdsboro	12.267	19.742	PA 724 west (West Main Street) – Shillington	North end of PA 724 concurrency
Berks	Exeter Township	13.193	21.232	US 422 east – Pottstown	
Berks	Exeter Township	13.436	21.623	US 422 west (Benjamin Franklin Highway) – Mount Penn, Reading	Northern terminus
1.000 mi = 1.609 km; 1.000 km = 0.621 mi: Concurrency terminus
