= Ruth Zimmerman Natural Area =

Natural area in Pennsylvania

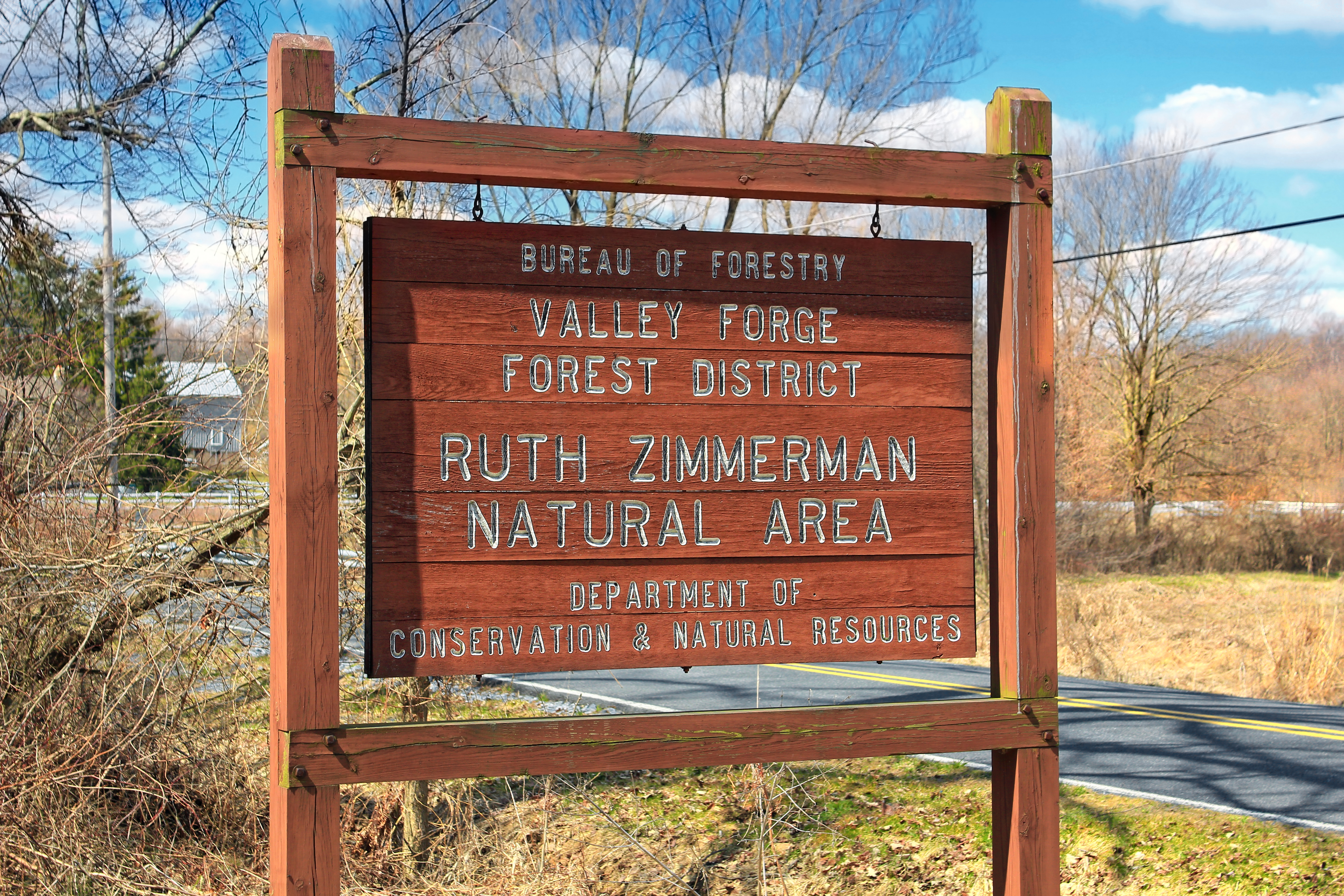

- Location within Pennsylvania
- Location: Berks County, Pennsylvania
- Nearest town: Oley
- Coordinates: 40°23′16″N 75°50′54″W
- Area: 33 acres (13 ha)

Ruth Zimmerman Natural Area is a 33-acre (13 ha) protected area in Berks County, Pennsylvania, United States. It is part of William Penn State Forest (formerly Valley Forge Forest District).

== Description ==
The Natural Area was established to protect a forested wetland that includes pin oaks and other oak species that are uncommon in Pennsylvania. It is named after its former landowner. The area consists of two tracts on either side of a paved road, and while there are no organized footpaths, visitors can easily walk through the area to view the trees. The tract on the south side of the road includes an upper tributary of Antietam Creek.
