= William Penn State Forest =

State forest in Pennsylvania, United States

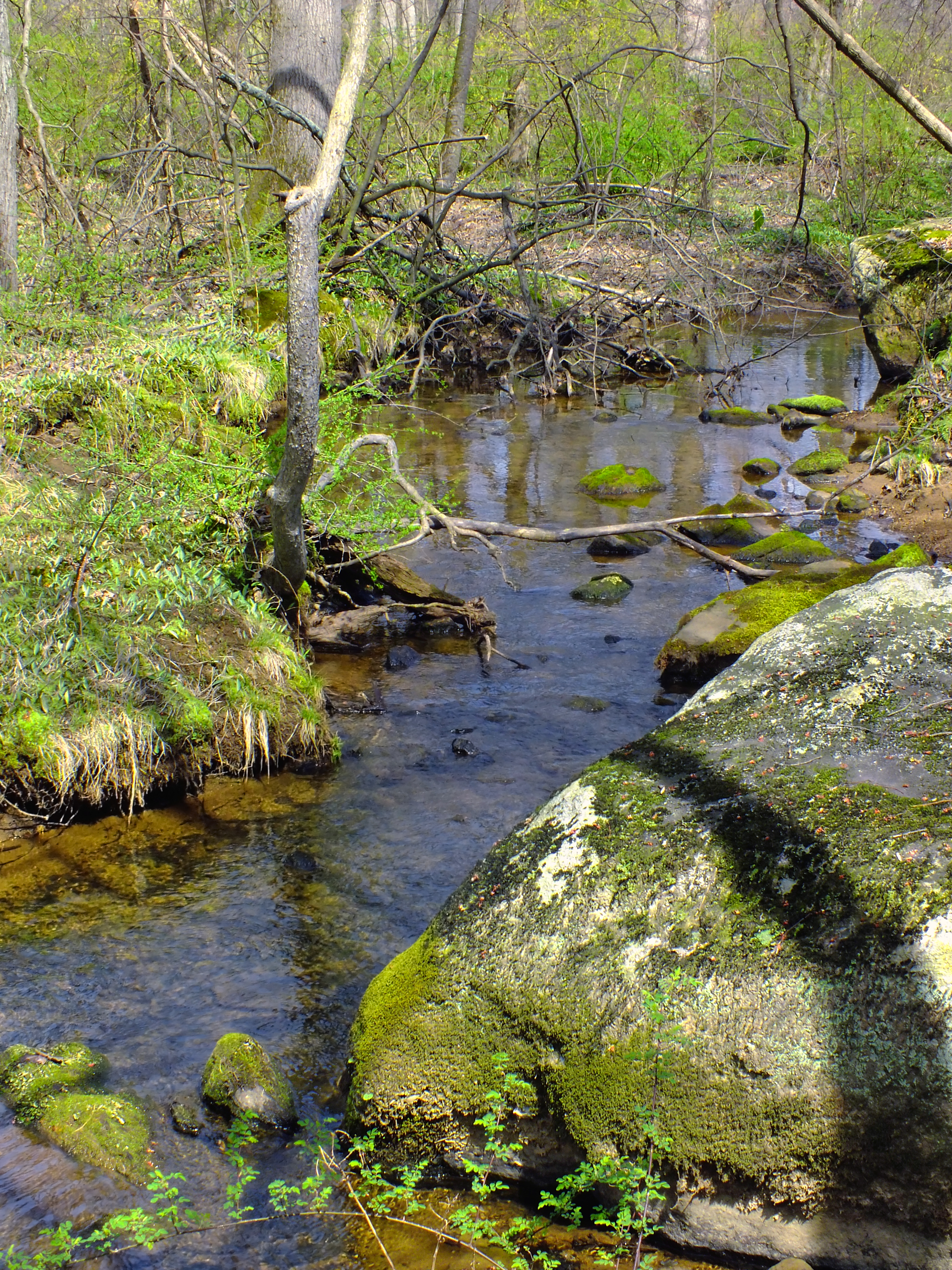
- Antietam Creek in the Ruth Zimmerman Natural Area of William Penn State Forest in Berks County.

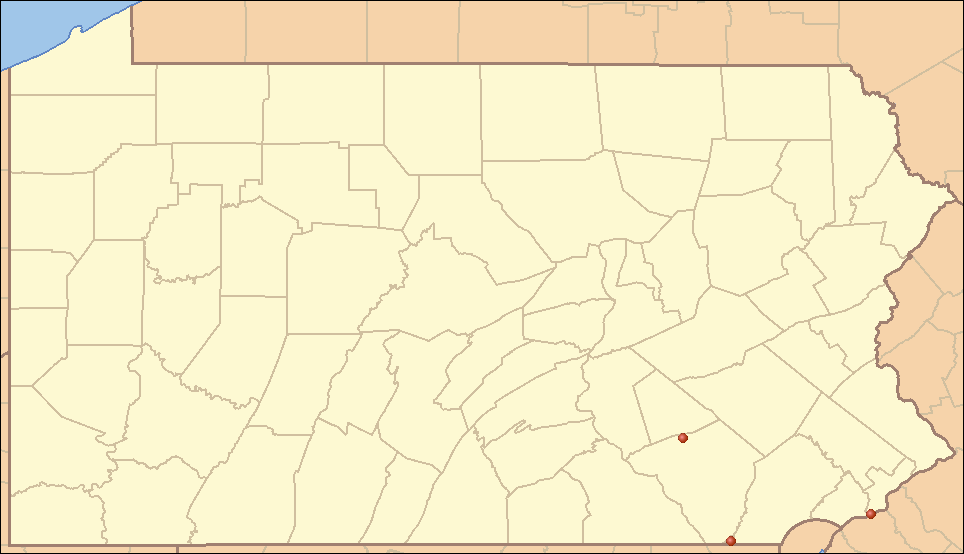
- Location of the three tracts of William Penn State Forest in Pennsylvania
- Location: Pennsylvania, United States
- Coordinates: 39°43′26″N 76°06′04″W
- Area: 901 acres (365 ha)
- Elevation: 239 ft (73 m)
- Established: January, 1935
- Named for: William Penn
- Governing body: Pennsylvania Department of Conservation and Natural Resources
- Website: William Penn State Forest

William Penn State Forest is a Pennsylvania State Forest in Pennsylvania Bureau of Forestry District #17. The main offices are located in Elverson in Chester County, Pennsylvania in the United States.

The forest is named for William Penn, the founder of Pennsylvania. It was originally named "Valley Forge State Forest", for the camp at Valley Forge in the American Revolutionary War. Valley Forge State Park was the first state park in Pennsylvania, and the headquarters of the state forest were located there as well. The state park was transferred to the National Park Service and became a federal park in 1976 for the American Bicentennial. The state forest retained the Valley Forge name for thirty one years.

After the July 1, 2005, realignment of Pennsylvania State Forest Districts, what was then Valley Forge State Forest and District #17 acquired the northern parts of Berks and Lehigh Counties from Weiser State Forest and District #18. In August 2007, "In a bid to eliminate public confusion over the name of the federal park and the state forest district, the Bureau of Forestry renamed the Valley Forge State Forest District in honor of one of Pennsylvania's first conservationists -- William Penn."

William Penn State Forest is located on 901 acres (365 ha) in ten tracts: 10 acres (4 ha) in Lancaster County; 200 acres (81 ha) on Little Tinicum Island in the Delaware River in Delaware County; and 602 acres (244 ha) of the Goat Hill Serpentine Barrens in Chester County. Also included are the David R. Johnson Natural Area in Bucks County and the Gibraltar Hill and George W. Wertz Tracts in Berks County. District #17 also includes Berks, Bucks, Lehigh, Montgomery, Northampton, and Philadelphia counties.

== History ==
William Penn State Forest was formed as a direct result of the depletion of the forests of Pennsylvania that took place during the mid-to-late 19th century. Conservationists like Dr. Joseph Rothrock became concerned that the forests would not regrow if they were not managed properly. Lumber and iron companies had harvested the old-growth forests for various reasons. They clear cut the forests and left behind nothing but dried tree tops and rotting stumps. The sparks of passing steam locomotives ignited wildfires that prevented the formation of second growth forests. The conservationists feared that the forest would never regrow if there was not a change in the philosophy of forest management. They called for the state to purchase land from the lumber and iron companies and the lumber and iron companies were more than willing to sell their land since that had depleted the natural resources of the forests. The changes began to take place in 1895 when Dr. Rothrock was appointed the first commissioner of the Pennsylvania Department of Forests and Waters, the forerunner of today's Pennsylvania Department of Conservation and Natural Resources. The Pennsylvania General Assembly passed a piece of legislation in 1897 that authorized the purchase of "unseated lands for forest reservations." This was the beginning of the State Forest system.

The first parcel of land that became William Penn State Forest was acquired in 1935 when the state bought 10 acres (4 ha) of land in Lancaster County from the heirs of the Cornwall Iron Furnace fortunes. The first 10 acres (40,000 m^{2}) contained the Cornwall fire tower which was built in 1923. The second land acquisition did not take place until November 1982 when Little Tinicum Island in the Delaware River was purchased at a cost of $100,000. In December 1982 a second tract of land was purchased. The Goat Hill Serpentine Barrens, consisting of 602 acres (244 ha), were purchased for $239,500 with financial aid from the Nature Conservancy. Both Little Tinicum Island and the Goat Hill Serpentine Barrens are home to unique ecological habitats.

== Neighboring state forest districts ==
The U.S. states of New Jersey, Delaware, and Maryland are to the east, south and southwest, respectively

- Delaware State Forest (north)
- Michaux State Forest (west)
- Weiser State Forest (northwest)

== Nearby state parks ==
Although no state parks are located within William Penn State Forest, there are fifteen state parks in District #17:

- Delaware Canal State Park
- Evansburg State Park
- Fort Washington State Park
- French Creek State Park
- Marsh Creek State Park
- Neshaminy State Park
- Nockamixon State Park
- Nolde Forest Environmental Education Center
- Norristown Farm State Park
- Ridley Creek State Park
- Benjamin Rush State Park
- Ralph Stover State Park
- Susquehannock State Park
- Tyler State Park
- White Clay Creek Preserve

== Natural areas ==
- David R. Johnson Natural Area
- Little Tinicum Island Natural Area
- Ruth Zimmerman Natural Area

== See also ==
- Philadelphia Lazaretto
