= Kulptown, Pennsylvania =

Unincorporated community in Pennsylvania, US

- Unincorporated community
- Location within Pennsylvania Location within the United States
- Coordinates: 40°23′01″N 75°43′58″W
- Country: United States
- State: Pennsylvania
- County: Berks
- Township: Union
- Time zone: UTC-5 (EST)
  - Summer (DST): UTC-4 (EDT)
- Area code: 610

Kulptown is an unincorporated community in Berks County, Pennsylvania. Pennsylvania Route 345 runs through the town, which is located just south of the borough of Birdsboro. Located in Union Township, the village is served by the Daniel Boone Area School District.
