= David R. Johnson Natural Area =

Natural area in Pennsylvania

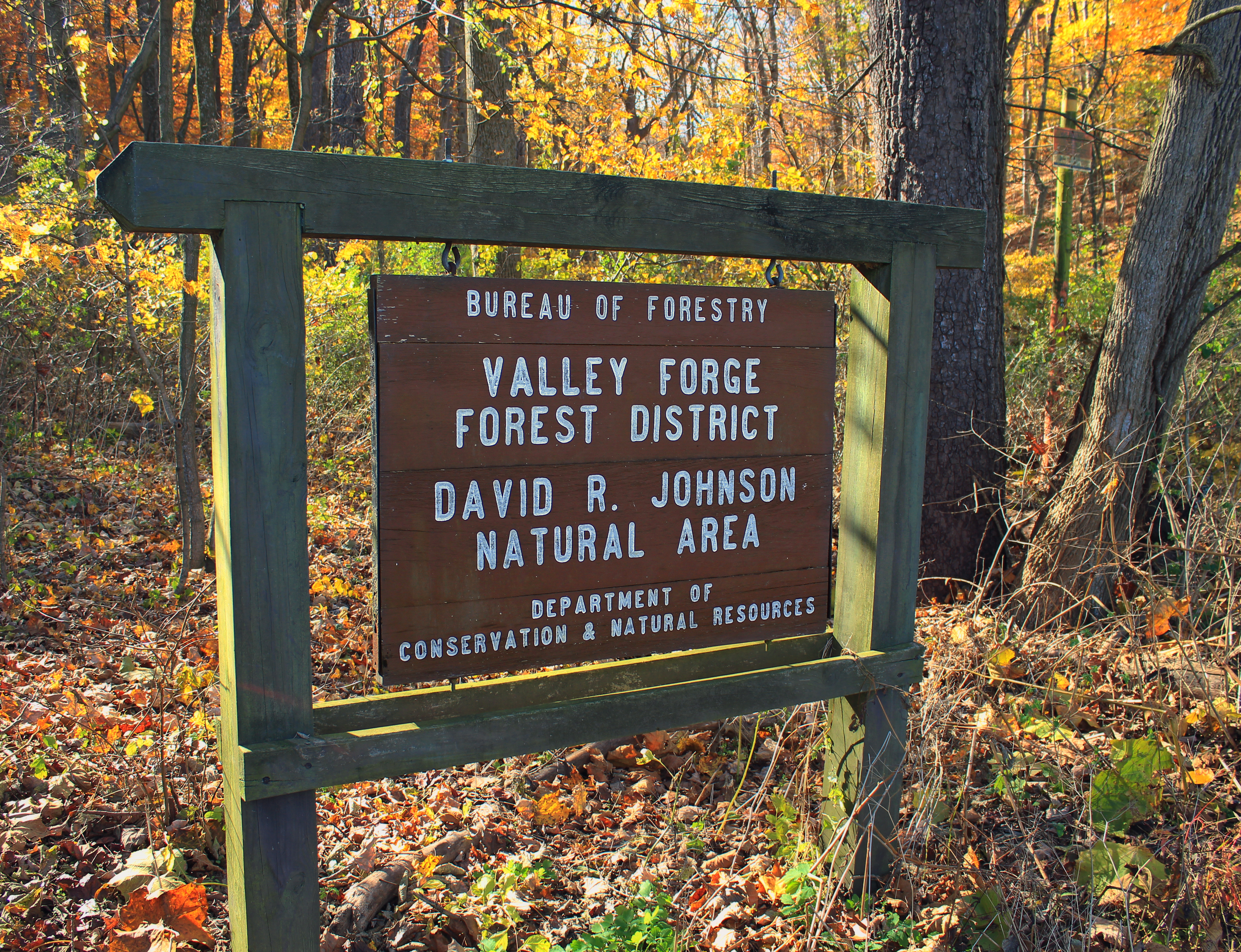

- Location within Pennsylvania
- Location: Bucks County, Pennsylvania
- Nearest town: New Hope
- Coordinates: 40°24′08″N 74°59′22″W
- Area: 56 acres (23 ha)

David R. Johnson Natural Area is a 56-acre (23 ha) protected area in Bucks County, Pennsylvania, United States. It is part of William Penn State Forest (formerly Valley Forge Forest District).

== Description ==
The Natural Area was established to protect a grove of tree species that are more commonly found in northern Pennsylvania and are rare in the southeastern corner of the state. It is named after its former landowner. The area encompasses surrounds the sides of an unnamed stream, plus a narrow area alongside PA 32, and is surrounded by private land. It has been noted for some of the best fall foliage experiences in southeastern Pennsylvania. The area provides a migratory habitat for several bird species.
