= Little Tinicum Island Natural Area =

Natural area in Pennsylvania

- Location within Pennsylvania
- Location: Delaware County, Pennsylvania
- Nearest town: Essington
- Coordinates: 39°51′15″N 75°17′58″W
- Area: 80 acres (32 ha)

Little Tinicum Island Natural Area is an 80-acre (32 ha) protected area in Delaware County, Pennsylvania, United States. It is part of William Penn State Forest.

== Description ==
The Natural Area was established to protect Little Tinicum Island in the Delaware River, outside of Essington. The island features wetlands that house several species of birds that are not commonly found in Pennsylvania. The island is also known for its unique tidal mud flat ecosystem, and has been noted for hosting a population of great blue herons. It has been named a special reptile and amphibian protection area by Pennsylvania due to its robust populations of snakes and turtles. The island has also been noted for its unique car-free outdoor experience in a developed metropolitan and industrial area, thanks to its many uncommon plant species. The island and Natural Area can only be reached by boat.
