= Antietam Lake =

- Location within Pennsylvania Location within the United States
- Location: Antietam Park, Berks County, Pennsylvania
- Coordinates: 40°21′22″N 075°52′12″W
- Type: Reservoir
- Primary inflows: Antietam Creek
- Primary outflows: Antietam Creek
- Basin countries: United States
- Surface elevation: 515 ft (157 m)

Antietam Lake is a reservoir located entirely within Antietam Lake Park in Berks County, Pennsylvania. The reservoir was formerly owned by the city of Reading. It was purchased by Berks County in 2006. The lake is surrounded by 643 acres of park land.

== History ==
A beautiful waterfall formed by the dam can be seen on your way into Antietam Lake Park. A historical spring house is also located in the park. It is believed to be over 150 years old and is still intact. It is one of the main historical attractions in the park. In addition, a historical home on the property, known as Bingaman House, has been restored and is an environmental educational center.

== Geography ==
The reservoir is formed by the disbandment of Antietam Creek. It is stocked with trout annually.
