= Alsace Manor, Pennsylvania =

Unincorporated community in Pennsylvania, US

- Census-designated place
- Location within Pennsylvania Location within the United States
- Coordinates: 40°23′59″N 75°51′38″W
- Country: United States
- State: Pennsylvania
- County: Berks
- Township: Alsace

Area
  - Total: 0.34 sq mi (0.88 km^{2})
  - Land: 0.34 sq mi (0.88 km^{2})
  - Water: 0 sq mi (0.00 km^{2})

Population (2020)
  - Total: 480
  - Density: 1,413/sq mi (545.6/km^{2})
- Time zone: UTC-5 (Eastern (EST))
  - Summer (DST): UTC-4 (EDT)
- FIPS code: 42-02128

Alsace Manor is a census-designated place (CDP) in Alsace Township, Pennsylvania, United States. It is located approximately seven miles northeast of the city of Reading. As of the 2020 census, the population was 480.

Historical population
Census	Pop.	Note	%±
2020	480		—
U.S. Decennial Census
