= Antietam Hall =

Historic house in Maryland, US

- U.S. National Register of Historic Places
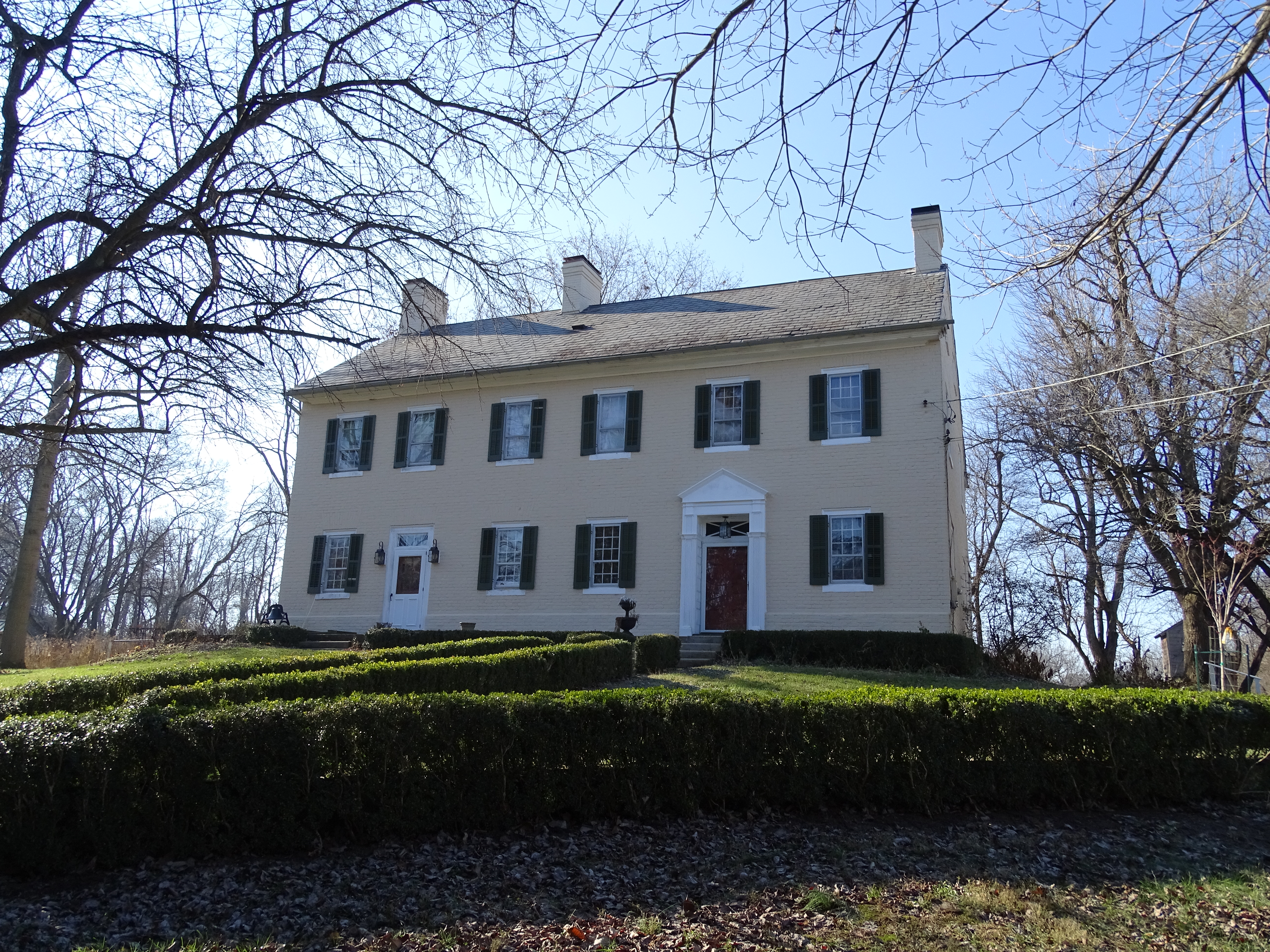

- Location within Maryland Location within the United States
- Location: 11806 Indian Lane; Hagerstown, Maryland
- Coordinates: 39°38′12″N 77°40′55″W
- Area: 7 acres (2.8 ha)
- NRHP reference No.: 79003269
- Added to NRHP: September 24, 1979

Antietam Hall is a historic home located in Hagerstown, Washington County, Maryland, United States. It is a two-story, partially Flemish bond brick dwelling, set on a low limestone foundation. The house has a slate roof and four chimneys. The property includes a large barn and other outbuildings, including a 1 1/2-story four-bay brick secondary dwelling.

Antietam Hall was listed on the National Register of Historic Places in 1979.
