= Antietam, Maryland =

Unincorporated community in Maryland, United States

- Unincorporated community
- Location within Maryland Location within the United States
- Coordinates: 39°24′58″N 77°44′32″W
- Country: United States
- State: Maryland
- County: Washington

Area
  - Total: 0.15 sq mi (0.40 km^{2})
  - Land: 0.15 sq mi (0.40 km^{2})
  - Water: 0 sq mi (0.00 km^{2})
- Elevation: 308 ft (94 m)

Population (2020)
  - Total: 98
  - Density: 638.7/sq mi (246.59/km^{2})
- Time zone: UTC−5 (Eastern (EST))
  - Summer (DST): UTC−4 (EDT)
- ZIP code: 21782
- Area codes: 301, 240
- FIPS code: 24-01750
- GNIS feature ID: 2583571

Antietam is an unincorporated community and census-designated place in Washington County, Maryland, United States. Its population was 98 as of the 2020 census. It is the site of Antietam Iron Furnace Site and Antietam Village, added to the National Register of Historic Places in 1975.

== Geography ==
According to the U.S. Census Bureau, the community has an area of 0.153 square miles (0.40 km^{2}), all land.

== Demographics ==
Historical population
Census	Pop.	Note	%±
2010	89		—
2020	98		10.1%
U.S. Decennial Census
