= Antietam Iron Furnace Site and Antietam Village =

Historic district in Maryland, United States

- U.S. National Register of Historic Places
- U.S. Historic district
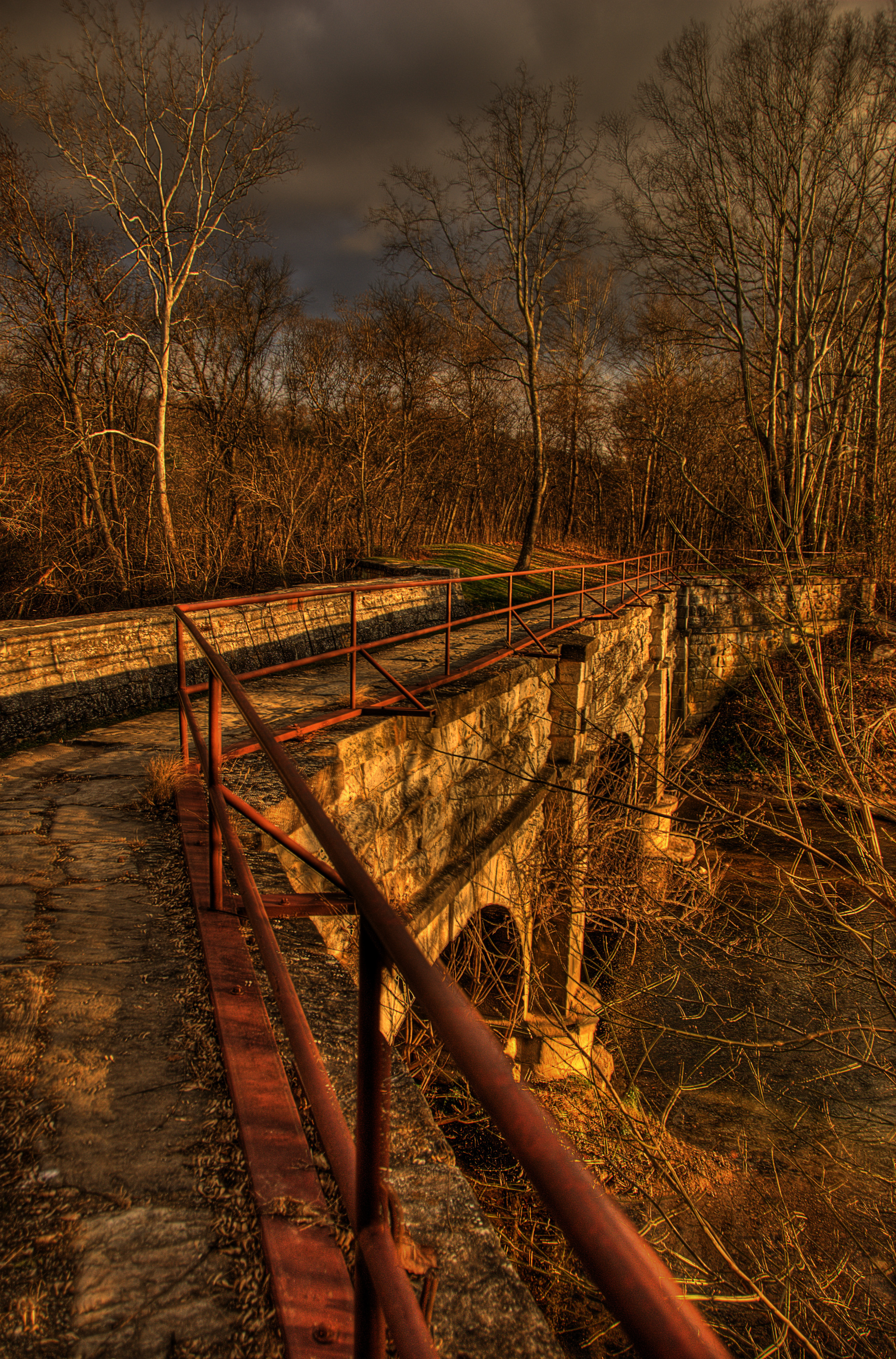
- Antietam Aqueduct

- Location within Maryland Location within the United States
- Nearest city: Antietam, Maryland
- Coordinates: 39°25′1″N 77°44′33″W
- Area: 50 acres (20 ha)
- Built: 1765
- NRHP reference No.: 75000149
- Added to NRHP: June 26, 1975

Antietam Iron Furnace Site and Antietam Village is a national historic district at Antietam, Washington County, Maryland, United States. It consists of the remains of a mid-18th to late-19th century iron furnace site, and the nearby related village. Remnants of the ironworks include a dam and race, a possible wheel pit or building foundation, the possible location of a furnace stack, and a four-arch stone bridge built by John Weaver in 1832. Also at the site are the dozen or so brick, stone, and wood houses comprising Antietam Village. Typical of the houses is the Mentzer house, a four-bay, two-storey stone structure of roughly coursed fieldstone, painted white.

The district was added to the National Register of Historic Places in 1975.
