= Union Township, Berks County, Pennsylvania =

Township in Pennsylvania, US

Union Township
- Township
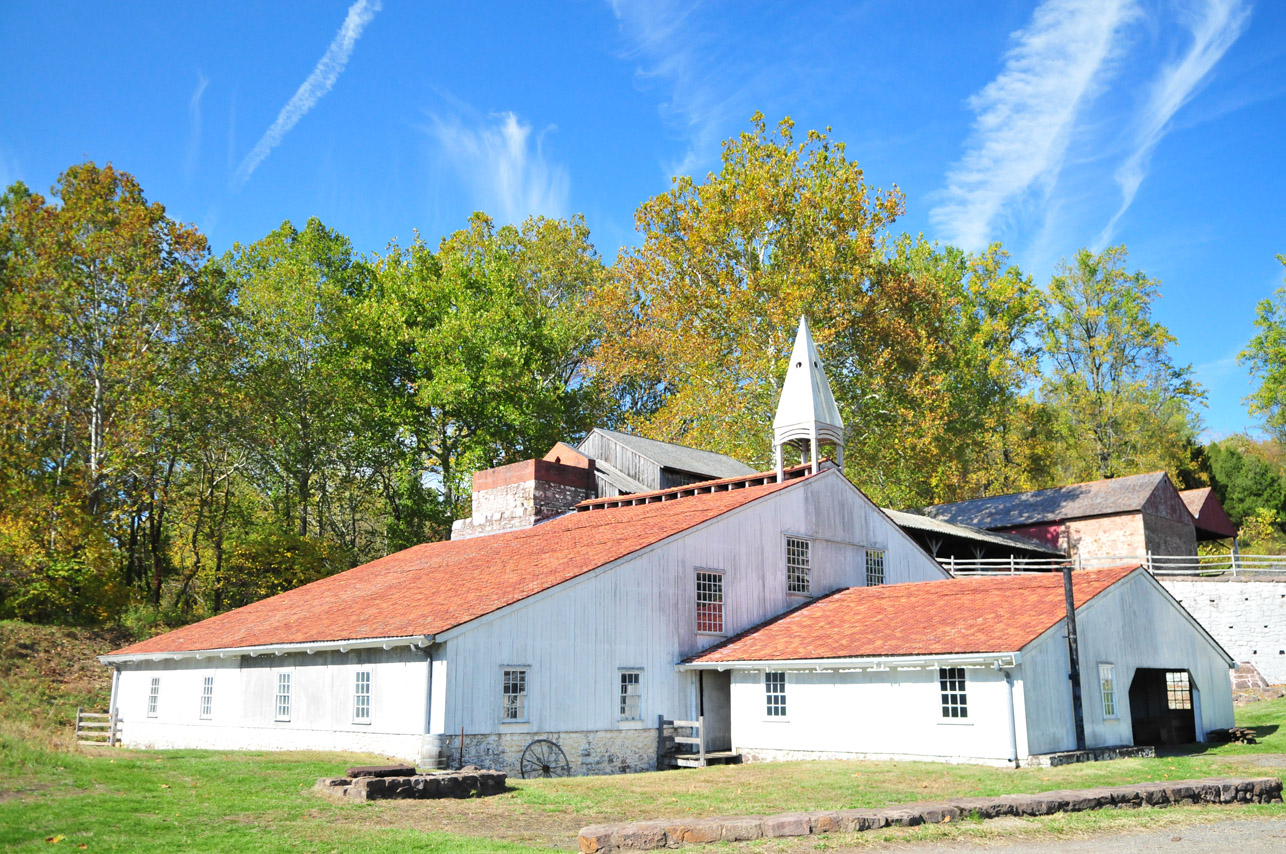
- Hopewell Furnace National Historic Site

- Location of Union Township in Pennsylvania Union Township (the United States)
- Coordinates: 40°15′06″N 75°44′35″W
- Country: United States
- State: Pennsylvania
- County: Berks

Area
  - Total: 23.5 sq mi (61 km^{2})
  - Land: 23.2 sq mi (60 km^{2})
  - Water: 0.3 sq mi (0.78 km^{2})
- Elevation: 200 ft (61 m)

Population (2010)
  - Total: 3,503
  - Estimate (2016): 3,593
  - Density: 151/sq mi (58.3/km^{2})
- Time zone: UTC-5 (EST)
  - Summer (DST): UTC-4 (EDT)
- Area code: 610
- FIPS code: 42-011-78280
- Website: https://www.unionberks.org/

Union Township is a township in Berks County, Pennsylvania, United States. The population was 3,503 at the 2010 census.

== History ==
The French Creek State Park: Six Penny Day Use District, French Creek State Park: Organized Group Camp 4 District, and Hopewell Furnace National Historic Site are listed on the National Register of Historic Places.

== Geography ==
According to the U.S. Census Bureau, the township has a total area of 23.5 square miles (60.8 km^{2}), of which 23.2 square miles (60.1 km^{2}) is land and 0.3 square mile (0.8 km^{2}) (1.28%) is water. The township is located in the Hopewell Big Woods.

== Demographics ==
At the 2000 census, there were 3,453 people, 1,324 households, and 1,035 families living in the township. The population density was 148.9 inhabitants per square mile (57.5/km^{2}). There were 1,370 housing units at an average density of 59.1 per square mile (22.8/km^{2}). The racial makeup of the township was 98.03% White, 0.58% African American, 0.14% Native American, 0.12% Asian, 0.03% Pacific Islander, 0.29% from other races, and 0.81% from two or more races. Hispanic or Latino of any race were 0.96%.

There were 1,324 households, 30.0% had children under the age of 18 living with them, 69.0% were married couples living together, 6.1% had a female householder with no husband present, and 21.8% were non-families. 17.5% of households were made up of individuals, and 7.3% were one person aged 65 or older. The average household size was 2.59 and the average family size was 2.93.

The age distribution was 21.6% under the age of 18, 6.0% from 18 to 24, 28.0% from 25 to 44, 29.7% from 45 to 64, and 14.7% 65 or older. The median age was 42 years. For every 100 females there were 100.3 males. For every 100 females age 18 and over, there were 97.6 males.

Historical population
Census	Pop.	Note	%±
1980	2,615		—
1990	3,440		31.5%
2000	3,453		0.4%
2010	3,503		1.4%
2016 (est.)	3,593		2.6%
U.S. Decennial Census

The median household income was $54,205 and the median family income was $61,048. Males had a median income of $42,685 versus $27,901 for females. The per capita income for the township was $26,014. About 1.8% of families and 2.8% of the population were below the poverty line, including 2.9% of those under age 18 and 4.7% of those age 65 or over.

== Recreation ==
Most of French Creek State Park and a small portion of the Pennsylvania State Game Lands Number 43 are located in Union Township.

== Transportation ==
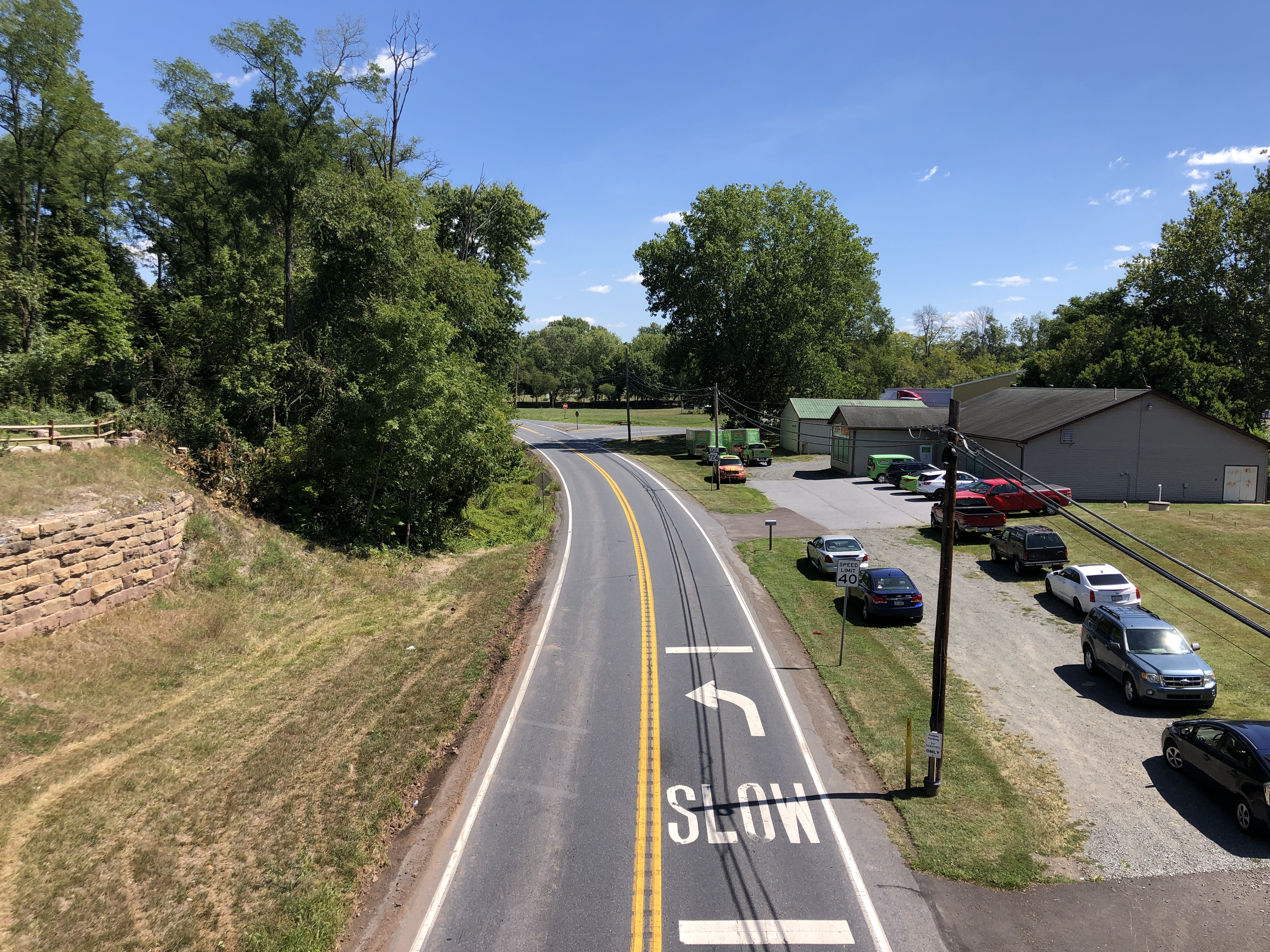
PA Route 724 East in Union Township

As of 2019, there were 44.93 miles (72.31 km) of public roads in Union Township, of which 11.68 miles (18.80 km) were maintained by the Pennsylvania Department of Transportation (PennDOT) and 33.25 miles (53.51 km) were maintained by the township.

Pennsylvania Route 345 and Pennsylvania Route 724 are the numbered highways serving Union Township. PA 345 follows Shed Road along a northwest–southeast alignment through the middle of the township. PA 724 follows Main Street along an east–west alignment across the northern portion of the township.
