= USS Antietam =

Three ships of the United States Navy have been named USS Antietam, after the Battle of Antietam.

- USS Antietam (1864), was a sailing sloop launched in 1864 and used as a stores ship.
- USS Antietam (CV-36), was an aircraft carrier commissioned at the end of World War II, a combatant in the Korean War, and decommissioned in 1963.
- USS Antietam (CG-54), is a guided missile cruiser commissioned in 1987, and decommissioned in 2024.

== See also ==
- USCGC Antietam, later renamed USCGC Bedloe, was a cutter which was commissioned from 1927 to 1944 before capsizing.
