= Antietam Creek (Schuylkill River tributary) =

Stream in Pennsylvania, USA

Antietam Creek Tributary to Schuylkill River
- Location of Antietam Creek mouth Antietam Creek (Schuylkill River tributary) (the United States)

Location
- Country: United States
- State: Pennsylvania
- County: Berks
- City: Reading

Physical characteristics
- Source: Little Manatawny Creek divide
  - location: pond about 0.25 miles south of Alsace Manor, Pennsylvania
  - coordinates: 40°23′27″N 075°51′15″W
  - elevation: 785 ft (239 m)
- Mouth
  - location: Southeastern Reading, Pennsylvania
  - coordinates: 40°16′58″N 075°50′51″W
  - elevation: 157 ft (48 m)
- Length: 10.01 mi (16.11 km)
- Basin size: 17.57 square miles (45.5 km^{2})
- Discharge
  - location: Schuylkill River
  - average: 27.54 cu ft/s (0.780 m^{3}/s) at mouth with Schuylkill River

Basin features
- Progression: Schuylkill River → Delaware River → Delaware Bay → Atlantic Ocean
- River system: Delaware River
- Tributaries
  - left: unnamed tributaries
  - right: unnamed tributaries
- Waterbodies: Antietam Reservoir
- Bridges: Mexico Road, Antietam Road, Seider Road, Angora Road, Antietam Road (x2), Heidelberg Avenue, Butler Lane, St. Lawrence Avenue, Oley Turnpike Road, Parkview Road, Gibralter Road, US 422

Antietam Creek is a 10.5-mile-long (16.9 km) tributary of the Schuylkill River in Berks County, Pennsylvania. It rises just south of Alsace Manor in Alsace Township. There are several non-named tributaries to the creek. It empties into the Schuylkill just south of Reading.

== See also ==
- List of Pennsylvania rivers
