= French Creek State Park =

State park in Pennsylvania, United States

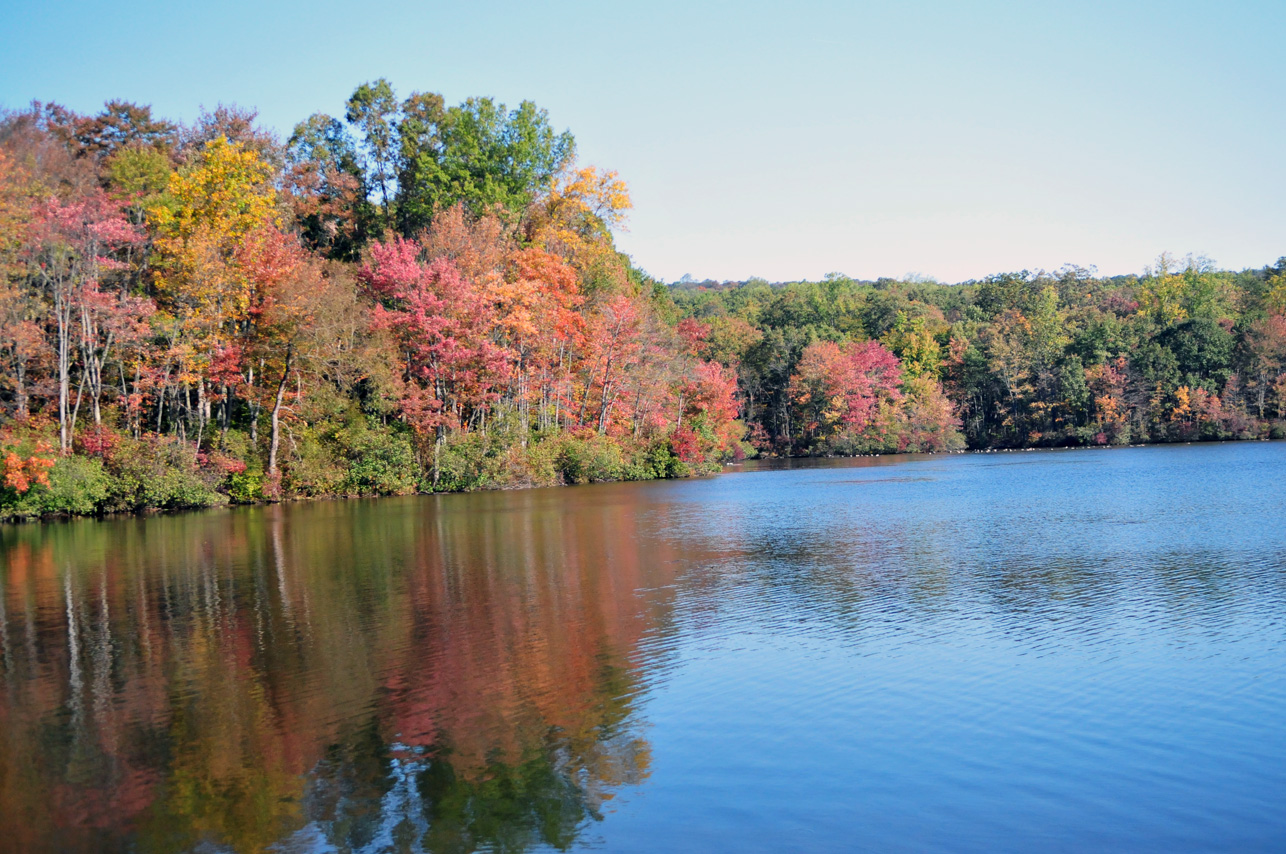
- Hopewell Lake in autumn

- Location within Pennsylvania Location within the United States
- Interactive map of French Creek State Park
- Location: Chester and Berks counties, Pennsylvania, United States
- Coordinates: 40°11′54″N 75°47′34″W
- Area: 7,730 acres (3,130 ha)
- Elevation: 781 feet (238 m)
- Established: 1946
- Administrator: Pennsylvania Department of Conservation and Natural Resources
- Website: Official website
- Pennsylvania State Parks

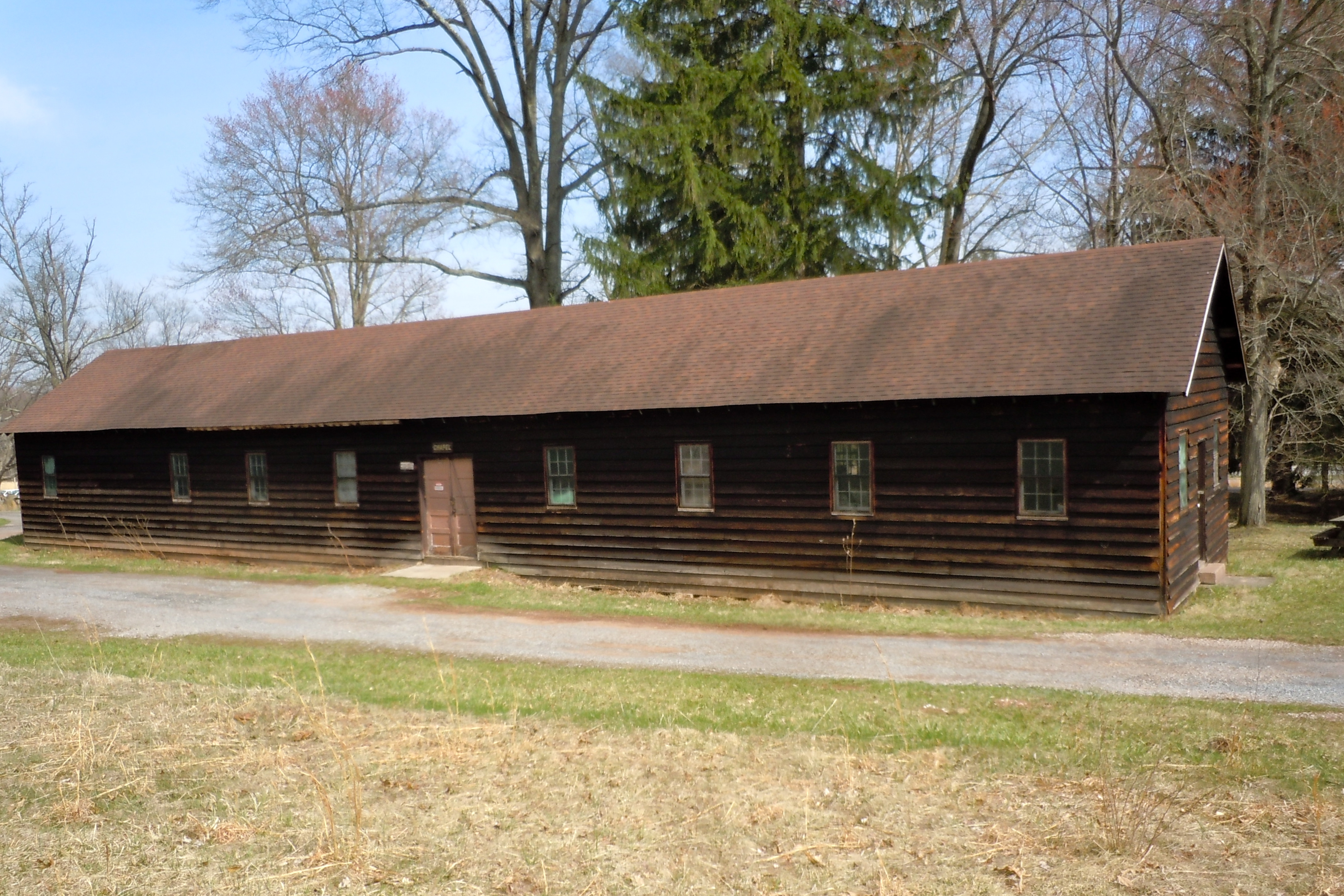
CCC barracks near the park office

French Creek State Park is a 7,730-acre (3,130 ha) Pennsylvania state park in North Coventry and Warwick Townships in Chester County and Robeson and Union Townships in Berks County, Pennsylvania. It straddles northern Chester County and southern Berks County along French Creek. It is located in the Hopewell Big Woods. The park is the home of two lakes: Hopewell Lake, a 68-acre (28 ha) warm water lake, and Scotts Run Lake, a 22-acre (8.9 ha) cold water lake. The state record smallmouth bass was caught in Scotts Run Lake. There are extensive forests, and almost 40 miles (64 km) of hiking and equestrian trails. The park is also friendly to mountain bikers, having some renowned technical trails. Hopewell Furnace National Historic Site, which features a cold blast furnace restored to its 1830s appearance, is surrounded by the park. The Six Penny Day Use Area and Group Camp are listed on the National Register of Historic Places. French Creek State Park is located off of Pennsylvania Route 345 to the south of Birdsboro.

French Creek State Park was chosen by the Pennsylvania Department of Conservation and Natural Resources (DCNR) and its Bureau of State Parks as one of "25 Must-See Pennsylvania State Parks".

== History ==
The land in and surrounding French Creek State Park was once dominated by old-growth forests of American chestnut. These trees were cleared, beginning in 1771, and used to make charcoal to feed the iron furnace at nearby Hopewell Furnace. The forests were allowed to regrow and were cleared again approximately every twenty-five years. The furnace was in operation for 112 years until 1883. The damage caused by the colliers had a long-lasting effect on the ecology of this section of southeastern Pennsylvania. The thickly wooded hillsides that once provided a habitat for a wide variety of woodland creatures were stripped bare. But the forest slowly began to grow back.

The second growth forests that stand today at French Creek State Park are made up of a mixture of oak, maple and other mostly hardwood trees. The land was reclaimed by the efforts of the young men of the Civilian Conservation Corps created during the Great Depression by President Franklin D. Roosevelt to offset unemployment. The CCC, invited to Pennsylvania by Governor Gifford Pinchot, worked to clear the forests and streams of brush. They also built many of the facilities still in use today at the park, including several tent camping areas, two small dams and lakes, two group camps, picnic areas, and extensive roads and trails throughout the park. They also began the restoration of the historic Hopewell Furnace.

== Recreation ==
=== Hunting and fishing ===
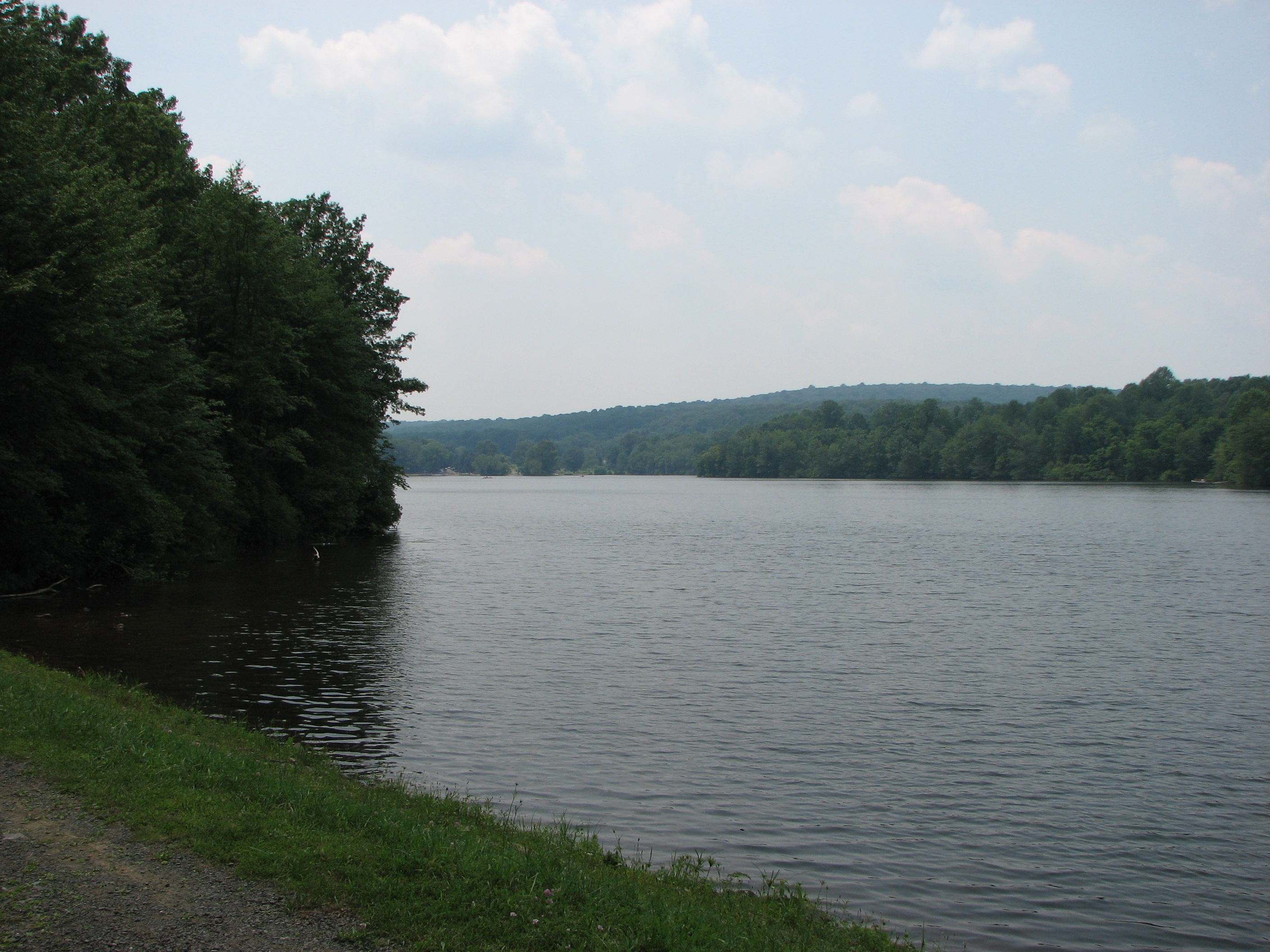
Hopewell Lake

Hunting is permitted on over 6,000 acres (2,400 ha) of French Creek State Park. Hunters are expected to follow the rules and regulations of the Pennsylvania Game Commission. The common game species are pheasants, squirrels, turkeys, white-tailed deer, and rabbits. The hunting of groundhogs is not permitted at the park.

The lakes at French Creek State Park offer two varieties of fishing. Scotts Run Lake is a cold water fishery. It is stocked with trout by the Pennsylvania Fish and Boat Commission. Hopewell Lake is a warm water fishery. The common game fish caught in the lake are muskellunge, walleye, northern pike, chain pickerel and largemouth, pan fish, and smallmouth bass. Both lakes are open to ice fishing, weather permitting. Bait & tackle are available for sale near the rest rooms by the boat launch at Hopewell Lake.

=== Boating and swimming ===
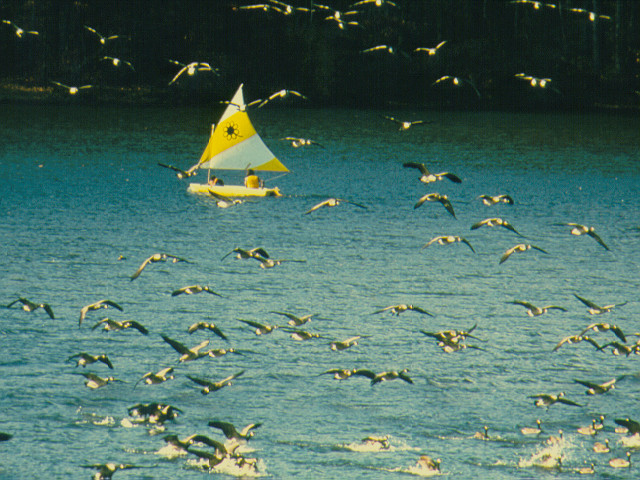
Sailing on Hopewell Lake

Gas powered boats are prohibited in the lakes of French Creek State Park. All non powered and electric powered boats must have a current registration with any state or a launch permit for the Pennsylvania Fish and Boat Commission.

The lakes are not open to swimming. A pool at nearby Hopewell Lake is open daily from 11:00am until 7:00pm from Memorial Day weekend through Labor Day weekend.

=== Disc golf and orienteering ===
One disc golf course is open year-round at the park. The course winds through the woods near Hopewell Lake and provides both short and long pin locations. Score cards and maps of the course are available at the park.

There is a permanent Orienteering course that begins and ends near the boat launch area. Maps are available at the park office. Orienteering events are held at the park by the Delaware Valley Orienteering Association about 3 times a year. More data on local Orienteering events can be found at http://www.dvoa.org

=== Trails ===
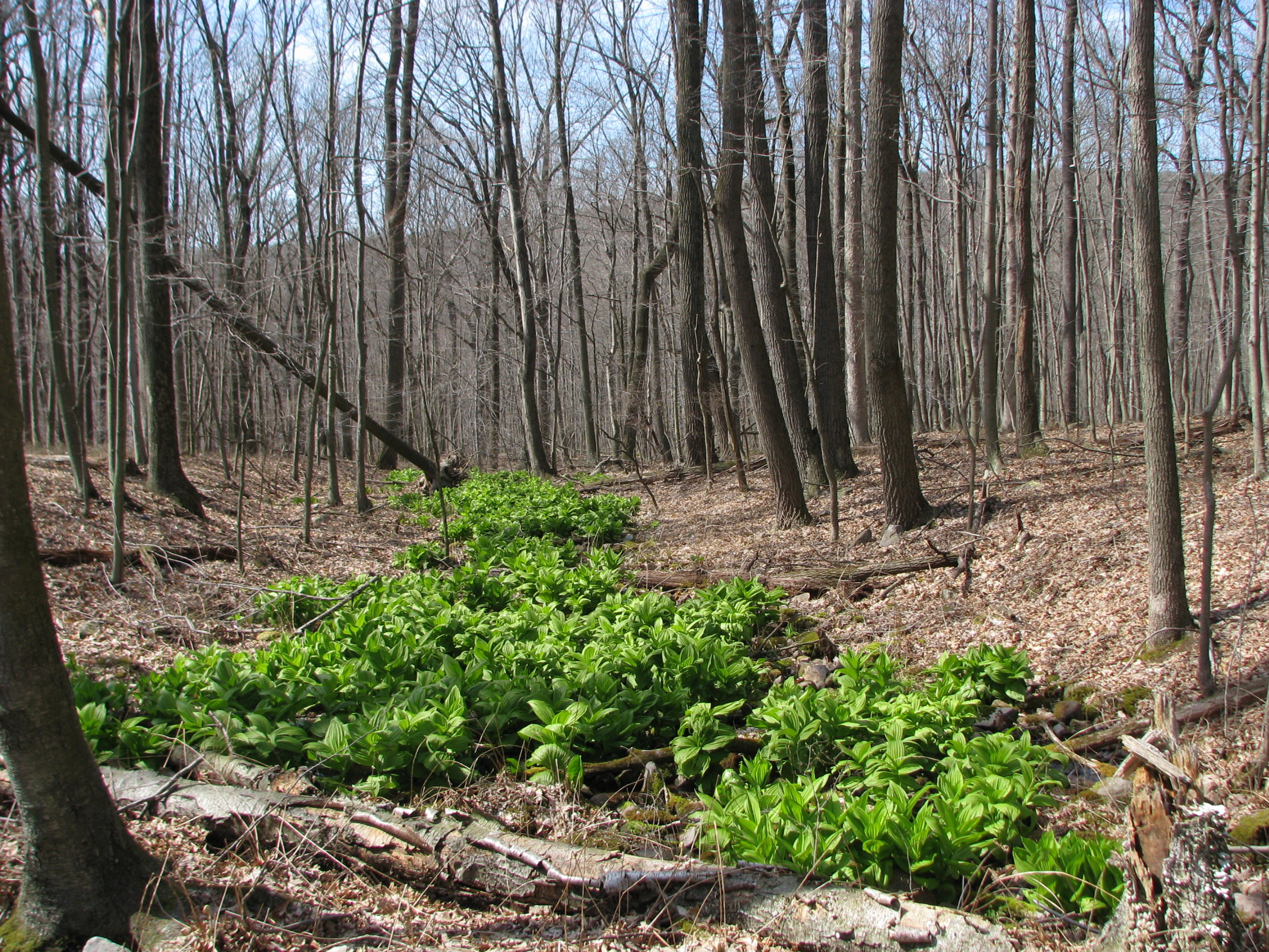
False hellebore

French Creek State Park has more than 30 miles (48 km) of trails that are open to hiking and in some places horseback riding, mountain biking, and cross-country skiing.

- Boone Trail is a 6-mile (9.7 km) "moderate" hiking trail that is marked with blue blazes. This trail makes a loop through the park. It is closed to mountain biking in the vicinity of Hopewell Lake.
- Buzzards Trail is a 3-mile (4.8 km) "moderate" hiking trail. This trail follows the banks of Baptism Creek.
- Horse-Shoe Trail is a 130-mile (210 km) hiking and horseback trail that passes through French Creek State Park. 8 miles (13 km) of the trail are in the park. Horse-Shoe Trail begins at Valley Forge National Historic Park and ends at the Appalachian Trail near Harrisburg.
- Kalmia Trail is a 1-mile (1.6 km) "moderate" hiking trail. The trail passes through a mature forest that is scattered with mountain laurel (Kalmia latifolia).
- Lenape Trail, named for the Lenape tribe that once inhabited the area, is a 5.5-mile (8.9 km) "moderate" hiking trail. It is also a loop trail.
- Mill Creek Trail is a 6-mile (9.7 km) "difficult" trail. The trailhead is at Pennsylvania Route 345 and Shed Road. It is a backcountry trail and does not cross any other paved roads.
- Raccoon Trail is a 1.7-mile (2.7 km) "moderate" trail. It connects Hopewell Furnace National Historic Site with French Creek State Park.

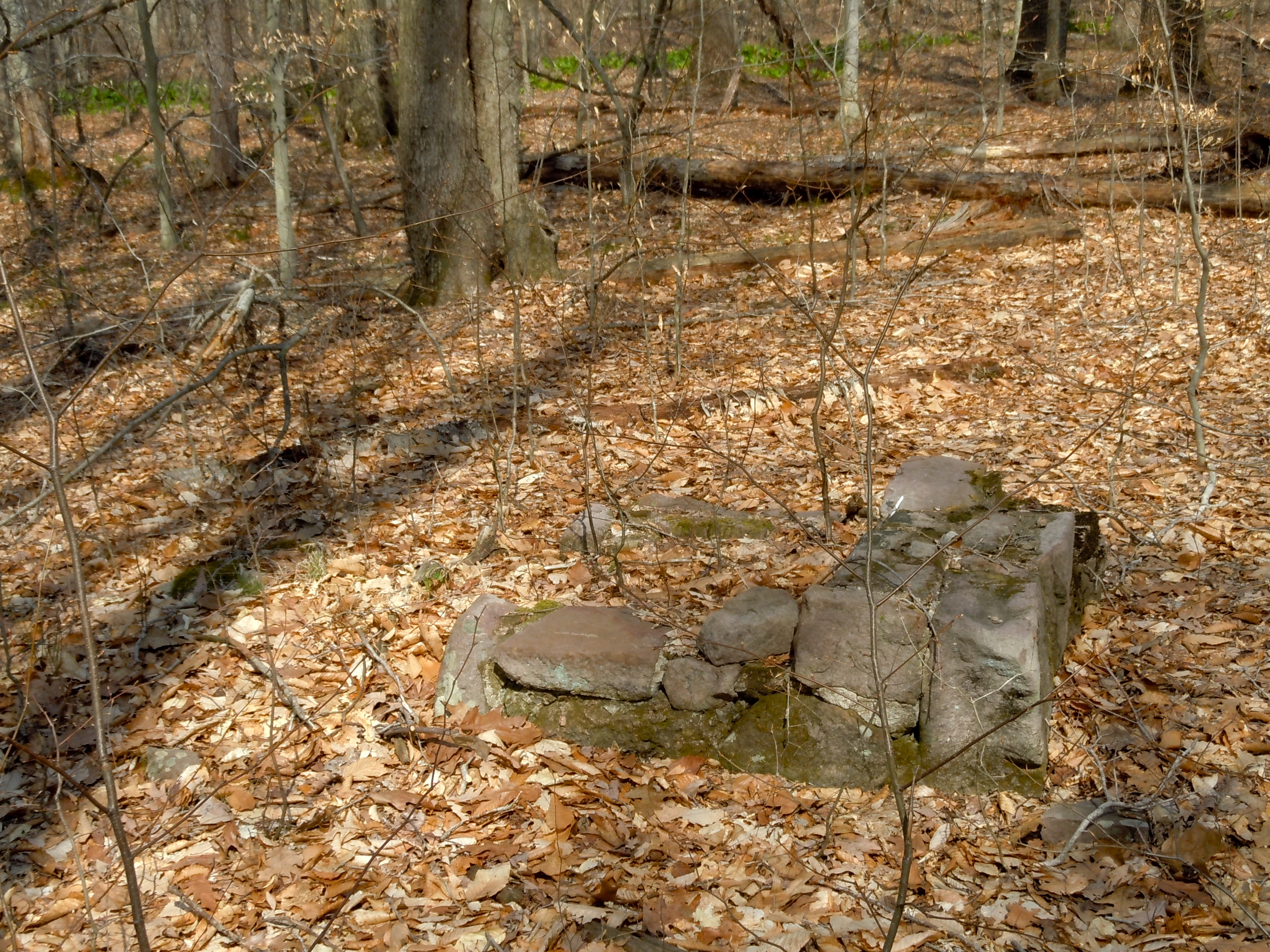
Remains of buildings near the Six Penny Trail

- Six Penny Trail is a 3-mile (4.8 km) "moderate" hiking trail. It is a loop trail, set off in the woods and is connected to the campground contact station by a short connector trail.
- Turtle Trail is a 3.6-mile (5.8 km) trail that follows the western portions of French Creek.

== Staying overnight ==
Visitors to the park have three options for overnight accommodations. There are 201 wooded and modern sites for tents or campers. This campground has a centrally located shower and toilet facility. Ten modern cabins are available to rent. Each cabin can sleep up to six with electric heat, a kitchen and private bathroom. Group camping, in cabins built by the Civilian Conservation Corps, is available to two separate locations. The facilities include dining halls, central washhouses, and cabins for campers and staff.

== Forest fires ==
On April 9, 2012, a forest fire started on the eastern side of Hopewell Furnace National Historic Site due to fallen tree onto a powerline during an unusually warm and dry spring. The fire followed an unusual October ice and snowstorm that caused tree limb damage. This caused the forest to become a "tinderbox," according to officials. The fire burned approximately 750 acres, largely contained within the park. The forest fire caused the park's trails east of Rt. 345 and south of Shed Road to be closed. It also caused numerous evacuations around the eastern and southern edges of the park, though the fire never damaged any homes. This was the longest, largest, and most expensive fire operation in the Pennsylvania Bureau of Forestry's history. The fire was officially declared extinguished on April 23, 2012, two weeks after the fire began.

A forest fire was spotted in the park on April 1, 2016, almost four years after the previous fire and in the same approximate location. The fire was reported to have burned at least nine acres south of Miller's Point.
