= Gina S. Brown =

American nurse and academic administrator (born 1963)

12th President of Oakwood University
- Incumbent
- Assumed office July 1, 2025
- Preceded by: Leslie Pollard

Personal details
- Born: Gina Trevette Spivey; April 4, 1963 (age 63) Norfolk, Virginia, U.S.
- Children: 2
- Education: Oakwood College; Central Michigan University; George Mason University

Gina Spivey-Brown (born April 4, 1963) is an American nurse and academic administrator. In 2025, she became the 12th president of Oakwood University, the first woman to hold the position in the institution's 129-year history.

== Early life and education ==
Gina Trevette Spivey was born in Norfolk, Virginia, on April 4, 1963 as one of five children. She attended Oakwood College, where she earned an Associate of Science in Nursing in 1984 and a B.S. in nursing and biology in 1985. She received a M.S. in administration with a focus on health services administration from Central Michigan University in 1989. Spivey-Brown completed her Ph.D. in nursing administration, with a specialization in policy and ethics, at George Mason University in 1999. Her dissertation was titled "Toward An Understanding Of Stress And Coping Mechanisms Experienced Among African American Males." Margaret Dear was her doctoral advisor.

== Career ==
Spivey-Brown began her career as a critical care nurse and held several positions in hospital administration, including nurse recruiter, nursing supervisor, IRB research liaison and nurse consultant. She later moved into academia, serving as chair of the Nursing Department at Columbia Union College now named Washington Adventist University. In that position, she moved from chair, and held 2 deanships. Dean of the School of Graduate and Professional Studies, and Dean of the College of Health Professions, Nursing and Wellness. She served there for 12 years, working with nursing programs in Ghana, Tanzania and the Philippines, writing curriculum and assisting in opening up schools of nursing in those countries.

She left Washington Adventist University in 2011 and held a professorship at the School of Nursing at Loma Linda University for nearly four years, working with the first DNP program and assisted 39 students in completing their terminal degree within four years.

For ten years, Spivey-Brown was the Dean of the College of Nursing and Allied Health Sciences at Howard University. At Howard University, she expanded graduate and undergraduate programs, secured multimillion-dollar grants, and strengthened accreditation standards.

Spivey-Brown holds several professional designations, including registered nurse (RN), and is a fellow of the American Academy of Nursing (FAAN), the National Academies of Practice (FNAP), and the Academy of Diversity Leaders in Nursing (FADLN) of the National Black Nurses Association. In 2023, she received the Gold Award from the Arnold P. Gold Foundation. She served as a commissioner for the National League for Nursing (NLN) Commission for Nursing Education Accreditation, served as a site visitor member for both Middle States Accreditation and the Adventist Association of Academia (AAA) regional accrediting agency. She is also a consultant on program accreditation and healthcare disparities.

In March 2025, Spivey-Brown was appointed the 12th president of Oakwood University, a historically Black university in Huntsville, Alabama. She succeeded Leslie Pollard, who had led the university for 15 years. The appointment made her the first woman and the third non-clergy member to lead the institution in its 129-year history. She officially assumed the role on July 1, 2025, and her inauguration was held on September 26, 2025. In her first 86 days in office, Spivey-Brown led a fundraising campaign that raised over $500,000 in two weeks, which cleared 400 of the university's 1,200 students to register for classes. Her early tenure also focused on reviewing academic standards and addressing financial and cybersecurity issues by stabilizing the university's endowment and hiring IT experts.

== Personal life ==
She has a son and daughter. Both of her children are also graduates of Oakwood University.
