= DVFS =

DVFS may refer to:

- Delaware Valley Friends School, Pennsylvania, US
- Dynamic voltage and frequency scaling, a power management technique in computer architecture
