= Thomas Rutter =

Colonial American ironmaster and abolitionist (1660–1730)

- Born: 1660; England
- Died: March 12, 1730; Pennsylvania, British America
- Occupation: Ironmaster
- Known for: Founder of the first iron forge in the U.S. state of Pennsylvania

Thomas Rutter (1660 – March 12, 1730) was an American ironmaster and abolitionist who constructed the first blast furnace and the first iron forge in the Province of Pennsylvania. Now known as Pine Forge Mansion and Industrial Site, the location of Rutter's mansion and iron plantation was listed on the National Register of Historic Places in 2004. The site has been the campus of Pine Forge Academy since 1945.

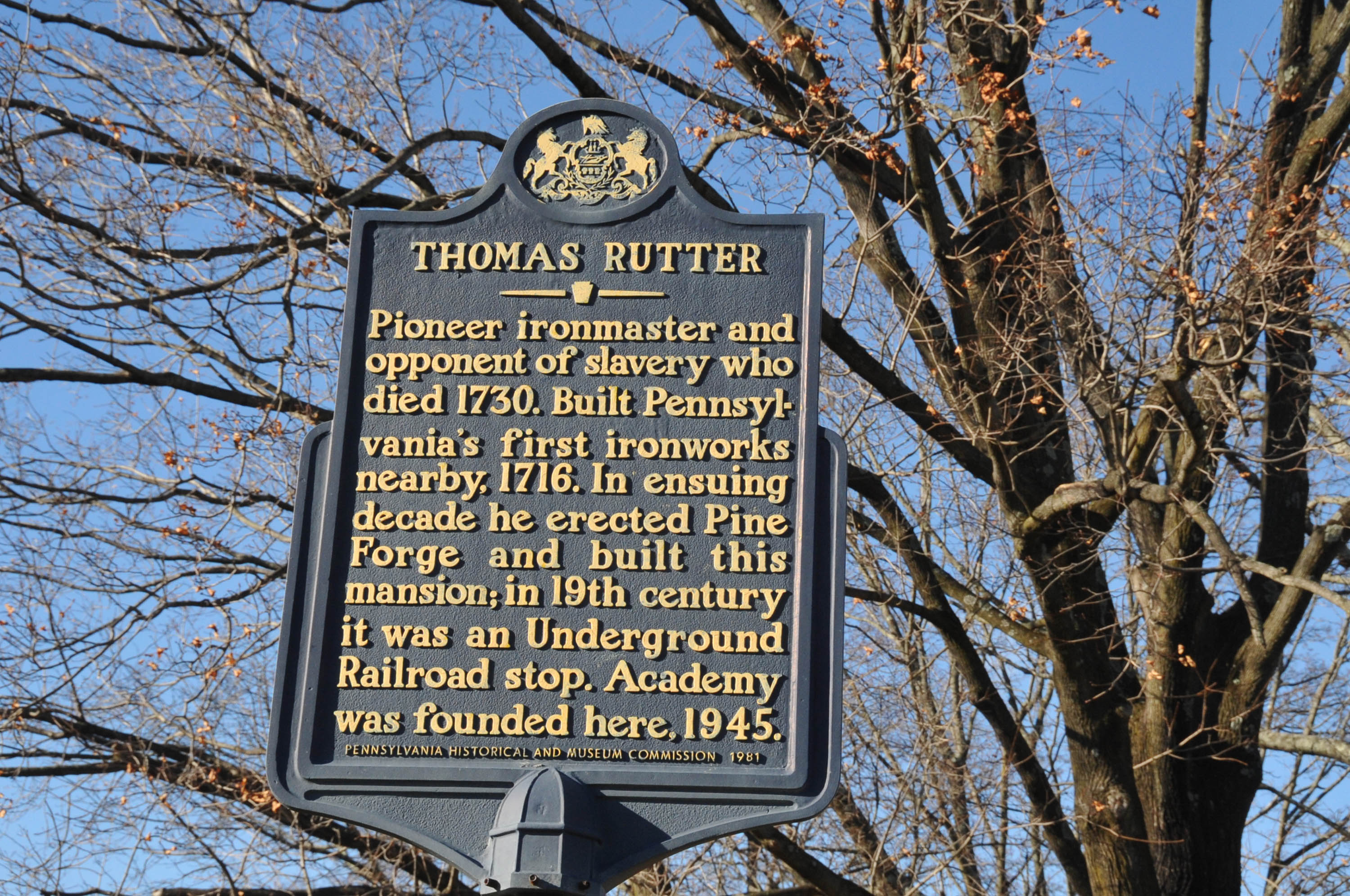
Pennsylvania state historical marker for Thomas Rutter

== Biography ==
Born in 1660, Rutter was a Quaker blacksmith who immigrated from England to southeastern Pennsylvania as a young man. He married Rebecca Staples at the Pennsbury Friends Meetinghouse on October 11, 1685, and acquired property near William Penn's Pennsbury Manor in Bristol Township. By January 1702, he had acquired over seven hundred acres with the goal of mining the soil for iron ore, though the venture failed.

In a covenant dated February 12, 1715, Governor William Penn granted Rutter three hundred acres on Manatawny Creek two or three miles above modern-day Pottstown. Rutter left his home in Germantown to establish Pine Forge, a bloomery that was the first iron forge in Pennsylvania, on his land by 1716. By 1720, Rutter had expanded his land holdings to fifteen hundred acres, ensuring an ample supply of surface iron ore, wood to produce charcoal, and water. A 1717 letter from minister Jonathan Dickinson praised the quality of Rutter's iron, remarking that "the best of Sweden's iron doth not exceed it." Partnering with his neighbor Thomas Potts (father of John Potts, founder of Pottstown), Rutter also became the principal owner of the nearby Colebrookdale Furnace, established in 1720. The forges stayed in the Rutter family for six generations and in the related Potts family for three generations. Numerous surviving stoveplates and firebacks feature biblical scenes and verses and are marked with the family name.

A follower of George Keith, Rutter was an abolitionist who signed An Exhortation & Caution to Friends Concerning Buying or Keeping of Negroes (1694), one of the earliest printed antislavery tracts in British America. The statement condemned slavery as "unjust and immoral" and warned that slaveholding was antithetical to Quaker values. His descendants hired Black workers and during the 1830s and 1840s concealed freedom seekers in old tunnels dug beneath the manor house to protect residents from Indian attacks. The 1725 house is considered a station on the Underground Railroad.

In 1982, the Pennsylvania Historical and Museum Commission dedicated a state historical marker commemorating Thomas Rutter outside Pine Forge Academy, a historically Black school that forms part of the Seventh-day Adventist education system. Rutter's mansion and iron plantation had been the campus of Pine Forge Academy since 1945. Rutter was a prominent citizen in the Province of Pennsylvania, serving as bailiff of Germantown (1705–06), serving in the Pennsylvania Provincial Assembly (1713–15, 1727–28), and preaching at the Abington Friends Meeting.

Rutter died on March 12, 1730, after a short illness. His death was reported in the Pennsylvania Gazette. He was survived by his wife and their sons Joseph, John, and Thomas II.
