= WOCG =

WOCG may refer to:

- WOCG (FM), a radio station (89.1 FM) licensed to serve Livingston, Tennessee, United States
- WJOU, a radio station (90.1 FM) licensed to Huntsville, Alabama, United States, which held the call sign WOCG until 2008
