= Sydney Freeman Jr. =

American academic

- Born: 1984 (age 41–42); Camden, New Jersey
- Education: Oakwood University, Auburn University
- Occupation: Academic
- Website: drsydneyfreemanjr.com

Sydney Freeman Jr. (born 1984) is an American educational theorist, social scientist, and former educational administrator. Freeman's early education was at Seventh-Day Adventist, historically black schools and institutions, and has written several articles about the history and state of the denomination. His areas of research includes higher education, the challenges in higher education administration programs, the university presidency, the faculty career cycle, and the leadership of historically black colleges and universities. He is a professor in the Department of Leadership and Counseling at the University of Idaho in Moscow, Idaho, the first African American male to be promoted to full professor in the university's history.

== Early life and education ==
Freeman grew up in Camden, New Jersey, the third generation in his family to reside there, to Christian singers and musicians Sydney and Cassandra Freeman. His grandmother was Mary Lewis, a community service advocate in the Adventist church. He attended Seventh-day Adventist Church schools from preschool to college, including Pine Forge Academy in Pennsylvania, an Adventist high school that is one of four historically black boarding college-preparatory academies, where he was a leader in singing and drama ministries, and Oakwood University in Huntsville, Alabama. While at Oakwood, Freeman founded the Progressive Black Caucus. Freeman's early influences were gospel singer Tye Tribbett and actress Tasha Smith; he said that they helped him "see excellence in other ways".

After shadowing the president of Oakwood, Delbert Baker, Freeman decided to go into field of higher education, with the goal of becoming a university president. He earned a master's degree in 2008 and a PhD in higher education administration in 2011 from Auburn University.

== Career and research ==
Freeman's areas of research include higher education, the challenges in higher education administration programs, the university presidency, the faculty career cycle, and the leadership of historically black colleges and universities.

In 2014, Freeman served as director of the Teaching and Learning Center at Tuskegee University. In 2016, he was named a certified online instructor by the Learning Resource Network. As of 2019, Freeman was a professor and instructor in the Department of Leadership and Counseling at the University of Idaho in Moscow, Idaho. Also in 2019, he served on the University of Idaho's presidential selection committee. In April 2019, Freeman was named to a three-year term on Auburn University's College of Educational National Alumni Council. He was the youngest member of the council. As an African American instructor at the University of Idaho, where 13 percent of its faculty are people of color, Freeman recognized that he was "often the first black professor that many of his students have had". Freeman has published numerous journal articles and was the lead editor of Advancing Higher Education as a Field of Study: In Quest of Doctoral Degree Guidelines (2014), which received the Auburn University Graduate School "Book of the Year" award in 2015. He founded and served as editor-in-chief of The Journal for the Study of Postsecondary and Tertiary Education. He served on several academic journal editorial and review boards.

In 2021, at the age of 36, Freeman became the first African American male to be promoted to full professorship in the history of the University of Idaho. Freeman was named the director of the University of Idaho's Black History Research Lab, which was founded in the fall of 2021. In late 2021, he was the first Black person to earn the Barbara Townsend Award from the Association for the Study of Higher Education, for his work focusing on higher education leadership preparation; he also gave, as part of earning the award, a keynote lecture at the association's annual conference. In 2022, he was named a visiting scholar at the University of Pennsylvania.

Freeman's theology and Christian beliefs were influenced by Maury Jackson, an Adventist theologian at La Sierra University. He stated that although "the cross unites all Adventist and Christian theology...it begins and ends at the cross". He also stated that one's culture and experience informs theology and beliefs. He called for more African American theologians trained at the doctoral level, as well as the development of a black Adventist theology. In 2019, he was researching the life and works of Owen Troy, the first Adventist of color to earn a doctorate in theology.

Freeman is married to Lynda Murphy Freeman, an assistant professor at the University of Idaho medical school program. In 2019, they were working together on a book chapter about their experiences retaining their cultural heritage as black professors in a majority white university and rural community.

== Awards ==
- American Association of University Administrators’ Robert MacVitte Emerging Leader of the Year (2015)
- Auburn University Graduate School 2015 Auburn Authors Award (2015)
- National Pine Forge Academy Alumni Association Meritorious Award (2018)
- Auburn University's College of Education Outstanding Young Alumni Award (2020)
- Idaho Business Review's Accomplished Under 40 Honoree Award (2020)

== Selected publications ==
=== Journal articles ===
- Freeman, Jr., S.; Kochan, F. (2012). "The Academic Pathways to University Leadership: Presidents Descriptions of their Doctoral Education". International Journal of Doctoral Studies. 7: 93—124.
- _____ (2012). "The Future of Higher Education Preparation: Implications for Policy and Practice". Journal of Education Policy. 1: 1–8.(2012) "The Role of Assessment and Accountability in Higher Education Doctoral Programs: A Presidential Perspective. International Journal of Educational Leadership Preparation", 1: 1—13.
- Freeman, Jr., S. (2012) "The Future of Higher Education Preparation: Implications for Policy and Practice". Journal of Education Policy. 1: 1–8.
- Freeman, Jr. S.; Kochan, F. (2013). "University Presidents’ Perspectives of the Knowledge and Competencies Needed in 21st Century Higher Education Leadership. Journal of Educational Leadership in Action". 1: 1—20.
- Wolfe, B.; Freeman, Jr., S. (2013). "A Case Administrator of Color: Insights and Policy Implications for Higher Education’s Predominantly White Institutions". eJournal of Education Policy. 1: 1—11.
- Freeman, Jr., S. (2014). "Strategies for Doctoral Students Who Desire to Become Higher Education Faculty Members: Implications for Practice. International". Journal of Doctoral Studies 9: 271–291.
- Freeman, Jr., S.; Gasman, M. (2014). "The Characteristics of Historically Black College and University Presidents and Their Role in Grooming the Next Generation of Leaders". Teachers College Record. 116: 1—34.
- Barnett, N. C.; Freeman, Jr., S.; Freeman, M. L. (2016). "Higher Education Graduate Programs at Minority Serving Institutions". Western Journal of Black Studies. 40 (3): 3—19.
- Card, K., Chambers, C.; Freeman, Jr., S. (2016) "Is there a Core Curricula across Higher Education Doctoral Programs". International Journal of Doctoral Studies, 11: 127–146.
- Findlay, H. J.; Freeman, Jr., S.; Findlay, H. E. (2016) "Generational and Fatal Leadership in a Time of Unprecedented Challenges and Changes". Journal of Higher Education Management. 31 (1): 28–43.
- _____ (2016). "Introducing the Journal for the Study of Postsecondary Education". Journal for the Study of Postsecondary and Tertiary Education. 1: 1–8.
- Freeman, Jr.. S.; Diramio, D. (2016) "Elitism or Pragmatism? Faculty Hiring at Top Ranked in Higher Education Administration". Journal of the Professoriate. 8 (2): 94—127.
- Freeman, Jr., S.; Gasman, M.; Commodore, F.; Carter, C. (2016). "Leaders Wanted!: The Skills Expected and Needed for a Successful 21st Historically Black College and University Presidency". Journal of Black Studies. 6: 1—16.
- Hilton, A. A.; Freeman, Jr., S.; Lee, Jr., J. M. (2016) "The Governing Structures of State Supported Historically Black Colleges and Universities". Journal of HBCU Research + Culture, 1: 1—13.
- McGaskey, F.; Freeman, Jr. S.; Guyton, C.; Richmond, D.; Guyton, C. W. (2016). "The social support networks of black males in higher education administration doctoral programs: An exploratory study". Western Journal of Black Studies. 40 (2): 141–158.
- Chambers, C.R.; Freeman, S., Jr. (2017). "From Margin to Center: Rethinking the Canon in Higher Education Graduate Programs". Journal for the Study of Postsecondary and Tertiary Education. 2: 115–119.
- Forthun, G.; Freeman, Jr., S. (2017). "Community College Leadership Preparation Programs: A Review of the Literature". Community College Enterprise. 1: 14–26.
- Freeman, Jr., S.; Kitchell, A.; Carr-Chellman, A. (2017). "The Negentropic Professor and the Online Curriculum". ELearn Magazine.
- Tomlinson, G.; Freeman, Jr., S. (2017). "Who Really Selected You? Insights into Faculty Selection Processes at Top-Ranked Higher Education Graduate Programs". Journal of Farther and Higher Education, pp. 1–13.
- Forthun, G.; Freeman, S., Jr. (2017). "Executive higher education doctoral programs in the United States: A demographic market-based analysis". Issues in Informing Science and Information Technology Education, 14: 1—19.
- Freeman, Jr., S. (March 28, 2017) "Moving into the New Trump Era: A Black Scholar’s Response". Berkeley Review in Education.
- _____ (May 18, 2017). "Homework for White Leaders." Diverse Issues in Higher Education. 34 (8): 25.
- Douglas, T. M. O.; Lane-Bonds, D.; Freeman, Jr., S. (Summer 2017). "Voices from the Field: There is No Manual for University Presidents: An Interview with Andrea Luxton, President of Andrews University, on her leadership in response to the #ItIsTimeAU uprising on her campus". The Journal of Negro Education. 86 (3): 368–380.
- Freeman, Jr., S. (2018). "The Manuscript Dissertation: A Means of Increasing Competitive Edge for Tenure-Track Faculty Positions". International Journal of Doctoral Studies. 13 (1): 273–292.
- Freeman, Jr., S.; Bird, S. (2018). "Teaching Qualitative Research Online". Informing Faculty, 3 (1): 1—47.
- Freeman, Jr. S.; Louis, D. (2018). "A Critical Examination of the Role of Mentoring in the Development of Black Male Higher Education and Student Affairs Scholars". Journal of African American Males in Education. 9 (1): 19–39.
- Wheeler, E. M.; Freeman, Jr., S. (2018). "'Scholaring While Black': Discourses on Race, Gender, and the Tenure Track. Journal of the Professoriate". 9 (2): 57–86.
- Carr-Chellman, A.A.; Freeman, Jr.; S.; Kitchel, A. (2019). "Leadership for Negentropic online enterprise". Nueva Revista: de Politica, Cultura Y Arte. (Spain) 77 (274): 437–454.
- Freeman, S., Jr.; Krier, K.; Al-Asfour, A.; Thacker, R. (2019). "An Examination of the Barriers to Leadership for Faculty of Color at U.S. Universities". Issues in Informing Science and Information Technology. 16: 361–376.
- Thacker, R.; Freeman, Jr., S.; Campbell, D. (2019). "Setting a New Global Agenda: Learning from International Approaches to Higher Education Leadership Development". Journal for the Study of Postsecondary and Tertiary Education 4: 299–306.
- Douglas, T.; Freeman, Jr., S.; Denham, A. (February 26, 2019). "The Three Hebrew Boys Revisited: Exploring Border-Crossing Brotha-ship in the Journeys of Three Tenured Black Male Seventh-day Adventist Professors". Religions. 10 (142): 1—18.
- Freeman, Jr., S.; Kochan, F. (4 March 2019). "Exploring Mentoring across Gender, Race, and Generation in Higher Education: An Ethnographic Study. International Journal of Mentoring and Coaching in Education". 8 (1): 2—18.
- Freeman, Jr. S.; Forthun, G. (Spring 2019). "The Paucity of Asian-American Distinguished Professors and Endowed Chairs: Toward a More Racially Integrated System of Advancement in the Professoriate". eJournal of Education Policy. 1: 1-12.
- Carr-Chellman, A.; Kitchell, A.; Freeman, Jr., S. (2019). "Negentropy: Energy Creating tools for Organizational Development". Tech Trends.
- Jensen, D.; Freeman, Jr., S. (2019). "Stepping to Center Stage: The Rise of Higher Education as a Field of Study. Journal of Educational Foundations". 32 (1,2,3, & 4): 1-24.
- Palmer, R.; Freeman, Jr., S. (2019). "Examining Unsuccessful Leadership Practices for Presidents at HBCUs". Journal of Diversity in Higher Education, 1-10.
- Freeman, Jr., S.; Forthun, G. (2019). "The Paucity of Asian-American Distinguished Professors and Endowed Chairs: Toward a More Racially Integrated System of Advancement in the Professoriate". eJournal of Education Policy. 1: 1-12.
- Freeman, Jr.; Palmer, R. (2020). "Successful Leadership Practices for Presidents at HBCUs". Journal of Underrepresented and Minority Progress. 4 (2): 211-232.
- Thacker, R.; Freeman, Jr., S. (2020). "The Importance of Stress Management for University Presidents". The William & Mary Educational Review. 7 (1): 46-70.
- Freeman, Jr., S., Karkouti, I.; Ward, K. (2020). "Thriving as a Departmental Chair: What are the Keys?" Higher Education, 79 (4): 1-19.
- Freeman, Jr., S.; Karkouti, I.; Douglas, T. (2020). "Avoiding Fake Degrees and Diploma Mills". Journal Adventist Education. 82 (1): 4-11.
- Al-Asfour, A.; Freeman, Jr. S. (2020)."Effective Strategies and Characteristics That Lead Native American Students to Complete Graduate Education". Educational Research: Theory and Practice 32 (1): 1-16.
- Chambers, C.; Freeman, Jr., S. (2020). "To Be Young, Gifted, and Black: The Relationship between Age and Race in Earning Full Professorships". Review of Higher Education. 43 (3): 811–836.
- Al-Asfour, A., Keleher, J., & Freeman, Jr. S. (2021). "Preparation for the College and University Leadership before the Age of 40". The Journal of Research on the College President. 5 (1): 19–35.
- McNaughton, J., Thacker, R., Eicke, D. & Freeman, Jr. S. (2021). "Committed to Their Craft: Understanding the Relationship between Job Crafting and Work Commitment among Faculty". Higher Education Quarterly, pp. 1–24.
- _____ (2021). "Trust and Self-Determination: Understanding the Role of Faculty Empowerment and Job Satisfaction". Journal of Higher Education, pp. 1–24.
- Thacker, R. & Freeman, Jr. S. (2021). “ 'When I Show Up': Black Provosts at Predominantly White Institutions". Harvard Educational Review, 91 (2): 157–178.
- _____ (2021). "Toward a Theory of the Study of Higher Education". Philosophy and Theory in Higher Education. 3 (1): pp. 67–89.
- McAvoy, J., Freeman, Jr., S., Kitchell, A., & Carr-Chellman, A. (2021). "Perceptions Versus Reality: First Year/Early Career Faculty Expectations and Experiences through the Lens of Negentropy". International Journal of Leadership Education.

=== Edited books\periodicals ===
- Freeman, Jr., S.; Hagedorn, L.S.; Goodchild, L., eds. (2014). Advancing Higher Education as a Field of Study: In Quest of Doctoral Degree Guidelines. Sterling, Virginia: Stylus Publishing. ISBN 978-1-62036-111-5
- _____ (2014). "Special Issue: Diverse Organizational Issues in Higher Education". Journal of Education Policy, Planning and Administration.
- _____ (2014). "Special Issue: Emerging organizational Ussues in Higher Education". Journal of Higher Education Management. 29 (1).
- Freeman, Jr., S.; Chambers, C.; King, B. R. (2016). The Role of Institutional Research in Academic Program Development. Hoboken, New Jersey: John Wiley & Sons Publishing. ISBN 978-1-119-29971-4.
- Felder, P.; Freeman, Jr., S. (Summer 2017). Special Issue: Black Students in Doctoral Education". 40 (2). Western Journal of Black Studies.
- Freeman, Jr.. S. (November 19, 2017). "Special Issue: Shared Governance in Higher Education". Workplace: A Journal for Academic Labor. DOI: https://doi.org/10.14288/workplace.v0i29.
- Freeman, Jr., S.; Lee, J. M. (2018). "Successful Financial Models at HBCUs". In Davis, S.: & W. Kimbrough, W. (Eds.). Models of success: How Historically Black Colleges and Universities Survive the Recession, pp. 59-76. Information Age Publishing.
- Freeman, Jr., S. (2018). "Forward". In Hartlep, N. D. (Ed.) Asian/American Scholars of Education: 21st Century Pedagogies, Perspectives, and Experiences, pp. xv-xxi. Peter Lang Publishing.
- Freeman, Jr., S.; Kochan, F. (2020). "Mentoring across Race, Gender, and Generation in Higher Education: A Cross Cultural Analysis". In Irby, B. J.; Boswell, J; Searby, L.; Kochan, F.; Garza, R. (Eds.) International Handbook of Mentoring: Paradigms, Practices, Programs, and Possibilities, pp. 471-186. Wiley-Blackwell Publishing.
- Freeman, Jr., S.; Shaw, M. (2020). "Preparing for the Storm in Times of Peace: Strategies for Preparing Higher Education Presidents for Campus Racial Crises". In Douglas, T.M.O.; Shockley, K.; Toldson, T. (Eds.) Campus Uprisings: Perspectives for Parents, Students, Faculty, Staff and Administrators on Race, Resistance, and Hope, pp. 116-141. Teachers College Press.
- Felder, P. P.; Liggans, G.; Chirombo, F.; Freeman, Jr., S. (2020). "Programmatic Efforts and the Black Doctoral Experience: A Literature Review". In Felder, P.; Barker, M.; Gasman, M. (Eds.) SANKOFA: African American Perspectives on Race and Culture in the U.S. Doctoral Education, pp. 41-60. SUNY Press.
- Freeman, Jr., S. (2020). "Prologue: A Tribute to Dr. Kochan, the Model Mentor". In Searby, L.; E. Reames, (Eds). The Art and Science of Mentoring: A Festschrift in Honor of Dr. Frances Kochan. Charlotte, North Carolina: Information Age Publishing.
