= Pine Forge Mansion and Industrial Site =

Historic house in Pennsylvania, United States

- U.S. National Register of Historic Places
- U.S. Historic district
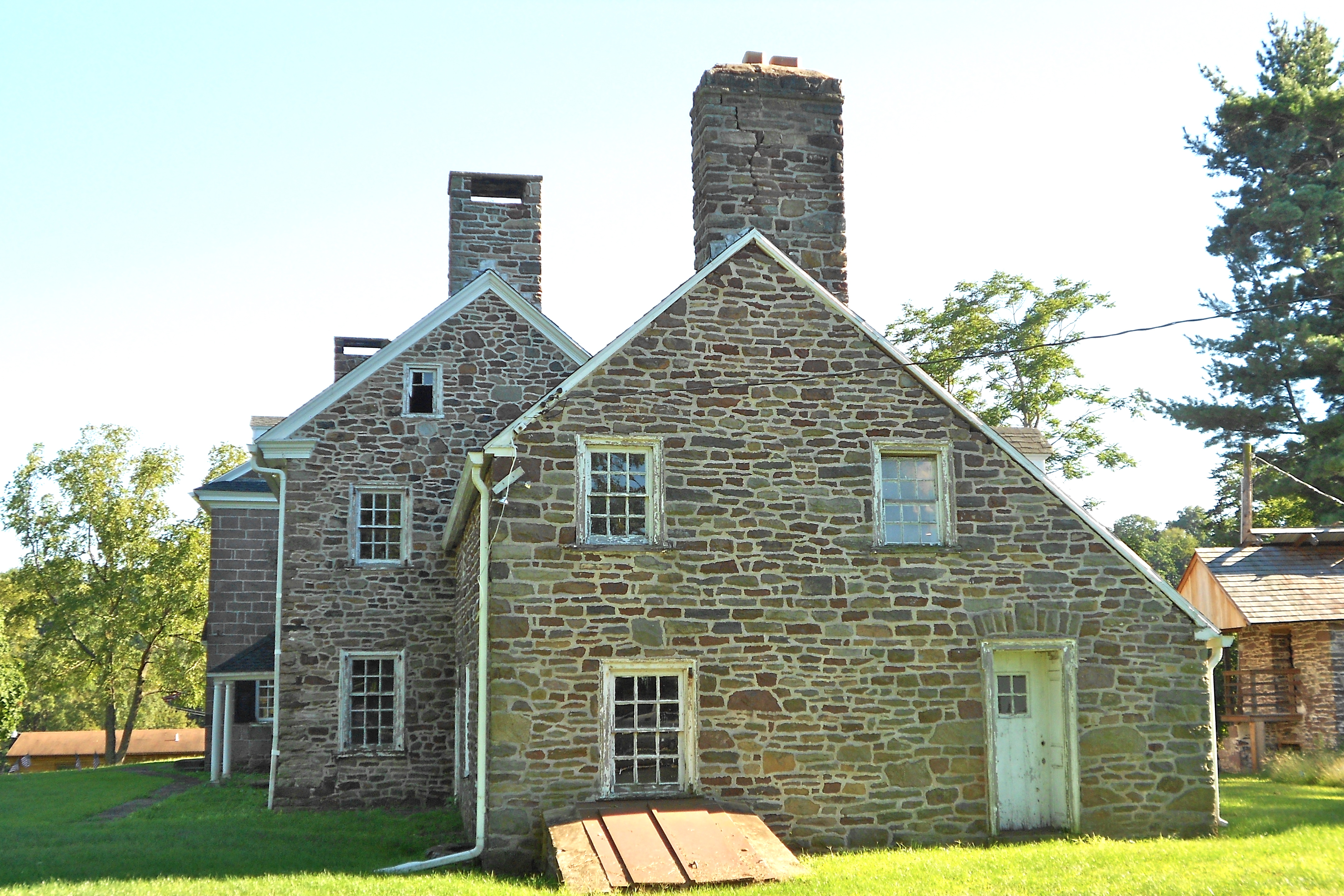

- Location within Pennsylvania Location within the United States
- Location: Pine Forge Rd and Douglass Dr., Pine Forge, Douglass Township, Pennsylvania
- Coordinates: 40°17′02″N 75°42′19″W
- Area: 24 acres (9.7 ha)
- Built: c. 1730, 1800, 1918
- Architect: R. Brognard Okie
- Architectural style: Early Republic, Federal
- MPS: Iron and Steel Resources of Pennsylvania MPS
- NRHP reference No.: 04000191
- Added to NRHP: March 18, 2004

The Pine Forge Mansion and Industrial Site, also known as Thomas Rutter's Mansion and the Pine Forge Iron Plantation, is an historic iron plantation and mansion and national historic district located in Douglass Township, Berks County, Pennsylvania, United States.

It was listed on the National Register of Historic Places in 2004.

== History and architectural features ==
This district has five contributing buildings, four contributing sites, and one contributing structure. They are the stone mansion or manor house, stone root cellar and smokehouse, "caretaker's cottage," garage, and small stone "worker's" house. The original section of the manor house was built about 1730, with additions made circa 1800 and in 1918. The contributing sites are the remains of a dam, remains of a grist mill, and ruins of two stone buildings. The contributing structure is the remains of a mill race. The property now the site of Pine Forge Academy.

== Gallery ==
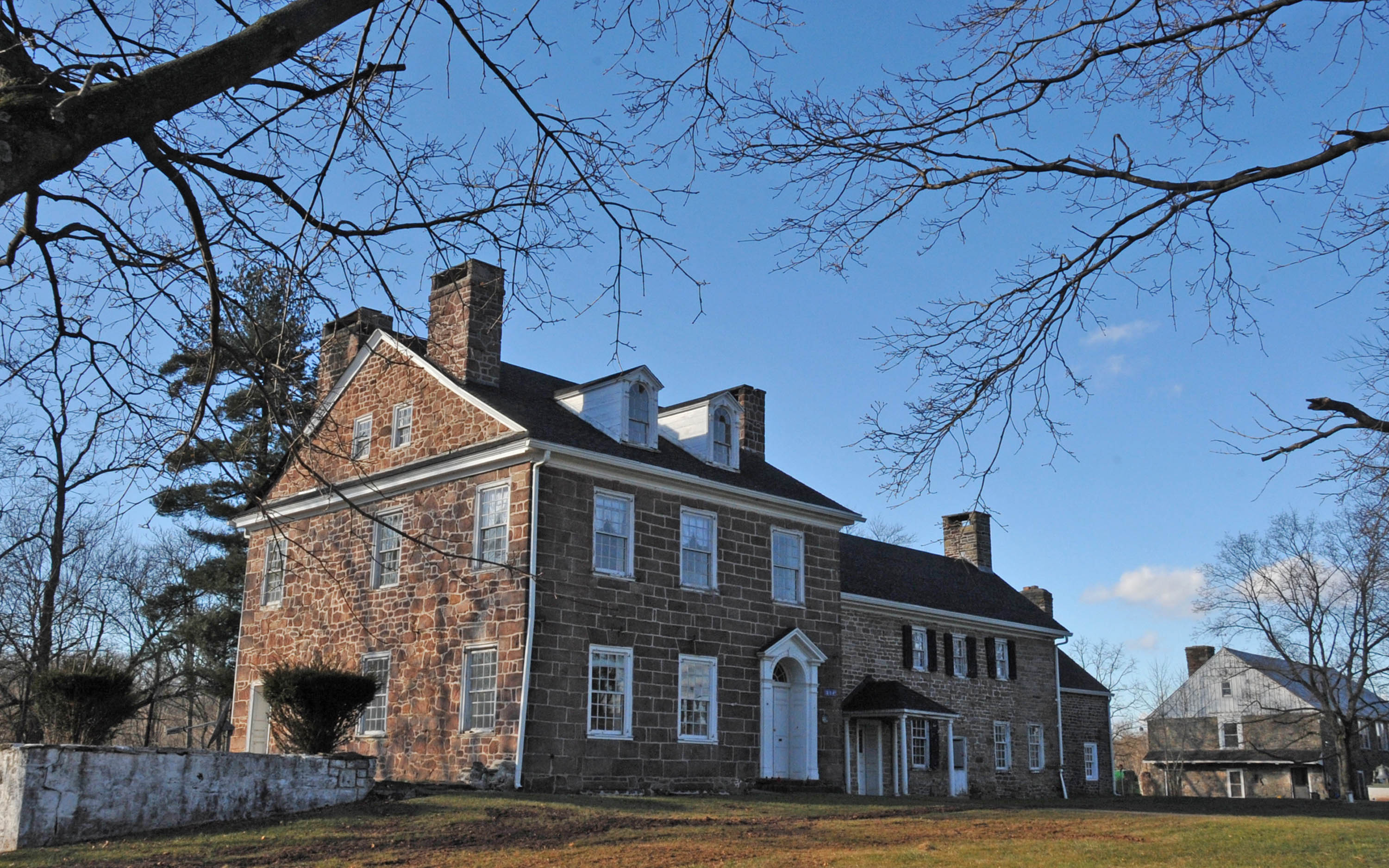
