= Pine Forge Academy =

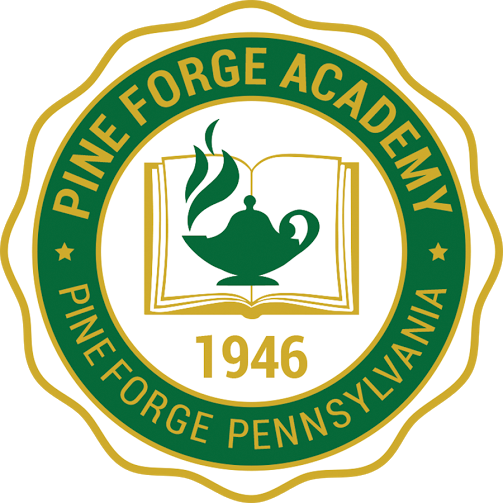

Location
- Boyertown, Pennsylvania; 40°16′56″N 75°42′11″W

Information
- School type: High School
- Motto: "Where Excellence is no accident"
- Founded: 1946
- Principal: Addriene Rhodes
- Faculty: 25 (on FTE basis)
- Grades: 9–12
- Enrollment: 148 (2019–2020)
- Student to teacher ratio: 13.9:1
- Athletics conference: Penn-Jersey Athletic Association
- Affiliation: Seventh-day Adventist Church
- Website: http://www.pineforgeacademy.org/

Pine Forge Academy is a co-educational, Seventh-day Adventist Christian boarding school that serves grades nine through twelve. Part of the Seventh-day Adventist education system, the world's second largest Christian school system, it is located in Berks County, Pennsylvania.

== History ==
The land for the school grounds was purchased for $46,000 by the school founders from the family of 18th-century abolitionist and ironmaster Thomas Rutter. The building used for the headmaster's residence (the Manor House) was once used as a staging point for the Underground Railroad. The property was listed on the National Register of Historic Places as the Pine Forge Mansion and Industrial Site in 2004.

== Notable alumni ==
- Barry Black, the 62nd Chaplain of the United States Senate.
- Phife Dawg - Rapper and member of A Tribe Called Quest.
- Clifton Davis - An American actor, songwriter, singer, and pastor.
- Sydney Freeman Jr. - Educational theorist, author, and social scientist at the University of Idaho.
- David A. Arnold - The late stand-up comedian, sitcom writer, producer, and actor.
- Starletta DuPois - An American actor, she has shared the screen with many gifted luminaries such as James Earl Jones, Cicely Tyson, Jack Nicholson, Lou Gossett Jr. Robert Duvall, Steve Harvey, Gena Rowlands, Marla Gibbs, Denzel Washington and the late James Garner.

== See also ==
- List of Seventh-day Adventist secondary schools
- Seventh-day Adventist education
