= Mercy Career & Technical High School =

Location
- 2900 West Hunting Park Avenue; Philadelphia, Pennsylvania 19129; United States
- Coordinates: 40°0′21″N 75°10′35″W

Information
- Type: Private
- Religious affiliations: Roman Catholic; Sisters of Mercy
- Established: 1950
- Authority: Roman Catholic Archdiocese of Philadelphia
- President: Howie Brown
- Principal: Christian Aument
- Teaching staff: 37.0 (on a FTE basis)
- Grades: 9-12
- Gender: Coeducational
- Enrollment: 350 (2013-14)
- Student to teacher ratio: 9.5
- Colors: Red and gold
- Song: "Under Mercy's Shield"
- Athletics conference: Penn-Jersey Athletic Association
- Nickname: Monarchs
- Accreditation: Middle States Association of Colleges and Schools
- Yearbook: The Advocate
- Website: www.mercycte.org

Mercy Career & Technical High School is a private, Roman Catholic high school in Philadelphia, Pennsylvania. It is located within the Roman Catholic Archdiocese of Philadelphia. It is the only four-year co-educational Catholic vocational high school in the United States.

== History ==
Mercy was established in 1950 by the Sisters of Mercy. The school was originally known as Mercy Technical School and did not start granting high school diplomas until 1973.
