= Trayvon Reed =

American basketball player (born 1995)

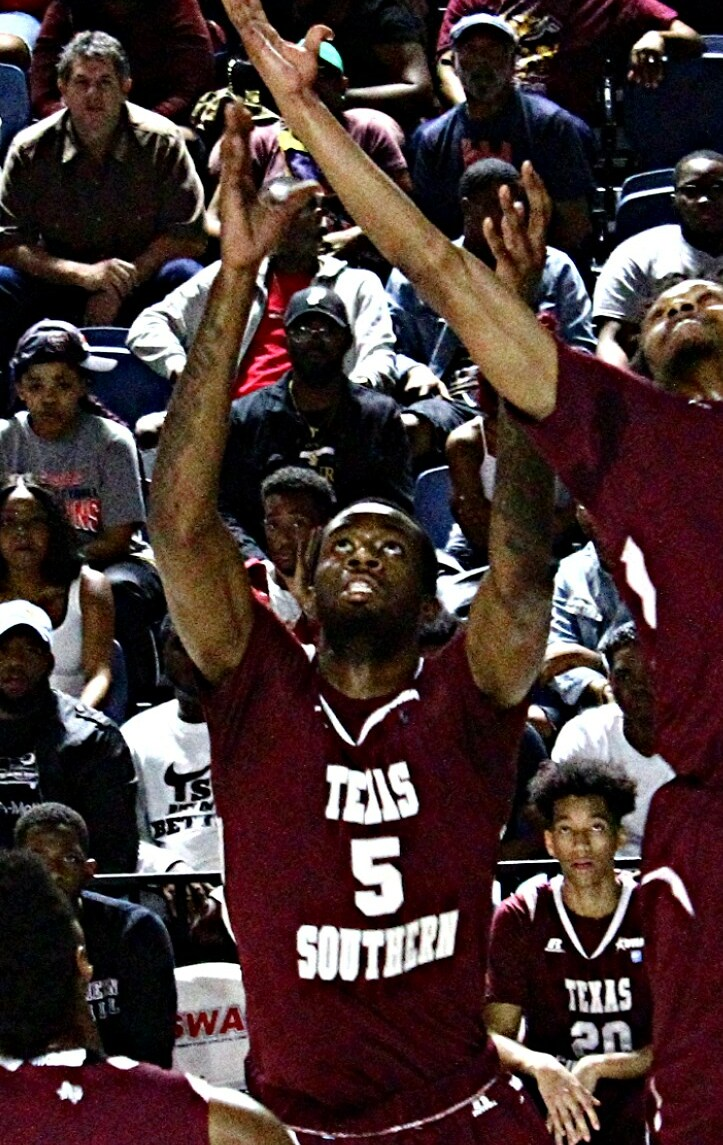
- Reed in 2018

Sitra Club
- Position: Center
- League: Bahraini Premier League

Personal information
- Born: June 5, 1995 (age 31)
- Listed height: 7 ft 2 in (2.18 m)
- Listed weight: 240 lb (109 kg)

Career information
- High school: Life Center Academy (Burlington, New Jersey)
- College: Auburn (2014–2015); Texas Southern (2017–2019)
- NBA draft: 2019: undrafted
- Playing career: 2020–present

Career history
- 2020–2021: Dinamo Tbilisi
- 2021–present: Sitra Club

Trayvon Reed (born June 5, 1995) is an American professional basketball player for Sitra Club of the Bahraini Premier League.

== Early life ==
Growing up, Reed moved from Mobile, Alabama to Montgomery, Alabama, and eventually to Snellville, Georgia. In 2013, he joined D'Angelo Russell, Grayson Allen and Joel Berry on an AAU team that won a national title. Reed also attended the NBPA Top 100 camp for two years. He transferred to Life Center Academy in New Jersey for his senior year for a better academic foundation and also to play under coach and former NBA player Pervis Ellison. A four-star recruit, Reed signed with Maryland.

== College career ==
Reed was not allowed to enroll at Maryland after he was caught shoplifting at a 7-Eleven convenience store in July 2014. After a police officer attempted to arrest Reed, he attempted to flee and became engaged in a scuffle with the officer and broke two of his fingers. A second officer came over and Reed was arrested and charged with second-degree assault, second degree assault of a police officer, theft under $100 and resisting arrest. Reed served 15 days in jail. In December 2014, Reed enrolled at Auburn. During his freshman season, he averaged 1.1 points and two rebounds per game, and his best performance came in a double-overtime win against Xavier, when he posted four points, five rebounds and five blocks. He missed the following fall for personal reasons and re-enrolled and re-joined the team for the second semester while taking a redshirt. In May 2016, Reed announced he was leaving Auburn.

Reed's year off from basketball "was probably the lowest point for me," he said. However, Texas Southern coach Mike Davis offered him a scholarship, and he accepted. In Reed's junior year in 2017-18, he averaged 9.7 points and 8.8 rebounds per game and helped the Tigers reach the NCAA Tournament. During his senior season, Reed missed 11 games with a leg injury before returning in late February 2019 against Mississippi Valley State. He finished the season averaging 12.7 points, 7.7 rebounds and 1.4 blocks per game.

== Professional career ==
On August 5, 2020, Reed signed his first professional contract with Horsens IC of the Basketligaen. After not passing the tryout, he signed with BC Dinamo Tbilisi of the Georgian Superliga in October. In 2021, Reed signed with Sitra Club of the Bahraini Premier League.

== Personal life ==
Reed is the son of Nikki Reed. His older brother Jacoby was a high school basketball player but was incarcerated for robbery.
