= Life Center Academy =

Christian - Private school in Burlington County, New Jersey, United States

Location
- 2045 Burlington-Columbus Road; Burlington, Burlington County, New Jersey 08016; United States; 40.08048°N 74.79138°W

Information
- Type: Private
- Motto: Preparing Students for Life!
- Religious affiliation: Assemblies of God
- Established: 1975
- Founders: Rev. Paul and Evelyn Graban
- NCES School ID: 01655318
- Principal: Tracy Cossabone
- Headmaster: Rev. Matthew Boudwin
- Faculty: 21.1 FTEs
- Grades: Pre-K-12
- Enrollment: 219 (plus 77 in PreK, as of 2023–24)
- Student to teacher ratio: 10.4:1
- Campus: 61 acres (250,000 m^{2})
- Colors: Red; White; Black
- Athletics conference: Penn-Jersey Athletic Association
- Team name: Warrior
- Tuition: $9,950 (2025–26 for grades 9–12)
- Website: www.lcanj.org

Life Center Academy is a private school located in Burlington in Burlington County, in the U.S. state of New Jersey.

The school is associated with the Fountain of Life Center, an Assemblies of God church. The headmaster is Matthew Boudwin, who also serves as a pastor of the church. The school is divided into three sections: Little Angel Preschool, the Elementary, which contains the students from Kindergarten to 6th grade; and the Upper School, which contains the students from 7th to 12th grade. Tracy Cossabone is the principal and Julia Ferrara is the preschool director.

As of the 2023–24 school year, the school had an enrollment of 219 students (plus 77 in PreK) and 21.1 classroom teachers (on an FTE basis), for a student–teacher ratio of 10.4:1. The school's student body was 56.2% (123) Black, 18.3% (40) White, 17.4% (5) Hispanic, 5.0% (11) two or more races, 2.3% (5) Asian and 0.9% (2) Native Hawaiian / Pacific Islander.

== Athletics ==
Athletic Director: Tammy Nowicki
School colors: red, white, and black
School mascot: The Warrior
Athletic Association: Penn-Jersey Athletic Association

The Life Center Academy boys soccer team won the NACA national championship in 2001 and the NCSAA national championship in 2021 and 2024.

== Notable alumni ==
- Nysier Brooks (born 1996), professional basketball player who played for the New Taipei CTBC DEA of the Taiwan Professional Basketball League
- Elo Edeferioka (born 1993), Nigerian basketball player for Celta de Vigo Baloncesto and the Nigerian national team
- Malik Ellison (born 1996), professional basketball player for BC Kolín of the Czech National Basketball League
- Stojan Gjuroski (born 1991), professional basketball player for Pelister of the Macedonian First League
- Aleks Marić (born 1984), former professional basketball player
- Trayvon Reed (born 1995), professional basketball player for BC Dinamo Tbilisi of the Georgian Superliga
- Juliet Richardson (born 1980), singer
- LaQuinton Ross (born 1991), basketball player who played for Hapoel Eilat of the Israeli Basketball Premier League
- Dion Waiters (born 1991, class of 2010), former professional basketball player who won an NBA championship in 2020 with the Los Angeles Lakers
