= Oakwood University =

Seventh-day Adventist historically black university in Huntsville, Alabama, US

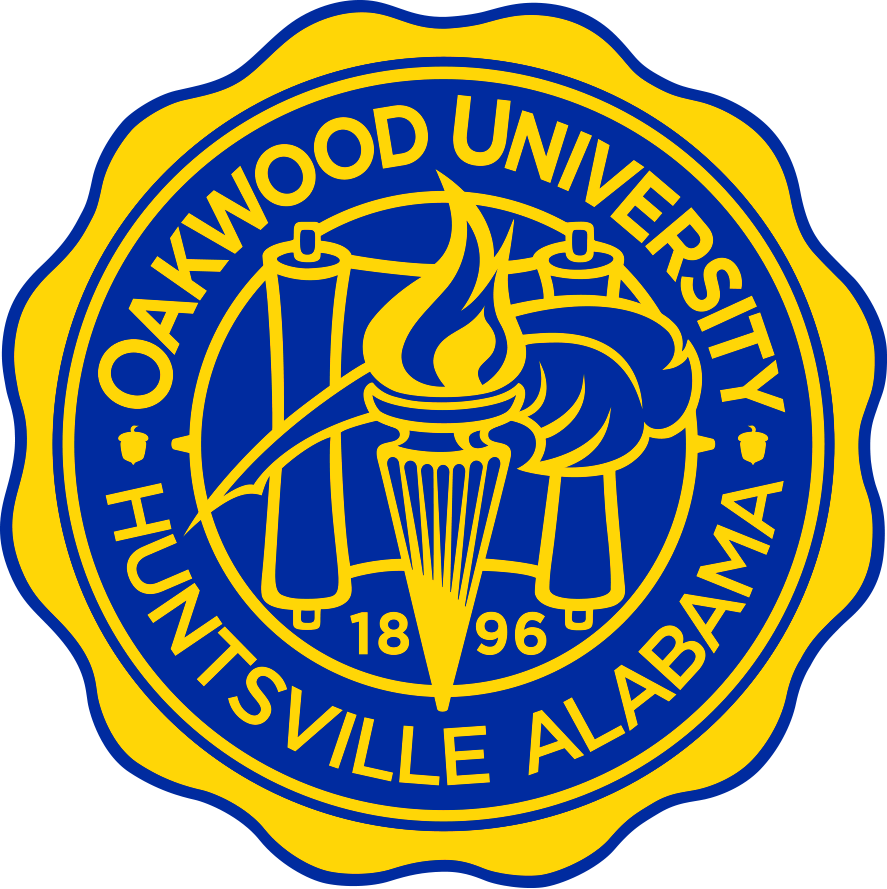
- Former names: Oakwood Industrial School (1896–????); Oakwood Manual Training School (????–1917); Oakwood Junior College (1917–1932); Oakwood College (1932–2008)
- Motto: Education, Excellence, Eternity
- Type: Private, HBCU
- Established: 1896 (130 years ago)
- Affiliations: CIC; UNCF
- Religious affiliation: Seventh-day Adventist Church
- Endowment: $15.6 million
- President: Gina Spivey-Brown
- Undergraduates: 1,810
- Location: Huntsville, Alabama, U.S. 34°45′22″N 86°39′11″W
- Campus: 1,185 acres (480 ha); Suburban
- Colors: Blue & Gold
- Nickname: Ambassadors
- Sporting affiliations: NAIA – HBCUAC
- Mascot: The Ambassador
- Website: oakwood.edu

Oakwood University is a private, historically black Seventh-day Adventist university in Huntsville, Alabama. It is the only HBCU owned and operated by the Seventh-day Adventist Church.

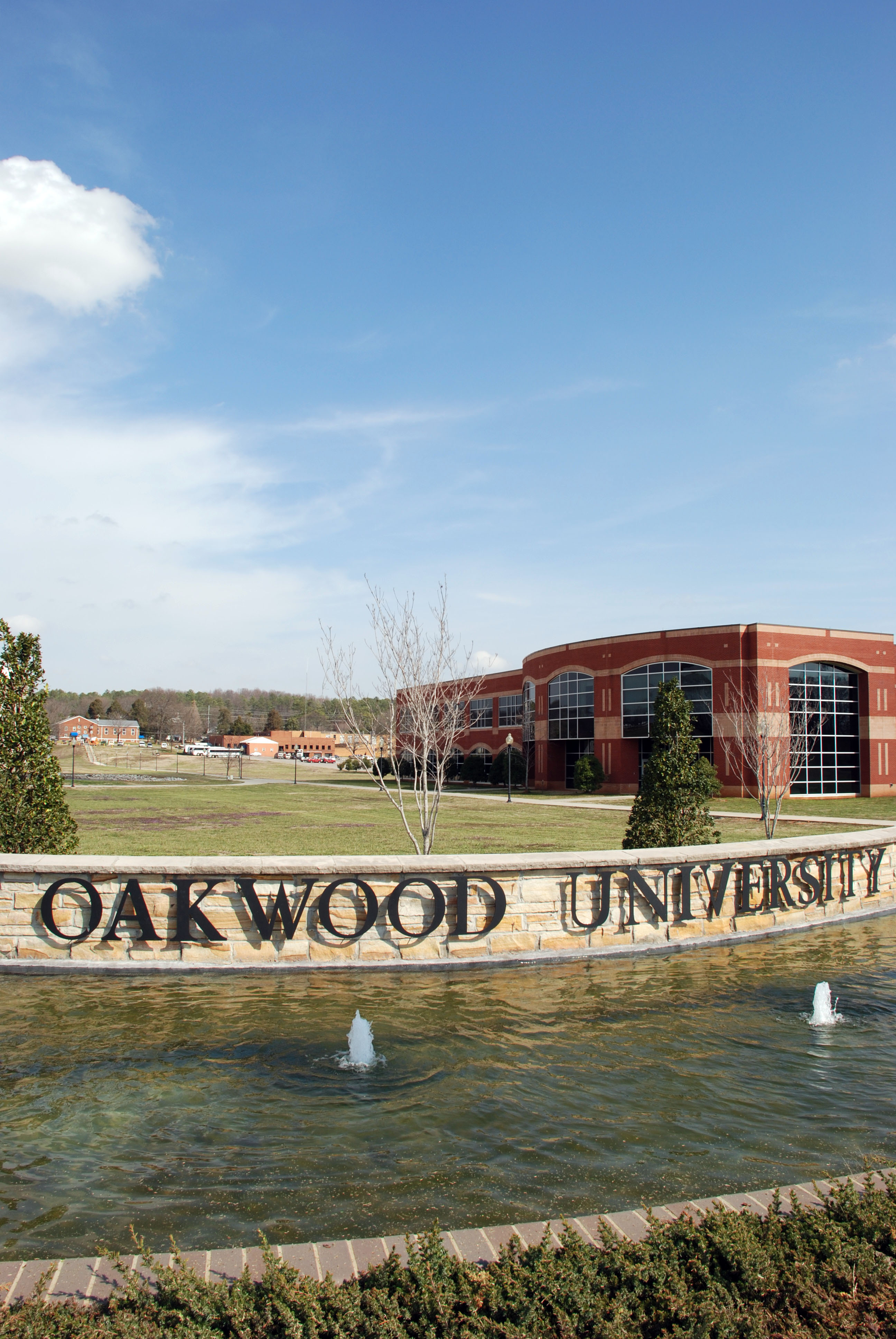

Oakwood University is accredited by the Southern Association of Colleges and Schools (SACS) and the Department of Education of the General Conference of Seventh-day Adventists (through the Adventist Accrediting Association) to award associate, baccalaureate, and master's degrees.

Oakwood University owns and operates the Christian radio station WJOU 90.1 FM, formerly WOCG.

== History ==
=== Early years ===
Oakwood University has its origins in the post-Civil and post-slavery effort to fund higher education for African-Americans who had been freed in the South. In response to the counsel of SDA Church co-founder Ellen G. White, a committee was appointed by the General Conference of the Seventh-day Adventist Church to buy property and create a school that offers vocational education and spiritual direction to African-American students. In January 1896, the committee bought for $6,700 the 360-acre (1.5 km^{2}) plantation that had been owned by the enslavers of Dred Scott. That same year, Oakwood University was founded as Oakwood Industrial School in Huntsville, Alabama, under the authority of the General Conference.

Named for the oak trees surrounding it and the white SDA Church leaders' belief that industrial work is fitting for southern African-Americans, students were initially required to work in industrial positions on-campus to pay for their tuition. Their jobs included machine shop and farm work for male students and print shop, laundry and tailor shop work for female students. Classes commenced in November 1896 with 16 students enrolled. Solon Marquis Jacobs served as the school's first principal beginning in 1896 and, in 1917, James Irving Beardsley was appointed the first president. By that same year, the school offered a theology program as well as a programs for various trades, such as farming, teaching, masonry, and pre-nursing. Prior to 1917, the school was renamed Huntsville Training School and Oakwood Manual Training School before it became Oakwood Junior College.

=== Social activism ===
In 1931, after years of student complaints about school conditions—including "heavy work schedules, low wages, the inability to accumulate academic credit due to the workloads" and racial segregation on campus—students went on strike, petitioning for better conditions, liberal arts programs, more African American faculty members and an African American president. In 1932, after student strikers held a series of pep rallies, speeches and worship gatherings and sent a letter to the General Conference petitioning for change, the General Conference recruited more African Americans to Oakwood's faculty, making it predominantly African American. Additionally, the General Conference first invited two of Oakwood's white professors to become president in response to the strikes and petitions. It was only after the professors rejected the invitation that was it extended to James L. Moran, Oakwood's first African American president. Although Moran became president, the General Conference asserted that a white man would manage the school's business affairs and serve as the liaison between the school board and the General Conference, two roles typically held by the president of a higher education institution. It was under the leadership of President Moran that Oakwood attained earned four-year college status and was renamed Oakwood College.

Due to the conservative ideologies of the SDA Church, students' initial involvement in the civil rights movement of the 1950s and 1960s was restrained. Oakwood's non-participation stance, declared by the General Conference, discouraged faculty involvement in the movement. Despite this, after Oakwood hosted guest speaker Martin Luther King Jr. in 1962—and was the only institution in Huntsville that would host him—some Oakwood students became moderately active in the movement. Because the SDA ideologies discouraged association with those outside of the church, Oakwood students were disconnected from those at neighboring schools. Also, their access to news outlets such as radio and television was restricted and completely banned in dormitories, limiting their awareness of ongoing events related to the civil rights movement.

The Church and the South's expectations for women hindered female students' freedom to choose to participate in civil resistance events, if they desired to do so. However, students were able to stay informed of protests through local black-owned radio station WEUP, and male students had more freedom in choosing whether to participate in sit-ins, prayer-ins and marches, store boycotts and other nonviolent acts of resistance. Their efforts to integrate local white SDA churches were met with hostility by segregationists. For example, white church officials called the police to remove black students from the church grounds and altered their worship service times to coincide with students' class times, preventing them from being able to attend. In spite of the SDA Church's efforts against students' activism, a few male Oakwood students formed activist coalitions with Alabama A&M University students or formed their own small activist groups which attempted to obtain service at establishments throughout Huntsville that would only serve white patrons.

=== Accreditation and growth ===
Oakwood began with an initial enrollment of 16 students in 1896, and increased to more than 100 by 1917 and 200 in 1927.

It was initially accredited as a junior college in 1943, and the school's first baccalaureate degrees were awarded in 1945.

Between 1958 and 1963, Oakwood made progress toward full senior college accreditation by the Southern Association of Colleges and Schools, and joined the United Negro College Fund in 1964.

Oakwood's enrollment reached over 1,000 in 1974, and from 1973 to 1982, the number of graduates increased from 124 to 200.

By 2003, Oakwood offered liberal arts and professional degrees, and had an enrollment of approximately 1,700 with representation from 38 countries.

In 2008, Oakwood College was renamed Oakwood University and was approved to offer a graduate program in religion. That same year, enrollment increased to 1,865 with representation from 42 U.S. states and 30 countries. By fall 2012, enrollment reached 2,019.

In 2014, Oakwood was approved to transfer from sponsorship under the General Conference to sponsorship under the North American Division.

In 2016, Oakwood achieved full accreditation by the Adventist Accrediting Association.

== Academics ==
Oakwood University offers undergraduate and graduate degrees through the following schools:

- School of Arts & Sciences
- School of Business & Information Systems
- School of Education & Social Sciences
- School of Nursing & Health Professions
- School of Theology

In 2004, Oakwood entered into a subcontractor agreement with Science Applications International Corp. (SAIC) through the Unified NASA Information Technology Services (UNITeS) program. By partnering to offer wireless technology support at Oakwood, ISO 9002 certification audit compliance, network engineering training, Federal contract training and human resources laboratory development, Oakwood and SAIC have been able to provide Oakwood students and graduates with STEM and business internships and part- and full-time work, generating ongoing business for the Oakwood community while supporting the space industry.

In 2009, Oakwood was the first HBCU to enter NASA's Mentor-Protégé signing agreement with SAIC. Through the three-year agreement, SAIC continued to provide Oakwood with technology enhancement, contract management and business administration support and would also begin offering technical and engineering internships to students. By 2015, Oakwood had entered into similar contracts with Boeing, Leidos and Honeywell, among others.

== Student activities ==
There are over 30 clubs and organizations on campus.

=== Musical groups ===
The Aeolians, Oakwood University's premier touring ensemble, was founded in 1946 by former professor, Dr. Eva B. Dykes. This choir has 45–60 members from various disciplines, and the group travels nationally and internationally as musical ambassadors for the university. The choir has visited Romania, Great Britain, Poland, Jamaica, and Bermuda among other locations. The group has also performed at the White House for President Bill Clinton and at the Kennedy Center, both in Washington, D.C. Other musical ensembles on campus include gospel choirs Dynamic Praise, Voices of Triumph, the group Serenity winners of the First Season of "Making The Group" reality show competition. Oakwood University is known for its legacy of great music. In 2010, an Oakwood-based vocal group, Committed, won the a capella TV competition The Sing-off. In 2017, the choir was named Choir of the World at the National Eisteddfod of Wales Music Festival. The group is featured in Jacob Collier's 2019 recording and video of Lionel Richie's song All Night Long (All Night).

=== Academic competitions ===
At the 2008 Honda Campus All-Star Challenge National Championship Tournament in Orlando, Florida, Oakwood University team members brought home the trophy. This competition featured 64 teams from historically black colleges and universities around the nation. In addition to winning the championship, Oakwood University received a grant of $50,000 from the American Honda Motor Company. Both the quiz bowl and basketball teams adjusted their playing schedules to not play on Saturday, the day observed as the Sabbath (Oakwood University is a Seventh-day Adventist institution), and both teams still emerged as champions over Alcorn State University. At the 2009 Honda Campus All-Star Challenge National Championship Tournament, the team, led by captain Alesis Turner, returned to again be named the champions (the team played in the final rounds against North Carolina Central University). In 2017, Oakwood for the third time won the HCASC Tournament, defeating Bowie State University in the finals without losing a game the entire tournament. 2017 marked the 28th season of the tournament. The school joins Tuskegee University, Florida A&M University, and Morehouse College, as the only schools to win back-to-back championships at HCASC.

== Athletics ==
The Oakwood athletic teams are called the Ambassadors and Lady Ambassadors. The university is a member of the National Association of Intercollegiate Athletics (NAIA), primarily competing in the HBCU Athletic Conference (HBCUAC), formerly the Gulf Coast Athletic Conference (GCAC), since the 2023-24 academic year. The Ambassadors and Lady Ambassadors previously competed as a member of the United States Collegiate Athletic Association (USCAA) until after the 2021–22 school year.

Oakwood competes in five intercollegiate varsity sports: men's teams include baseball, basketball and soccer; while women's teams include basketball, soccer, softball and volleyball.

=== Intramurals ===
The university also offers several intramural sport activities.

=== Move to the NAIA ===
On January 20, 2022, Oakwood got an invitation to join the GCAC, along with Wiley College and the return of Southern University at New Orleans, effective beginning in July 2022. The GCAC is an athletic conference affiliated with the NAIA.

=== Men's basketball ===
The Ambassadors men's basketball team won the 2008 USCAA National Championship in the team's first season a member of the association. The Ambassadors won their second USCAA Division I National Championship in March 2012 against Rochester College, and their third in March 2016. The university became the first college or university in Alabama to win three men's basketball championships when the Ambassadors defeated Concordia College to win the 2016 USCAA Division I National Championship. The Ambassadors men's basketball team won the university's fourth title in 2019 with a 58–57 win against Bluefield State.

== Adventist Colleges Abroad ==
Adventist Colleges Abroad is a program that allows Oakwood students to spend time studying at Adventist universities outside of the United States while earning credit for the degree they are pursuing at Oakwood.

== Principals and presidents ==
Everyone who served between 1896 and 1917 was a principal. Everyone listed afterward was a president.

- Solon Marquis Jacobs, 1896–1897
- Henry S. Shaw, 1897–1899
- Benn Eugene Nicola, 1899–1904
- Fred R. Rogers, 1904–1905
- Granville H. Baber, 1905–1906
- Walter James Blake, 1906–1911
- Clarence Jesse Boyd, 1911–1917
- James I. Beardsley, 1917–1923
- Joseph A. Tucker, 1923–1932
- Frank Loris Peterson, 1945–1954
- Garland Jefferson Millet, 1954–1963
- Addison Vastapha Pinkney, 1963–1966
- Frank W. Hale Jr., 1966–1971
- Calvin B. Rock, 1971–1985
- Benjamin F. Reaves, 1985–1996
- Delbert W. Baker, 1996–2010
- Leslie N. Pollard, 2010–2025
- Gina Spivey-Brown, 2025-present

== Notable alumni ==
Name	Class year	Notability	Reference(s)
Delbert Baker	1975	Administrator, educator, author and former president of Oakwood University (currently serves on the White House Board for HBCUs)	
Barry Black		former U.S. Navy Chief of Chaplains and Chaplain of the U.S. Senate	
Ronald Brise		Florida State Representative	
Angela Brown		Soprano Opera Singer	
Alvin Chea		Member of the gospel group Take 6	
Clifton Davis		Actor, Pastor, Singer, Songwriter	
T. R. M. Howard	1931	Civil Rights Leader, Surgeon, Entrepreneur, Mentor to Medgar Evers and Fannie Lou Hamer	
Heather Knight	1982	President of Pacific Union College	
Davido		Nigerian Afropop musician	
Brian McKnight		R&B Singer/musician, and also brother of alumnus Claude McKnight	
Claude McKnight		Member of the gospel group Take 6	
Wintley Phipps		Pastor, Singer, Founder and President of U.S. Dream Academy	
John F. Street		Former mayor of Philadelphia, Pennsylvania	
Mervyn Warren		Member of the gospel group Take 6	
Committed		Winners of Season 2, NBC's The Sing Off	
Amber Bullock	2011	Winner of Season 4 BET's Sunday Best	
Little Richard		American recording artist, singer-songwriter and actor.	
Eric Thomas	2001	Pastor, Motivational Speaker, Author, and Educator.	
Sydney Freeman Jr.		Educational theorist, author, and social scientist at the University of Idaho.	

== See also ==
- List of Seventh-day Adventist colleges and universities
- List of historically black colleges of the United States
- Seventh-day Adventist education
