= Delbert Baker =

American minister

Delbert W. Baker
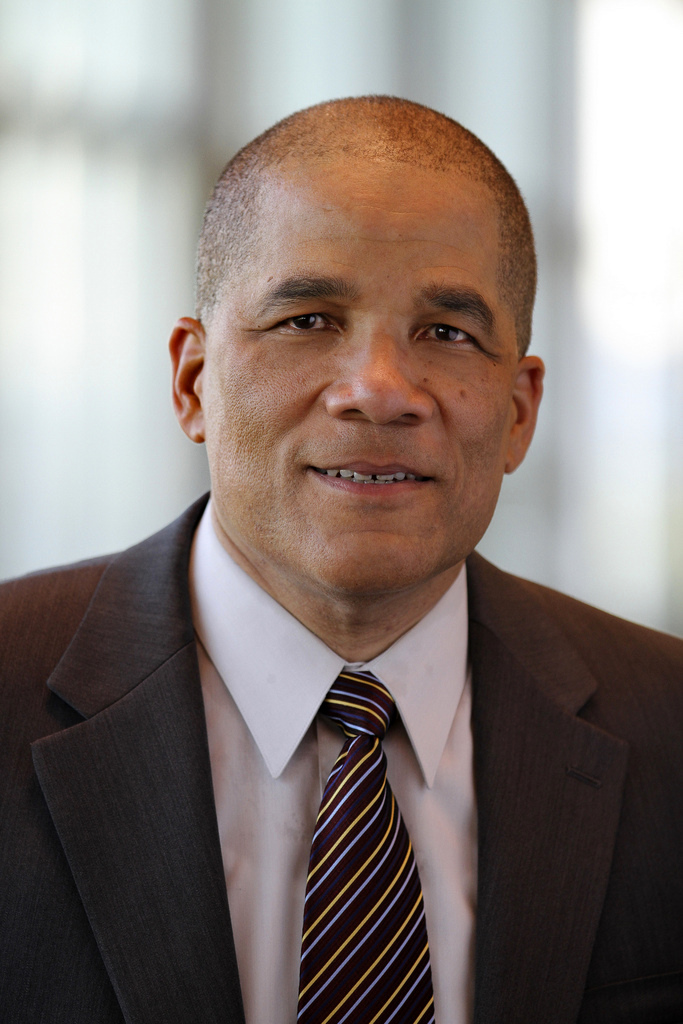
- Born: 1953 (age 72–73); Oakland, California
- Education: Oakwood University, Andrews University, Howard University, Harvard University

Ecclesiastical career
- Church: Seventh-day Adventist
- Writings: 20 authored/edited books
- Offices held: President of Oakwood University; Vice President of the General Conference of Seventh-day Adventists; Vice Chancellor of Adventist University of Africa

Delbert W. Baker is a Seventh-day Adventist minister, author, educator, and administrator. Formerly the tenth president of Oakwood University (1996–2010) and a vice president of the General Conference of Seventh-day Adventists (2010–2015), Baker is currently the vice chancellor of the Adventist University of Africa.

== Education and Family ==
Baker was born in 1953 in Oakland, California. He holds a BA in Ministerial Theology from Oakwood College, a Master of Divinity from Andrews University, and a PhD in communications from Howard University. He is married to the former Susan Lee, a physical therapist and educator. The couple has three adult sons.

== Career ==
Baker's professional experience includes ten years of pastoring (1975–1985), seven years as editor of Message (1985–1992), and four years as vice president and professor of Religion at Loma Linda University and Medical Center (1992–1996). He has authored or edited over 20 books, most notably The Unknown Prophet, From Exile to Prime Minister, and Telling the Story, and written over 500 articles.

Baker was the tenth president of Oakwood University from 1996 to 2010. Under his leadership the university experienced significant growth including increased enrollment; enlarged land holdings; construction and/or purchase of five major facilities; major renovations on numerous campus structures; and development of a comprehensive award-winning technology network. Fund-raising efforts were remarkable with approximately $90 million raised through donations and grants. During his tenure the campus received awards for academics, beauty, and community service. For the length of his tenure Oakwood University was listed in U.S. News & World Report as among the best colleges in the Southern region. Baker served on the White House Advisory for HBCUs for five years; testified before several congressional committees; and received awards from the White House, UNCF, Alumnus of the Year from his alma mater, and many civic and educational organizations. Also during his presidency, Baker completed marathons to raise funds for student scholarships on all seven continents and the North Pole, and 35 of the 50 states in the U.S., that raised more than $500,000 in a scholarship endowment.

From 2010 to 2015 Baker was a vice president of the General Conference of Seventh-day Adventists. In 2012 and 2013, he coordinated the worldwide Great Controversy/Great Hope Global Sharing Program that distributed more than 142 million copies of the Ellen G. White classic The Great Controversy. In response to increasing crises and global hot spots, Baker provided leadership for the establishment of the worldwide GC crisis leadership preparation project that resulted in all SDA world divisions developing and maintaining crisis readiness. In collaboration with the Health Ministries Department, Baker also coordinated the establishment of the global comprehensive health ministry program and worked with efforts to stem the spread of Ebola in West Africa. In 2013 he led out in a successful campaign for the release of Seventh-day Adventist minister Antonio Monteiro from prison after being falsely incarcerated for 22 months in Togo, Africa.

In November 2015 Baker accepted a call to be the vice chancellor (president) of the Adventist University of Africa, located near Nairobi, Kenya.

== See also ==
- General Conference of Seventh-day Adventists
- Historically black colleges and universities
- Loma Linda University
- Oakwood University
- Adventist University of Africa
- Seventh-day Adventist Church
