= Dynamic Praise =

Gospel choir

- Origin: Oakwood University, Huntsville, Alabama United States
- Genres: Gospel; Traditional gospel Contemporary gospel Praise and Worship
- Years active: 1988–present
- Labels: Madison Avenue Records

Dynamic Praise (DP) is a student- and young adult-led gospel choir affiliated with Oakwood University in Huntsville, Alabama. First organized in 1988, the choir has performed across the United States and internationally.

== History ==
Founded in the fall of 1988, the gospel choir had Owen Simons as its first director. Simons handed the choir leadership over to Andrew "Benji" Young, a peer mentor. Subsequent choir directors included Bruce Bean and Bryce Davis.

The choir has traveled across the country and into the international waters. Dynamic Praise has shared the stage with such artists as Richard Smallwood, Kirk Franklin, Yolanda Adams, Donnie McClurkin, CeCe Winans, Dottie Peoples, Byron Cage, Lamar Campbell, Jonathan Nelson, Dathan Thigpen, Kelly Price, and many more. The choir also has alumnus roster consisting of such artist as Take 6, Virtue, Sean Simmonds, Duawne Starling, Carmen Hope, Lee Cort, Committed and Grandpa Cletus.

== Discography ==
=== Albums ===
- Faith (2001)
- Testify (2007)

== Filmography ==
=== DVD ===
Release date	Title	Artwork
March 22, 2008	Testify: The Live Concert DVD	
