= Penn-Jersey Athletic Association =

Sports conference in New Jersey and Pennsylvania

The Penn-Jersey Athletic Association is a sports conference of private schools in the Philadelphia metropolitan area including schools in both New Jersey and Pennsylvania.

The conference was re-created in 1990 with 13 member schools after a previous incarnation of the league had died out in 1986.

== Sports ==
Sports competition is offered across the school year by season include:

- Fall - Cross County (boys and girls), Soccer (boys and girls), Girls Tennis, and Girls Volleyball
- Winter - Basketball (boys and girls)
- Spring - Softball, Baseball, Track and Field (boys and girls) and Boys Tennis

== Member schools ==
As of 2023, member schools are:

- AIM Academy, Conshohocken, PA
- Church Farm School, Exton, PA
- Community Academy, Philadelphia, PA
- Cristo Rey, Philadelphia, PA
- Delaware Valley Friends School, Paoli, PA
- Foundation Collegiate Academy, Trenton, NJ
- Girard College, Philadelphia, PA
- International Christian High School, Philadelphia, PA
- Kimberton Waldorf School, Phoenixville, PA
- Kohelet Yeshiva High School, Merion Station, PA
- Life Center Academy, Burlington, NJ
- Mastery High School of Camden, Camden, NJ
- Mercy Vocational High School, Philadelphia, PA
- The Mesivta High School of Greater Philadelphia, Bala Cynwyd, PA
- Morrisville High School, Morrisville, PA
- New Foundations Charter, Philadelphia, PA
- The Phelps School, Malvern, PA
- Philadelphia Classical School, Philadelphia, PA
- Pine Forge Academy, Pine Forge, PA
- School Lane Charter School, Bensalem, PA
- Solebury School, New Hope, PA
- Villa Victoria Academy, West Trenton, NJ
- Woodlynde School, Strafford, PA
