= Delaware Valley Friends School =

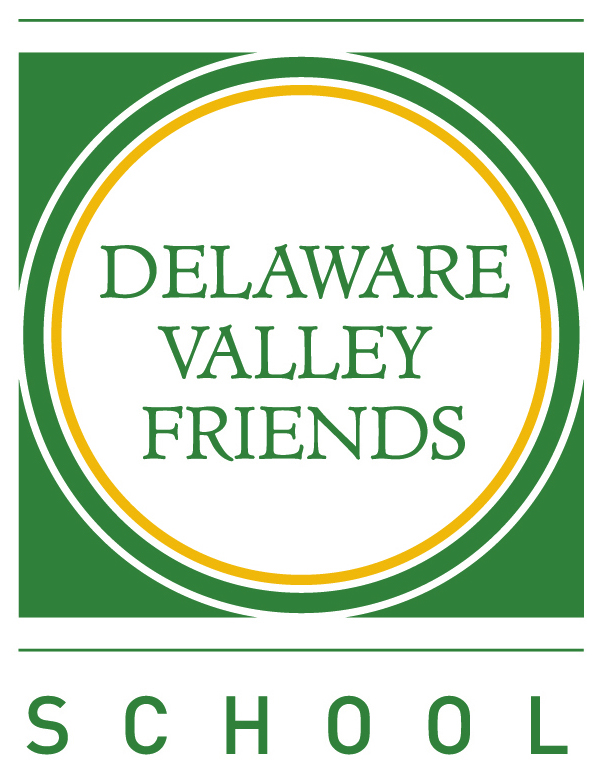

Location
- 19 East Central Avenue; Paoli, Pennsylvania 19301; United States; 40.0443056°N 75.4839044°W

Information
- Type: Special education
- Religious affiliation: Society of Friends
- Head of school: Kirk Smothers
- Teaching staff: 30.8 (on an FTE basis)
- Grades: 1-12
- Enrollment: 208 (2015-16)
- Student to teacher ratio: 4.9
- Campus type: Large suburb
- Website: www.dvfs.org

Delaware Valley Friends School (DVFS) is a private school in Paoli, Pennsylvania, located in the Greater Philadelphia region. One of the Friends schools, DVFS describes its mission as serving "bright students who learn differently," teaching students in grades 1–12 with learning differences such as dyslexia and ADHD.

DVFS is one of two Quaker schools in the Philadelphia area equipped to serve children with learning disabilities.

== Athletics ==
DVFS Dragons compete in the Penn-Jersey Athletic Association. The school has a no cut policy for all sports.

Fall

- Cross Country Varsity Co-Ed
- Soccer Girls Varsity
- Soccer Boys Varsity
- Soccer Boys Junior Varsity
- Tennis Girls Varsity

Winter

- Basketball Girls Varsity
- Basketball Girls Middle School
- Basketball Boys Varsity
- Basketball Boys Junior Varsity
- Basketball Boys Middle School

Spring

- Golf Varsity Co-Ed
- Golf Junior Varsity Co-Ed
- Lacrosse Girls Varsity
- Lacrosse Boys Varsity
- Tennis Varsity Co-Ed
- Ultimate Frisbee Co-Ed
- Volleyball Co-Ed, non-competitive

== Demographics ==
The demographic breakdown of the 150 students enrolled in 2015-16 was:

- Asian - 4.7%
- Black - 14.7%
- Hispanic - 2.7%
- White - 71.3%
- Multiracial - 6.7%
