= WJOU =

- Huntsville, Alabama; United States
- Frequency: 90.1 MHz (HD Radio)
- Branding: Praise 90.1 FM

Programming
- Format: Christian music
- Subchannels: HD2: Hymn "Oakwood Sounds"; HD3: Urban contemporary gospel "Gospel Sounds"; HD4: Christian talk and teaching "Praise Talk"

Ownership
- Owner: Oakwood University

History
- First air date: April 17, 1979
- Former call signs: WOCG
- Call sign meaning: Joy/Oakwood University

Technical information
- Licensing authority: FCC
- Facility ID: 49943
- Class: C3
- ERP: 25,000 watts
- HAAT: 70 meters (230 feet)
- Transmitter coordinates: 34°45′28″N 86°39′44″W

Links
- Public license information: Public file; LMS
- Webcast: Listen Live; Listen Live (HD2); Listen Live (HD3); Listen Live (HD4)
- Website: wjou.org

WJOU (90.1 FM, "Praise 90.1 FM") is a non-commercial, listener-supported college radio station licensed to Huntsville, Alabama, and owned and operated by Oakwood University. It serves the Oakwood University community and the Tennessee Valley area.

The station began back in the early/mid-1970s as a powerline-fed carrier current AM station operating as WOAK. The broadcast FM station had held the WOCG call letters since it was initially licensed by the Federal Communications Commission but on January 4, 2008, the callsign was changed to WJOU. This change was made to reflect the January 1, 2008 change of Oakwood College's name to Oakwood University.

Former logo

== Programming ==
WJOU plays a blend of Christian contemporary, urban contemporary gospel, and adult contemporary music that they call "Inspirational Soul". The station also airs brief educational and spiritually uplifting programs.

Notable alumni of this station include comedian Jonathan Slocumb, talk radio host and producer Hallerin Hilton Hill, broadcaster Toni Neal, plus FlavaTV host and disc jockey Skip Cheatham.
