= Adventist University of Africa =

Pan-African postgraduate University

- AUA
- Motto: Developing Leaders for Service
- Type: Private
- Established: 2006
- Accreditation: Commission for University Education, Kenya and the Accrediting Association of Seventh-day Adventist Schools, Colleges and Universities
- Affiliations: Seventh-day Adventist Church
- Chancellor: Dr. Harrington Akombwa
- Vice-Chancellor: Dr. Vincent Richard Injety
- Location: Nairobi, Kenya; 1.401239°S 36.722595°E
- Colors: Blue and Gold
- Website: www.aua.ac.ke

== About ==
The Adventist University of Africa is a Seventh-day Adventist university that offers postgraduate education with a mandate to train leaders to serve both the Church and Society. The University is accredited by the Commission for University Education, Kenya and the Accrediting Association of Seventh-day Adventist Schools, Colleges, and Universities.

== Schools and Programmes offered ==
Adventist University of Africa (AUA) has two Schools: the Theological Seminary and the School of Postgraduate Studies. The Seminary offers the following theological programmes:

- Master of Arts in Pastoral Theology
- Master of Arts in Missiology
- Master of Arts in Biblical and Theological Studies
- Master of Chaplaincy
- Master of Divinity
- Doctor of Ministry (DMin)
- Doctor of Philosophy, Biblical and Theological Studies

While the School of Postgraduate Studies offers the following programmes:

- Master of Arts in Leadership
- Master of Business Administration (MBA)
- Master of Public Health (MPH)
- Master of Science in Applied Computer Science
- Doctor of Philosophy, Leadership

== Location ==
Adventist University of Africa has its headquarters in East-Central Africa Division of the Seventh-day Adventist Church, Nairobi, Kenya. The courses are taught at various extension instructional locations such as Helderberg College, Valley View University, University of Eastern Africa, Baraton, Solusi University, and Babcock University.

== See also ==
- Andrews University
- Adventist International Institute of Advanced Studies
- Bugema University
- University of Arusha
