= Leslie Pollard =

Leslie N. Pollard
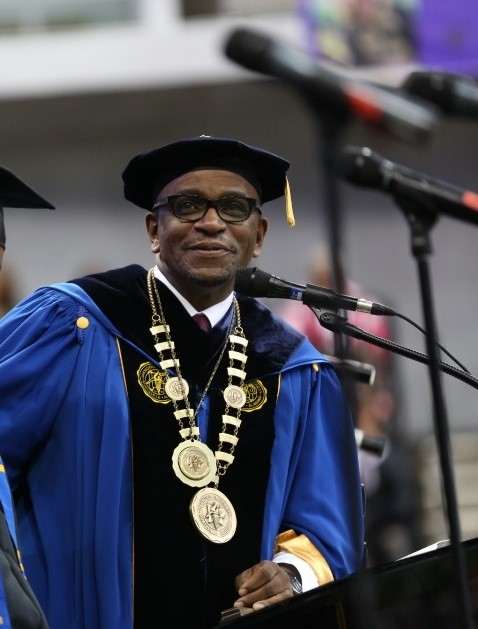
- Born: 1956 (age 69–70); New Orleans, Louisiana, US
- Education: Oakwood University, Andrews University, Claremont School of Theology, La Sierra University

Ecclesiastical career
- Church: Seventh-day Adventist
- Offices held: Pastor, Oakwood University Church; Vice President for Diversity, Loma Linda University; President, Oakwood University

Leslie N. Pollard (born 1956) is a Seventh-day Adventist minister, author, and administrator. He served as the president of Oakwood University from 2011 to 2025.

== Background ==
Leslie Nelson Pollard was born in 1956 in New Orleans, Louisiana. He holds a BA in theology from Oakwood University (1978), a Master of Divinity from Andrews University (1983), a Doctor of Ministry from Claremont School of Theology (1992), a Master of Business from La Sierra University (2005), and a PhD in New Testament Language and Literature from Andrews University Seventh-day Adventist Theological Seminary (2007).

In 1979 Pollard was married to Prudence LaBeach, a human resource specialist, educator, and author. The couple have two adult daughters, Kristin Pollard Kiel, an attorney, and Karin Pollard Smith, a pharmacist, and four grandchildren.

== Career ==
Pollard began his career in 1978 as a Seventh-day Adventist pastor. In nearly two decades of ministry, he led several notable churches, including Kansas Avenue (Riverside, California), Berean (Los Angeles, California), and Oakwood University Church (Huntsville, Alabama), and gained an international reputation as an effective evangelist.

From 1996 to 2011 Pollard was the vice president for diversity at Loma Linda University, the second individual to hold the position. Considered an authority on diversity, in 2000 he published Embracing Diversity: How to Understand and Reach People of All Cultures.

Pollard began his presidency at Oakwood University in January 2011. His tenure is notable for the launch of Oakwood Online University; more than $70 million of construction and renovation, most notably the Peters Media Center; the creation of Oakwood Organic Farms, the largest urban farm in Northern Alabama; the establishment of separate schools within the university; a considerable faculty and staff downsizing; and the placement of Oakwood University as an institution of the North American Division instead of its previous status as a General Conference institution. Pollard is also noted for a strong social media presence and involvement in national politics. In June 2022, the Oakwood University Board of Trustees voted to extend Pollard's term to June 2026.

== See also ==
- General Conference of Seventh-day Adventists
- Historically black colleges and universities
