= Iron plantation =

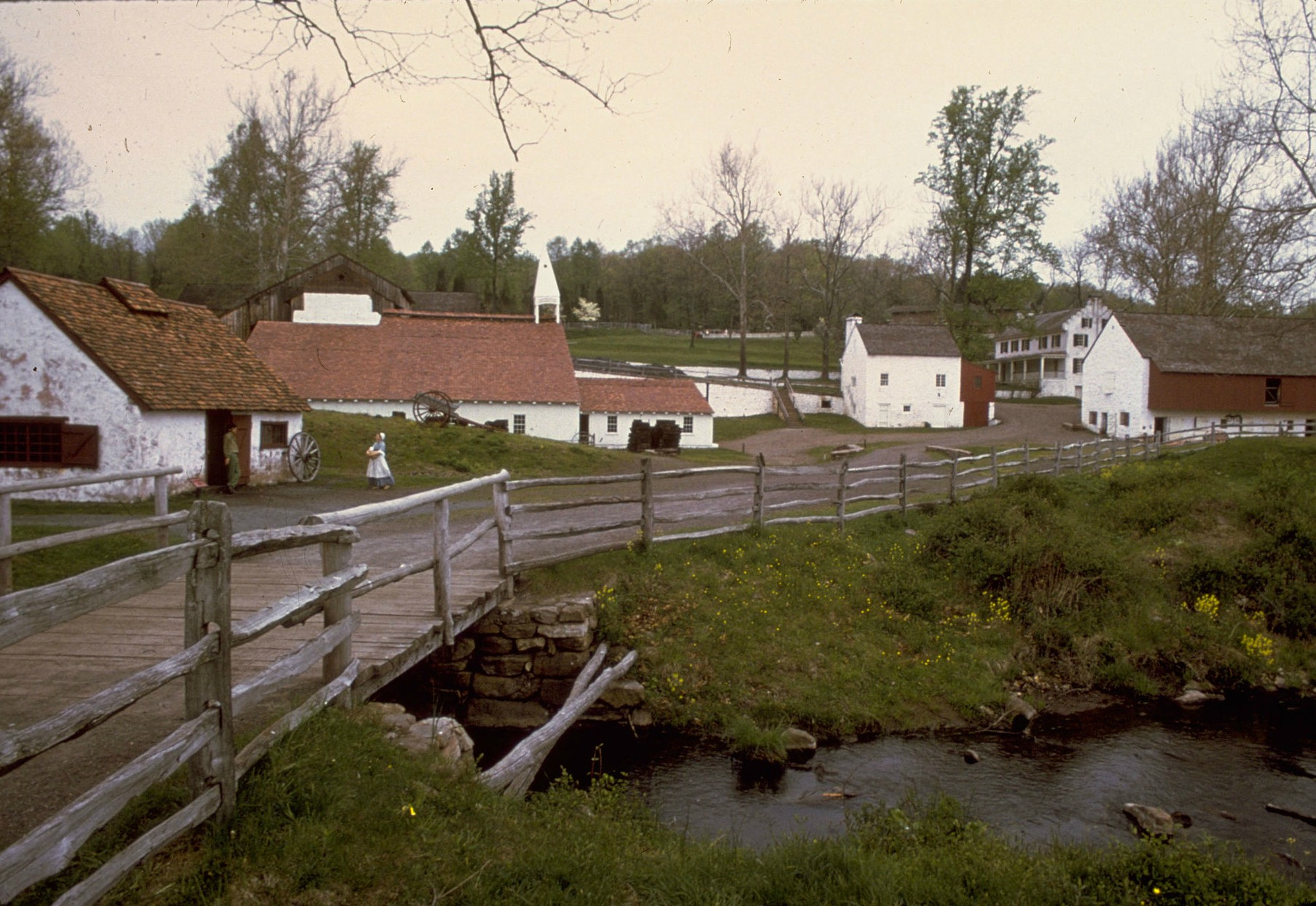
An iron plantation in the Hopewell Furnace National Historic Site a living history museum in Elverson, Pennsylvania

Iron plantations were rural localities emergent in the late-18th century and predominant in the early-19th century that specialized in the production of pig iron and bar iron from crude iron ore.

Such plantations derive their name from two sources. First, because they were nearly self-sufficient communities despite an almost singular focus on the production of iron to be sold on the market, and second, because of the large swaths of forest and land necessary to provide charcoal fuel and ore for their operations.

The first plantations stretched across the Northeast, Midwest, and Southern United States, "the chief charcoal iron producing states [being] Pennsylvania, Ohio, New York, Virginia, Connecticut, Maryland, Missouri, Tennessee, and Kentucky." Many produced raw materials used in the American Revolution or to be exported to England.

For the rest of the 19th century, however, only locations that adopted new technologies first introduced by competing coal- and coke-powered smelters in the rapidly industrializing field persisted.

== Organization and operation ==
Plantations typically consisted of a nearly self-sufficient community, including the head iron master, workers and their families, and other shopkeepers, blacksmiths, and agricultural workers needed to sustain mining and smelting operations as well as life on the plantation. Plantations were foremost land-intensive operations, commonly comprising thousands of acres. The grounds were typically defined by a conspicuous mansion, belonging to the iron master, which looked out on the charcoal furnace or iron forge from atop a geographically higher location.

The iron master was also in charge of hiring skilled labor and investing capital in construction and maintenance of charcoal furnaces and forges for the refining and working of iron. Workers on the plantation were often not paid directly in wages. Rather, the master tallied an employee’s earnings on a balance sheet, which he then offset with purchases of merchandise from the community’s stores. While an iron master lived a rather luxurious life with the opportunity to afford travel, tutors for his children, and expensive home furnishings, workers had few material possessions of their own. Workers were not well traveled outside of the plantations, and little news outside of the confines of the plantation concerned their daily lives. Notably, however, poverty was not well known on the plantations, even in times of economic depression, and workers’ wages in the United States greatly surpassed comparable wages in the European iron industry.

Work forces on iron plantations consisted of a wide array of labor and included indentured servants, slaves, and free laborers. Indentured servants composed the largest group. Indentured servants and slaves typically performed the least skilled tasks on plantations, serving as woodcutters to supply the charcoal furnaces or as miners to dig iron ore. Few opportunities were afforded to laborers for upwards mobility on plantations.

More efficient fossil fuels eventually substituted for wood-based charcoal, and “the semi-feudal iron plantation was replaced by the urban establishment and the company town” typically possessing a coke furnace.

The lack of nearby ore deposits additionally limited many plantations from being able to economically transport large quantities of ore over long distances to be smelted on the plantations themselves. Wagon transport of bar and pig iron to cities further added to costs and could run as high as forty percent of the market price per ton of pig iron in 1728, according to John Potts, a member of an iron plantation in Pennsylvania.

Iron plantations in Alabama, Tennessee, Georgia, Michigan, Wisconsin, and Missouri in particular better survived the evolving technological landscape by adopting practices that increased charcoal energy efficiency, that is, the amount of charcoal consumed per ton of iron smelted. One such technique was to raise the heights of furnaces to create a longer and more uniform reaction chamber to produce more homogeneous pig iron. Whereas antebellum furnaces were built with brick and mortar and reached only 30-35 feet in height, new furnaces remodeled in the 1840s reached as high as 65 feet. Continued demand for pig iron to be transported westward provided an additional competitive advantage to plantations in these states.

The iron industry shifted to one largely determined by the production of steel during the British Industrial Revolution and in the later half of the 19th and early 20th centuries. As such, blast furnaces, steam and electric power, and coke fuel replaced the largely land- and labor-intensive practices of iron making on plantations dependent on large tracts of land to produce charcoal and additional labor to sustain both the iron making operations and the community at large. Though iron produced on plantations remained practically useful for Westward Expansion, the eastern United States and Europe increasingly demanded more pliable and resistant steel for use in buildings, ships, engines, and railroads. Though demand still remained for pig iron as an ingredient in steel production, most iron plantations were no longer economically competitive with coke-powered smelters which located themselves increasingly closer to the major cities requiring their products.

== See also ==
- Alliance Furnace
- Catoctin Furnace
- Cornwall Iron Furnace
- Howell Works
- Joanna Furnace Complex
- Pine Grove Iron Works
- Principio Furnace
- Saugus Iron Works National Historic Site
- Sterling Iron Works
